= Sleeping with the Enemy (disambiguation) =

Sleeping with the Enemy is a 1991 film based on the Nancy Price novel.

Sleeping with the Enemy may also refer to:

== Books ==
- Sleeping with the Enemy (novel), a 1987 novel by Nancy Price
- Sleeping with the Enemy: Coco Chanel's Secret War, a 2011 biography of Coco Chanel by Hal Vaughan

== Film and TV ==
- "Sleeping with the Enemy", a 1993 season 4 episode of Northern Exposure
- "Sleeping with the Enemy", a 1995 season 3 episode of Frasier
- "Sleeping with the Enemy", a 2001 season 6 episode of Spin City
- "Sleeping with the Enemy" (The Simpsons), a 2004 episode of The Simpsons

== Music ==
- Sleeping with the Enemy (album), a 1992 album by Paris
- "Sleeping with the Enemy", a song by Mike Got Spiked
- "Sleeping with the Enemy", a song by Kylie Minogue from the album Kiss Me Once
- "Had a Dream (Sleeping with the Enemy)", a song by Roger Hodgson from his album In the Eye of the Storm
- "Sleeping with the Enemy", a song by TV Girl
