= Hans Günther von Dincklage =

Nazi spy (1896–1974)

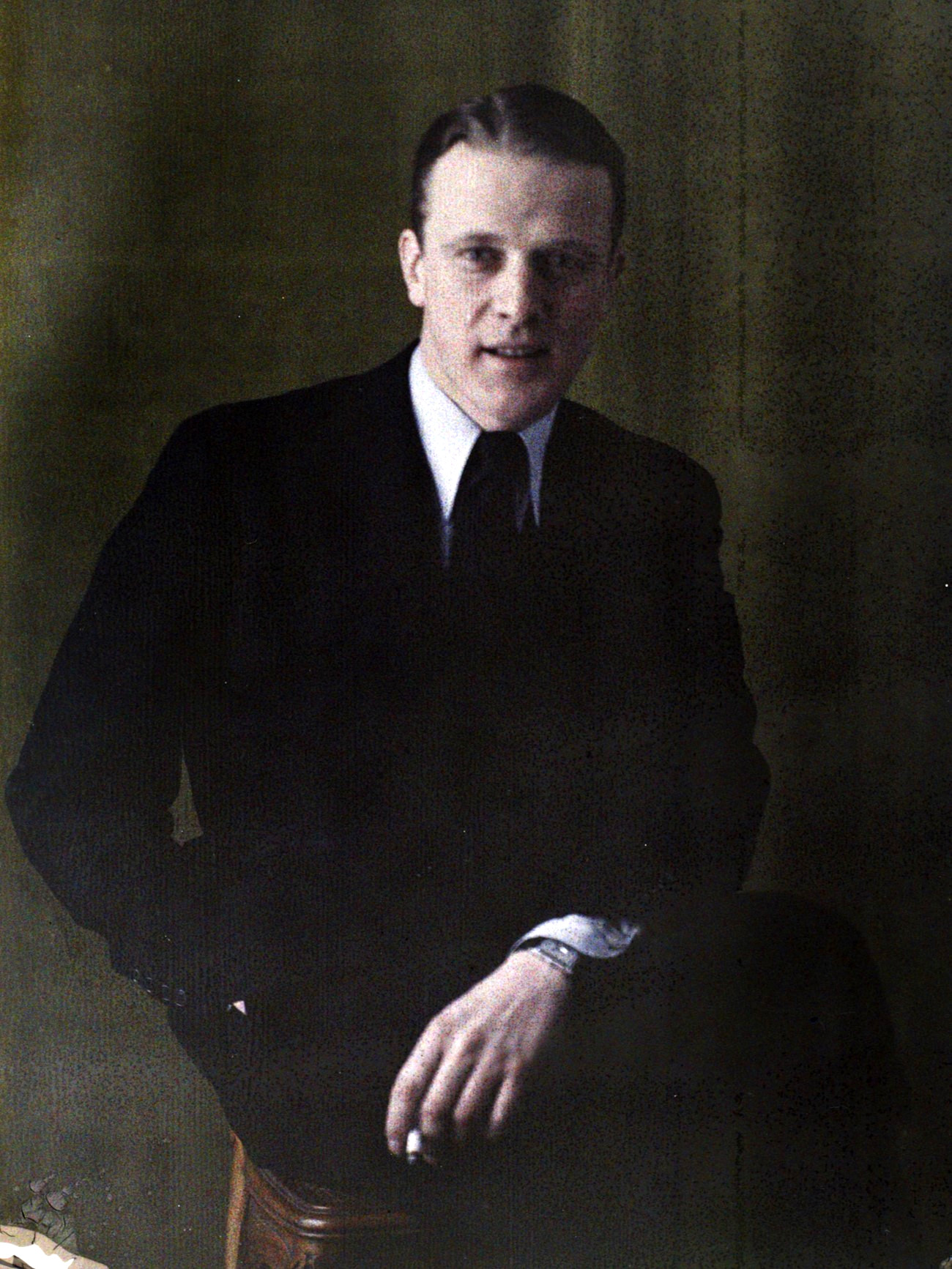
von Dincklage in 1933

Hans Günther von Dincklage (15 December 1896 – 1974) was a German officer and merchant, who was active as a Nazi spy in France before World War II and later during the German occupation of that country.

== Early life ==
Von Dincklage was born in Hannover to a Prussian Major and the daughter of a German merchant. His grandfather was the Prussian General leutnant Georg von Dincklage, who was raised into nobility in 1871. Hans Günther von Dincklage served in World War I in the Prussian Königs-Ulanen-Regiment Nr 13. During the war, Dincklage was promoted to Leutnant and was discharged at an unknown time with the rank of Oberleutnant, possibly due to the dissolution of his regiment in 1919.

On the 12th of May 1927, in Berlin, Dincklage married Maximiliane Henriette Ida von Schoenebeck (19 July 1899 – 12 September 1978), the oldest daughter of Maximilian von Schoenebeck and his first wife, who was of Jewish descent. Maximiliane's half-sister is the author Sybille Bedford. During this time, it is likely that Dincklage was active as a merchant in Berlin. He also began using the title of Baron, even though he had no kinship to the baronial family of Von Dincklage.

== Career ==
Starting 1928, Dincklage supposedly started to work in intelligence for the office Ausland/Abwehr (foreign countries/defense), and later for the SD division Ausland.

Together with Maximiliane's family - her mother, her mother's second husband and her half-sister Sybille - the couple lived in Sanary-sur-Mer from 1928 to 1939. As Maximiliane was considered a half-Jew in Nazi Germany, the family presented themselves as Nazi victims and mingled with the other refugees within that community. "In papers from the French espionage defense it is alleged that Maximiliane entered affairs with naval officers and through this gained information not only about Toulon, but about Bizerte within the French protectorate of Tunisia as well. Her husband pursued his own beneficial affairs; above all he was responsible for forwarding the collected intelligence."

In Spring 1933, he was called to the German embassy in Paris as the "Vertrauensmann des Kanzlers Hitler" (ger. trusted man of the chancellor Hitler) to lead the press and propaganda office. Using targeted financing, he supported the national-socialist and antisemitic French press, such as the newspaper Le Jour, which was founded by Leon Bailby in 1933.

Files of the ministry of foreign affairs document Dincklage's methods. Besides propaganda work he organised financial and logistical support for members of the NSDAP as well as organisations and clubs that supported the party to aid them in establishing themselves in France. He began the recruitment of German engineers in French factories and manipulated university students and professors of Sorbonne, to generate interest in German culture and German studies.

"Even before the Nuremberg Laws (Nürnberger Gesetze) came into effect in 1935, Dincklage filed for divorce from his 'jüdisch versippten' wife Maximiliane. He continued living with her in Sanary continuing their work together."

On Goebbels' orders Dincklage established NS propaganda within French borders and built an intelligence service to control the French opposition. Dincklage encoded his correspondence with the ministry and the Sicherheitsdienst des Reichsführers SS using various methods such as direct phone lines, telegraphs, and cipher machines, such as Enigma. His activity as a spy was known to the French and the refugees on which he was spying, but they decided not to expose him, not wanting to risk an unknown successor. Dincklage's superiors in the Reich security main office were Walter Schellenberg and Alexander Waag.

After being exposed as a spy in 1934, Dincklage accepted a mission in North Africa for which he recruited Baroness Hélène Dessoffy. Dincklage's future missions always included a new female lover from high society, who very likely was funding his endeavours.

== Relationship with Coco Chanel ==
After France's defeat Dincklage returned to Paris. He began a relationship with fashion designer Coco Chanel, living with her until 1944 in the Hôtel Ritz in Paris. In 1943 he introduced Chanel to Theodor Momm, a former army comrade, who supervised French textile production for the Third Reich. On Schellenberg's instruction Momm aimed to use Chanel's contacts to Winston Churchill and Hugh Grosvenor, 2nd duke of Westminster, to create a separate peace with England; the mission titled "Operation Modellhut" failed.

In 1944 Dincklage fled to Lausanne, where Chanel followed him after being released and cleared from her charges in 1945. As the former American secret service officer Hal W. Vaughan reports in his biography, Chanel continued her financial support of both Dincklage and Schellenberg, after the latter was released from prison in 1951, ensuring their silence. In 1952 she covered the cost for Schellenberg's funeral in Turin.

Up until 1954 Chanel lived with Dincklage in Switzerland; in 1951 both were photographed together in Villars sur Ollon, Canton Waadt, Switzerland.

== Death ==
Dincklage later was fascinated by the rise of fascism in Spain under the dictatorship of general Franco. There he settled on Mallorca where he died in 1974.
