= Princess Margaretha, Mrs. Ambler =

Swedish princess (born 1934)

Princess Margaretha
- Mrs. Ambler
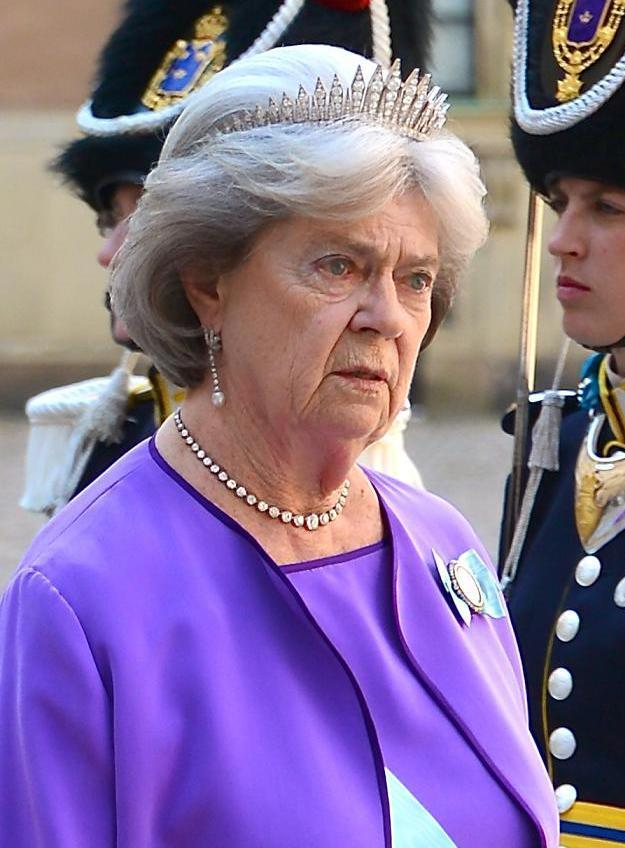
- Margaretha in 2013
- Born: 31 October 1934 (age 92); Haga Palace, Solna, Sweden
- Spouse: John Ambler (m. 1964; died 2008)
- Issue: Sibylla Ambler; Edward Ambler; James Ambler
Names
- Margaretha Désirée Victoria
- House: Bernadotte
- Father: Prince Gustaf Adolf, Duke of Västerbotten
- Mother: Princess Sibylla of Saxe-Coburg and Gotha

Princess Margaretha, Mrs. Ambler (Margaretha Désirée Victoria; born 31 October 1934) is a member of the Swedish royal family. She is the eldest child of Prince Gustaf Adolf, Duke of Västerbotten, and Princess Sibylla of Saxe-Coburg and Gotha, and the eldest sister of King Carl XVI Gustaf.

Margaretha is the oldest-living member of the Swedish royal family.

== Early life ==
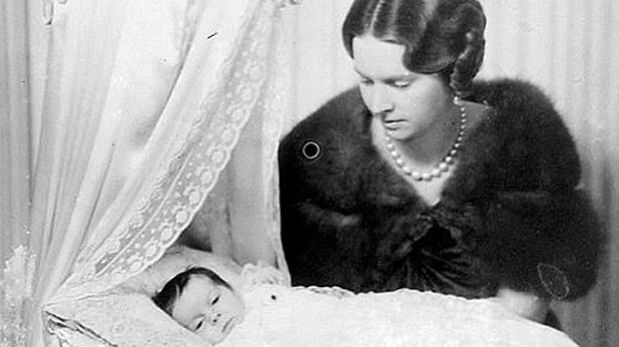
The newborn Princess Margaretha with her mother, Princess Sibylla

Margaretha was born on 31 October 1934 at Haga Palace in Haga Park, Stockholm, as the first child of Prince Gustaf Adolf, Duke of Västerbotten, and his wife Princess Sibylla of Saxe-Coburg-Gotha; paternal granddaughter of Crown Prince Gustaf Adolf of Sweden and his late wife Princess Margaret of Connaught; maternal granddaughter of Duke Carl Eduard I, Duke of Saxe-Coburg and Gotha and his wife Princess Victoria Adelaide of Schleswig-Holstein; she was born during the reign of her paternal great-grandfather King Gustaf V of Sweden. In January 1947, her father died in an airplane crash.

Although the eldest child, as a female, she was never in line to the throne according to the Swedish constitution current at the time. She was educated privately at the Haga Palace and then at the Stockholm dressmaking school, Märthaskolan (Martha School). Margaretha studied ceramics and textiles at Nyckelvik School. She is also trained as an occupational therapist at Karolinska Hospital.

== Courtship and marriage ==
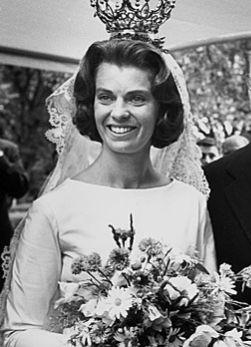
Margaretha at her wedding in 1964

She took part in the ship tour organized by Queen Frederica and her husband King Paul of Greece in 1954, which became known as the “Cruise of the Kings” and was attended by over 100 royals from all over Europe.

Around 1957 Margaretha had a relationship with Robin Douglas-Home, a Scottish aristocrat and the nephew of the future Prime Minister of the United Kingdom Alec Douglas-Home. He came to visit her in Sweden, but they never married. There was speculation in the press that this was due to Sibylla forbidding the match, but Margaretha's nanny and confidante Ingrid Björnberg states categorically in her memoirs that the breakup between the two was caused by Margaretha's reluctance to enter into an engagement with Douglas-Home.

She met her future husband, the businessman John Ambler, ten years her elder, at a dinner party in the United Kingdom in 1963 and their engagement was announced on 28 February 1964. They were married on 30 June 1964, in Gärdslösa Church, on the island of Öland. The Princess wore a wedding gown from the Stockholm couture school, Märthaskolan, where she had previously been a student, and a traditional wedding crown from Öland.

The couple for a time let Winslow Hall in Buckinghamshire. They settled at Chippinghurst Manor in Oxfordshire. As a result of her unequal marriage, she lost her style of Royal Highness and the King gave her the courtesy title of Princess Margaretha, Mrs. Ambler. Under the Swedish constitution of that time, she, as a woman, and her descendants were not eligible to inherit the throne. Thus they still are not.

Ambler and her husband separated in 1994, but never divorced. He died on 31 May 2008.

The couple had three children:

- Sibylla Louise Ambler (born 14 April 1965 in London), married Freiherr Henning Cornelius von Dincklage (born 29 April 1971 in Esslingen am Neckar) in 1998. The couple had two children before separating in 2005:
  - Freiin Madeleine Charlotte Margaretha von Dincklage (born 15 March 1999 in Munich), a goddaughter of Crown Princess Victoria of Sweden and bridesmaid at her wedding in 2010
  - Freiherr Sebastian Eric Henning von Dincklage (born 8 September 2000 in Munich)
- Charles Edward Ambler (born 14 July 1966 in London), married Helen Jane Ross (born 3 March 1969 in Huddersfield) in 1999 and has two daughters:
  - Sienna Rose Ambler (born 1 September 2000)
  - India Tani Ambler (born 13 November 2003)
- James Patrick Ambler (born 10 June 1969 in Oxford), who served as page boy at the 1976 wedding of his uncle, King Carl XVI Gustaf. He married Ursula Mary Shipley (born 9 July 1965 in St Austell) in 2001 and has two children:
  - Lily Elektra Ambler (born 28 February 2003)
  - Oscar Rufus Ambler (born 10 September 2004)

== Later life ==
In the late 1950s and early 1960s, Margaretha undertook periods of study and practical work. In 1956, she spent time in London, where she worked as a children's activity leader at Middlesex Hospital, and in 1959 she became patron of the children's charity Mitt sommarbarn. She later studied ceramics and textiles at Nyckelviksskolan before training as an occupational therapist at Karolinska Hospital. In June 1960, Margaretha, with her first cousin Princess Margrethe of Denmark and her second cousin once removed Princess Astrid of Norway, toured the United States on the occasion of the first transatlantic flight by Scandinavian Airlines. During their visit, the three Scandinavian princesses toured Disneyland and Hollywood and also visited Paramount Pictures in Los Angeles where they met Dean Martin, Jerry Lewis, and Elvis Presley.

Following her marriage to a non-royal, Margaretha ceased to hold her former status as a Swedish royal princess, although she retained the style Princess Margaretha as an honorific. The family initially lived in London before moving to Chippinghurst Manor in Oxfordshire. From the 1970s onwards, Margaretha's principal representative role was the annual opening of the Church of Sweden's Christmas bazaar in London, a role she continued until 2007. In 1994, the Amblers left Chippinghurst Manor following financial difficulties, after which Margaretha lived at Tulip Cottage near Chipping Norton. The couple separated in 1996 but remained married until John's death in 2008.

Although she lived increasingly privately in England, Margaretha continued to attend selected family occasions in Sweden. She attended the wedding of Crown Princess Victoria and Daniel Westling in 2010, the wedding of Princess Madeleine and Christopher O'Neill in 2013, and the wedding of Prince Carl Philip and Sofia Hellqvist in 2015. She also attended the christening of Prince Nicolas in 2015 and the christening of Princess Adrienne in 2018. She also attended other family occasions, including the 50th birthday celebrations of King Carl XVI Gustaf, his Ruby Jubilee commemorative service, and family funerals.

In December 2024, Margaretha returned to Stockholm for the funeral of her sister, Princess Birgitta, and in February 2026 she returned again to attend the funeral of her sister Princess Désirée. Apart from attending family events and milestones, she has no official role or obligations on behalf of Sweden or the Swedish royal family.

== Ancestry ==
Ancestors of Princess Margaretha, Mrs. Ambler

8. Gustaf V of Sweden
4. Gustaf VI Adolf of Sweden
9. Princess Victoria of Baden
2. Prince Gustaf Adolf, Duke of Västerbotten
10. Prince Arthur, Duke of Connaught and Strathearn
5. Princess Margaret of Connaught
11. Princess Louise Margaret of Prussia
1. Princess Margaretha of Sweden
12. Prince Leopold, Duke of Albany
6. Charles Edward, Duke of Saxe-Coburg and Gotha
13. Princess Helena of Waldeck and Pyrmont
3. Princess Sibylla of Saxe-Coburg and Gotha
14. Friedrich Ferdinand, Duke of Schleswig-Holstein
7. Princess Victoria Adelaide of Schleswig-Holstein-Sonderburg-Glücksburg
15. Princess Karoline Mathilde of Schleswig-Holstein-Sonderburg-Augustenburg
