= Dinklage (surname) =

Dinklage is a surname. Notable people with the surname include:

- August Dinklage (1849–1920), German architect
- Peter Dinklage (born 1969), American actor

== See also ==
- Dincklage
