= Cuddesdon =

Village in South Oxfordshire, England

Coordinates: 51.723°N 1.133°W

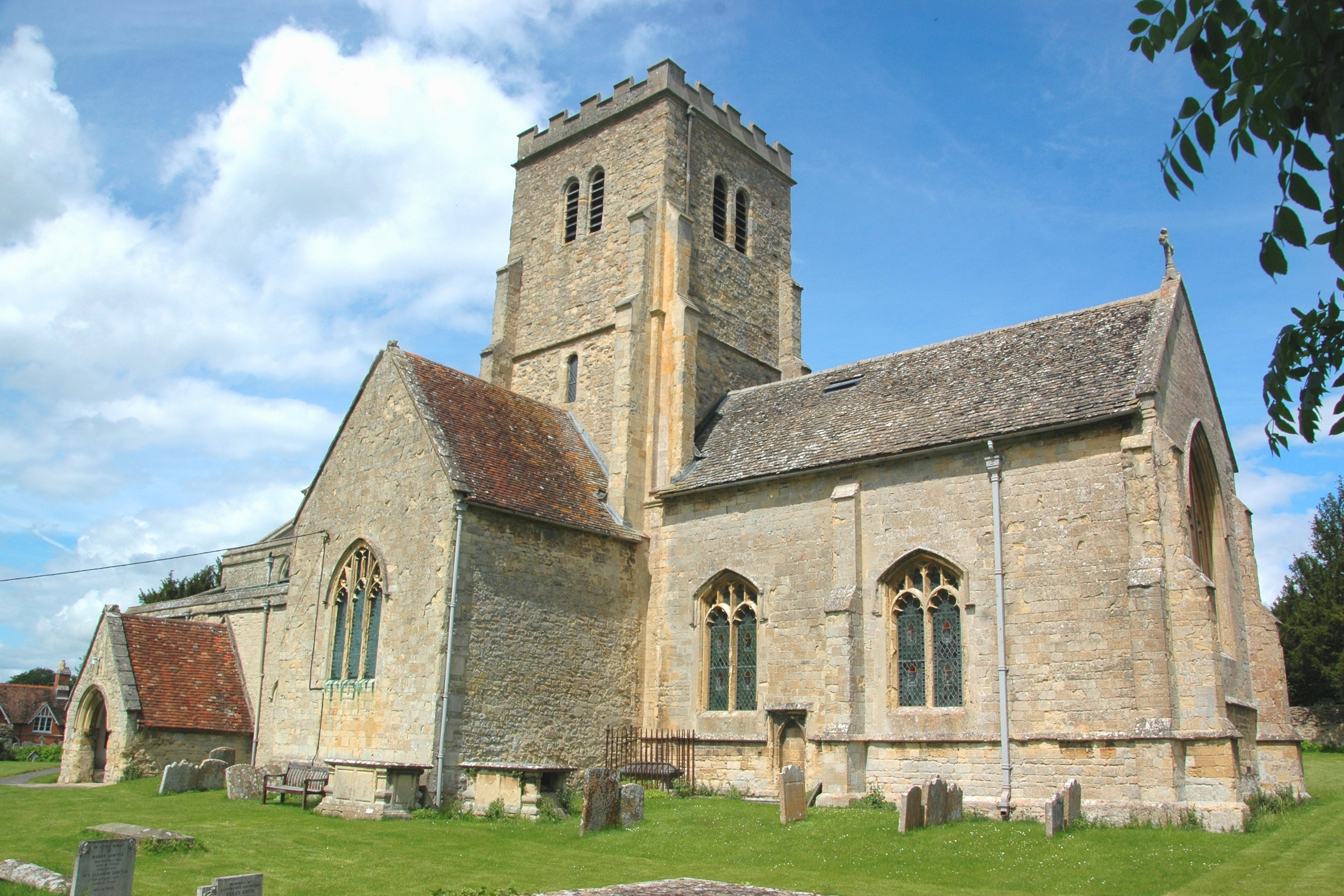
- All Saints' parish church

- Location within Oxfordshire
- Population: 502 (parish, including Denton) (2001 census)
- OS grid reference: SP6003
- Civil parish: Cuddesdon and Denton
- District: South Oxfordshire
- Shire county: Oxfordshire
- Region: South East
- Country: England
- Sovereign state: United Kingdom
- Post town: Oxford
- Postcode district: OX44
- Dialling code: 01865
- Police: Thames Valley
- Fire: Oxfordshire
- Ambulance: South Central
- UK Parliament: Henley
- Website: Cuddesdon and Denton Community Website

Cuddesdon is a village in the civil parish of Cuddesdon and Denton, in the South Oxfordshire district of Oxfordshire, England. The village lies 5.5 miles (9 km) ESE of Oxford. Ripon College Cuddesdon is a large Church of England clergy training centre in the village.

== History ==
Cuddesdon's toponym is derived from the Old English Cuddes Dune meaning "Cudde's Hill" or the "Hill of Cuthwine". Cuddesdon was an Anglo-Saxon linear village along in what is now the High Street, but since the 19th-century Church of England additions on the northern edge of the village and 20th-century residential developments (principally Bishop's Wood and Parkside), it has become a nuclear settlement centred on The Green. Since the 1950s many facilities and businesses in Cuddesdon, have closed, and most have been converted into housing. These include the petrol station, the shop, the school, the mill, the second public house and various farm buildings. Thus, the village has turned into a dormitory village.

Cuddesdon was an ancient parish in the Bullingdon Hundred of Oxfordshire. The parish was subdivided into four townships: Chippinghurst, Denton, Wheatley, and a Cuddesdon township covering the central part of the parish around the village itself. Parish functions under the poor laws from the 17th century onwards were exercised by each township separately rather than for the parish as a whole. As such, each township became a separate civil parish in 1866 when the legal definition of 'parish' was changed to be the areas used for administering the poor laws. Chippinghurst was absorbed into Denton parish in 1932. In 1962, Cuddesdon and Denton were merged into a new civil parish called Cuddesdon and Denton, which therefore reunited three of the four historic townships of the old Cuddesdon parish. At the 1961 census (the last before Cuddesdon merged with Denton), Cuddesdon parish had a population of 342.

== Site ==
The parish is bounded by the River Thame to the east and southeast, its tributary Cuddesdon Brook to the north, by the road between Wheatley and Garsington to the west and by field boundaries to the southwest. The village is on a hill that overlooks south Oxfordshire, northern Berkshire, the Aylesbury Vale in central Buckinghamshire and a small part of west Bedfordshire. There are views of both the Chiltern Hills and the North Wessex Downs AONB stretching from Ivinghoe Beacon in the east to Didcot Power Station in the west.

== The village today ==
=== Culture and events ===
A free monthly parish newsletter is combined with social venues and events in the village, such as the annual Guy Fawkes Night fireworks, a summer fête and various groups that meet regularly such as the film club. Most social activities are organised or coordinated by the Parish Council or its subsidiaries. The Church of England parish church of All Saints, the Bat and Ball inn, the Village Hall, Ripon College Cuddesdon and the farms are economically active.

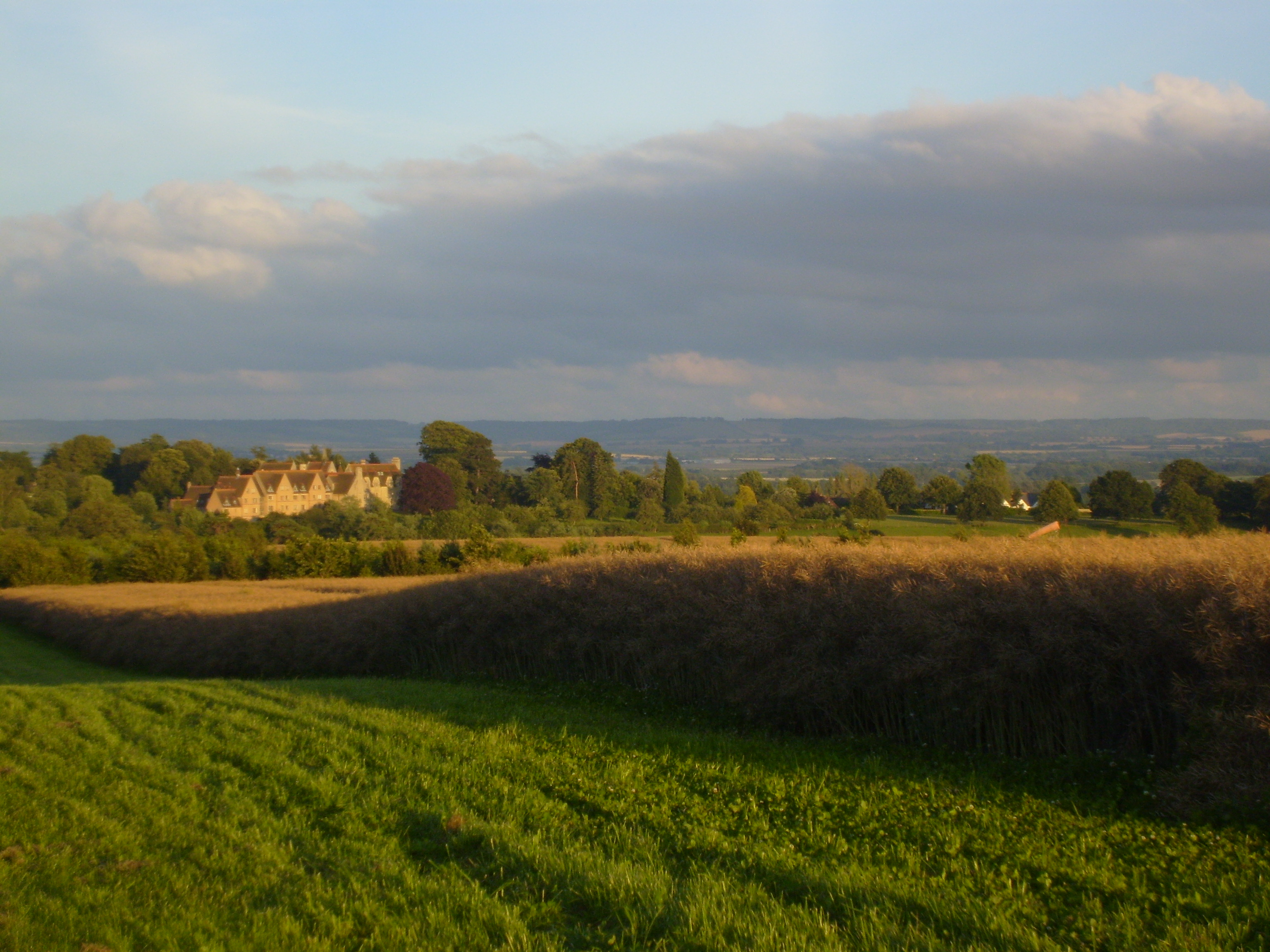
Ripon College Cuddesdon from the north-west, with the Chiltern escarpment visible beyond

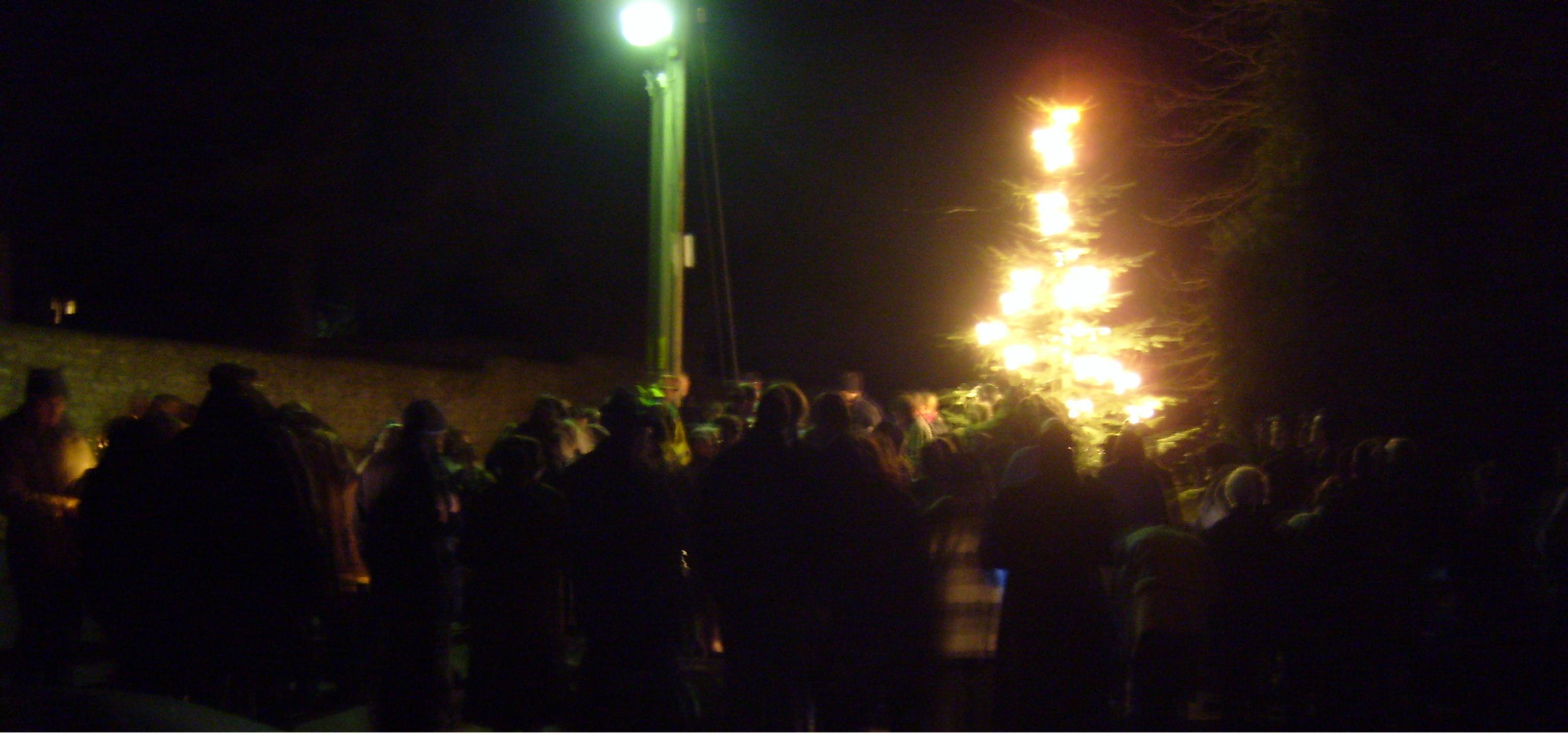
Cuddesdon villagers and students Christmas Carolling on the village green 16 December 2007

=== Public policy ===
In November 2007 a public consultation was held on the proposed Parish Plan, a strategic document aiming to chart the hopes of the village for twenty years to come. Formal encouragement exists in civil parish and district planning policy to reopen a village shop, as yet unforthcoming.

== Ecclesiastical presence ==
=== Parish church ===
Abingdon Abbey founded the Church of England parish church of All Saints in Cuddesdon in about 1180. All Saints' parish belongs to the Aston and Cuddesdon Deanery of the Diocese of Oxford.

=== Bishop's palace ===
Cuddesdon Palace was completed by 1634 for John Bancroft, who was Bishop of Oxford from 1632 until 1641. In 1644 during the English Civil War Royalist forces burned the palace to render it unusable by the Parliamentarian forces besieging Oxford. In 1676 John Fell was made Bishop of Oxford and in 1679 he commissioned the complete rebuilding of the palace. In 1846 Bishop Samuel Wilberforce had the chapel of Saints Peter and Paul added to the Palace. It was designed by the Gothic Revival architect Benjamin Ferrey. Successive Bishops of Oxford resided at the palace until Thomas Banks Strong retired in 1937. For the duration of the Second World War Queen Anne's Bounty was evacuated from London and occupied the palace. Thereafter, The Society of the Salutation of Mary the Virgin occupied the palace from 1946 until 1949. In the 1960s the palace was in private use for a few years, but it burnt down before the end of that decade. The bishop's chapel escaped the fire and survives today.

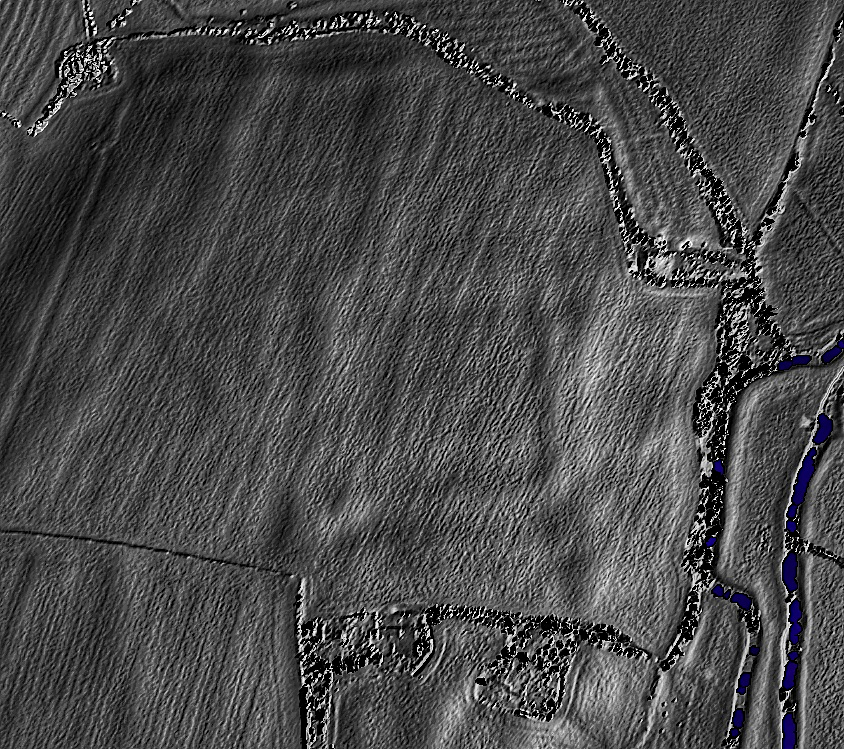
A lidar view of a substantial archaeological feature to the immediate north-east of Cuddesdon only recently added to the historical record.

=== Theological college ===
In 1854 Bishop Wilberforce founded Cuddesdon College on land opposite the Palace to train men to become Anglican clergy. In 1975 the college merged with Ripon Hall to form Ripon College Cuddesdon. Due to the extent of past and present church connections, the village is also known as the "Holy Hill". It has been suggested that in Cuddesdon "the presence of the Church has been more strongly felt than perhaps anywhere else in England".

=== Hymn Tune ===
'Cuddesdon' is the name of a tune by William H Ferguson (1874-1950) given to the hymn 'Glory in the highest to the God of heaven!' by Christopher Idle (b 1938)

== Territorial designation ==
After his retirement in 1991, Robert Runcie, former archbishop of Canterbury, a former vicar of Cuddesdon and college principal, was granted a peerage as Baron Runcie of Cuddesdon to remain in the House of Lords.

== Notable people ==
- Eliza Brown, who was an early settler in the Swan River Colony (colonial Western Australia) whose letters to her father, William Bussey, of Cuddesdon, record the hardships of her family and constitute a valuable addition to early accounts of the colony, describing it in its second decade of existence. She also accompanied an exploration to Champion Bay in 1851, her account of the journey being published.
- Sir Edward Loughlin O'Malley, former Attorney General of Hong Kong, Chief Justice of the Straits Settlements and Chief Judge of the British Supreme Consular Court at Constantinople, purchased property in what had been Denton in 1892. He died at his residence, Denton House, and was buried in Cuddesdon in 1932.

== See also ==
- Chippinghurst Manor

== Sources ==
- Chapman, Mark (2004). God's Holy Hill: A History of Christianity in Cuddesdon. Chipping Norton: The Wychwood Press. ISBN 1-902279-20-4.
- Lobel, Mary D, ed. (1957). A History of the County of Oxford. Victoria County History. Vol. 5: Bullingdon Hundred. pp. 96–116.
- Sherwood, Jennifer; Pevsner, Nikolaus (1974). Oxfordshire. The Buildings of England. Harmondsworth: Penguin Books. pp. 562–565. ISBN 0-14-071045-0.
