= Cuddesdon and Denton =

Coordinates: 51°43′00″N 01°07′30″W

- Civil parish
- Location within Oxfordshire
- Civil parish: Cuddesdon and Denton
- District: South Oxfordshire
- Shire county: Oxfordshire
- Region: South East
- Country: England
- Sovereign state: United Kingdom
- Post town: Oxford
- Postcode district: OX44
- Dialling code: 01865
- Police: Thames Valley
- Fire: Oxfordshire
- Ambulance: South Central
- UK Parliament: Henley and Thame
- Website: Cuddesdon and Denton community website

Cuddesdon and Denton is a civil parish in the county of Oxfordshire, England. Forming part of South Oxfordshire district its main settlements are Cuddesdon and Denton.
