= List of longest-living members of the Swedish royal family =

This is a list of the longest-living members of the Swedish royal family, including those who held Swedish royal titles by birth, grant, or marriage. The list ranks individuals by verified lifespan, from longest to shortest.

Among those listed, Countess Marianne Bernadotte is the longest-lived member of the extended Swedish royal family, having lived to the age of 100 years and 305 days.

Among living members, the longest-lived female is Princess Margaretha, Mrs. Ambler, the eldest sister of King Carl XVI Gustaf, and the longest-lived male member of the Swedish royal family is Carl XVI Gustaf, King of Sweden since 1973.

This list includes members of the House of Bernadotte and its related branches, reflecting the dynastic connections between the Swedish royal family and other European royal houses.

== List ==
All persons are listed below by their Swedish royal titles by birth, grant, or by marriage. However, some of these individuals are better known by other titles.

Rank	Name (Note: As this is a list of Swedish royal family members, individuals are listed by their Swedish royal title by birth, grant, or by marriage.)	Portrait	Relation (Note: Those deriving their Swedish titles by birth are shown by relation "to" the parent from whose title theirs derived; those deriving their titles by marriage are shown by relation "to" the spouse to whom their marriage from whom the title automatically (for wives) or by grant derived)		Lifespan (Note: To maintain consistency within the table, the dates of birth and death are given in the New Style.)		Duration	
Rank	Name	Portrait	By	To	From	To	(days)	(years, days)
1	Countess Marianne of Wisborg		Marriage	Count Sigvard of Wisborg	15 July 1924	16 May 2025	36,830	100 years, 305 days
2	Princess Lilian, Duchess of Halland		Marriage	Prince Bertil, Duke of Halland	30 August 1915	10 March 2013	35,622	97 years, 192 days
3	Count Lennart Bernadotte		Blood	Prince Wilhelm, Duke of Södermanland	8 May 1909	21 December 2004	34,926	95 years, 227 days
4	Carl Johan Bernadotte		Blood	Gustaf VI Adolf	31 October 1916	5 May 2012	34,885	95 years, 187 days
5	Count Sigvard Bernadotte		Blood	Gustaf VI Adolf	7 June 1907	4 February 2002	34,576	94 years, 242 days
6	Prince Oscar, Duke of Gotland		Blood	Oscar II	15 November 1859	4 October 1953	34,291	93 years, 323 days
7	Gunnila Bernadotte		Marriage	Carl Johan Bernadotte	12 May 1923	12 September 2016	34,092	93 years, 123 days
8	Prince Carl Bernadotte		Blood	Prince Carl, Duke of Västergötland	10 January 1911	27 June 2003	33,771	92 years, 168 days
9	Gustaf V		Blood	Oscar II	16 June 1858	29 October 1950	33,737	92 years, 135 days
10	Princess Margaretha, Mrs. Ambler		Blood	Prince Gustaf Adolf, Duke of Västerbotten	31 October 1934	Living	33,611	92 years, 8 days
11	Gustaf VI Adolf		Blood	Gustaf V	11 November 1882	15 September 1973	33,180	90 years, 308 days
12	Prince Carl, Duke of Västergötland		Blood	Oscar II	27 February 1861	24 October 1951	33,110	90 years, 239 days
13	Queen Ingrid of Denmark		Blood	Gustaf VI Adolf	28 March 1910	7 November 2000	33,097	90 years, 224 days
