= John Ambler =

British businessman (1924–2008)

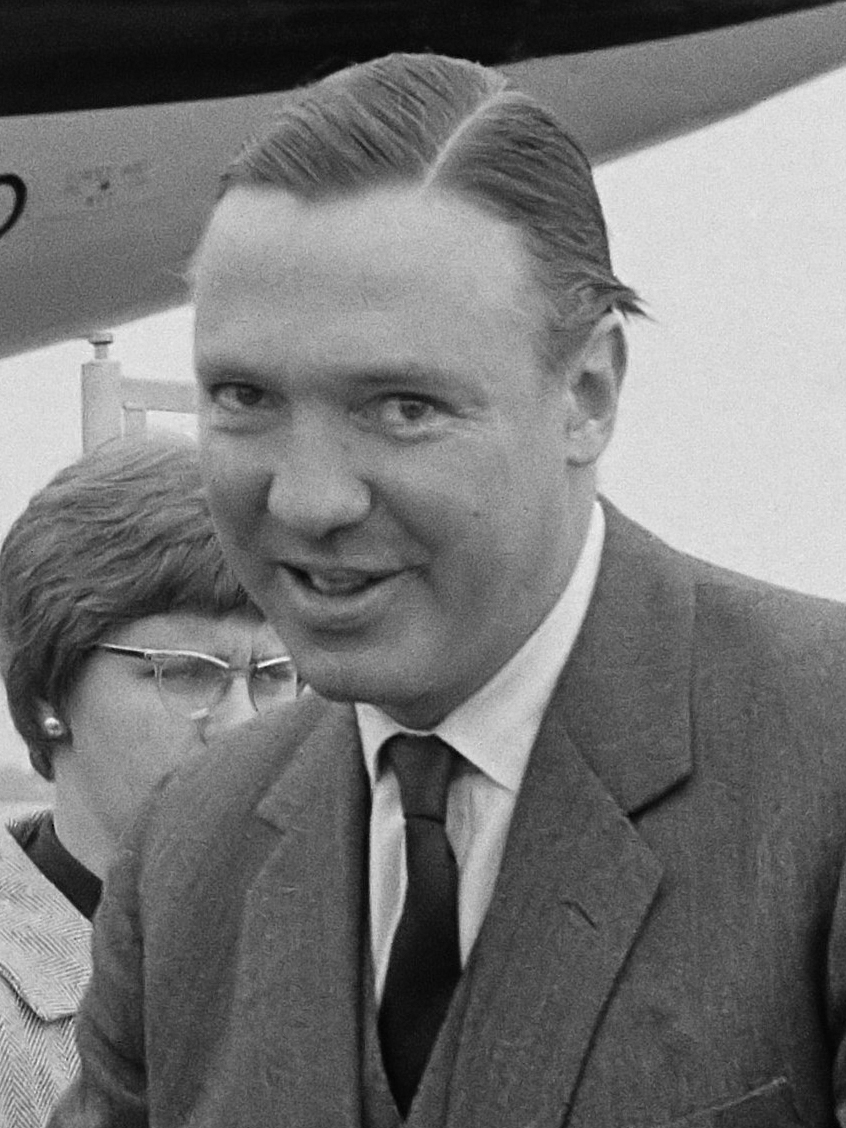
- Ambler in 1964
- Born: John Kenneth Ambler; 6 June 1924; Dorking, Surrey, United Kingdom
- Died: 31 May 2008 (aged 83); Banbury, United Kingdom
- Occupation: Businessman
- Spouse: Princess Margaretha of Sweden (m. 1964)
- Children: 3

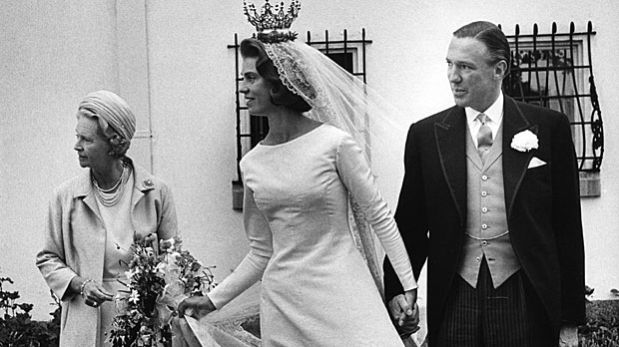
Princess Margaretha and John Ambler with her mother, Princess Sibylla, outside Solliden Palace after the wedding in 1964

John Kenneth Ambler (6 June 1924 – 31 May 2008) was a British businessman married to Princess Margaretha of Sweden.

== Life and work ==
Ambler was born in Dorking, Surrey. His parents were Captain Charles Ambler (1896–1954) and Louise Gwendolen Cullen (1895–1980). In October 1942, he was commissioned in the Queen's Royal Regiment (West Surrey).

Princess Margaretha and John Ambler were married in Gärdslösa Church, Öland, on 30 June 1964. The couple then lived in England, first in London and later at Chippinghurst Manor outside Oxford. They had three children: Sybilla Louise (b. London, 14 April 1965), Charles Edward (b. London, 14 July 1966) and James Patrick (b. Oxford, 10 June 1967).

For many years John Ambler was a director of Atlas Express Ltd (which provided nationwide parcel delivery services) and managing director of Atlas Air Express. In the late 1950s he used Freddie Laker's Channel Air Bridge car ferry flights, from Southend to Rotterdam and Ostend. Working with continental hauliers Ambler later established Trukair, a parcel delivery network connecting the UK and the Common Market and Scandinavia; this was a pioneering venture, before the inception of daily roll-on, roll-off ferry services between the UK and the Continent. After business declined, the family had to vacate their home, Chippinghurst Manor (which was owned by James Gladstone McDougall, a member of a flour milling dynasty), and move to a smaller house.

The Amblers often visited the Swedish royal family at Solliden Palace in Öland and John Ambler often participated in King Carl XVI Gustaf's autumn hunts.

The couple separated in 1996, but continued to be married. Ambler suffered from poor health for a number of years and spent his last ten years in a nursing home in Oxfordshire.

== Honours ==
- Sweden : Commander of the Royal Order of Vasa (1964). --

=== Foreign honours ===
- Netherlands: Recipient of the Wedding Medal of Princess Beatrix and Claus Van Amsberg.

== See also ==
- Swedish royal family
