= Gärdslösa Church =

- Gärdslösa kyrka
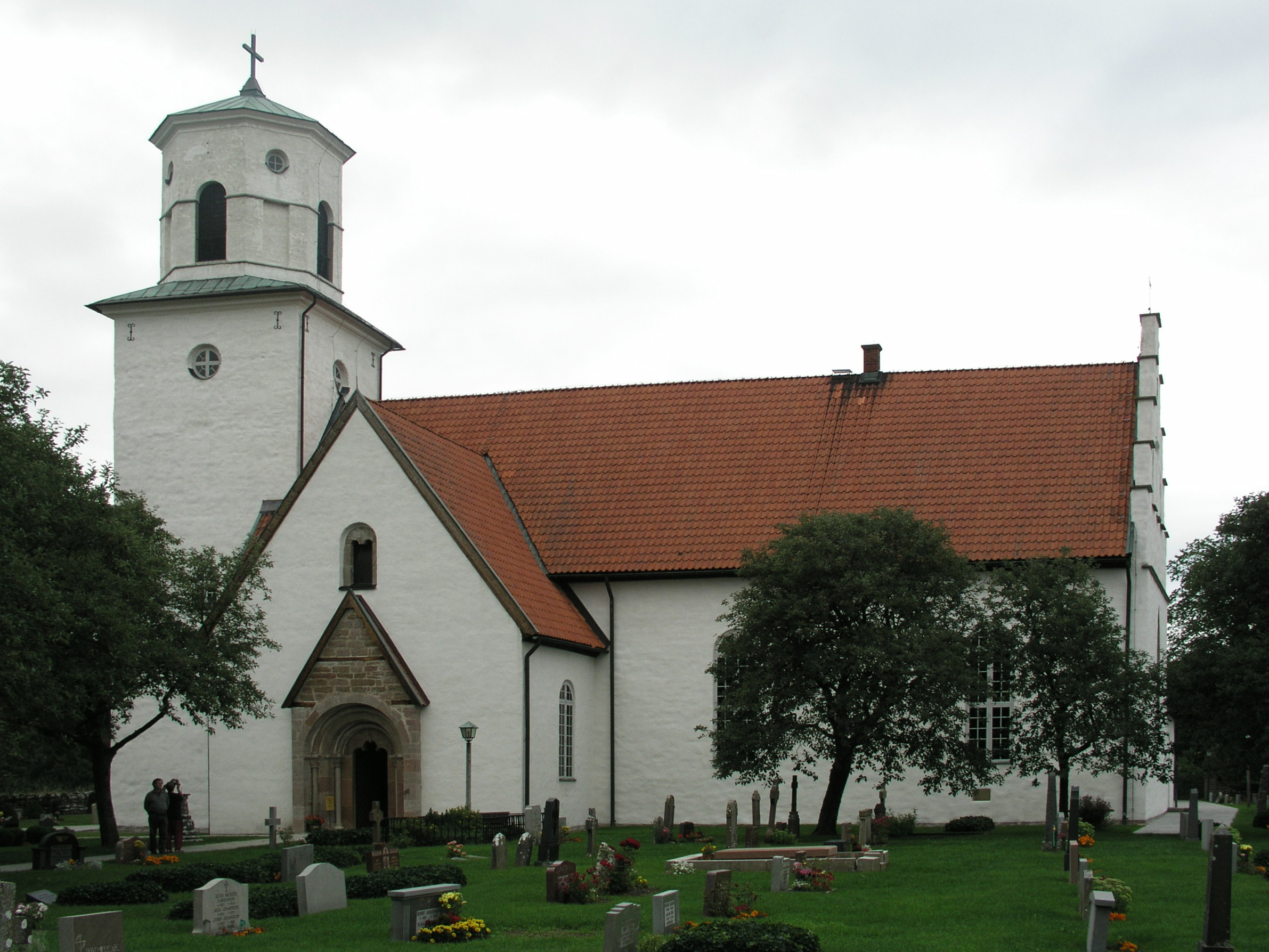
- Gärdslösa Church, view of the exterior

- Location within Kalmar
- 56°47′36″N 16°44′16″E
- Country: Sweden
- Denomination: Church of Sweden

Administration
- Diocese: Växjö

Gärdslösa Church (Swedish: Gärdslösa kyrka) is a Lutheran church on the Swedish island Öland, in the Baltic Sea. It belongs to the Diocese of Växjö.

== History and architecture ==
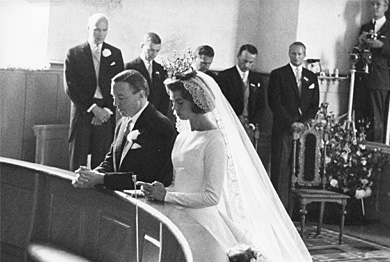
Wedding of Margaretha, Princess of Sweden and John Ambler in 1964

In the church porch of Gärdslösa Church stands a Christian runestone, indicating that there could have been a wooden church on the same spot as early as the 11th century. The presently visible church however dates from the 12th century; according to tradition it was inaugurated in 1138. The oldest parts of the church are the westernmost part of the nave. Only slightly later is the foundation of the tower. The church was successively rebuilt and expanded during the Middle Ages. Thus the vaulting of the church dates from circa 1240, and the choir was rebuilt in stages during the late 13th century by a master stonemason from Gotland by the name Ronensis. Its crow-stepped gable is unique for its kind on Öland. The interior has also been decorated with frescos from several periods. One cycle dates from the 13th century, and others are from 1498, the late 16th century and 1642, respectively. Gärdslösa Church is the best preserved medieval church on Öland. Apart from the church spire and the windows, which were enlarged in 1845, the church still in principle retains its medieval appearance. The church was renovated in 1957–58.

Today the church consists of a nave and transept, a choir of almost equal width as the nave and a church tower in the west. The walls of the exterior are whitewashed (except for a small area). Inside, the church is characterised by the many frescos. The altarpiece was made in 1764–66 and seeks to imitate the altarpiece of Kalmar Cathedral. Most of the furnishings of the church also date from the 17th and 18th centuries. The oldest item in the church is a small triumphal cross from the early 14th century.

The father of the Swedish poet Erik Johan Stagnelius was a priest at the church for some years, and the poet spent his childhood in the nearby parsonage. In 1924, a memorial stone was erected near the church in commemoration of the poet, with a portrait medallion executed by Arvid Källström. The church was also the venue for the marriage between Princess Margaretha of Sweden and John Ambler, an English businessman, in 1964.
