= R. Fielding Dodd =

Scottish architect

R. Fielding Dodd ARIBA
- Born: c.1890 Scotland
- Died: 1958
- Occupation: Architect
- Practice: R. Fielding Dodd & Stevens
- Projects: St Peter's College, Oxford (1930) St Edmund Hall, Oxford (1934) Art School, Stowe School (1935) Chippinghurst Manor (1937)

Ronald Fielding Dodd ARIBA (c.1890 – 1958) was a Scottish architect, later based in England. He was an Associate of the Royal Institute of British Architects.

R. Fielding Dodd served as a Second Lieutenant in the British Army's Machine Gun Corps during World War I.

Dodd was most active as an architect in the 1930s. In 1930, Dodd used a Wren revival style with an accentuated roofline at St Peter's College, Oxford. The Hannington Quad at the college was formed by the construction of an accommodation block designed by Dodd with the help of Sir Herbert Baker behind the older buildings in a red-brick neo-Georgian style. In 1934, he completed the south side of the quadrangle at St Edmund Hall, Oxford, marking the 700th anniversary of St Edmund's consecration as the Archbishop of Canterbury. In 1935, he designed the Art School at Stowe School. In 1937, he added a neo-Georgian frontage to the Acland Hospital in North Oxford. Also in 1937, he worked on extending the 16-century Chippinghurst Manor, a neo-vernacular country house near Little Milton, Oxfordshire.

Dodd co-founded the architectural firm R. Fielding Dodd & Stevens. Later, the firm became Stevens, Flavel & Beard. The firm was based in Turl Street, Oxford.

There is now a Fielding Dodd Prize for "Outstanding Work" involving architecture at Oxford Brookes University.
