= Denton, Oxfordshire =

Hamlet in Oxfordshire, England

Coordinates: 51.718°N 1.141°W

Denton
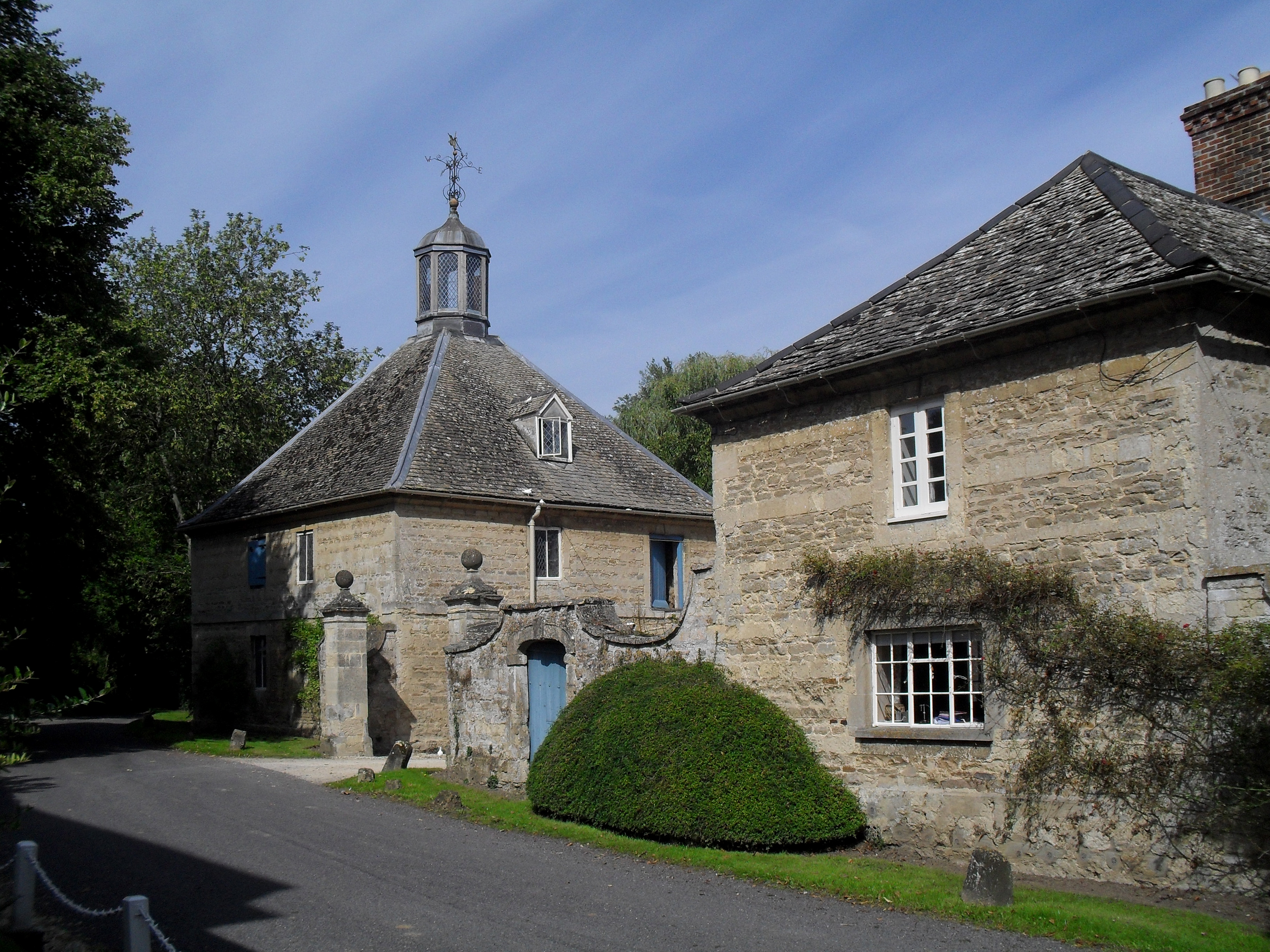
- Stables at Denton House

- Location within Oxfordshire
- OS grid reference: SP5902
- Civil parish: Cuddesdon and Denton
- District: South Oxfordshire
- Shire county: Oxfordshire
- Region: South East
- Country: England
- Sovereign state: United Kingdom
- Post town: Oxford
- Postcode district: OX44
- Dialling code: 01865
- Police: Thames Valley
- Fire: Oxfordshire
- Ambulance: South Central
- UK Parliament: Henley
- Website: Cuddesdon and Denton Community Website

Denton is a hamlet in the civil parish of Cuddesdon and Denton, in the South Oxfordshire district of Oxfordshire, England.

Denton's toponym is derived from the Old English den-tun meaning "valley farmstead". Denton is in a fold of the landscape, between the two hills on which Cuddesdon and Garsington stand. Denton was anciently a manor, which was owned by Abingdon Abbey from 956 until the abbey's dissolution in 1538, after which the ownership fragmented.

Denton was historically one of the four hamlets or townships into which the ancient parish of Cuddesdon was subdivided. Parish functions under the poor laws from the 17th century onwards were exercised by each township separately rather than for the parish as a whole. As such, Denton became a separate civil parish in 1866 when the legal definition of 'parish' was changed to be the areas used for administering the poor laws. The civil parish of Chippinghurst, one of the other former hamlets of Cuddesdon, was absorbed into Denton parish in 1932. In 1962, Denton was merged with Cuddesdon into a new civil parish called Cuddesdon and Denton, which therefore reunited three of the four historic townships of the old Cuddesdon parish. At the 1961 census (the last before the abolition of the parish), Denton had a population of 112.

== See also ==
- Chippinghurst Manor
