= Sleeping with the Enemy: Coco Chanel's Secret War =

2011 book by Hal Vaughan

- Author: Hal Vaughan
- Language: English
- Publisher: Knopf Doubleday Publishing Group
- Publication date: 2011
- Publication place: United States
- Pages: 336
- ISBN: 978-0-3074-7591-6

Sleeping with the Enemy: Coco Chanel's Secret War is a 2011 book by journalist Hal Vaughan, it was published by Knopf Doubleday Publishing Group, now part of Penguin Random House. The book is a biography of French fashion designer Coco Chanel, detailing her life from humble beginnings growing up in relative poverty, to her meteoric rise in French and British society and emergence as a fashion icon.

The book also details her active collaboration with the Nazi intelligence service, the Sicherheitsdienst, during the second World War. Although it had been known that Chanel was a mistress of a Nazi officer, the extent of her Nazi collaboration during the war had previously been unknown prior to the publication of the book.

== Narrative ==
The biography details Chanel's life, beginning in her early childhood. She was born into poverty as Gabrielle Chanel in 1883, in the Loire Valley of France. Chanel lived in a home for the poor until the age of 12, where, upon her mother's death, she moved to a Catholic orphanage. At the age of 18, Chanel took the name "Coco" and worked as a cabaret singer and seamstress. The book proceeds to detail her rise among the French and British upper class, first by forming a relationship with French socialite and former cavalry officer Etienne Balsan and then her relationship with the English polo player Arthur Edward Capel, who financed her first fashion boutiques in Paris.

Chanel continued her rise in British society by befriending Winston Churchill and becoming the mistress of Hugh Grosvenor, 2nd Duke of Westminster. After the start of the Second World War, Chanel engaged in a romantic relationship with Nazi intelligence officer Hans Gunther von Dincklage (known as "Spatz"). During the war, Chanel became an active collaborator for Nazi Germany, being active as a German spy. In 1943, Chanel was an instrumental part of Operation Modelhut (Model Hat), in which Nazi intelligence officers attempted to get a message to Churchill through Chanel which stated that some senior SS officers, operating independently of Adolf Hitler and the rest of Germany's government, wished to broker a ceasefire with Britain.

After the war, Chanel was able to keep her Nazi past hidden from French society and the wider world. She paid off General Walter Schellenberg, who was her commander during Operation Modelhut, to keep her out of his memoirs. After the war, Chanel was able to cunningly re-integrate into French society and continued her rise as a style icon. The book also documents Chanel's fervent antisemitism, including her attempts to use contemporary Nazi laws to wrestle control of the perfume division, Chanel No 5, from her Jewish co-investors Pierre Wertheimer and his brother Jacques.

== Reception ==
In a negative review, in the New York Times, writer Judith Warner criticized Vaughan for relying too much on the primary source material without further analysis or elaboration. She states: "Vaughan seems to have felt as though his rich source materials could speak for themselves, but they don't - and he doesn't succeed in lending authority to the accounts of contemporary witnesses who were, undoubtedly, unreliable". Warner further criticized Vaughan for failing to provide the context in which Chanel was able to seamlessly integrate back into French society after the war. Warner concludes: "Despite all he knows about Chanel, Vaughan often appears to be as beguiled, disarmed and charmed by Coco as were the men in her life".

In a mixed review, in The Washington Post, author and journalist Marie Arana states "It's an astonishing story. And yet, its telling is far from perfect", further criticized Vaughan's writing style, stating "Vaughan's clichés and non-sequiturs abound - some of his phrases are simply not English". But regarding the book's drawbacks, Arana states: "But mid-book, the story is so gripping, the questions so provocative that, like his publisher, we no longer care".

With regard to her collaborationist past, Michael Korda applauded Vaughan stating: "Hal Vaughan has done a stupendous job of research", and Korda further praised Vaughan for his detailed and nuanced portrait of Chanel, stating: "What is of interest is Chanel herself, and on the subject Vaughan draws a brilliant portrait".
