= Chippinghurst Manor =

Historic country house in Oxfordshire, England

Coordinates: 51.70641°N 1.13118°W

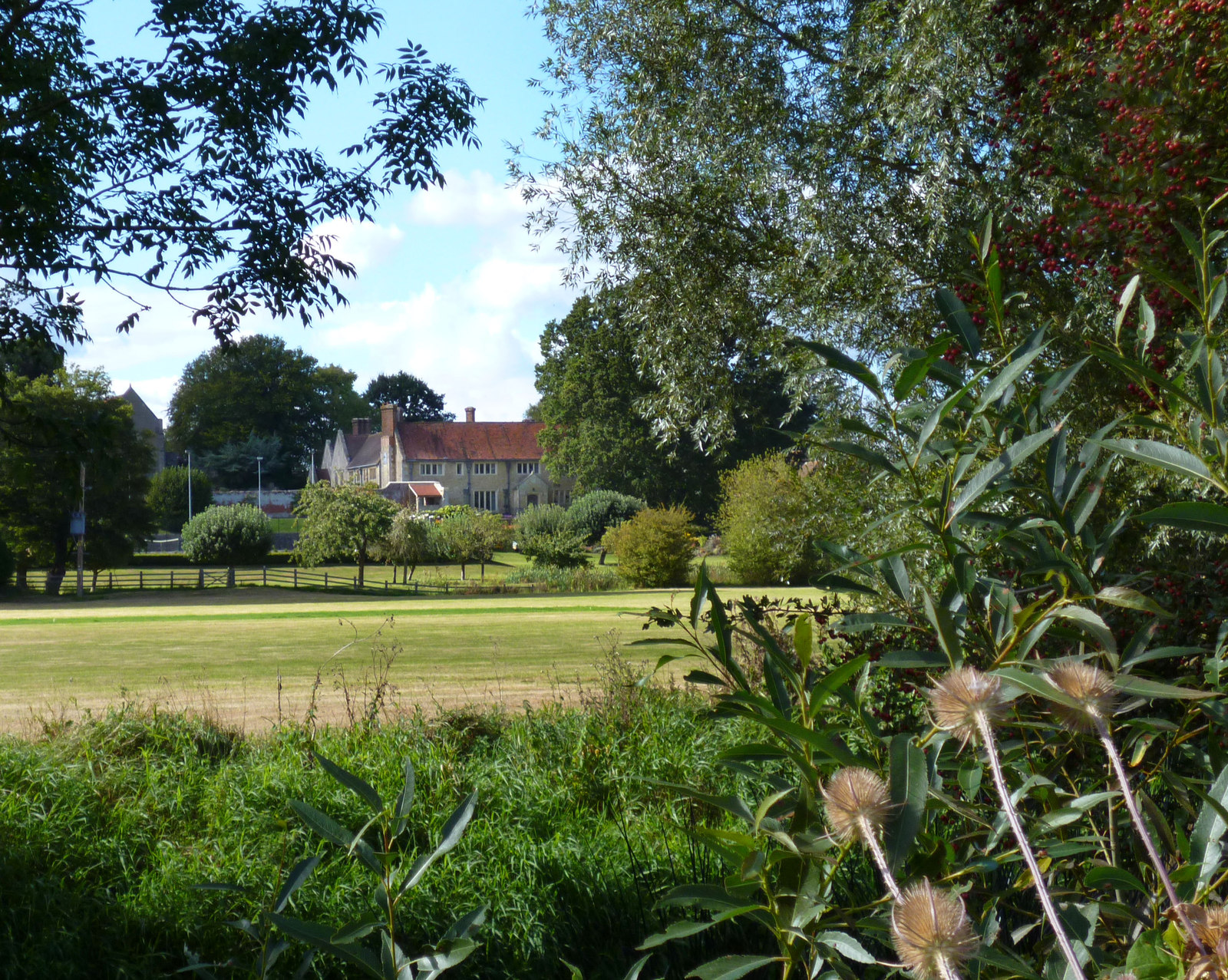
The manor house in 2012

Chippinghurst Manor is a Grade II listed country house in Oxfordshire, England, situated about 8 miles (13 km) south-east of Oxford.

The name of "Chippinghurst" manor means "the hill of Cibba" and appeared as "Cibbaherste" in the 1086 Domesday Book. The Saxon settlement there was part of the estate granted to Abingdon in 956, but by 1086 the hamlet and land, assessed as an area of three hides, had passed to William, Count of Évreux. There were two ploughs and one serf on the demesne; four villeins with two ploughs tended the rest of the manor.

The current manor house dates from the late 16th century. It was extended in 1937 by R. Fielding Dodd for James McDougall, of the flour firm, who acquired the property in 1931. The main house is built of coursed limestone rubble with ashlar stone quoins. It has a plain-tile roof with brick stacks. It is arranged in a U-shaped layout and has two storeys. The house was Grade II listed in 1963.

The couple John Ambler (1924–2008), a British businessman, and the Swedish Princess Margaretha, Mrs. Ambler (born 1934) lived here. The property has also been owned by the banker Sir Victor Blank.

The house is close to Cuddesdon and Denton (north), Garsington (northwest), and South Milton (east), in South Oxfordshire. The River Thame runs just to the east of the property. It is part of the hamlet of Chippinghurst.
