= Sleeping with the Enemy (novel) =

1987 novel by Nancy Price

- First edition cover
- Author: Nancy Price
- Language: English
- Genre: Fiction
- Publisher: Simon & Schuster
- Publication date: 1987
- Publication place: United States
- Media type: Print
- Pages: 332
- ISBN: 0671629670
- OCLC: 1027660577
- Dewey Decimal: 813.54
- LC Class: PS3566.R49

Sleeping with the Enemy is a novel written by Nancy Price and published in 1987. It served as the basis for the 1991 film Sleeping with the Enemy, starring Julia Roberts and Patrick Bergin.
