= Sleeping with the Enemy =

1991 American film by Joseph Ruben

- Theatrical release poster
- Directed by: Joseph Ruben
- Screenplay by: Ronald Bass
- Based on: Sleeping with the Enemy by Nancy Price
- Produced by: Leonard Goldberg
- Starring: Julia Roberts; Patrick Bergin; Kevin Anderson
- Cinematography: John Lindley
- Edited by: George Bowers
- Music by: Jerry Goldsmith
- Distributed by: 20th Century Fox
- Release date: February 8, 1991 (United States)
- Running time: 97 minutes
- Country: United States
- Language: English
- Budget: $19 million
- Box office: $175 million

Sleeping with the Enemy is a 1991 American psychological thriller film directed by Joseph Ruben and starring Julia Roberts, Patrick Bergin, and Kevin Anderson. The film is based on Nancy Price's 1987 novel of the same name. Roberts plays a woman who fakes her own death and moves from Cape Cod to Cedar Falls, Iowa, to escape her controlling, obsessive, and abusive husband, but finds her peaceful new life interrupted when he discovers her actions and tracks her down.

Sleeping with the Enemy was released theatrically by 20th Century Fox on February 8, 1991. It received generally negative reviews from critics, but it was a box-office success, grossing $175 million on a production budget of $19 million. The film also broke the record at the time for the highest domestic opening for a film with a female lead, grossing $13 million on its opening weekend and surpassing the previous record held by Aliens, which grossed $10 million in its first weekend.

== Plot ==
Laura Burney appears to have an idyllic life and a happy marriage to Martin, a successful Boston investment counselor. Beneath Martin's charming, handsome exterior, however, is an obsessive and controlling person who has physically, emotionally, and sexually abused Laura throughout their nearly four-year marriage. In a recurring pattern, he apologetically showers her with flowers and gifts following his acts of abuse.

Martin accepts an invitation from a neighbor for an evening sail. Although he believes that Laura fears water and cannot swim, he takes her with him anyway. As a severe storm unexpectedly breaks, Martin and the doctor struggle to control the vessel and Laura appears to be swept overboard. After an extensive Coast Guard search, Laura's body is never recovered. She is presumed dead from drowning, leaving Martin inconsolable.

Laura is actually alive. After secretly learning to swim, she faked her own death to escape Martin's abuse. During the storm, she jumped overboard, swam ashore, and returned home. She then cut her hair, donned a wig, flushed her wedding ring down the toilet, retrieved her stashed belongings and money, and headed to a nearby bus station.

Laura relocates from Cape Cod to Cedar Falls, Iowa. Previously, she had told Martin that her blind, stroke-impaired mother, Chloe, had died; however, Laura had secretly moved Chloe to an Iowa nursing home. Laura rents a house, finds a job, and settles into a new life as "Sara Waters". Her neighbor, Ben Woodward, a young drama teacher at a local college, is attracted to Laura, though he suspects she has a checkered past. They have an agreeable date, but when a kiss turns more physical, Laura resists and demands that Ben leave. She later admits to him that she escaped an abusive marriage.

Martin learns that Laura had taken swim lessons, leading him to believe she did not drown and is alive. His suspicion is confirmed when he finds Laura's wedding ring in the toilet, which had not properly flushed as she had believed. Masquerading as a detective, Martin travels to Chloe's nursing home and learns that Chloe's "nephew" has just visited. Laura, disguised as a man, is also at the nursing home and barely misses encountering Martin. Martin discovers Laura's whereabouts and learns about Ben. He trails the couple to Laura's new house and breaks in while she and Ben are outside. He also stalks them during their date at a local carnival. When Laura returns home, she realizes that Martin has been inside the house; the hand towels are perfectly aligned and the contents of the kitchen cabinets have been lined up according to Martin's exacting standards.

Martin then confronts Laura. Ben smashes the door down and attempts to subdue Martin, who knocks him unconscious. As Martin aims a gun at Ben, Laura distracts him by slamming her knee into his groin. She grabs Martin's gun and holds him at gunpoint. As Laura calls the police, Martin expects her to ask the police to protect her from him; she has done this in the past. Instead, Laura shocks Martin by telling the police she has killed an intruder. She then shoots Martin three times in the chest. A wounded Martin seizes Laura by the hair and grabs the gun, aiming it at her in a desperate attempt to kill her; however, the gun clicks empty. Martin then dies from his wounds. Laura and Ben share an embrace while waiting for the police.

== Cast ==
- Julia Roberts as Laura Williams Burney / Sara Waters
- Patrick Bergin as Martin Burney
- Kevin Anderson as Ben Woodward
- Elizabeth Lawrence as Chloe Williams
- Kyle Secor as John Fleishman
- Claudette Nevins as Dr. Rissner
- Tony Abatemarco as Locke
- Marita Geraghty as Julie
- Harley Venton as Garber
- Sandi Shackelford as Edna
- Bonnie Johnson as Iris Neppert

== Filming ==
Filming began in Wilmington, North Carolina on April 2, 1990 and continued through May 12. 1990.

== Release ==
=== Critical reception ===
As of July 2024, the film held a 24% "Rotten" rating on review aggregator Rotten Tomatoes the rating was based on 38 reviews with an average rating of 4.8/10. The site's consensus states: "A game Julia Roberts gives it her all, but Sleeping with the Enemy is one stalker thriller that's unlikely to inspire many obsessions of its own." On Metacritic, the film holds a weighted average score of 48 out of 100, based on 22 critics, indicating "mixed or average" reviews. However, audiences polled by CinemaScore gave the film an average grade of "A−" on an A+ to F scale.

Roger Ebert gave the film 1.5 stars out of a possible four. Ebert opined that while the film included good performances and "briefly seemed to have greatness in its grasp" during its early scenes, it quickly fell into cliches and plot holes and became "a slasher movie in disguise, an up-market version of the old exploitation formula where the victim can run, but she can't hide". Another mostly negative review came from Owen Gleiberman of Entertainment Weekly, who wrote that the film "has the bare bones of a tantalizing thriller" and praised Roberts' performance ("you can practically feel her pulse"), but also asserted that Bergin was too "mechanical" to be believable. Gleiberman placed some of the blame for the film's flaws on its "deadwood" script.

=== Box office ===
The film's opening ended Home Alone's twelve week run atop the box office. By the end of its run, the film had grossed $101,599,005 in the domestic box office; with an international total of $73,400,000, the film's worldwide gross was $174,999,005; based on a $19 million budget, the film was a box office success. The film was released in the United Kingdom on April 12, 1991, and opened on #2, behind Highlander II: The Quickening. The next week, the film remained in the same position.

== Soundtrack ==
The original music for the film was composed and conducted by Jerry Goldsmith. Columbia Records released an album concurrently with the film containing just over 38 minutes of score plus the Van Morrison song "Brown Eyed Girl". In 2011, La-La Land Records issued a limited edition album of 3500 copies expanding Goldsmith's score (but omitting the song).

== Home media ==
The film reached #1 in the rental charts in September 1991, and ended up as the ninth most rented movie that year in the United States. It was released on LaserDisc in Australia, the United States, United Kingdom and Japan by Fox Video in 1991. It also received various releases on VHS, was released on DVD on 2 September 2003, and subsequently entered the market of Blu-ray in June 2011.

=== Awards ===
The score by Jerry Goldsmith won the BMI Film Music Award, 1992, and the film was nominated for the Academy of Science Fiction, Fantasy & Horror Films Saturn Award for 1992 in four categories: Best Actress (Roberts), Saturn Award for Best Supporting Actor (Bergin), Best Horror Film and Best Music (Goldsmith).

== Remakes ==
In February 2019, it was reported that a remake of Sleeping with the Enemy was in development at Searchlight Pictures, with Nia DaCosta directing.

Several unofficial remakes of the film have been made in India: Yaraana, Daraar, Agni Sakshi, and Koi Mere Dil Se Poochhe.
