= Hal Vaughan =

American author and journalist (1928–2013)

Hal Weston Vaughan (1928–October 17, 2013) was an American author and journalist based in Paris, France. He held several posts as a US Foreign Service officer before becoming a journalist on assignments in Europe, the Middle East, and Southeast Asia.

He served in the United States military in both World War II and Korea. He was involved in a number of covert intelligence activities as a U.S. Foreign Service Officer at Karachi and Geneva during the Cold War. Vaughan had intimate knowledge of clandestine, international operations.

During his tenure with the United States Information Service (USIS), Vaughan developed documentary films in Pakistan. At the U.S. Embassy in Karachi and at the U.S. Consulate General in Dacca, East Pakistan, he covered events for the Voice of America (VOA). Later, Vaughan temporarily carried out duties in Saigon during the Vietnam War. As a U.S. Foreign Service Officer in Geneva, Vaughan served as Public Affairs Officer to Vice President Hubert Humphrey (during the Kennedy Round of Tariff Negotiations). Vaughan also held diplomatic posts under Ambassadors W. Michael Blumenthal and W. Averell Harriman.

In Cairo, Vaughan was a consultant to Prince Mohammed al-Faisal al-Saud. This stint resulted in a screenplay titled Bedouin that was optioned by Orion Pictures.

As a journalist, Vaughan worked for the New York Daily News and the International Press Service (IPS). He covered Mehmet Ali Agca's attempted assassination of Pope John Paul II for ABC-News in Rome, and later worked for ABC News Radio in New York.

Vaughan was a disabled (non-combatant) WWII veteran. Near the end of the Korean War, Vaughan, a National Guard Battalion Sergeant-Major (S-2) dealing with tactical intelligence. was mobilized at Fort Drum, Watertown, New York. His unit never made it overseas.

In a later career as an author, Vaughan drew from his wartime and intelligence experiences for his research and books. In 2004, his first book, Doctor to the Resistance: The Heroic True Story of an American Surgeon and His Family in Occupied Paris, was published by Brassey's Inc. Vaughan followed up with FDR's 12 Apostles: The Spies Who Paved the Way for the Invasion of North Africa, which was published in 2006 by The Lyons Press.

In August 2011, Vaughan published Sleeping with the Enemy: Coco Chanel's Secret War, published by Alfred A. Knopf. Based on newly declassified French and German intelligence materials of the war years, the book revealed never-before-told details of how Coco Chanel served the Abwehr as Agent 7124, code-name Westminster. Reports of the designer's covert activities include an attempt, at Himmler's behest, to get a message to Churchill in early 1944 that the SS wanted to broker a separate peace. Sleeping With the Enemy was translated into numerous languages and was met with critical acclaim.

At the time of his death in 2013, Vaughan had self-published a roman à clef, A Purple Heart At Far Acre Farm, about his experiences as a 10-year-old spy.

Vaughan was a member of Diplomatic and Consular Officers Retired (DACOR); Association of Former Intelligence Officers; the Paris Cercle de l'Union interalliée; and the National Press Club, Washington, D.C. He was also a consultant to the American Hospital of Paris at Neuilly since 1992. A polyglot, Vaughan was fluent in French, had a working knowledge of Italian, and had a passing acquaintance with German, Urdu, and Arabic.

Vaughan died October 17, 2013, in Paris. He is survived by his wife, Dr Phuong Gia, a physician; his son, Philippe, a security specialist in the foreign service; and a daughter, Chantal.
