= Dincklage =

Westphalian noble family

House of Dincklage
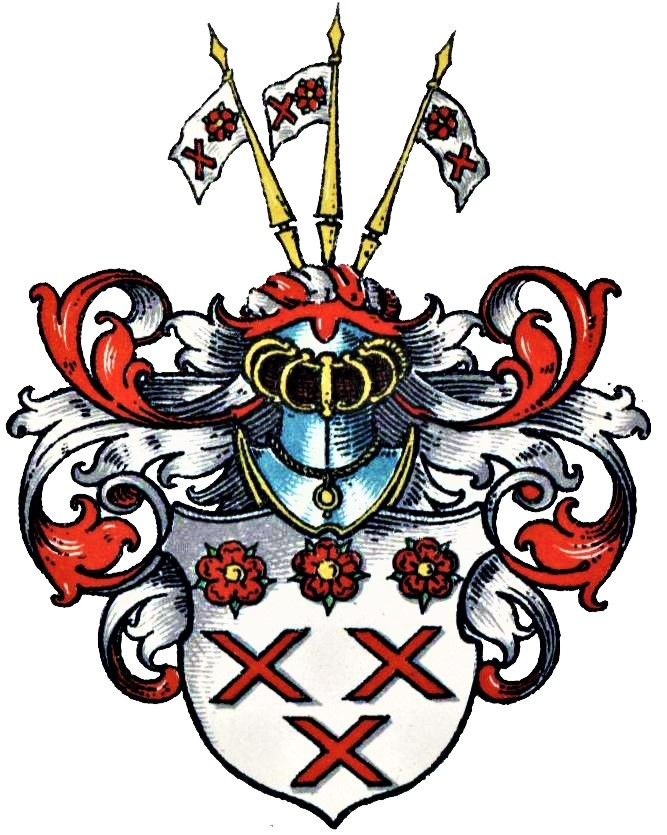
- Country: Germany
- Founded: 1231
- Founder: Johannes de Thinclage
- Titles: Baron, Freiherr
- Estates: Dinklage, Lower Saxony
- Cadet branches: Campe line, Schulenburg line

The Dincklage family (German pronunciation: [ˈdɪŋkˌlaːɡə]) is a German noble family of Westphalian ancient nobility from Dinklage near Vechta, Lower Saxony. There are currently still two lines of the family: the Campe line and the Schulenburg line. The family is first attested in 1231 with Johannes de Thinclage. The males of the family carry the title Baron or Freiherr.

== People ==
- Emmy von Dincklage (1825-1891), de:Emmy von Dincklage, German writer
- Clara von Dincklage-Campe (1829-1919), de:Clara von Dincklage-Campe, German writer
- Friedrich von Dincklage-Campe (1839-1918), de:Friedrich von Dincklage-Campe, German soldier and writer
