= Tiara of Maria II =

Jeweled ornamental crown made for Queen Maria II of Portugal

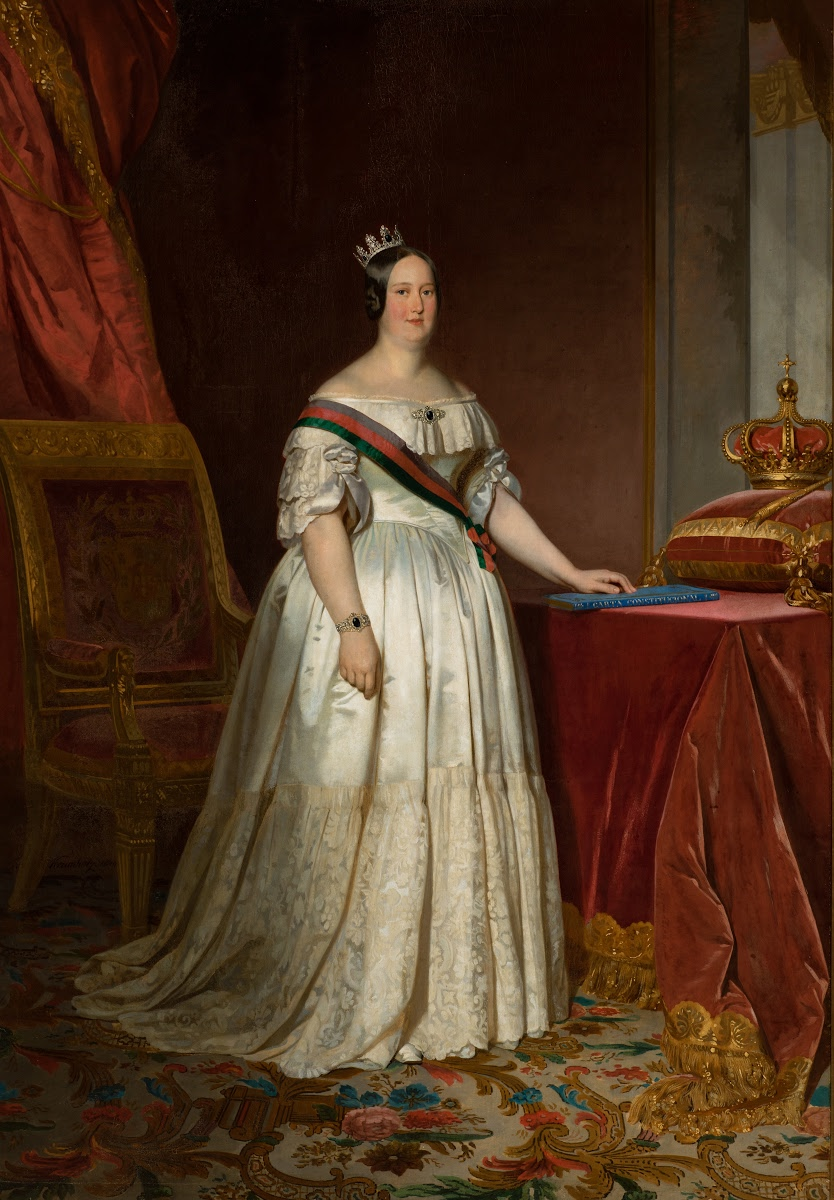
Queen Maria II wearing the tiara in an 1846 portrait by Ferdinand Krumholz (Ajuda National Palace)

The Tiara of Maria II (Portuguese: Tiara de D. Maria II) is a jewelled, ornamental crown made for Queen Maria II of Portugal in the 1830s-40s, set in sapphires and diamonds. It is the oldest extant tiara that can be linked to a Portuguese sovereign.

Having found its way to the Swedish royal family through inheritance, the jewel is currently in a private collection, having been sold at auction on 12 May 2021 by Christie's in Geneva.

== History ==
On stylistic grounds, the tiara can be dated to around the 1830s or the 1840s. It was certainly in the Queen's possession by 1846: it features in a portrait of the Queen by Ferdinand Krumholz, dated that year, that currently hangs in the Throne Room of Ajuda National Palace.

Maria II had been restored to the throne in 1834, after the conclusion of the Portuguese Civil War and the abdication and banishment of her uncle, usurper Miguel I. The young Queen had spent the duration of the Civil War in Paris, under the care of her stepmother, Amélie of Leuchtenberg: after her return to Lisbon, she introduced Parisian fashion and customs to the Portuguese court. Unlike what happened with previous monarchs, who usually sent envoys and plenipotentiaries abroad to buy fine luxury items and fashionable clothes on their behalf, the Queen chose her own jewellery herself, showing her cultured sensibilities and specific taste.

After the Queen's death in 1853, each of her seven children inherited part of their mother's private jewellery collection. The 1854 inventory, drawn up by court assayers João Pedro Lourenço and João Estanislau de Sousa, lists the tiara as "a diadem comprising nine detachable pieces, the central one largest... currently studded in one thousand four-hundred and fifteen brilliant-cut diamonds, five are missing"; the document values the tiara at 2.000$000 (2 contos de réis).

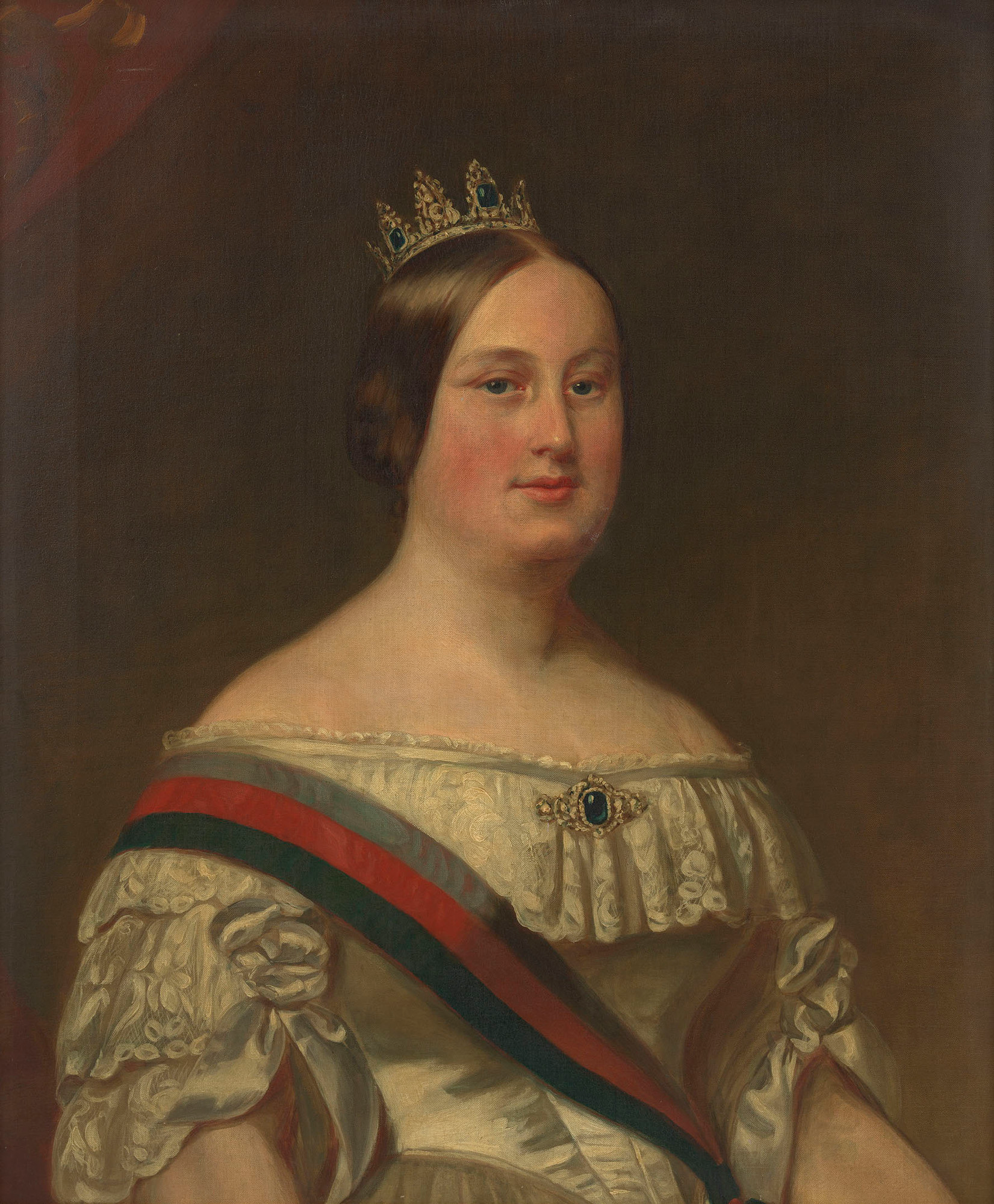
Portrait of Queen Maria II by William Corden the Younger, c. 1850; Royal Collection

Sources differ on whether the tiara was inherited by Infanta Maria Ana (who later married Prince George of Saxony) or by her younger sister, Infanta Antónia (who later married Leopold, Prince of Hohenzollern-Sigmaringen). It is known through their personal correspondence that the siblings exchanged some jewellery; it is therefore possible that this fact explains the discrepancy. Regardless of the precise chain of ownership, the descendants of both infantas were joined in marriage in 1920, when Frederick, Prince of Hohenzollern married Princess Margarete Karola of Saxony — who was photographed wearing the tiara in a formal portrait, and who also wore it during the celebrations of the wedding of her son, Prince Johann Georg of Hohenzollern, to Princess Birgitta of Sweden in 1961. Princess Birgitta also wore the tiara in public functions, including at the wedding of her cousin, Queen Margrethe II of Denmark, in 1967.

The tiara was sold at auction on 12 May 2021 by Christie's at the Four Seasons Hôtel des Bergues in Geneva, alongside a set of sapphire and diamond items that belonged to Napoleon's adoptive daughter Stéphanie de Beauharnais. Maria II's tiara fetched the highest bid among the ten imperial and royal items, at a realised price of 1.77 million francs (over €1.61 million), 10 times the lower end of pre-sale estimate. The Government of Portugal, through the Directorate-General for Cultural Heritage, had initially expressed interest in acquiring the tiara for its historical value, in order to include it in the collections of the planned Royal Treasure Museum. José Alberto Ribeiro, the director of Ajuda National Palace and the person who represented the government in the auction, immediately attempted to raise the necessary funds, but only managed to gather just under €1 million (of which €400 thousand came from patrons). Ribeiro had previously tried to make arrangements with the family that owned the tiara to try and buy the piece directly from them, but was unsuccessful.

== Details ==
The tiara is made of gold, comprising a plain base covered in brilliant-cut diamonds, on which rest nine individual sapphire and diamond ornaments. The central ornament is slightly larger than the rest, which are progressively slightly smaller than the preceding one; each alternate ornament is set with a single central octagonal step-cut or oval-shaped Burmese sapphire. In total, the tiara is set with 1415 diamonds of varying sizes.

The tiara is an example of versatile "transformable jewellery" that was innovative and in fashion at the time. The top elements of the tiara are detachable, forming nine individual brooches, and leaving the base of the tiara with its trefoil embellishments to be worn separately as a smaller bandeau-style tiara.
