= Leopold Prinz von Bayern =

German racing driver (born 1943)

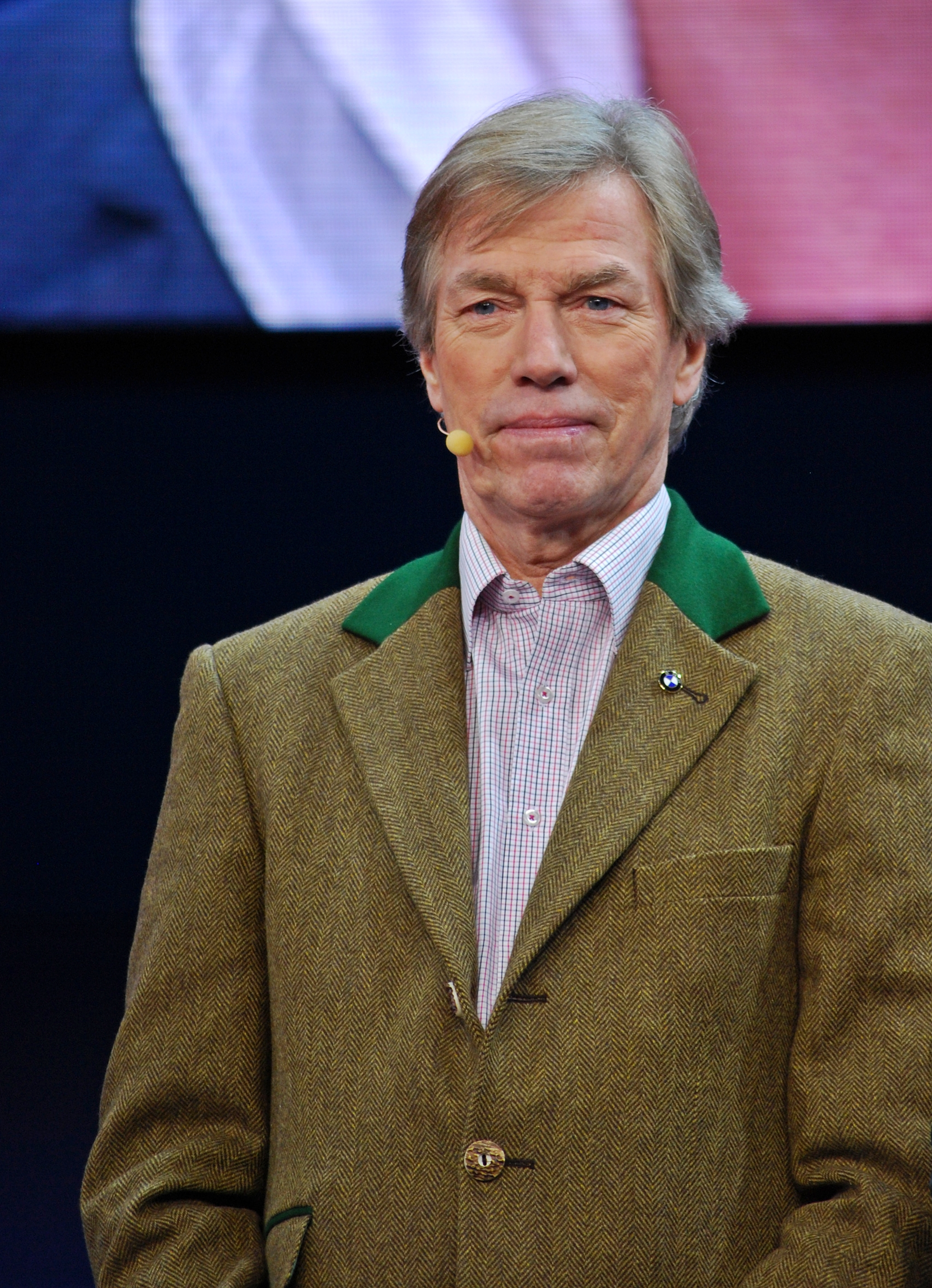
- Leopold in 2011
- Born: 21 June 1943 (age 83); Schloss Umkirch near Freiburg im Breisgau, Baden-Württemberg, Germany
- Spouse: Ursula Möhlenkamp (m. 1977)
- Issue: Prince Manuel; Princess Maria del Pilar; Princess Maria Felipa; Prince Konstantin
Names
- German: Leopold Rupprecht Ludwig Ferdinand Adalbert Friedrich Maria et omnes sancti Prinz von Bayern
- House: Wittelsbach
- Father: Prince Konstantin of Bavaria
- Mother: Princess Maria Adelgunde of Hohenzollern-Sigmaringen

Leopold Rupprecht Ludwig Ferdinand Adalbert Friedrich Maria et omnes sancti Prinz von Bayern (born 21 June 1943) is a member of the House of Wittelsbach and a former champion race car driver. He descends from King Ludwig I of Bavaria in direct line and is a distant relative to the current head of the house of Wittelsbach, Franz, Duke of Bavaria and his brother, Maximilian, Duke in Bavaria. He also descends from Austrian Emperor Franz Joseph and his wife Elisabeth and from King George II of Great Britain, and is therefore a distant cousin of Elizabeth II. As a Roman Catholic he is excluded from the line for the British throne by the Act of Settlement 1701. He also descends from Isabella II of Spain, through her daughter, and Leopold's great-grandmother, María de la Paz. He has a claim to the Throne of Portugal.

== Early life ==
Leopold (aka "Poldi") was born on Schloss Umkirch near Freiburg im Breisgau in Baden-Württemberg. He is the eldest son of Prince Konstantin of Bavaria and his first wife Princess Maria Adelgunde of Hohenzollern-Sigmaringen.

Since his parents separated soon after he was born, Leopold was raised by his grandparents Prince Friedrich von Hohenzollern-Sigmaringen and Princess Margarete Karola of Saxony. He grew up on Schloss Umkirch together with his uncle Prince Ferfried (aka "Foffie") who is only two months his senior. It was there the Prince developed his love for cars and racing.

== Marriage ==
On 21 October 1977, Prince Leopold married Ursula (Uschi) Möhlenkamp, the daughter of Wilhelm (Willi) Möhlenkamp and Ingeborg Brauckmann. The civil ceremony took place at Berg on Lake Starnberg in Bavaria. The religious ceremony followed a month later, on 19 November 1977 in Aufkirchen, Bavaria. Initially the union was considered morganatic, but on 3 March 1999 the marriage was decreed to be conditionally dynastic in accordance with the Bavarian house laws. The couple have four children:

- Prince Manuel Maria Alexander Leopold Jörg of Bavaria (b. out of wedlock on 27 December 1972, Starnberg, Bavaria, Germany); married Princess Anna of Sayn-Wittgenstein-Berleburg (b. 1978) in 2005. They have four children:
  - Prince Leopold Maria Bengt Karl Manuel of Bavaria (b. 13 June 2007).
  - Princess Alva Manuelle Maria Petra Yvonne of Bavaria (b. 5 January 2010).
  - Prince Gabriel Maria Abraham Ludwig Theodor of Bavaria (b. 11 November 2014).
  - Prince Joseph Carlos Maria Paul Melchior of Bavaria (b. 18 July 2019).
- Princess Maria del Pilar Birgitta Adelgunde Charlotte of Bavaria (b. 3 May 1978, Starnberg, Bavaria, Germany).
- Princess Maria Felipa Karin Marion Gabriele of Bavaria (b. 1 February 1981, Starnberg, Bavaria, Germany); married Christian Alexander Dienst (b. 1978) at Wies Church, Steingaden, Bavaria, Germany on 12 May 2012. They have three sons:
  - August Maria Jürgen Leopold Dienst (b. 2013).
  - Ferdinand Maria Konstantin Joachim Dienst (b. 2014).
  - Otto Dienst (b. 2017).
- Prince Konstantin Eugen Alexander Max-Emanuel Maria Ludwig Ferdinand Leopold of Bavaria (b. 8 November 1986, Starnberg, Bavaria, Germany); married Deniz Kaya (b. 1990), at St. Moritz's Eglise au Bois church, St Moritz, Switzerland, on 1 September 2018.
  - Prince Alexis of Bavaria (b. January 2020).
  - Prince Nikolaus of Bavaria (b. 10 August 2023).

== Later life ==
The Prince resides in a villa on the Lake Starnberg south of Munich, capital of Bavaria, and is often seen in the company of the current Swedish King Carl XVI Gustaf, whom he has known since his teens. He is a godfather to King Carl Gustaf's only son, Prince Carl Philip of Sweden. His maternal uncle Prince Johann Georg of Hohenzollern was King Carl Gustaf's brother-in-law. Prince Leopold is also involved with charitable causes helping disabled children, such as the Special Olympics and organizations promoting the use of animal-assisted therapy. This is in part because his oldest daughter Princess Pilar has a form of autism, which she developed as a baby after she was given the wrong anesthetic during heart surgery. On October 28, 2022, he was one of the two delegates who accompanied Elvis Presley's 1957 BMW 507, chassis # 70079, (and worth NOK 180,000,000, or $18,000,000), from its special exhibit at the BMW Welt Museum in Munich, Germany into that year's Oslo Motor Show, the other being Norbert Knerr from BMW Welt.

== Motor Racing career ==
Prince Leopold started his career with rallying and in 1969 moved to touring car racing winning the North American Championships with Porsche in 1972. In 1984, he also took part in the legendary sports car endurance race 24 Hours of Le Mans together with Walter Brun and Bob Akin, finishing fourth. In 1986, Leopold became a factory driver for the Munich based car manufacturer BMW and although he retired from competitive racing in 1998, he remains involved with the BMW racing team as an adviser.

As well as competing in Europe and America, Prince Leopold competed in Australia also with a drive the 1984 James Hardie 1000 driving a Group A BMW 635 CSi for Frank Gardner's factory backed JPS Team BMW, partnering 1967 Formula One World Champion Denny Hulme. In Australian touring car racing, Group A was only a minor class introduced for the endurance races in 1984 before taking over as top class in 1985. After a troubled week which included losing a day after the Prince crashed the BMW at the top of The Mountain due to a lost front wheel, the pair finished the race in 15th place and second in class, four laps behind the class winning TWR Rover Vitesse and 15 laps behind the race winning Holden Dealer Team Commodore. von Bayern (and Hulme) both had a new experience while racing at Bathurst in 1984. Their BMW was equipped with a racecam unit fitted in place of the left front headlight and both drivers were able to talk to the Channel 7 television commentary team while they were driving with the Prince saying at one point that "The race is very much fun for me".

== Racing record ==
=== Complete World Sportscar Championship results ===
(key) (Races in bold indicate pole position) (Races in italics indicate fastest lap)

| Year | Entrant | Class | Chassis | Engine | 1 | 2 | 3 | 4 | 5 | 6 | 7 | 8 | 9 | 10 | 11 | 12 | 13 | 14 | 15 | Pos. | Pts |
|---|---|---|---|---|---|---|---|---|---|---|---|---|---|---|---|---|---|---|---|---|---|
| 1971 | International Martini Racing Team | P 3.0 | Porsche 908/02 | Porsche 908 3.0 F8 | BUE | DAY | SEB | BRH | MNZ | SPA | TAR | NÜR; DNS | LMS | ÖST | GLN | | | | | (Note: No drivers' Championship.) | |
| 1972 | Tony Fischhaber | GT +2.0 | Porsche 911S | Porsche 2.4 F6 | BUE | DAY | SEB | BRH | MNZ | SPA | TAR | NÜR; 14 | LMS | ÖST | GLN | | | | | | |
| 1973 | Tony Fischhaber | GT +1.6 | Porsche 911 Carrera RS | Porsche 2.7 F6 | DAY | VAL | DIJ | MNZ | SPA | TAR | NÜR; 14 | LMS | ÖST | GLN | | | | | | | |
| 1977 | Jörg Obermoser | S 3.0 | Toj SC302 | Ford Cosworth DFV 3.0 V8 | DIJ | MNZ | VAL | PER | EST | LEC; Ret | IMO | SAL | | | | | | | | (Note: In 1976 and 1977 the World Championship was divided into two series that ran simultaneously but separately: The World Sportscar Championship and the World Championship for Makes.) | |
| 1981 | Helmut Marko RSM | GT | BMW M1 | BMW M88 3.5 L6 | DAY | SEB | MUG | MNZ | RSD | SIL | NÜR | LMS; Ret | PER | DAY | GLN | SPA | MOS | ROA | BRH | NC | 0 |
| 1983 | Brun Motorsport | B | BMW M1 | BMW M88 3.5 L6 | MNZ | SIL | NÜR; Ret | LMS; Ret | SPA | FUJ | | | | | | | | | | 64th | 4 |
| 1983 | R. Joest/Warsteiner | C | Porsche 936C | Porsche 935 2.8 F6t | | | | | | | KYA; 7 | | | | | | | | | 64th | 4 |
| 1984 | Brun Motorsport | C1 | Porsche 956B | Porsche Type 935/76 2.6 F6t | MNZ | SIL | LMS; 4 | | | | | | | | | | | | | 25th | 25 |
| 1984 | Brun Motorsport | C1 | Porsche 956 | Porsche Type 935/76 2.6 F6t | | | | NÜR; 9 | BRH; 8 | MOS | SPA | | | | | | | | | 25th | 25 |
| 1984 | Porsche Kremer Racing | C1 | Porsche 956B | Porsche Type 935/76 2.6 F6t | | | | | | | | IMO; 4 | FUJ | KYA | SAN | | | | | 25th | 25 |
| 1985 | Brun Motorsport | C1 | Porsche 956B | Porsche Type 935/76 2.6 F6t | MUG; DNS | MNZ | SIL | LMS | HOC | MOS | SPA | BRH | FUJ | SHA | | | | | | NC | 0 |

Footnotes

=== Complete 24 Hours of Le Mans results ===
| Year | Team | Co-Drivers | Car | Class | Laps | Pos. | Class Pos. |
|---|---|---|---|---|---|---|---|
| 1981 | (Austria) Helmut Marko RSM | (West Germany) Christian Danner (West Germany) Peter Oberndofer | BMW M1 | GT | 49 | DNF | DNF |
| 1983 | (Switzerland) Brun Motorsport GmbH | (Switzerland) Angelo Pallavicini (Denmark) Jens Winther | BMW M1 | B | 160 | DNF | DNF |
| 1984 | (Switzerland) Brun Motorsport GmbH | (Switzerland) Walter Brun (United States) Bob Akin | Porsche 956B | C1 | 340 | 4th | 4th |

=== Complete Deutsche Tourenwagen Meisterschaft results ===
(key) (Races in bold indicate pole position) (Races in italics indicate fastest lap)

| Year | Team | Car | 1 | 2 | 3 | 4 | 5 | 6 | 7 | 8 | 9 | 10 | 11 | 12 | 13 | 14 | 15 | 16 | 17 | 18 | 19 | 20 | 21 | 22 | 23 | 24 | Pos. | Pts |
|---|---|---|---|---|---|---|---|---|---|---|---|---|---|---|---|---|---|---|---|---|---|---|---|---|---|---|---|---|
| 1984 | Brun Motorsport | BMW 635 CSi | ZOL; 4 | HOC; Ret | AVU; 5 | AVU; 2 | MFA; 12 | WUN; Ret | NÜR | NÜR | NOR | NÜR; 6 | DIE | HOC; Ret | HOC; 8 | ZOL; 5 | NÜR | | | | | | | | | | 10th | 72.5 |
| 1988 | Euro Racing | BMW M3 | ZOL; 1 | ZOL; 2 | HOC; 1 | HOC; 2 | NÜR; 1 | NÜR; 2 | BRN; 1 | BRN; 2 | AVU; 1 | AVU; 2 | MFA; 1 | MFA; 2 | NÜR; 1 | NÜR; 2 | NOR; 1; 16 | NOR; 2; 20 | WUN; 1 | WUN; 2 | SAL; 1 | SAL; 2 | HUN; 1 | HUN; 2 | HOC; 1 | HOC; 2 | 46th | 3 |
| 1989 | GS Team | BMW M3 Evo | ZOL; 1 | ZOL; 2 | HOC; 1 | HOC; 2 | NÜR; 1 | NÜR; 2 | MFA; 1 DNQ | MFA; 2; 16 | AVU; 1 Ret | AVU; 2 Ret | NÜR; 1 | NÜR; 2 | NOR; 1; 25 | NOR; 2; 19 | HOC; 1 | HOC; 2 | DIE; 1 DNQ | DIE; 2; 18 | NÜR; 1; 23 | NÜR; 2; 25 | HOC; 1; 27 | HOC; 2; 14 | | | 36th | 9 |
| 1990 | BMW Team Isert | BMW M3 Sport Evo | ZOL; 1; 15 | ZOL; 2 Ret | HOC; 1 DNQ | HOC; 2 DNQ | NÜR; 1; 15 | NÜR; 2; 11 | AVU; 1; 17 | AVU; 2; 13 | MFA; 1; 20 | MFA; 2; 19 | WUN; 1; 17 | WUN; 2; 15 | NÜR; 1; 14 | NÜR; 2; 17 | NOR; 1; 9 | NOR; 2; 18 | DIE; 1; 17 | DIE; 2; 21 | NÜR; 1; 24 | NÜR; 2; 24 | HOC; 1 Ret | HOC; 2 DNS | | | 29th | 2 |
| 1991 | BMW Team Isert | BMW M3 Sport Evo | ZOL; 1; 26 | ZOL; 2 Ret | HOC; 1; 22 | HOC; 2 Ret | NÜR; 1; 27 | NÜR; 2 Ret | AVU; 1; 20 | AVU; 2; 22 | WUN; 1 | WUN; 2 | NOR; 1 Ret | NOR; 2 DNS | DIE; 1; 19 | DIE; 2; 10 | NÜR; 1; 21 | NÜR; 2 Ret | ALE; 1; 15 | ALE; 2 DNS | HOC; 1; 18 | HOC; 2; 22 | BRN; 1 | BRN; 2 | DON; 1 | DON; 2 | 29th | 1 |
| 1992 | BMW Team Isert | BMW M3 Sport Evo | ZOL; 1; 18 | ZOL; 2 Ret | NÜR; 1; 25 | NÜR; 2 Ret | WUN; 1; 21 | WUN; 2; 14 | AVU; 1; 18 | AVU; 2; 14 | HOC; 1 Ret | HOC; 2; 13 | NÜR; 1; 16 | NÜR; 2; 17 | NOR; 1 Ret | NOR; 2; 15 | BRN; 1; 10 | BRN; 2; 14 | DIE; 1 Ret | DIE; 2 Ret | ALE; 1 Ret | ALE; 2 DNS | NÜR; 1; 13 | NÜR; 2; 14 | HOC; 1; 15 | HOC; 2 Ret | 25th | 1 |

=== Complete Bathurst 1000 results ===
| Year | Team | Co-Drivers | Car | Class | Laps | Pos. | Class Pos. |
|---|---|---|---|---|---|---|---|
| 1984 | (Australia) JPS Team BMW | (New Zealand) Denny Hulme | BMW 635 CSi | Group A | 148 | 15th | **2nd** |

=== Complete World Touring Car Championship results ===
(key) (Races in bold indicate pole position) (Races in italics indicate fastest lap)

| Year | Team | Car | 1 | 2 | 3 | 4 | 5 | 6 | 7 | 8 | 9 | 10 | 11 | Pos. | Pts |
|---|---|---|---|---|---|---|---|---|---|---|---|---|---|---|---|
| 1987 | Schwaben Motorsport | BMW M3 | MNZ | JAR | DIJ | NÜR; Ret | SPA | BRN | SIL; Ret | BAT | CLD; Ret | WEL; 12 | FUJ | NC | 0 |

=== Complete Japanese Touring Car Championship results ===
(key) (Races in bold indicate pole position) (Races in italics indicate fastest lap)

| Year | Team | Car | 1 | 2 | 3 | 4 | 5 | 6 | 7 | 8 | 9 | 10 | 11 | 12 | 13 | 14 | 15 | 16 | 17 | 18 | Pos. | Pts |
|---|---|---|---|---|---|---|---|---|---|---|---|---|---|---|---|---|---|---|---|---|---|---|
| 1994 | BMW Team Schnitzer | BMW 318i | AUT; 1; 10 | AUT; 2; 9 | SUG; 1; 7 | SUG; 2; 7 | TOK; 1 | TOK; 2 | SUZ; 1 | SUZ; 2 | MIN; 1 Ret | MIN; 2 DNS | AID; 1; 10 | AID; 2; 6 | TSU; 1; 15 | TSU; 2 DNS | SEN; 1; 7 | SEN; 2; 8 | FUJ; 1 DNS | FUJ; 2 DNS | 15th | 24 |
| 1995 | BMW Team Schnitzer | BMW 318i | FUJ; 1 | FUJ; 2 | SUG; 1; 9 | SUG; 2; 9 | TOK; 1; 13 | TOK; 2; 16 | SUZ; 1; 9 | SUZ; 2; 9 | MIN; 1 | MIN; 2 | AID; 1 | AID; 2 | SEN; 1 | SEN; 2 | FUJ; 1 | FUJ; 2 | | | 20th | 8 |

=== Complete Super Tourenwagen Cup results ===
(key) (Races in bold indicate pole position) (Races in italics indicate fastest lap)

| Year | Team | Car | 1 | 2 | 3 | 4 | 5 | 6 | 7 | 8 | 9 | 10 | 11 | 12 | 13 | 14 | 15 | 16 | 17 | 18 | 19 | 20 | Pos. | Pts |
|---|---|---|---|---|---|---|---|---|---|---|---|---|---|---|---|---|---|---|---|---|---|---|---|---|
| 1996 | Isert BMW-Team | BMW 320i | ZOL; 1; 11 | ZOL; 2; 12 | ASS; 1 Ret | ASS; 2 DSQ | HOC; 1; 15 | HOC; 2 Ret | SAC; 1 | SAC; 2 | WUN; 1 | WUN; 2 | ZWE; 1 Ret | ZWE; 2 DNS | SAL; 1; 18 | SAL; 2; 15 | AVU; 1 Ret | AVU; 2; 15 | NÜR; 1; 22 | NÜR; 2; 18 | | | 24th | 67 |
| 1997 | Isert BMW-Team | BMW 320i | HOC; 1; 29 | HOC; 2; 17 | ZOL; 1 | ZOL; 2 | NÜR; 1; 15 | NÜR; 2; 14 | SAC; 1; 17 | SAC; 2; 10 | NOR; 1; 26 | NOR; 2 DNS | WUN; 1; 16 | WUN; 2; 21 | ZWE; 1; 26 | ZWE; 2; 18 | SAL; 1; 26 | SAL; 2; 23 | REG; 1; 17 | REG; 2; 15 | NÜR; 1 | NÜR; 2 | 22nd | 85 |
| 1998 | Team Isert | BMW 320i | HOC; 1; 20 | HOC; 2; 6 | NÜR; 1; 20 | NÜR; 2; 20 | SAC; 1; 20 | SAC; 2; 16 | NOR; 1 Ret | NOR; 2; 16 | REG; 1; 18 | REG; 2 Ret | WUN; 1 Ret | WUN; 2; 16 | ZWE; 1; 17 | ZWE; 2; 21 | SAL; 1; 17 | SAL; 2 Ret | OSC; 1; 19 | OSC; 2; 18 | NÜR; 1; 17 | NÜR; 2 Ret | 23rd | 98 |
