= Frederick, Prince of Hohenzollern =

Prince of Hohenzollern

Frederick
- Frederick in 1917

Prince of Hohenzollern
- Tenure: 22 October 1927 – 6 February 1965
- Predecessor: William
- Successor: Friedrich Wilhelm
- Born: 30 August 1891; Heiligendamm, Mecklenburg-Schwerin, German Empire
- Died: 6 February 1965 (aged 73); Krauchenwies, Baden-Württemberg, West Germany
- Spouse: Princess Margarete Karola of Saxony (m. 1920; died 1962)
- Issue: Princess Maria Antonia; Princess Maria Adelgunde; Princess Maria Theresia; Friedrich Wilhelm, Prince of Hohenzollern; Prince Franz Josef; Prince Johann Georg; Prince Ferfried
Names
- German: Friedrich Viktor Pius Alexander Leopold Karl Theodor Ferdinand
- House: Hohenzollern-Sigmaringen
- Father: William, Prince of Hohenzollern
- Mother: Princess Maria Teresa of Bourbon-Two Sicilies
- Religion: Roman Catholic

Frederick, Prince of Hohenzollern (German: Friedrich Viktor Pius Alexander Leopold Karl Theodor Ferdinand Fürst von Hohenzollern) (30 August 1891 – 6 February 1965) was the head of the Swabian branch of the House of Hohenzollern. He was the eldest son of William, Prince of Hohenzollern and Princess Maria Teresa of Bourbon-Two Sicilies. He had a twin brother, Franz Joseph, Prince of Hohenzollern-Emden, who was born a few minutes after he was.

== Life ==
After studying forestry and economics, he served with the 5th Reserve Mountain Battalion during World War I and retired from military service in 1919 with the rank of oberst. He then managed the Hohenzollern estate in Umkirch near Freiburg im Breisgau until his father's death in 1927. During the 1920s he was engaged in a dispute with the SPD Government over the use of his princely title and royal surname. The District President of the province of Hohenzollern, Alfons Scherer, informed the authorities in a circular dated July 9, 1928 that after the death of his father, Frederick had no right to either the predicate Highness nor the title Prince of Hohenzollern, arguing that the title had expired in 1927 with the death of Wilhelm Prince of Hohenzollern. This was resolved when Frederick threatened the city of Sigmaringen with moving his administration to Munich, prompting Minister of the Interior Carl Severing to put Scherer on leave.

Despite the adverse conditions during the global economic crisis of the early 1930s, Frederick managed to secure ownership of the family properties and its businesses, especially the extensive forest holdings in East Germany. He managed to buy back part of the art treasures that his father had already sold and thus save the Hohenzollern art collection.

Frederick was honorary chairman of the Silesian Maltese Knights of Law and head of the Stahlhelm in Württemberg and Baden. His affinity for cultivating military traditions led to a rapprochement with the Nazis. His younger twin brother joined the SS and in 1935 the Nazi state awarded Frederick the title of Royal Highness. He was however forbidden to serve in the German military because of Hitler's 1940 Prinzenerlass decree. From the early 1930s he served as Prince-Grand Prior of the Order of Saint Lazarus in Germany.

== Marriage and children ==
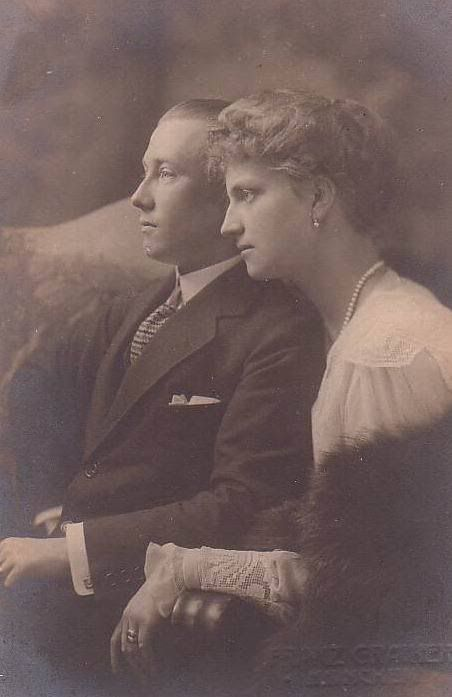
Frederick, Prince of Hohenzollern with his wife Princess Margarethe Karola of Saxony, 1920s.

He married Princess Margarete Karola of Saxony, daughter of Frederick Augustus III of Saxony and Archduchess Luise, Princess of Tuscany, on 2 June 1920 in Schloss Sibyllenort, Silesia, Germany. Margarete's sister Princess Maria Alix of Saxony subsequently married his twin brother, Francis Joseph.

Frederick and Margarete Karola had seven children:

- Princess Benedikta Maria Antonia Mathilde Anna of Hohenzollern (born 19 February 1921 in Sigmaringen; died 11 October 2011 in Sigmaringen), married Heinrich Maria, Count von Waldburg zu Wolfegg und Waldsee (born 16 September 1911 in Wolfegg; died 25 May 1972 in Stuttgart) on 4 January 1942, and had ten children (seven daughters and three sons)
- Princess Maria Adelgunde Alice Luise Josephine of Hohenzollern (born 19 February 1921 in Sigmaringen; died 23 May 2006 in Frauenfeld), married in 1942 (div 1948) Prince Konstantin of Bavaria. They had two sons, including Leopold Prinz von Bayern.
- Princess Maria Theresia Ludovika Cecilie Zita Elisabeth Hilda Agnes of Hohenzollern (born 11 October 1922 at Schloss Sigmaringen; died 13 December 2004)
- Prince Friedrich Wilhelm Ferdinand Joseph Maria Manuel Georg Meinrad Fidelis Benedikt Michael Hubert of Hohenzollern (born 3 February 1924 at Schloss Umkirch; died 16 September 2010)
- Prince Franz Josef Hubertus Maria Meinrad Michael of Hohenzollern (born 15 March 1926 at Schloss Umkirch; died 13 March 1996 in Sigmaringen), married 1st 1950 (div 1951) Princess Maria Ferdinande von Thurn und Taxis (born 19 December 1927; died 9 June 2018) and 2nd (civ) London 15 March 1955 (rel) Krauchenwies 16 April 1955 (div 1961) Princess Diana of Bourbon-Parma (born 22 May 1932 in Paris; died 4 May 2020 in Bad Krozingen), daughter of Prince Gaetano of Bourbon-Parma and Princess Margarete of Thurn and Taxis (youngest child of Robert I, Duke of Parma)
- Prince Johann Georg Carl Leopold Eitel-Friedrich Meinrad Maria Hubertus Michael of Hohenzollern (born 31 July 1932 at Schloss Sigmaringen; died 2 March 2016 in Munich) husband of Princess Birgitta of Sweden, sister of current King of Sweden.
- Prince Ferfried Maximilian Pius Meinrad Maria Hubert Michael Justinus of Hohenzollern (born 14 April 1943 at Schloss Umkirch; died 27 September 2022 at Großhadern Clinic in Munich)

== Romanian succession ==
In 1948, soon after the deposition of king Michael of Romania the line of succession was discussed during a meeting between Michael, his uncle Prince Nicholas of Romania, and Prince Frederick. Shortly after this meeting, the spokesman of King Carol II, in an interview with the French paper Le Figaro, expressed his strong support for Prince Frederick, additionally asserting that Michael would never regain the throne.

== Honours ==
He received the following awards:

- (Hohenzollern-Sigmaringen) Hohenzollern: Princely House Order of Hohenzollern, Cross of Honour 1st Class with Swords
- Kingdom of Prussia:
  - Order of the Red Eagle, Grand Cross with Oak Leaves
  - Iron Cross, 1st Class
- Duchy of Anhalt: Order of Albert the Bear, Grand Cross
- Baden:
  - House Order of Fidelity, Knight
  - Order of Berthold the First, Grand Cross
  - Order of the Zähringer Lion, Knight 2nd Class with Oak Leaves and Swords; Grand Cross
- Kingdom of Bavaria:
  - Order of St. Hubert, Knight
  - Order of Merit of the Bavarian Crown, Knight 2nd Class
- (Saxe-Coburg and Gotha) (Duchy of Saxe-Altenburg) (Saxe-Meiningen) Ernestine duchies: Saxe-Ernestine House Order, Grand Cross
- Hamburg: Hanseatic Cross
- Mecklenburg:
  - Military Merit Cross, 2nd Class (Schwerin)
  - Cross for Distinction in War, 2nd Class (Strelitz)
- (Austria-Hungary) Austro-Hungarian Imperial and Royal Family: Order of the Golden Fleece, Knight, 1950
- Sweden: Order of the Seraphim, Knight, 22 October 1936

== Ancestry ==
Ancestors of Frederick, Prince of Hohenzollern

8. Karl Anton, Prince of Hohenzollern
4. Leopold, Prince of Hohenzollern
9. Princess Josephine of Baden
2. William, Prince of Hohenzollern
10. Ferdinand II of Portugal
5. Infanta Antónia of Portugal
11. Maria II of Portugal
1. Frederick, Prince of Hohenzollern
12. Ferdinand II of the Two Sicilies
6. Prince Louis, Count of Trani
13. Archduchess Maria Theresa of Austria
3. Princess Maria Teresa of Bourbon-Two Sicilies
14. Duke Maximilian Joseph in Bavaria
7. Duchess Mathilde Ludovika in Bavaria
15. Princess Ludovika of Bavaria

Frederick, Prince of Hohenzollern House of Hohenzollern-Sigmaringen Cadet branch of the House of Hohenzollern Born: 30 August 1891 Died: 6 February 1965
German nobility
Preceded by William	Prince of Hohenzollern; 22 October 1927 – 6 February 1965	Succeeded by Frederick William
