= Konstantin Prinz von Bayern =

Bavarian prince (1920–1969)

- Born: 15 August 1920; Munich, Bavaria, Germany
- Died: 30 July 1969 (aged 48) plane crash near Hechingen, Baden-Württemberg, Germany
- Burial: Andechs Abbey cemetery, Andechs, Bavaria
- Spouse: Princess Maria Adelgunde of Hohenzollern (m. 1942; div. 1948) Countess Helene von Khevenhüller-Metsch (m. 1953)
- Issue: Prince Leopold; Prince Adalbert; Princess Ysabel
- House: Wittelsbach
- Father: Prince Adalbert of Bavaria
- Mother: Countess Auguste von Seefried auf Buttenheim

Konstantin Leopold Ludwig Adalbert Georg Thadeus Josef Petrus Johannes Antonius Franz von Assisi Assumption et omnes sancti Prinz von Bayern (15 August 1920 – 30 July 1969) was a member of the House of Wittelsbach, journalist, author and a German politician.

== Early life ==
Konstantin was born in Munich, Bavaria. He was the eldest son of Prince Adalbert of Bavaria and his wife Countess Auguste von Seefried auf Buttenheim.

In 1939, as most young German men of his age, the Prince was drafted to the military. However, his career in the German Army was short lived. In 1941, Prince Konstantin was relieved from all combat duties as a result of the so called Prinzenerlass and a year later started studying law at Albert-Ludwigs-Universität in Freiburg im Breisgau. After his graduation in 1944, he worked at the Higher Regional Court of Karlsruhe, but was arrested, as were most of his relatives, after the failed attempt to assassinate Adolf Hitler and remained imprisoned for the rest of World War II.

== Post World War II ==
After the war, Prince Konstantin began working as a journalist at the Neue Revue magazine, Süddeutsche Zeitung, and later on for the popular German magazine Bunte. In addition, in 1958 he published a biography of Pope Pius XII entitled Der Papst and three years later a historical reference book Ohne Macht und Herrlichkeit. He also became a member of the Christlich-Soziale Union in Bayern, one of the biggest political parties in Bavaria and was elected to the Bavarian state parliament in 1962 and in 1965 to the Bundestag.

== Marriage ==
On 26 August 1942, Prince Konstantin married Princess Maria Adelgunde of Hohenzollern-Sigmaringen, the daughter of Prince Friedrich von Hohenzollern-Sigmaringen and Princess Margarete Karola of Saxony. The wedding in Sigmaringen has been described as "the biggest society event during the war" (i.e. World War II). According to a contemporary, "a score of photographers and newsreel cameramen" were present at the procession from the castle.

The couple had two sons, but the marriage ended in divorce on 14 July 1948 and was annulled on 24 March 1950.

- Prince Leopold Rupprecht Ludwig Ferdinand Adalbert Friedrich Maria et omnes sancti of Bavaria (born 21 June 1943) he married Ursula Mohlenkamp on 21 October 1977. They have four children and nine grandchildren.
- Prince Adalbert Friedrich Johannes Maria et omnes sancti of Bavaria (born 27 December 1944) he married Marion Malkowski on 9 May 1978 and they were divorced on 11 November 1983. He remarried Sandra Burghardt on 21 February 1986. They have two children.

On 14 August 1953, Prince Konstantin married again, Countess Helene (Hella) von Khevenhüller-Metsch, the daughter of Count Franz von Khevenhüller-Metsch and Princess Anna von Fürstenberg. The civil ceremony took place at Sankt Georgen am Längsee in Carinthia and the religious wedding followed a day later at Hohenosterwitz. The couple had a daughter together.

- Princess Ysabel Helene Anna Augusta Maria de la Paz Ludovica-Fernanda et omnes sancti of Bavaria (born 20 July 1954) she married Count Alfred Hoyos on 30 May 1976. They have two children and six grandchildren.

Countess Helene was remarried to Prince Eugen of Bavaria on 27 November 1970.

== Death ==
Prince Konstantin of Bavaria died on 30 July 1969 in a plane crash near Hechingen, Baden-Württemberg and is buried at the Andechs Abbey cemetery in Bavaria.

== Ancestry ==
Ancestors of Konstantin Prinz von Bayern

8. Prince Adalbert of Bavaria
4. Prince Ludwig Ferdinand of Bavaria
9. Infanta Amalia of Spain
2. Prince Adalbert of Bavaria
10. Infante Francisco de Asís of Spain
5. Infanta María de la Paz of Spain
11. Isabella II of Spain
1. Prince Konstantin of Bavaria
12. Count Ludwig von Seefried auf Buttenheim
6. Count Otto von Seefried auf Buttenheim
13. Emilie von Schmaltz
3. Countess Auguste von Seefried auf Buttenheim
14. Prince Leopold of Bavaria
7. Princess Elisabeth Marie of Bavaria
15. Archduchess Gisela of Austria

== Published works ==
- Nach der Sintflut. Konstantin, Prinz von Bayern - Bergisch Gladbach : Lübbe, 1988
- Nach der Sintflut. Konstantin, Prinz von Bayern - München : Süddeutscher Verlag, 1986
- Papst Pius XII. [der Zwölfte], Konstantin, Prinz von Bayern - Stein am Rhein : Christiana-Verlag, 1980, 38. - 42. Tsd.
- Des Königs schönste Damen. Konstantin, Prinz von Bayern - München : Süddeutscher Verlag, 1980
- Prinz und Demokrat. Konstantin von Bayern. Konstantin, Prinz von Bayern - München : Langen/Müller, 1970
- Die Zukunft sichern. Konstantin, Prinz von Bayern - Stuttgart-Degerloch : Seewald, 1969
- Ohne Macht und Herrlichkeit. Konstantin, Prinz von Bayern - München : List, 1961
- Der Papst. Konstantin, Prinz von Bayern - [Gütersloh] : Bertelsmann Lesering, 1959
- Der Papst. Konstantin, Prinz von Bayern - München : Kindler, 1958, 27. - 29. Tsd.
- Der Papst. Konstantin, Prinz von Bayern - Frankfurt/M. : Ullstein Taschenbücher-Verl., 1958
