= Prince Adalbert of Bavaria =

Prince Adalbert of Bavaria is the name of:

- Prince Adalbert of Bavaria (1828–1875), ninth child and fourth son of Ludwig I of Bavaria and Therese of Saxe-Hildburghausen
- Prince Adalbert of Bavaria (1886–1970), member of the Bavarian Royal House of Wittelsbach, grandson of the above, historian, author and a German Ambassador to Spain
