= Prince Adalbert of Bavaria (1886–1970) =

German prince and diplomat

Prince Adalbert
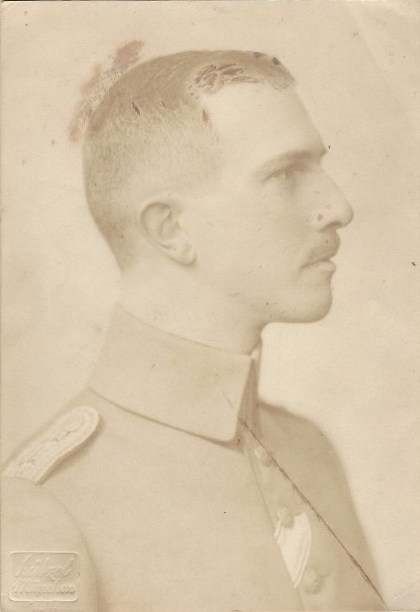
- Photograph, 1916.
- Born: 3 June 1886; Munich, Bavaria
- Died: 29 December 1970 (aged 84); Munich, Bavaria
- Burial: Andechs Abbey cemetery, Andechs, Bavaria
- Spouse: Countess Auguste von Seefried auf Buttenheim (m. 1919)
- Issue: Prince Konstantin; Prince Alexander
- House: Wittelsbach
- Father: Prince Ludwig Ferdinand of Bavaria
- Mother: Infanta María de la Paz of Spain
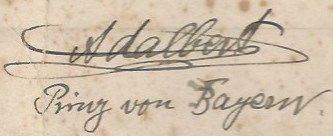
- Signature

Prince Adalbert of Bavaria (German: Adalbert Alfons Maria Ascension Antonius Hubertus Joseph omnes sancti Prinz von Bayern) (3 June 1886 – 29 December 1970) was a member of the Bavarian Royal House of Wittelsbach, historian, author and a German Ambassador to Spain.

== Early life ==
Adalbert was born at the Nymphenburg Palace in Munich, Bavaria. He was the second son of Prince Ludwig Ferdinand of Bavaria and his wife Infanta María de la Paz of Spain.

As was the case with most of his peers, following the Abitur, Adalbert joined the Bavarian Army and remained an officer throughout the First World War. He served with the artillery as a battery commander and later as a General Staff and a cavalry officer on both the Western and the Eastern Fronts. For his merits during the war, Prince Adalbert was decorated with the Bavarian Military Merit Order, 4th Class with Crown and Swords, the Iron Cross 1st and 2nd Class, the Austro-Hungarian Military Merit Cross 3rd Class with War Decoration 3rd Class, the Brunswick War Merit Cross 2nd Class, the Ottoman Golden Liakat Medal and the Ottoman War Medal.

== 1920s-1940s ==
After Germany's defeat in 1918, Prince Adalbert left the military and began to study history at the Ludwig-Maximilians-Universität München; later publishing several works on Bavarian and royal history. With the outbreak of World War II, Adalbert was recalled back to the military and served as a staff officer under close family friend Wilhelm Ritter von Leeb. With the Army Group C, he took part in the German invasion of France, but his return to the German Army was short-lived. In early 1941, Prince Adalbert was relieved from all combat duties as a result of the so-called Prinzenerlass. By this decree, Hitler ordered that all members of the former German reigning royal houses were forbidden from joining or participating in any military operations in the Wehrmacht. Later, in May 1941, Prince Adalbert was cashiered from the military and withdrew to the family castle Hohenschwangau in southern Bavaria, where he lived for the rest of the war.

== Post World War II ==
After the war he worked shortly for the Bavarian Red Cross office and in 1952 was appointed by Konrad Adenauer as the Ambassador of the Federal Republic of Germany to Spain. He remained in this post until 1956.

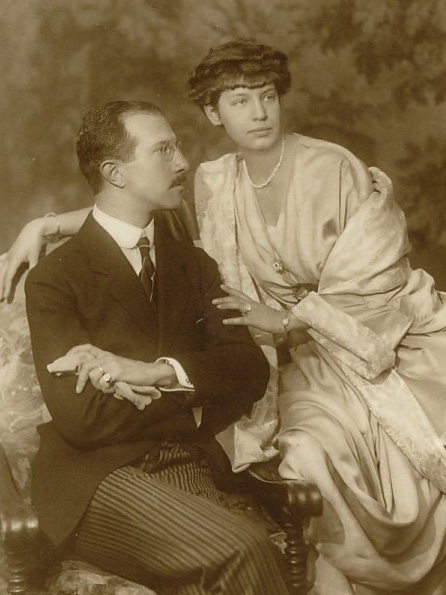
Adalbert with his wife in 1919

== Marriage ==
On 12 June 1919, Prince Adalbert married Countess Augusta von Seefried auf Buttenheim (1899–1978), the daughter of Count Otto von Seefried auf Buttenheim and Princess Elisabeth Marie of Bavaria. The wedding took place in Salzburg, Austria. They had two sons:

- Prince Konstantin of Bavaria (15 August 1920 – 30 July 1969)
- Prince Alexander of Bavaria (12 June 1923 – 6 May 2001), was single and had no issue.

== Death ==
Prince Adalbert of Bavaria died on 29 December 1970 at Munich and is buried at the Andechs Abbey cemetery in Bavaria.

== Ancestry ==
Ancestors of Prince Adalbert of Bavaria (1886–1970)

8. Ludwig I of Bavaria
4. Prince Adalbert of Bavaria
9. Princess Therese of Saxe-Hildburghausen
2. Prince Ludwig Ferdinand of Bavaria
10. Infante Francisco de Paula of Spain (= 12)
5. Infanta Amalia of Spain
11. Princess Luisa Carlotta of the Two Sicilies (= 13)
1. Prince Adalbert of Bavaria
12. Infante Francisco de Paula of Spain (= 10)
6. Infante Francisco de Asís of Spain
13. Princess Luisa Carlotta of the Two Sicilies (= 11)
3. Infanta María de la Paz of Spain
14. Ferdinand VII of Spain
7. Isabella II of Spain
15. Princess Maria Christina of the Two Sicilies

== Published works ==
- Das Ende der Habsburger in Spanien (2 volumes). Bruckmann Verlag, Munich 1929
- Vier Revolutionen und einiges dazwischen. Siebzig Jahre aus dem Leben der Prinzessin Ludwig Ferdinand von Bayern, Infantin von Spanien. Hans Eder Verlag, München, 1932
- An Europas Fürstenhöfen. Lebenserinnerung der Infantin Eulalia von Spanien 1864–1931. Verlag Robert Lutz Nachfolger Otto Schramm, Stuttgart, 1936
- Eugen Beauharnais. Der Stiefsohn Napoleons. Ein Lebensbild. Propyläen Verlag, Berlin, 1940
- Nymphenburg und seine Bewohner. Oldenbourg Verlag, München, 1949
- Max I. Joseph von Bayern. Pfalzgraf, Kurfürst und König. Bruckmann Verlag, München, 1957
- Die Herzen der Leuchtenberg. Chronik einer napoleonisch-bayerisch-europäischen Familie. Prestel Verlag, München, 1963
- Der Herzog und die Tänzerin. Die merkwürdige Geschichte Christians IV. von Pfalz-Zweibrücken und seiner Familie. Pfälzische Verlagsanstalt, Neustadt/Weinstraße, 1966
- Als die Residenz noch Residenz war. Prestel Verlag, München, 1967
- Die Wittelsbacher. Geschichte unserer Familie. Prestel Verlag, München, 1979
- Erinnerungen 1900–1956. Langen-Müller Verlag, München, 1991
