= Ortenburger Heritage Conflict =

Property dispute

The Ortenburger Heritage Conflict (German: Ortenburger Erbstreit) was a dispute about the property of the Counts of Ortenburg in Carinthia from the 15th century.

== Sequence ==
When the Counts of Celje died out in 1456, the Bavarian Counts of Ortenburg-Neuortenburg, a branch of the noble family of Spanheimer, made a false claim to the County of Ortenburg in Carinthia. The Bavarian counts assumed that their family founded the Carinthian lineage, and that the regents of the Carinthian county had come from Bavaria and the regents of the Bavarian county from Carinthia. In fact, neither an agnatic (patrilineal) nor a marital connection between the two houses has been established.

To strengthen his claim to the Carinthian county, Bavarian Count Johann II, son of Sebastian I, followed the call to arms of the King of the Romans Maximilian I against Switzerland. In return, Maximilian had supposedly promised to enfeoff Johann with the Carinthian County and to marry him to the rich heiress of the last Lords of Wallsee. Johann, however, fell at the Battle of Dornach, and ownership of the Carinthian County remained elsewhere.

In 1530 the Bavarian Ortenburg Count Christoph I took part in the Reichstag in Augsburg, where to his astonishment he encountered a Count of Ortenburg: Count Gabriel von Salamanca-Ortenburg. The latter had come to Germany in 1524 as follower of Holy Roman Emperor Charles V and was enfeoffed with the Carinthian County. Christoph and his associates claimed to the Emperor that they should be recognized as the true heirs to the County in Carinthia, but were unsuccessful. From then on, therefore, Christoph named his family "Counts of Ortenburg of the older family" and modified the name from the original "Ortenberg" into "Ortenburg".

As a further signal of their claim, in the middle of the 16th century the Bavarian counts took the coat of arms of the Carinthian county as a part of their coat of arms. The claim was maintained until the middle of the 18th century, but then dropped. The coat of arms was restored in the middle of the 19th century to the original line embattled-counter-embattled on a red ground.

== Literature ==
- (in German) Hausmann, Friedrich: Die Grafen zu Ortenburg und ihre Vorfahren im Mannesstamm, die Spanheimer in Kärnten, Sachsen und Bayern, sowie deren Nebenlinien. In: Ostbairische Grenzmarken - Passauer Jahrbuch für Geschichte Kunst und Volkskunde. Nr. 36, Passau 1994
- (in German) Ortenburg-Tambach, Eberhard Graf zu: Geschichte des reichsständischen, herzoglichen und gräflichen Gesamthauses Ortenburg. Teil 2: Das gräfliche Haus in Bayern. Vilshofen 1932
