= Marc Bohan =

French fashion designer (1926–2023)

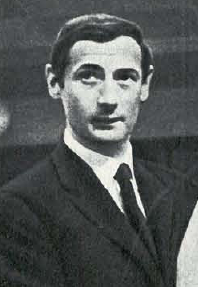
- Born: Roger Maurice Louis Bohan; 22 August 1926; Paris, France
- Died: 6 September 2023 (aged 97); Châtillon-sur-Seine, Côte-d'Or, France
- Occupation: Fashion designer
- Years active: 1945–2023
- Employer: Christian Dior
- Known for: Creative director of Christian Dior (1960–1989)
- Spouse(s): Dominique Gaborit (m. 1950; died 1962); Huguette Rinjonneau
- Awards: Chevalier of the Legion of Honour (1979)

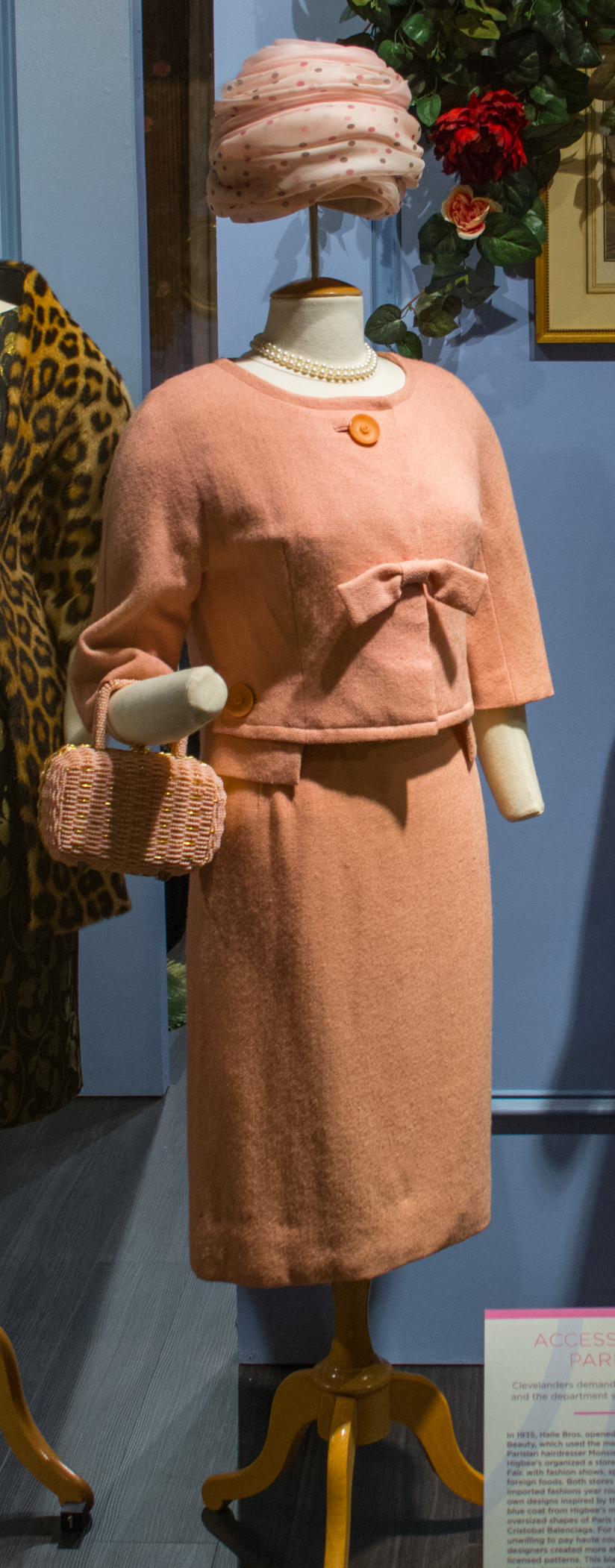
1955 Bohan for Jean Patou women's suit

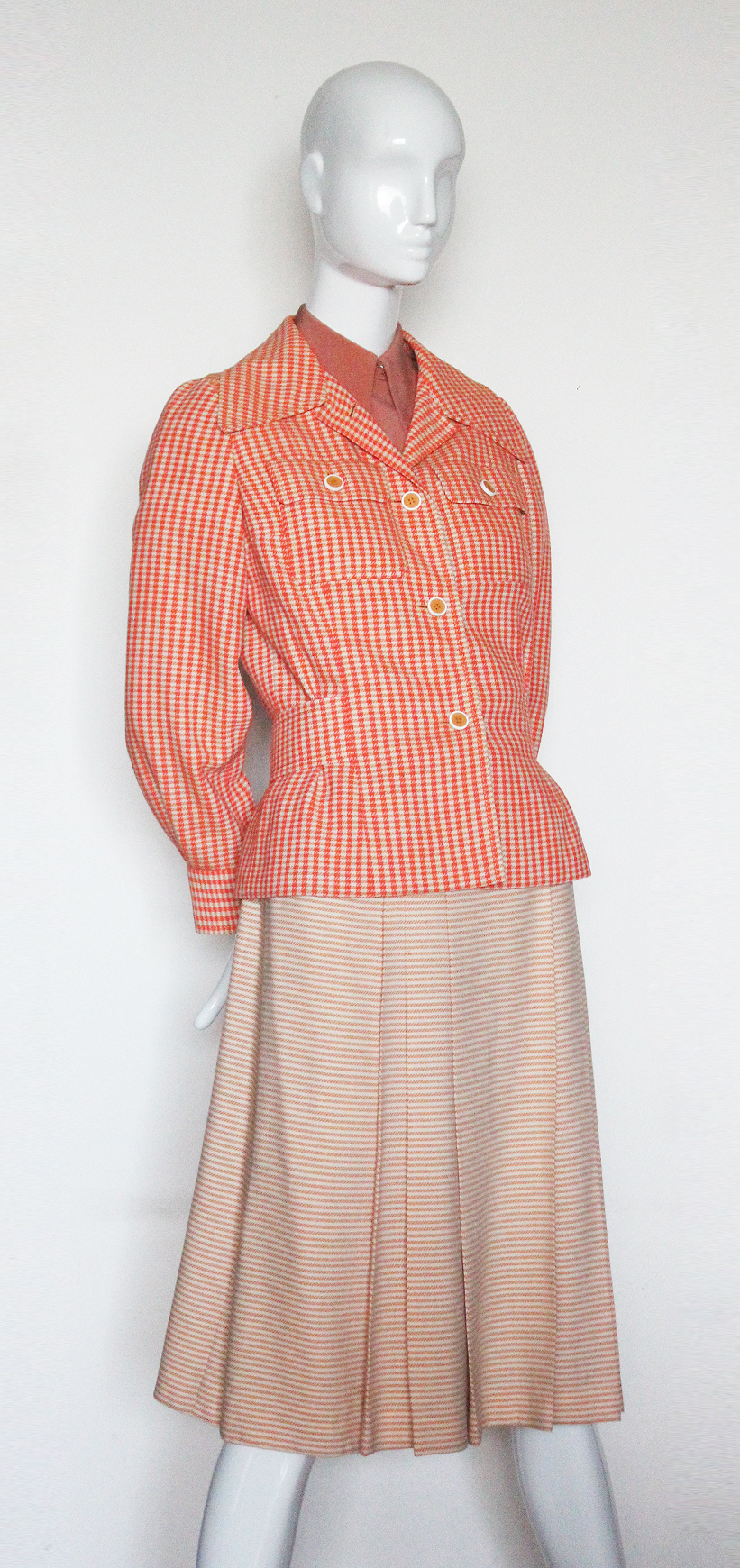
1973 Bohan for Dior suit, haute couture, Spring/Summer 1973. Adnan Ege Kutay Collection.

Roger Maurice Louis Bohan (French pronunciation: [ʁɔʒe mɔʁis lwi bɔɑ̃]; 22 August 1926 – 6 September 2023) was a French fashion designer, best known for his 30-year career at the house of Dior.

== Early life and career ==
Bohan was born in Paris and grew up in Sceaux. As a child, he was encouraged into fashion by his mother, who worked as a milliner.

After school at the Lycée Lakanal, in 1945 he secured a job at Robert Piguet where he remained for four years.

In 1949, he accepted a job as an assistant to Edward Molyneux. He worked as a designer for Madeleine de Rauch in 1952, before briefly opening his own Paris salon and producing one collection in 1953. In 1954, Bohan was offered a job at Jean Patou, designing the haute couture collection, where he stayed until 1958. In 1991, he was appointed for two years as guest-professor for fashion design at the University of Applied Arts Vienna, Austria.

== Christian Dior ==
From 1958 to 1960 Bohan designed for the Christian Dior, London line. In September 1960, Dior's creative director Yves Saint Laurent was called up for military service; Bohan was promoted to replace him.

His deceptively simple, elegant designs drew their inspiration from the 1920s, and rejected the extremes of contemporary fashion. One notable collection in 1966 was inspired by the Russian style of Doctor Zhivago.

Bohan's classic pieces are now found in museum collections around the world. In 2009, the Musee Christian Dior at Granville held a major Bohan retrospective.

In 1989 Bohan left Dior, before joining the house of Norman Hartnell in London, where he worked for the label until 1992. Thereafter Bohan designed under his own name.

== Notable clients ==
Bohan designed for Princess Grace of Monaco, Lynn Wyatt, and Betsy Bloomingdale. Princess Grace supported Bohan by opening the Baby Dior boutique in 1967. Actress Sophia Loren was also among his many clients.

Jacqueline Kennedy admired Bohan's designs and had them adapted by Oleg Cassini and Chez Ninon.

In 1976, Bohan was chosen to design the wedding dress of Silvia Sommerlath at her wedding to King Carl XVI Gustaf of Sweden.

Two years later, he designed the wedding gown of Princess Caroline of Monaco for her 1978 wedding to Philippe Junot.

== Personal life and death ==
Bohan's first wife, Dominique Gaborit, whom he married in 1950, died in a car accident in June 1962. He then married Huguette Rinjonneau. They had one daughter: Marie-Anne.

Bohan made a home at a restored 18th-century country house in Châtillon-sur-Seine, Burgundy.

He died at his home on 6 September 2023, at the age of 97.

== Awards ==
- Sports Illustrated Designer of the Year award, 1963;
- Schiffli Lace and Embroidery Institute award, 1963;
- Chevalier de la Legion d'Honneur, 1979;
- Ordre de Saint Charles, Monaco.
