= Wedding of Carl XVI Gustaf and Silvia Sommerlath =

1976 Swedish royal wedding

- King Carl XVI Gustaf and Queen Silvia's dual cypher
- Date: 19 June 1976; 50 years ago
- Venue: Storkyrkan
- Location: Stockholm, Sweden
- Participants: Carl XVI Gustaf; Silvia Sommerlath

LP of the wedding of King Carl XVI Gustaf and Silvia Sommerlath

The wedding of Carl XVI Gustaf and Silvia Sommerlath took place on Friday, 19 June 1976 at Storkyrkan. Carl XVI Gustaf had been king of Sweden since 1973 and Sommerlath was a German-born translator. The couple had met at the 1972 Summer Olympic Games in Munich and became engaged in 1976.

The archbishop of Uppsala, Olof Sundby, presided over the Church of Sweden ceremony in Storkyrkan. The ceremony was attended by the bride's and groom's families, as well as members of foreign royal families, diplomats, and various Swedish and German officials.

It was the first marriage of a reigning Swedish monarch since King Gustav IV Adolf married Princess Frederica of Baden in 1797. Sommerlath became Sweden's first queen consort since 1965.

== Engagement ==
In 1972, then Crown Prince Carl Gustaf attended the Summer Olympics in Munich, West Germany, where interpreter Silvia Sommerlath was charged with escorting him. In a later interview, the King explained how it just "clicked" when they met. In the subsequent years, Carl Gustaf's mother, Princess Sibylla, died, as did his grandfather, Gustaf VI Adolf, and he, therefore, acceded to the Swedish throne.

On 12 March 1976, King Carl XVI Gustaf announced his engagement to Silvia Sommerlath. The King presented his fiancée with a single solitaire ring set with a 2-carat diamond. The ring once belonged to his late mother.

The date was set for 19 June. The same date that the future King Oscar I married Josephine of Leuchtenberg in 1823 and their son, the future King Carl XV married Princess Louise of the Netherlands in 1850. 34 years later, their daughter, Victoria, married Daniel Westling on the same date in the same cathedral.

== Pre-wedding celebrations ==
Sommerlath was unable to join the King for the celebrations of Sweden's National Day on 6 June due to illness. Despite her illness, she was present when the banns of marriage were read the following day in the Royal Chapel.

On 17 June, Sommerlath was given the Royal Order of the Seraphim and became a Swedish citizen. On 18 June, a gala performance was at the Royal Swedish Opera where Swedish pop group ABBA first performed their song Dancing Queen in honour of their queen-to-be. The gala performance was followed by a ball at Drottningholm Palace. At the insistence of the king's sisters, Silvia wore the Connaught Diamond Tiara which had been a favourite of their late mother.

== Wedding ==
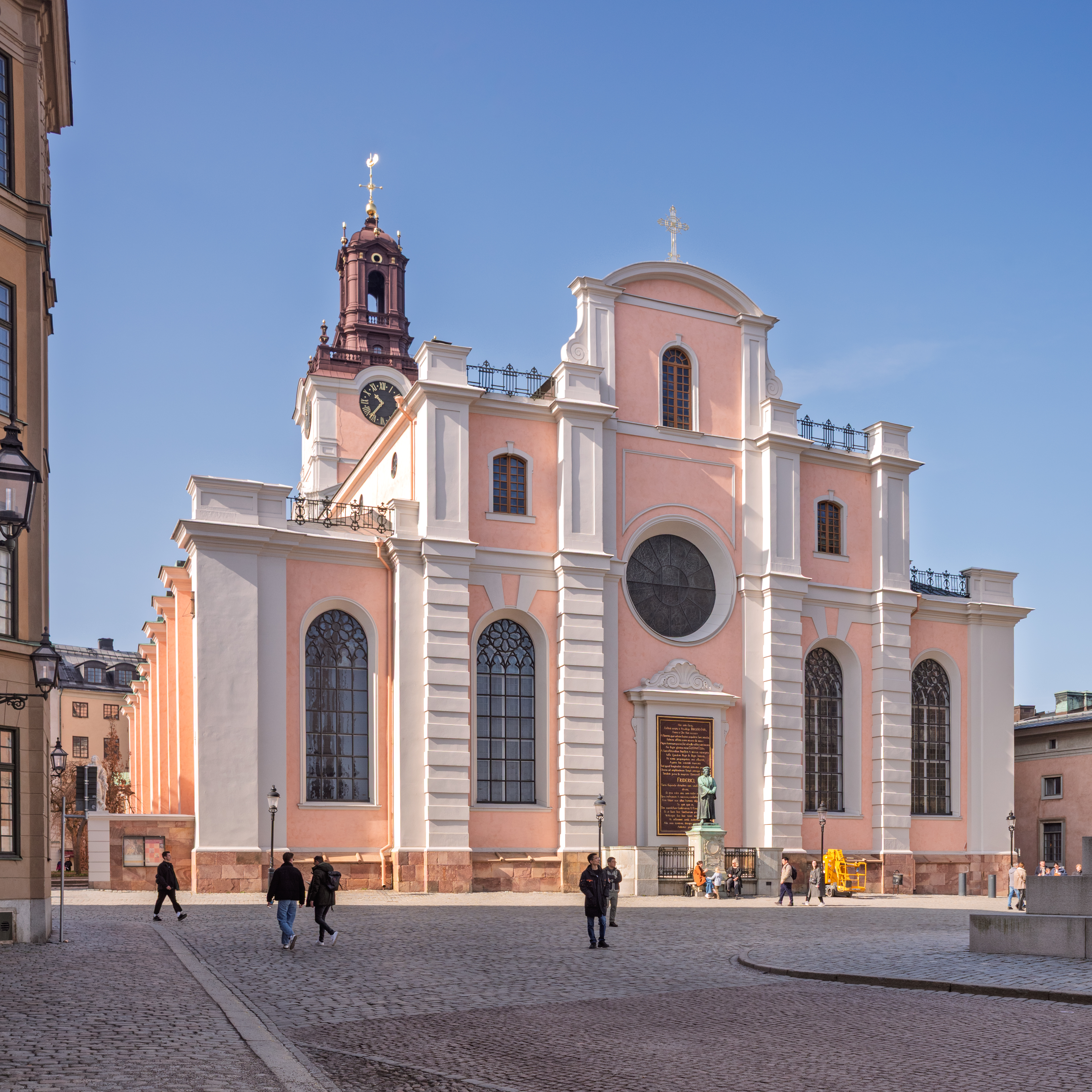
Storkyrkan, where the wedding was celebrated

The wedding began at 12:00 CET on 19 June 1976. The Church of Sweden ceremony was officiated by Olof Sundby, Archbishop of Uppsala, in Storkyrkan, the bride's uncle, theologian The Rev. Dr Ernst Sommerlath, assisted. At approximately 12:45, the marriage was solemnized and Sommerlath automatically became Queen consort of Sweden.

=== Music ===
The bride and groom entered together to Johan Helmich Roman's "Sinfonia de Chiesa". The service included several Swedish hymns. The couple proceeded back down the aisle to "Sinfonia in D major, BWV 1045" by Johann Sebastian Bach.

=== Attire ===
The bride wore a silk duchesse satin gown with a high neck, long sleeves, slim skirt and train extending from the shoulders designed by Marc Bohan for Dior. The seamstresses who worked on the dress were not told at the time they were working on the future Queen of Sweden's dress. Sommerlath wore a lace veil that had belonged to Queen Sofia and was worn by the King's mother and sisters on their wedding days. The gown was deliberately left simple to highlight the heirloom veil. The veil was anchored by the Cameo Tiara, which had belonged to Empress Joséphine and was worn by the King's sisters, Princess Birgitta and Princess Désirée, on their wedding days in 1961 and 1964, respectively. Her train had also previously been own by Princesses Birgitta and Désirée. The bride's mother discreetly placed a handkerchief around her daughter's wrist with a rubber band, this is visible in some photos.

The groom wore the uniform of an Admiral in the Swedish Royal Navy with the insignia of the Order of the Seraphim, Order of the Sword, Order of the Polar Star, Order of Vasa and the Order of Merit of the Federal Republic of Germany.

=== Attendants ===
The couple had six child attendants: Prince Hubertus of Hohenzollern, son of the groom's sister, Princess Birgitta; Master James Ambler, son of the groom's sister, Princess Margaretha; Baroness Hélène Silfverschiöld, daughter of the groom's sister, Princess Désirée; Miss Carmita Sommerlath, daughter of the bride's brother, Ralf Sommerlath; Miss Sophie Sommerlath, daughter of the bride's brother, Walther Sommerlath; and Miss Amelie Middelschulte, daughter of the bride's friend, Beate Middelschulte.

== Guests ==
=== Relatives of the groom ===
- Princess Margaretha, Mrs Ambler, and Mr John Ambler, the groom's sister and brother-in-law
  - Miss Sybilla Ambler, the groom's niece
  - Master Edward Ambler, the groom's nephew
  - Master James Ambler, the groom's nephew
- Princess Birgitta and Prince Johann Georg of Hohenzollern, the groom's sister and brother-in-law
  - Prince Carl Christian of Hohenzollern, the groom's nephew
  - Princess Désirée of Hohenzollern, the groom's niece
  - Prince Hubertus of Hohenzollern, the groom's nephew
- Princess Désirée, Baroness Silfverschiöld, and Baron Niclas Silfverschiöld, the groom's sister and brother-in-law
  - Baron Carl Silfverschiöld, the groom's nephew
  - Baroness Christina-Louise Silfverschiöld, the groom's niece
  - Baroness Hélène Silfverschiöld, the groom's niece
- Princess Christina, Mrs Magnuson, and Mr Tord Magnuson, the groom's sister and brother-in-law
- Count Sigvard and Countess Marianne Bernadotte of Wisborg, the groom's paternal uncle and aunt
  - Count Michael Bernadotte of Wisborg, the groom's first cousin
- Queen Ingrid of Denmark, the groom's paternal aunt
  - The Queen and Prince Henrik of Denmark, the groom's first cousin and her husband
  - The Princess and Prince of Sayn-Wittgenstein-Berleburg, the groom's first cousin and her husband
  - Queen Anne-Marie and King Constantine II of the Hellenes, the groom's first cousin and third cousin
- The Duke of Halland and Mrs Lilian Davies, the groom's paternal uncle and his partner
- Count Carl Johan and Countess Kerstin Bernadotte of Wisborg, the groom's paternal uncle and aunt
- Princess Axel of Denmark, the groom's first cousin twice removed

=== Relatives of the bride ===
- Mr Walther and Mrs Alice Sommerlath, the bride's parents
  - Mr and Mrs Ralf Sommerlath, the bride's brother and sister-in-law
    - Miss Carmita Sommerlath, the bride's niece
  - Mr and Mrs Walther Ludwig Sommerlath, the bride's brother and sister-in-law
    - Miss Sophie Sommerlath, the bride's niece
  - Mr Jörg Sommerlath, the bride's brother
- The Rev. Dr Ernst Sommerlath, the bride's paternal uncle

=== Foreign royal guests ===
- (Belgium) The King and Queen of the Belgians, the groom's second cousin once removed, and his wife
- Tsar Simeon II and Tsarista Margarita of Bulgaria, the groom's fourth cousin once removed and his wife
- The Grand Duke and Grand Duchess of Luxembourg, the groom's second cousin once removed and her husband
- Princess Beatrix and Prince Claus of the Netherlands, the groom's third cousin and her husband (representing the Queen of the Netherlands)
- The King of Norway, the groom's second cousin once removed
  - The Crown Prince and Crown Princess of Norway, the groom's second cousin once removed and his wife
- The Duke and Duchess of Cádiz, the groom's third cousin and his wife (representing the King of Spain)
- The Duke and Duchess of Gloucester, the groom's third cousin and his wife (representing the Queen of the United Kingdom)
- (United Kingdom) The Earl Mountbatten of Burma, the groom's paternal step-granduncle (and second cousin once removed)
- (United Kingdom) Captain Alexander Ramsay of Mar and Mistress of Saltoun, the groom's first cousin once removed and his wife

=== Other heads of state ===
- Urho Kekkonen, President of the Republic of Finland
- (West Germany) Walter Scheel, Federal President of the Federal Republic of Germany, and Mrs Scheel
- Kristján Eldjárn, President of Iceland, and Mrs Eldjárn

== Aftermath ==
Upon marriage, Sommerlath immediately became queen consort of Sweden, the first since the death of Louise Mountbatten, her husband's step-grandmother, eleven years earlier. The couple drove through Stockholm in an open landau before returning to the Royal Palace for a luncheon reception for 300 guests. The newlyweds appeared on the balcony where they were serenaded by 200 folk musicians from Dalarna. An estimated 200,000 people lined the streets of Stockholm.

The couple honeymooned in Hawaii, Botswana and finally at Solliden Palace in Öland. The wedding boosted the popularity of the Monarchy as the public saw the bachelor King settling down.

The couple has three children, Victoria (b. 1977), Carl Philip (b. 1979) and Madeleine (b. 1982), and nine grandchildren. In 2010, their daughter, Victoria, married Daniel Westling on the same date in the same Cathedral, becoming the fourth Swedish royal couple to marry on 19 June.
