= Imperial County of Ortenburg =

German polity

Imperial County of Ortenburg Reichsgrafschaft Ortenburg (German)
- 1120–1805
- Coat of arms
- Status: State of the Holy Roman Empire
- Capital: Ortenburg
- Government: Monarchy
- Historical era: Middle Ages
  - First mention of Ortenburg Castle: 1120
  - Rapoto II Count Palatine of Bavaria: 1209
  - Reichsfreiheit confirmed: 1473
  - Joined Bavarian Circle: 1500
  - Turned Protestant under Count Joachim: 1563
  - Disestablished: 1805
- Currency: Ortenburg Thaler
Preceded by	Succeeded by
Duchy of Bavaria	Kingdom of Bavaria

Coat of arms of the Imperial Counts of Ortenburg (18th century)

The Imperial County of Ortenburg was a state of the Holy Roman Empire in present-day Lower Bavaria, Germany. It was located on the lands around Ortenburg Castle, about 10 km (6 mi) west of Passau. Though the Counts of Ortenburg—formerly Ortenberg—emerged in the 12th century as a cadet branch of the Rhenish House of Sponheim (Spanheim) who then ruled over the Duchy of Carinthia, an affiliation with the Carinthian Ortenburger comital family is unverifiable.

== History ==
The first Count Rapoto I of Ortenburg was mentioned about 1134. Born at Kraiburg, the fourth son of Duke Engelbert II of Carinthia, he retained several Bavarian territories held by the Spanheimer family, while his elder brothers Ulric and Engelbert III succeeded their father in Carinthia and Istria. Rapoto had the Ortenburg Castle erected about 1120 whereafter he began to call himself a Graf von Ortenberg. When his brother Engelbert III died without heirs in 1173 he could unite a significant number of territories under his rule and confirmed his independence when the Bavarian ducal title passed to the House of Wittelsbach in 1180. After Otto VIII of Wittelsbach had assassinated the German king Philip of Swabia in 1208, Rapoto's son Count Rapoto II even held the office of a Count Palatine of Bavaria.

Rapoto's II descendants, however, soon entered into fierce conflicts with the neighbouring Bishops of Passau and also with the mighty Austrian House of Babenberg. Upon the death of Count Rapoto III in 1248, his territories as well as the office of the Count Palatine again passed to the Wittelsbachs. The Ortenburg territory was further diminished by an ongoing inheritance conflict between Rapoto's III nephew Henry II and his brothers, of which the surviving Count Rapoto IV in 1275 could only retain the lands around Ortenburg Castle.

Upon the death of Count Henry IV of Ortenburg in 1395, the county was partitioned into Ortenburg-Altortenburg, Ortenburg-Neuortenburg and Ortenburg-Dorfbach. The Neuortenburg branch again inherited the Altortenburg county in 1444 following the death of Etzel I and Dorfbach county in 1462 following the death of Count Alram II. Meanwhile, the county had fallen under the influence of the Wittelsbach Bavaria-Landshut duchy, and also sided with Duke Albert IV of Bavaria-Munich in the 1503 Landshut War of Succession. Since the dynasty of the Counts of Celje had become extinct with the death of Count Ulrich II in 1456, the Ortenburg counts had claimed the Carinthian Grafschaft Ortenburg, but failed to prove any kinship apart from the name similarity.

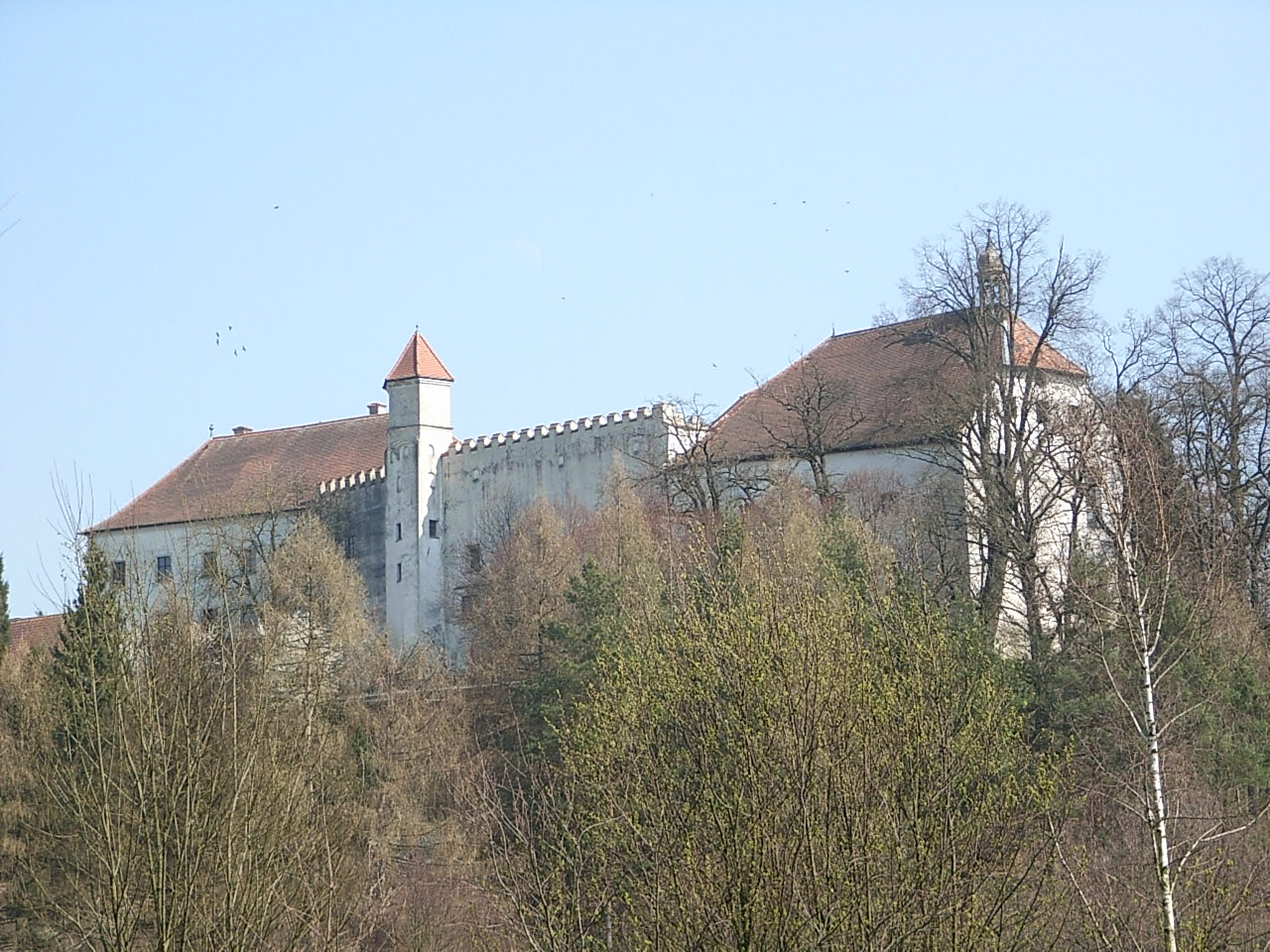
Ortenburg Castle, Bavaria, ancestral seat of Imperial Counts of Ortenburg

Under Count Joachim of Ortenburg-Neuortenburg, the state turned to Protestantism in 1563, fiercely opposed by Duke Albert V of Bavaria challenging Ortenburg's Imperial immediacy which, however, was confirmed by the Imperial Chamber Court in 1573. The county remained a Lutheran enclave within the mainly Catholic Bavarian lands and became a refuge for expellees during the Thirty Years' War.

Though deeply in debt after numerous lawsuits against the Wittelsbach dukes, Ortenburg-Neuortenburg retained its independence until in 1805 Count Joseph Charles Leopold finally sold it to Elector Maximilian I Joseph of Bavaria. The county was incorporated into the newly established Kingdom of Bavaria in the course of the Empire's dissolution in 1806.

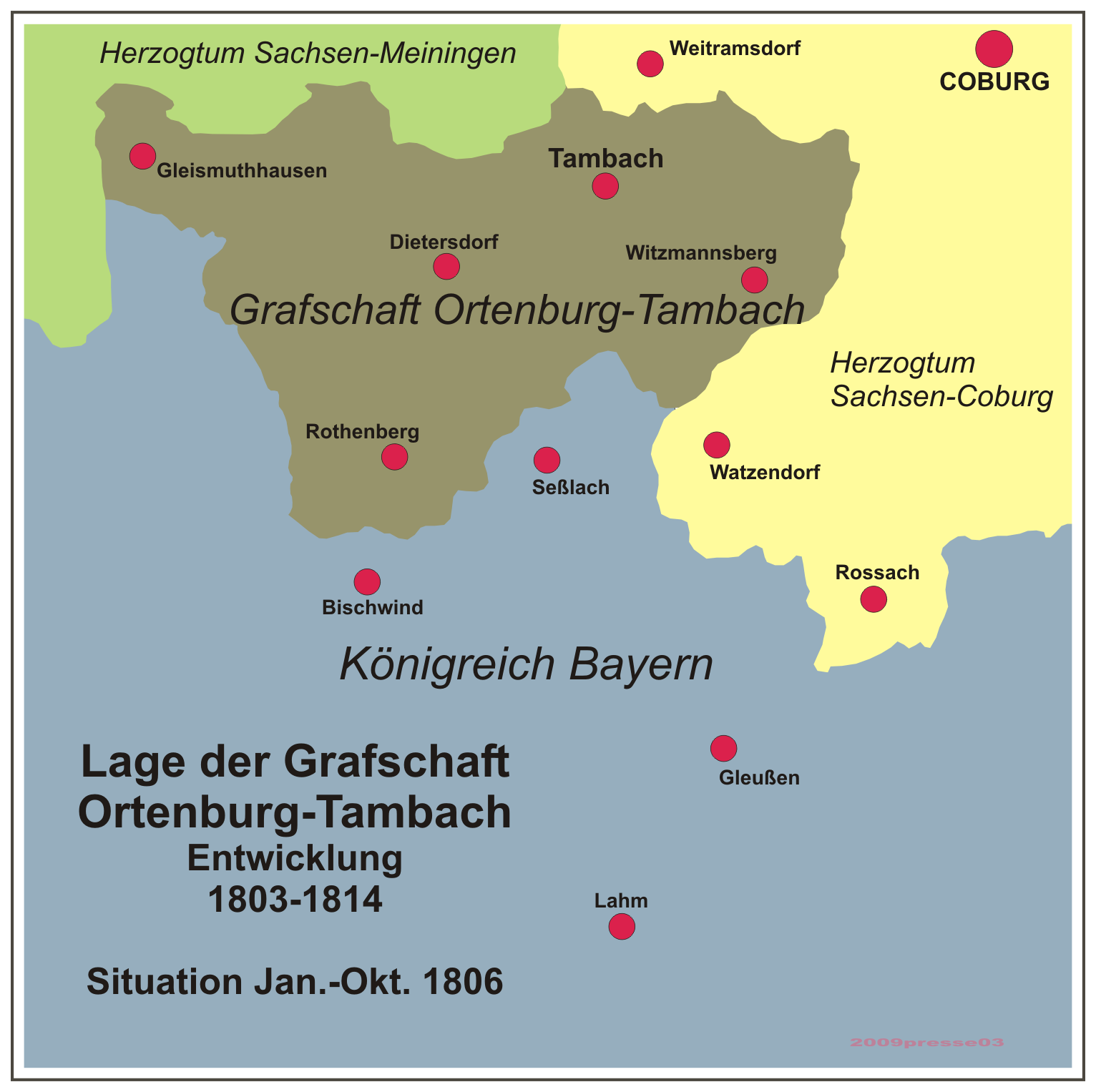
Ortenburg-Tambach (Jan.–Oct. 1806)

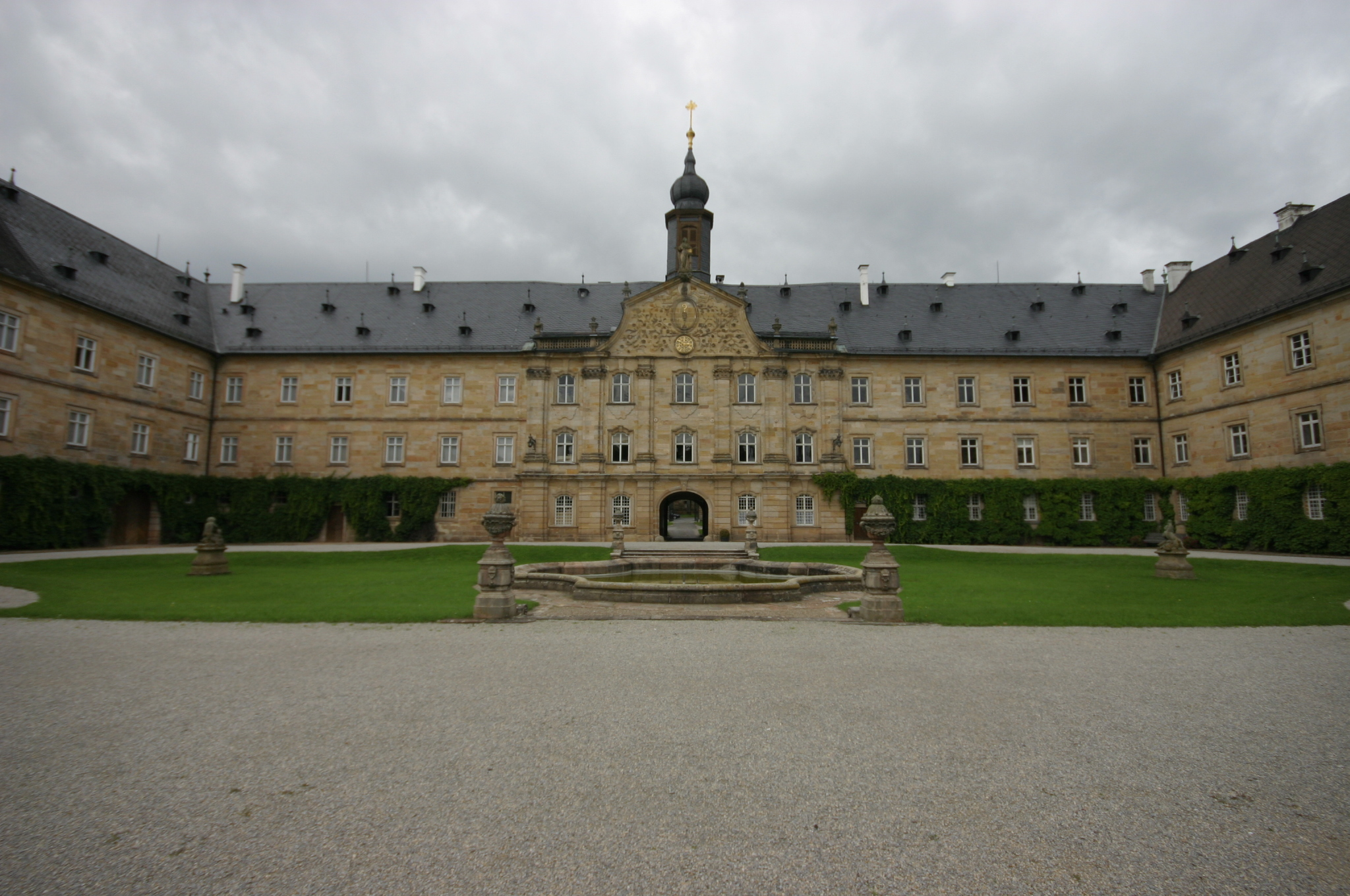
Tambach Castle, Franconia, current residence of Ortenburg family

In exchange for his county, the count received the former monastery of Tambach (today part of Weitramsdorf) in Franconia in 1806, which was elevated to the status of Imperial County of Ortenburg-Tambach (situated between Bavaria and the Duchies of Saxe-Meiningen and Saxe-Coburg), but shortly later became part of the Grand Duchy of Würzburg by mediatisation, and in 1814 fell to the Kingdom of Bavaria. Since then the counts of Ortenburg belong to the Mediatized Houses. In 1827 count Joseph Carl bought his family's ancestral seat, Ortenburg Castle, back from the Bavarian Crown. Count Alram (1925–2007), however, who converted to the Roman Catholic Church, sold it in 1971. His son, count Heinrich (b. 1956), the former husband of Princess Désirée of Hohenzollern (b. 1963), daughter of Princess Birgitta of Sweden and Prince Johann Georg of Hohenzollern, owns Tambach Castle (the former monastery), an adjoining Wild Park and its vast estate to this day. The pair had three children:

- Hereditary Count Carl-Theodor zu Ortenburg (b. 1992)
- Count Friedrich-Hubertus (b. 1995)
- Countess Carolina (b. 1997)

== Counts of Ortenburg ==
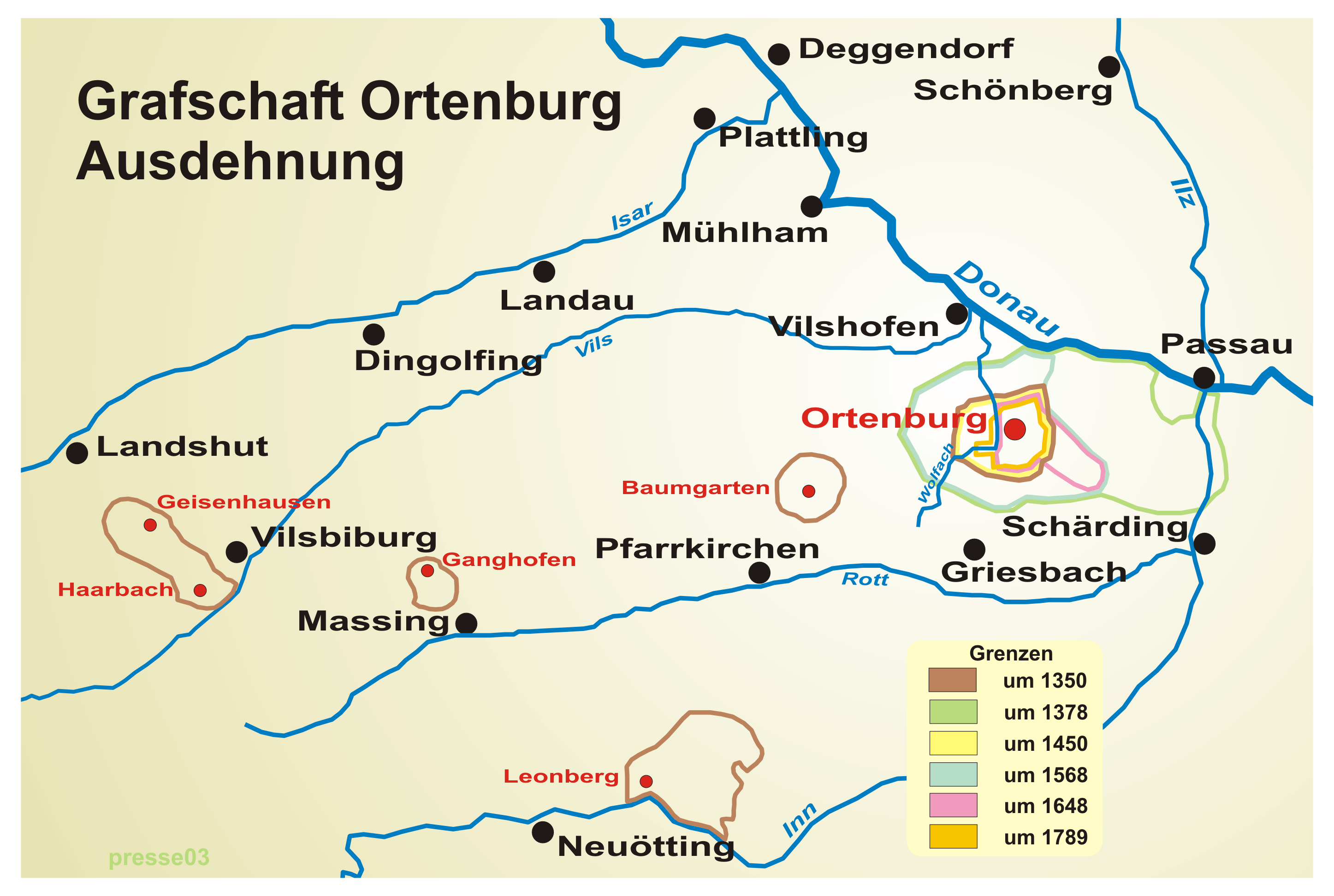
Ortenburg territories from 1350 until 1789

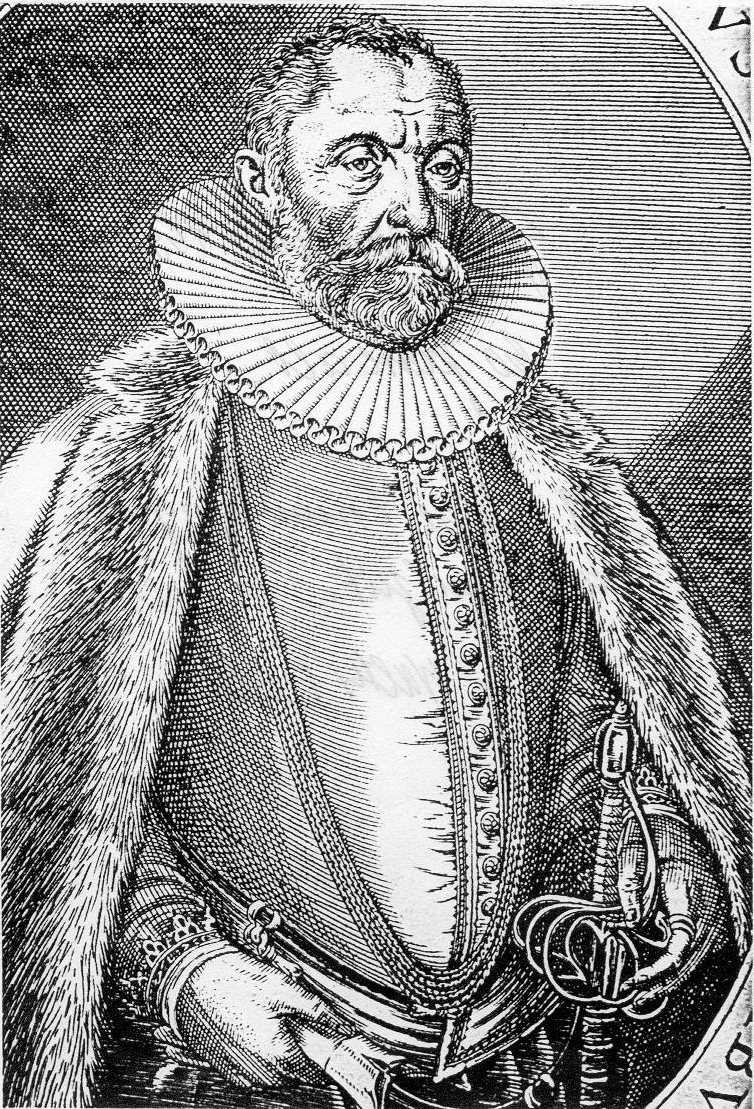
Count Joachim (1530–1600)

- Rapoto I (1134–1186), also Count of Murach from 1163 and Count of Kraiburg from 1173 on
- Rapoto II (1186–1231), son, Count of Kraiburg and Count Palatine of Bavaria from 1209 on, jointly with his brother
  - Henry I (1186–1241), also Count of Murach 1186–1238
- Rapoto III (1231–1248), son of Rapoto II, Count of Kraiburg, also Count Palatine of Bavaria, died without male heirs
- Henry II (1241–1257), son of Henry I
  - Gebhard (1238–1275), brother, Count of Murach 1238–1272, Imperial Count of Ortenburg 1257–1275, and
  - Diepold (1238–1272), Count of Murach 1238–1272
  - Rapoto IV (1275–1296), brother, Count of Murach 1238–1272, Imperial Count of Ortenburg 1275–1296
- Henry III (1297/1321 – 1345), son of Rapoto IV
- Henry IV (1346–1395), son of Henry III
- George I (1395–1422), son of Henry IV, Count of Ortenburg-Neuortenburg 1395–1422, Imperial Count of Ortenburg 1395–1422
  - Henry V (1422–1449), Count of Ortenburg-Neuortenburg
- Etzel I (1395–1444), son of Henry IV, Count of Ortenburg-Altortenburg 1395–1444, Imperial Count of Ortenburg 1422–1444
- Alram I (1395–1411), son of Henry IV, Count of Ortenburg-Dorfbach
  - Alram II (1411–1460), son of Alram I, Count of Ortenburg-Dorfbach 1411–1460, Imperial Count of Ortenburg 1444–1460
- George II (1461–1488), son of Henry V, Count of Ortenburg-Neuortenburg 1449–1488, Imperial Count of Ortenburg 1461–1488
- Sebastian I (1488–1490), brother, Imperial Count of Ortenburg 1488–1490
- Wolfgang (1490–1519), son of George II
- Ulrich II (1519–1524), son of Sebastian I
- Christoph (1524–1551), brother
- Joachim (1551–1600), son of Christoph
- Henry VII (1600–1603), cousin, great-grandson of Ulrich II,
- George IV (1603–1627), cousin, great-grandson of Ulrich II
- Frederick Casimir (1627–1658), son of Henry VII
- George Reinhard (1658–1666), son of George IV
- Christian (1666–1684), brother
- George Philip (1684–1702), son of George Reinhard
- John George (1702–1725), son of George Philip
- Charles III (1725–1776), son of John George
- Charles Albert (1776–1787), son of Charles III
- Joseph Charles Leopold (1787–1805), son of Charles Albert

=== After German Mediatization ===
- Joseph Karl Leopold (Joseph Charles Leopold), 31st Count 1787–1831 (1780–1831)
  - Franz Karl, 32nd Count 1831–1876 (1801–1876)
    - Friedrich, 33rd Count 1876–1894 (1841–1894)
      - Franz Carl, 34th Count 1894–1936 (1875–1936)
        - Alram, 35th Count 1936–2007 (1925–2007)
          - Heinrich, 36th Count 2007–present (b. 1956)
            - Carl-Theodor, Hereditary Count (b. 1992)
            - Count Frederik (b. 1995)
          - Count Karl (b. 1960)
            - Count Victor (b. 2005)
            - Count Julius (b. 2007)

== Sources ==
- (in German) Hausmann, Friedrich : Die Grafen zu Ortenburg und ihre Vorfahren im Mannesstamm, die Spanheimer in Kärnten, Sachsen und Bayern, sowie deren Nebenlinien, erschienen in: Ostbairische Grenzmarken - Passauer Jahrbuch für Geschichte Kunst und Volkskunde, Nr. 36, Passau / 1994
- (in German) Ortenburg-Tambach, Eberhard Count of: Geschichte des reichsständischen, herzoglichen und gräflichen Gesamthauses Ortenburg - Teil 2: Das gräfliche Haus in Bayern., Vilshofen / 1932
