= Prince Johann Georg of Hohenzollern =

German prince

Prince Johann Georg
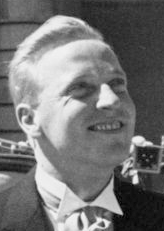
- Johann Georg in 1961
- Born: 31 July 1932; Schloss Sigmaringen, Sigmaringen, Province of Hohenzollern, Germany
- Died: 2 March 2016 (aged 83); Munich, Germany
- Burial: 12 March 2016; Erlöserkirche, Sigmaringen, Baden-Württemberg, Germany
- Spouse: Princess Birgitta of Sweden (m. 1961)
- Issue: Prince Carl Christian; Princess Désirée; Prince Hubertus
Names
- German: Johann Georg Carl Leopold Eitel-Friedrich Meinrad Maria Hubertus Michael
- House: Hohenzollern-Sigmaringen
- Father: Frederick, Prince of Hohenzollern
- Mother: Princess Margarete Karola of Saxony

Prince Johann Georg of Hohenzollern (Johann Georg Carl Leopold Eitel-Friedrich Meinrad Maria Hubertus Michael; 31 July 1932 – 2 March 2016) was the brother-in-law of King Carl XVI Gustaf of Sweden through his marriage to Princess Birgitta of Sweden.

Prince Johann Georg was the sixth child of Frederick, Prince of Hohenzollern, and Princess Margarete Karola of Saxony.

== Early life ==
The House of Hohenzollern also produced rulers of the Kingdom of Romania. King Carol I of Romania was the first king of Romania born as a Prince of Hohenzollern-Sigmaringen. He was followed by his nephew Ferdinand I of Romania (1865–1927), who was adopted as heir in 1889 by his uncle and succeeded as King in 1914 upon his uncle's death. Ferdinand became the father of King Carol II of Romania and grandfather of Michael I of Romania (1921–2017), the last reigning member of the Royal Family of Romania.

Johann Georg, known as "Hansi", had six siblings: Benedikta (who married Heinrich count of Waldburg zu Wolfegg und Waldsee); Maria Aldegunde (who married Werner Hess); Maria Theresia; Friedrich Wilhelm, Prince of Hohenzollern (who married Princess Margarita of Leiningen); Franz Joseph (who married Princess Maria Ferdinande von Thurn und Taxis and second Princess Diane of Bourbon-Parma); and Prince Ferfried (who married Maja Meinert).

== Career ==
Johann Georg lived in Grünwald, Munich and was a fine art expert. From 1992 to 1998 he served as Director General of the Bavarian State Picture Collection and was also a director of the Hypo-Kunsthalle of the Hypo Cultural Foundation.

He served as a Member of Advisory Board - Europe at Christie's International plc.

A patron of the arts, his 75th birthday was celebrated with a special concert in Munich.

== Personal life ==
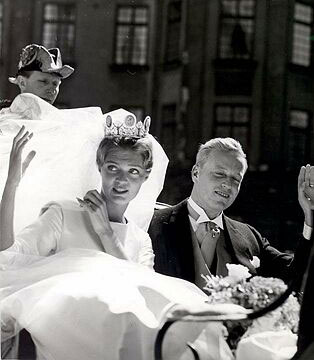
Wedding day of Princess Birgitta of Sweden and Prince Johann Georg of Hohenzollern in Stockholm.

Johann Georg met Princess Birgitta of Sweden, the sister of the current King of Sweden Carl XVI Gustaf, in 1959 at a cocktail party while visiting friends and relatives in Germany. Their engagement was announced by the Royal Palace of Stockholm on 15 December 1960. The civil marriage ceremony took place at the Royal Palace of Stockholm on 25 May 1961, and the religious wedding in the Sankt Johann Church at the bridegroom's family palace of Sigmaringen on 30 May/31 July 1961. Together, they were the parents of three children:

- Prince Carl Christian Friedrich Johannes Meinrad Maria Hubertus Edmund of Hohenzollern (born 5 April 1962 in Munich, Germany), married Nicole Helene Neschitsch (born 22 January 1968 in Munich) on 26 July 1999 in Kreuzpullach. They have one son:
  - Prince Nicolas Johann Georg Maria of Hohenzollern (born 22 November 1999)
- Princess Désirée Margareta Victoria Louise Sibylla Katharina Maria of Hohenzollern (born 27 November 1963 in Munich). She married Heinrich Franz Josef Georg Maria Reichsgraf (Imperial Count) zu Ortenburg (born 11 October 1956 in Bamberg) on 21 September 1998 in Weitramsdorf. They had three children before divorcing in 2002. Then she married Eckbert Georg Klaus von Bohlen und Halbach (born 24 March 1956)
  - Hereditary Count Carl-Theodor Georg Philipp Maria zu Ortenburg (born 21 February 1992 in Lichtenfels)
  - Count Frederik-Hubertus Ferdinand Maria zu Ortenburg (born 7 February 1995 in Lichtenfels)
  - Countess Carolina Maria Franziska Christina Stephanie zu Ortenburg (born 23 March 1997)
- Prince Hubertus Gustav Adolf Veit Georg Meinrad Maria Alexander of Hohenzollern (born 10 June 1966 in Munich), who served as page boy at the 1976 wedding of his uncle, King Carl XVI Gustaf. He married Uta Maria König (born 25 February 1964 in Trier). They had two children:
  - Prince Lennart Carl Christian of Hohenzollern (10 January 2001 – 14 January 2001)
  - Princess Vivianne of Hohenzollern (born May 2009)

Johann Georg and Birgitta separated in 1990, though they remained legally married and attended Swedish royal family events together, including the 2010 wedding of Crown Princess Victoria. They celebrated their golden wedding in 2011.

Prince Johann Georg died on 2 March 2016 in Munich.

=== Descendants ===
Through his eldest son, he was a grandfather of Nicolas Johann Georg Maria, Prince of Hohenzollern (b. 1999). Through his daughter Désirée's first marriage, he was a grandfather of Carl Theodor, Count of Ortenburg (b. 1992), Frederik-Hubertus, Count of Ortenburg (b. 1995), and Carolina, Countess of Ortenburg (b. 1997).

== Honours ==
Coat of arms as Knight of the Seraphim

=== Dynastic ===
- (Hohenzollern-Sigmaringen) House of Hohenzollern: Knight Grand Cross with Chain of the Princely House Order of Hohenzollern

=== National ===
- Germany: Officer of the Order of Merit of the Federal Republic of Germany
  - Bavaria: Member of the Decoration of Merit

=== Foreign ===
- France: Commander of the Order of Arts and Letters, 1st Class
- Italy
  - (Kingdom of the Two Sicilies) Castroan Royal Family of Two Sicilies: Knight Grand Cross of Justice of the Two Sicilian Sacred Military Constantinian Order of Saint George
- Sweden: Knight of the Royal Order of the Seraphim
- Sweden: Recipient of the Wedding Medal of Crown Princess Victoria to Daniel Westling

== Ancestry ==
Ancestors of Prince Johann Georg of Hohenzollern

8. Leopold, Prince of Hohenzollern
4. William, Prince of Hohenzollern
9. Infanta Antónia of Portugal
2. Frederick, Prince of Hohenzollern
10. Prince Louis, Count of Trani
5. Princess Maria Teresa of Bourbon-Two Sicilies
11. Duchess Mathilde Ludovika in Bavaria
1. Prince Johann Georg of Hohenzollern
12. George of Saxony
6. Frederick Augustus III of Saxony
13. Maria Anna of Portugal
3. Princess Margarete Karola of Saxony
14. Ferdinand IV, Grand Duke of Tuscany
7. Archduchess Luise of Austria, Princess of Tuscany
15. Alice of Bourbon-Parma
