= Prince Ferfried of Hohenzollern =

German nobleman and racing driver (1943–2022)

Ferfried von Hohenzollern
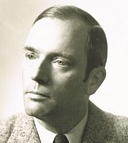
- Ferfried in 1975
- Born: 14 April 1943; Umkirch Palace, Baden, Germany
- Died: 26 September 2022 (aged 79); Munich, Bavaria, Germany
- Spouse: Angela von Morgen (m. 1968; div. 1973) Eliane Etter (m. 1977; div. 1987) Maja Synke Meinert (m. 1999; div. 2007)
- Issue: Valerie-Alexandra; Stefanie Michaela; Henriette Annabelle; Moritz Johannes
Names
- German: Ferfried Maximilian Pius Meinrad Maria Hubert Michael Justinus Prinz von Hohenzollern
- House: Hohenzollern-Sigmaringen; Hohenzollern
- Father: Frederick, Prince of Hohenzollern
- Mother: Princess Margarete Karola of Saxony

Ferfried Maximilian Pius Meinrad Maria Hubert Michael Justinus Prinz von Hohenzollern (14 April 1943 – 26 September 2022) was a member of the princely House of Hohenzollern-Sigmaringen and champion race car driver. He was also known as the "black sheep" of Hohenzollern after several divorces and alcoholism including binge drinking scandals.

== Early life ==
Ferfried was the youngest child and fourth son of Frederick, Prince of Hohenzollern and his wife Margarete Karola, daughter of the last Saxon king, Frederick Augustus III. The Swabian Hohenzollerns were elevated to princes in 1623 and ruled until 1849. Pope Pius XII was Ferfried's godfather.

== Career ==
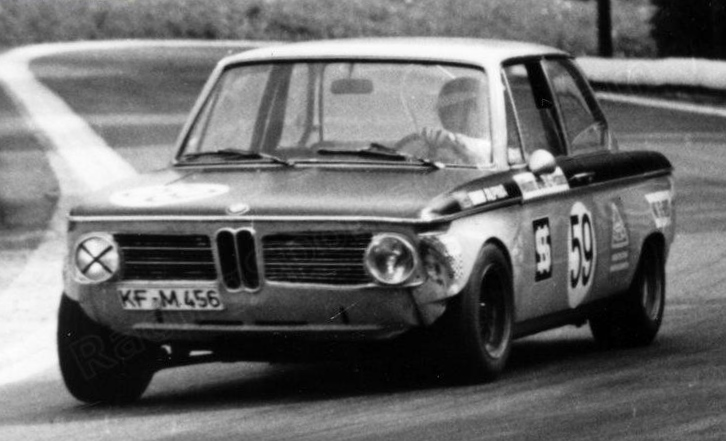
Ferfried of Hohenzollern in Brno, Czech Republic in May 1969

In 1971, Ferfried won the second 24-hour race at Nürburgring in Germany with a BMW 1600 Alpina. After 36 years of absence from active racing, he raced again for the private racing team Racing Strip.com live in 2007, again in a BMW.

== Marriages and children ==
His first marriage, on 21 September 1968, was to Angela von Morgen (11 November 1942 – 11 January 2019), daughter of Ernst von Morgen and Margarethe von Schlitz gen. von Görtz. They were divorced in 1973, having had two daughters:

- Valerie Alexandra Henriette Margarethe (born 10 April 1969)
- Stefanie Michaela Sigrid Birgitta (born 8 May 1971), who married on 30 October 2009 Martin Haag

His second marriage, on 7 April 1977, was to Eliane Etter (born 4 May 1947), daughter of Dr. Hans Etter and Irmgard Zosso. They were divorced in 1987, having had two children:

- Henriette Annabelle Gabriele Adrienne (born 26 March 1978)
- Moritz Johannes Axel Peter Meinrad (born 5 May 1980)

In 1999 he married Maja Synke Meinert (born 8 October 1971). They were divorced in early March 2007.

== In the media ==
Beginning 8 May 2006, the reality programme Tatjana & Foffi – Aschenputtel wird Prinzessin ("Cinderella Becomes A Princess") was broadcast on television, focusing on the relationship of Ferfried "Foffi" Hohenzollern and the TV celebrity Tatjana Gsell. He appeared on TV Gusto's Royal Dinner, co-hosting alongside Birte Karalus.

== Auto racing results ==
=== 1968 ===
- 24 March 1968, 4 h Monza (Italy; Div.2+3), Porsche 911, 2nd
- 25 April 1968, 1000 km Monza, Porsche 911 T, DNF
- 16 June 1968, Hockenheim Grand Touring (Germany), Porsche 911 T, 1st
- 23 June 1968, Deutsche-Automobil-Rundstrecken-Meisterschaft Mainz-Finthen (Germany), Porsche 911 T, 1st
- 7 July 1968, 6 h Nürburgring (Germany), Porsche 911, DNF
- 21 July 1968, Solituderennen Hockenheim (Germany; GT+TS), Porsche 911 T, 1st
- 18 August 1968, Grand Prix Brno (Czechoslovakia), Porsche 911, 3rd
- 8 September 1968, Deutsche-Automobil-Rundstrecken-Meisterschaft Ulm-Laupheim, Porsche 911 T, 3rd
- 1 December 1968, Hockenheim Finale, Porsche 911 T

=== 1969 ===
- 13 April 1969, ETCC Aspern (Div.1+2), BMW 1600
- 20 April 1969, 1 h Belgrade (Div.2+3), BMW 1600, 7th
- 25 April 1969, 1000 km Monza, Porsche 911 T, DNF
- 4 May 1969, Targa Florio, Porsche 911 T, 48th
- 4 May 1969, Targa Florio, Porsche 911 S, T-car
- 11 May 1969, 2 h Budapest (Hungary), BMW 1600
- 25 May 1969, GP Brno, BMW 1600, 3rd
- 25 May 1969, GP Brno, BMW 1600
- 1 June 1969, 1000 km Nürburgring, Porsche 911 T, DNF
- 22 June 1969, 6 h Brands Hatch, BMW 1600, DNS
- 6 July 1969, 6 h Nürburgring, BMW 1600, 4th
- 27 July 1969, 24 h Spa, BMW 1600, DNA
- 27 July 1969, 24 h Spa, BMW 1600, DNF
- 10 August 1969, 1000 km Zeltweg, Porsche 910, 14th
- 31 August 1969, ETCC Zandvoort (Div.2), BMW 1600, 4th
- 28 September 1969, 3 h Jarama, BMW 1600, 5th
- 12 October 1969, 1000 km Paris (France), Porsche 910, 7th
- 19 October 1969, Hessenpreis Hockenheim (GT+1.6), Porsche 911 T, 7th
- 1969, Tourenwagen-Europameisterschaft Division 2, BMW 1600, 3rd

=== 1970 ===
- 15 March 1970, 4 h Monza (Div.2+3), BMW 1600, DNF
- 24 May 1970, GP Brno, BMW 1602, DNF
- 14 June 1970, DARM Hockenheim (GT+1.3), Porsche, DNA
- 5 July 1970, Hockenheim (GT+1.6/T+2.0), Porsche 911 T, 12th
- 12 July 1970, GP Nürburgring, BMW 1602, DNF
- 26 July 1970, 24 h Spa, BMW 1600, DNF
- 27 September 1970, 4 h Jarama, BMW 1600, DNF
- 11 October 1970, 1000 km Zeltweg, Porsche 914, 12th

=== 1971 ===
- 14 March 1971, 4 h Monza, BMW 2002, 6th
- 11 April 1971, ETCC Salzburgring (Div.2), BMW 2002, DNF
- 16 May 1971, Targa Florio, Porsche 914, 13th
- 30 May 1971, 1000 km Nürburgring, Porsche 908/02, DNS
- 27 June 1971, 24 h Nürburgring (Nordschleife), BMW 2002, 1st
- 25 July 1971, 24 h Spa, BMW 2002, DNA
- 11 September 1971, 12 h Paul Ricard, BMW 2002, DNF

=== 2007 ===
- 10 June 2007, 24 h Nürburgring, BMW M3 Compact

== Ancestry ==
Ancestors of Prince Ferfried of Hohenzollern

8. Leopold, Prince of Hohenzollern
4. William, Prince of Hohenzollern
9. Infanta Antónia of Portugal
2. Frederick, Prince of Hohenzollern
10. Prince Louis, Count of Trani
5. Princess Maria Teresa of Bourbon-Two Sicilies
11. Duchess Mathilde Ludovika in Bavaria
1. Ferfried of Hohenzollern
12. George of Saxony
6. Frederick Augustus III of Saxony
13. Maria Anna of Portugal
3. Princess Margarete Karola of Saxony
14. Ferdinand IV, Grand Duke of Tuscany
7. Archduchess Luise of Austria, Princess of Tuscany
15. Alice of Bourbon-Parma
