= Princess Birgitta of Sweden =

Swedish princess (1937–2024)

Princess Birgitta
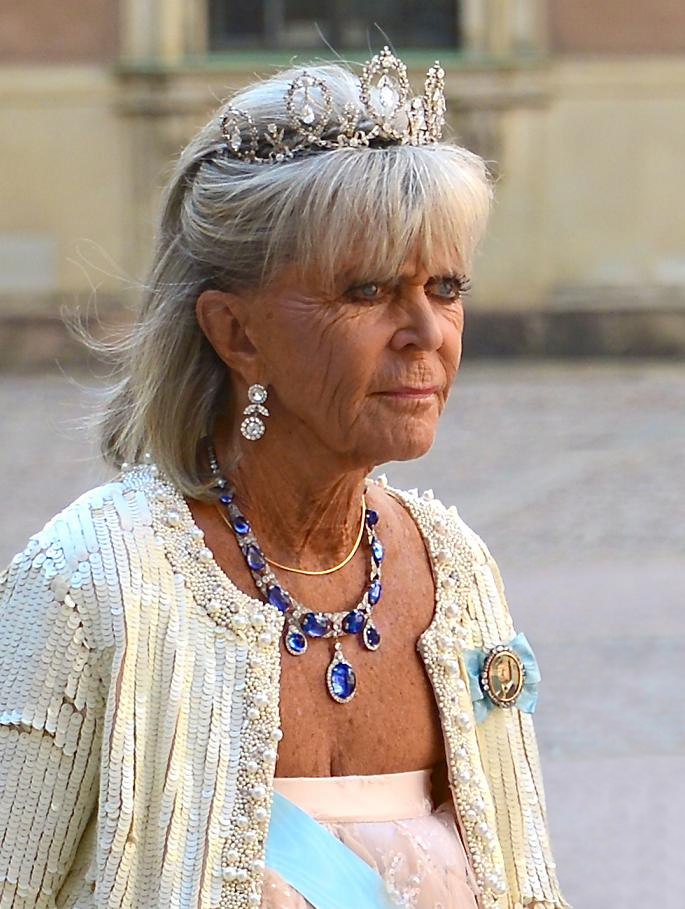
- Birgitta in 2013
- Born: 19 January 1937; Haga Palace, Solna, Sweden
- Died: 4 December 2024 (aged 87); Mallorca, Spain
- Burial: 15 December 2024; Royal Cemetery, Solna, Sweden
- Spouse: Prince Johann Georg of Hohenzollern (m. 1961; died 2016)
- Issue: Prince Carl Christian; Princess Désirée; Prince Hubertus
Names
- Birgitta Ingeborg Alice
- House: Bernadotte
- Father: Prince Gustaf Adolf, Duke of Västerbotten
- Mother: Princess Sibylla of Saxe-Coburg and Gotha

Princess Birgitta of Sweden LoK av KMO (Birgitta Ingeborg Alice; 19 January 1937 – 4 December 2024) was a member of the Swedish royal family. She was the second child of Prince Gustaf Adolf, Duke of Västerbotten, and Princess Sibylla of Saxe-Coburg and Gotha, and an elder sister of King Carl XVI Gustaf.

From 1961, she was a member of the Swabian branch of the deposed House of Hohenzollern by her marriage to Prince Johann Georg of Hohenzollern.

== Early life ==
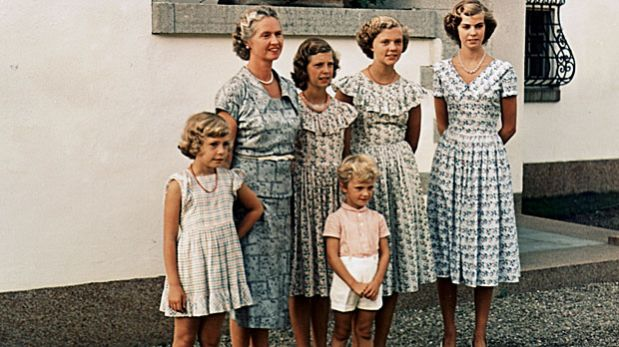
Princess Sibylla of Saxe-Coburg and Gotha and children in the 1950s. Birgitta is second from right.

Born at Haga Palace in Stockholm, Birgitta was the second child of Prince Gustaf Adolf, Duke of Västerbotten, and Princess Sibylla of Saxe-Coburg and Gotha, and a granddaughter of King Gustaf VI Adolf. She and her three sisters were affectionately called "Hagasessorna" (the Haga Princesses). She was 10 years old when her father was killed in the 1947 KLM Douglas DC-3 Copenhagen disaster.

At the age of 14, Birgitta was educated at Franska Skolan in Stockholm, followed by a stay at a Swiss boarding school. Prior to that, she and her sisters had been homeschooled at Stockholm Palace. In 1958, she graduated with a degree in movement sciences from Swedish School of Sport and Health Sciences.

== Public life ==
In the late 1950s, Birgitta trained as a gymnastics instructor and worked for almost two years at Broms school in Stockholm. She was also interested in sport, particularly fencing, tennis and later golf, and had ambitions of competing for Sweden at the Olympic Games. According to the Swedish Royal Court, she was offered the opportunity to compete in fencing for Sweden at the 1964 Summer Olympics in Tokyo, although she did not participate. In November 1960, Birgitta visited the United States accompanied by her younger sister Princess Désirée on behalf of their grandfather King Gustaf VI Adolf for the 50th anniversary of The American-Scandinavian Foundation. In their honour, a ball was organised for the two princesses at the Blackstone Hotel in Chicago by Mayor Richard Daley. After her marriage to Prince Johann Georg of Hohenzollern in 1961, Birgitta moved to Munich, where she lived with her family and continued to pursue interests in sport and fashion. During the 1980s she operated her own fashion boutique in Munich.

Birgitta continued her interest in physical fitness and in 1967 released the LP Spänsta med Birgitta, accompanied by a book containing an exercise programme. In the mid-1990s, she moved permanently to Mallorca, where golf became a central part of her life. She was an honorary board member of the British Royal Swedish Golfing Society and hosted the Princess Birgitta Trophy at Golf Santa Ponsa, the golf course near her home. Outside sport, Birgitta remained involved in charitable and international activities. She participated in the Royal Sweden Hong Kong Society, which promoted trade and projects between Sweden and Hong Kong, and she was involved in environmental issues. She also co-founded the HELP Foundation, which supports disadvantaged children around the world, and a substantial portion of the proceeds from her memoir was donated to the foundation. She additionally participated in sportsman Sven Tumba's charitable projects in Africa, which supported children through funding for schools and school transportation.

In 1997, Birgitta published her memoir Min egen väg, written in collaboration with Fred König. She later continued to make occasional public appearances connected with Sweden and the royal family. In 2009, she was the Sommar presenter on Sveriges Radio's P1, where she discussed her life, family and charitable interests. On 25 December 2022, Sveriges Television broadcast the 59-minute documentary Sessan – en kunglig saga, directed by Jens Lind, in which Birgitta looked back on her childhood at Haga Palace, her father's death, her sporting ambitions, her marriage and life abroad, and her experiences as a member of the Swedish royal family.

== Marriage ==
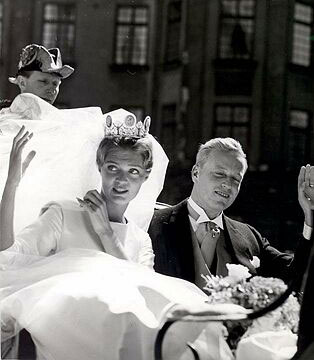
Birgitta and Johann Georg on their wedding day

In the fall of 1959, Birgitta moved to Munich, Germany, to study German. Here she met Prince Johann Georg of Hohenzollern at a cocktail party. Their engagement was announced on 15 December 1960.

The couple were married in a civil ceremony in the Hall of State of the Royal Palace of Stockholm on 25 May 1961. The bride's grandfather, King Gustaf VI Adolf, had hoped for a Lutheran ceremony, but Pope John XXIII forbade this. The bridesmaids were the bride’s sister Princess Christina and cousin Princess Benedikte of Denmark; the groomsmen were the bride's brother Crown Prince Carl Gustaf and her cousin Count Michael Bernadotte of Wisborg (son of Sigvard Bernadotte). She wore Empress Josephine's cameo diadem, thus becoming the first in a line of Swedish princesses to do so, as well as her great-grandmother Queen Sofia's lace veil which was also worn by her mother, Princess Sibylla, on her wedding day in 1932.

A Catholic ceremony was held at Sankt Johann Church at the groom's family seat of Sigmaringen, Germany, on 30 May 1961. Birgitta applied to convert to Catholicism when she married the Hohenzollern prince, but her application was rejected in wording which questioned her spiritual commitment to the change.

The couple had three children:

- Prince Carl Christian Friedrich Johannes Meinrad Maria Hubertus Edmund of Hohenzollern (born 5 April 1962 in Munich, Germany), married Nicole Helene Neschitsch (born 22 January 1968 in Munich) on 26 July 1999 in Kreuzpullach. They have one son:
  - Prince Nicolas Johann Georg Maria of Hohenzollern (born 22 November 1999)
- Princess Désirée Margareta Victoria Louise Sibylla Katharina Maria of Hohenzollern (born 27 November 1963 in Munich). She married Heinrich Franz Josef Georg Maria Reichsgraf (Imperial Count) zu Ortenburg (born 11 October 1956 in Bamberg) on 21 September 1998 in Weitramsdorf. They had three children before divorcing in 2002. Then she married Eckbert Georg Klaus von Bohlen und Halbach (born 24 March 1956)
  - Hereditary Count Carl-Theodor Georg Philipp Maria zu Ortenburg (born 21 February 1992 in Lichtenfels)
  - Count Frederik-Hubertus Ferdinand Maria zu Ortenburg (born 7 February 1995 in Lichtenfels)
  - Countess Carolina Maria Franziska Christina Stephanie zu Ortenburg (born 23 March 1997)
- Prince Hubertus Gustav Adolf Veit Georg Meinrad Maria Alexander of Hohenzollern (born 10 June 1966 in Munich), who served as page boy at the 1976 wedding of his uncle, King Carl XVI Gustaf. He married Uta Maria König (born 25 February 1964 in Trier). They had two children:
  - Prince Lennart Carl Christian of Hohenzollern (10 January 2001 – 14 January 2001)
  - Princess Vivianne of Hohenzollern (born May 2009)

Birgitta and Johann Georg separated in 1990, although they remained married. She moved to the island of Mallorca in Spain in the 1990s, while her husband continued to live in Munich until his death in 2016.

The Princess and her children were passed over for succession to the Swedish throne when subsequent absolute primogeniture was established in Sweden in 1979 and 1980, and then only included her brother's descendants and her uncle Prince Bertil. However, as the only one of her sisters to marry a man of princely status, Princess Birgitta retained her Swedish style of Royal Highness.

== Illness and death ==
In the years before her death, Birgitta experienced several health problems. In early 2020, she was hospitalized on Mallorca because of heart problems and later said that doctors had to restart her heart; she subsequently reported feeling well. In late 2024, she suffered a serious fall and was hospitalized with injuries including a head injury, fractures to her arm and an injury to her back. According to her close friend Alexandra Charles, Birgitta's condition subsequently deteriorated and she became increasingly weak before her heart failed.

On 4 December 2024, the Swedish Royal Court announced that Princess Birgitta had died earlier that day in Mallorca, Spain, at the age of 87. The court did not publicly state a specific medical cause of death. A private funeral was held on 15 December 2024 in the palace church at Drottningholm Palace. She was buried in the Royal Cemetery in Hagaparken. She left three children and five grandchildren.

As Princess Birgitta was a member of the Order of the Seraphim, the Seraphim toll at Riddarholmen Church was rung on the day of her funeral.

== Honours and arms ==
=== Honours ===
- Sweden: 22 March 1952: Member of the Royal Order of the Seraphim (LoK av KMO)

=== Arms ===
Arms of Princess Birgitta of Sweden (1937–1961)

Arms of Princess Birgitta of Hohenzollern and Sweden (1961–2024)

== Ancestry ==
Ancestors of Princess Birgitta of Sweden

8. Gustaf V of Sweden
4. Gustaf VI Adolf of Sweden
9. Princess Victoria of Baden
2. Prince Gustaf Adolf, Duke of Västerbotten
10. Prince Arthur, Duke of Connaught and Strathearn
5. Princess Margaret of Connaught
11. Princess Louise Margaret of Prussia
1. Princess Birgitta of Sweden
12. Prince Leopold, Duke of Albany
6. Charles Edward, Duke of Saxe-Coburg and Gotha
13. Princess Helena of Waldeck and Pyrmont
3. Princess Sibylla of Saxe-Coburg and Gotha
14. Friedrich Ferdinand, Duke of Schleswig-Holstein
7. Princess Victoria Adelaide of Schleswig-Holstein-Sonderburg-Glücksburg
15. Princess Karoline Mathilde of Schleswig-Holstein-Sonderburg-Augustenburg
