= Umkirch =

- Municipality
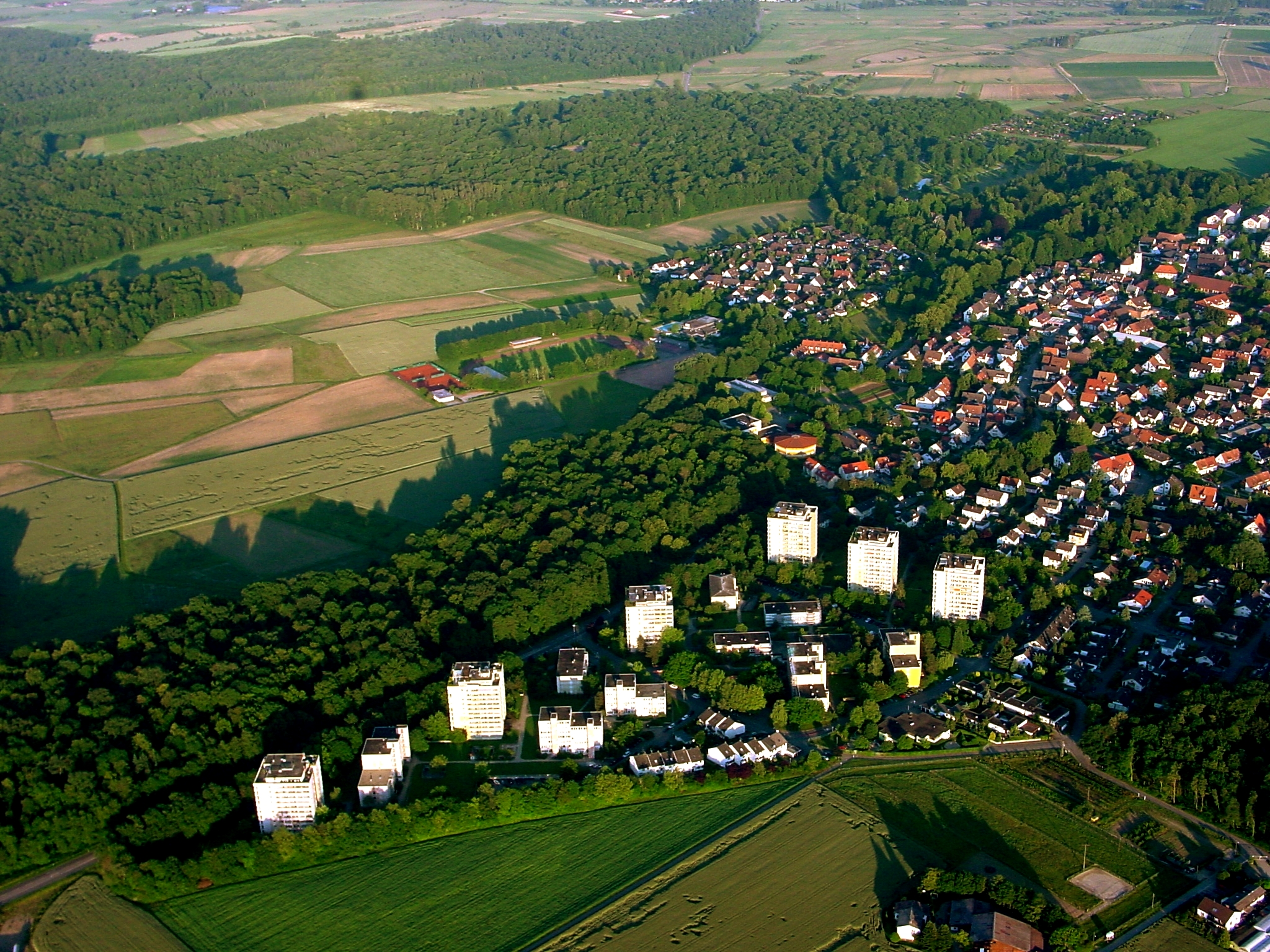
- Aerial view

- Coat of arms

- Location of Umkirch within Breisgau-Hochschwarzwald district
- Interactive map of Umkirch
- Location within Germany Location within Baden-Württemberg
- Coordinates: 48°01′58″N 07°45′49″E
- Country: Germany
- State: Baden-Württemberg
- Admin. region: Freiburg
- District: Breisgau-Hochschwarzwald

Government
  - Mayor (2018–26): Walter Laub

Area
  - Total: 8.72 km^{2} (3.37 sq mi)
- Elevation: 219 m (719 ft)

Population (2025-12-31)
  - Total: 5,683
  - Density: 652/km^{2} (1,690/sq mi)
- Time zone: UTC+01:00 (CET)
  - Summer (DST): UTC+02:00 (CEST)
- Postal codes: 79224
- Dialling codes: 07665
- Vehicle registration: FR
- Website: www.umkirch.de

Umkirch (German pronunciation: [ˈʊmkɪʁç]; Low Alemannic: Umkilche) is a municipality in the district Breisgau-Hochschwarzwald in Baden-Württemberg, Germany. It is located around 8 kilometres (5.0 mi) west of Freiburg im Breisgau.

== Geography ==
Umkirch lies in the Upper Rhine Plain about 8 kilometres (5.0 mi) west of Freiburg. The municipality includes: the village of Umkirch; the Dachswangen Farm and Mill (Dachswanger Mühle); and the former settlements of Rendelshusen and Betlinshusen. It is bordered on the south and east by Freiburg, on the north by March, and on the west by Gottenheim.

== History ==
The settlement has existed since Roman times (about 100 BC) and was called Latin: Ecclesia in Undis (Church beneath the Waves - maybe because of the two small streams that pass through the village). Sigillat shards and coins have been found and the church was built on top of a Roman building, as a part of its wall was found. When the Romans left in sixth century, Alemanni clans settled in Umkirch, ruled by the Lords of Üsenberg, a noble family, and later by the Kageneck family.

Umkirch is first mentioned in the historical record in 1087 in a document about the exchange of the priory of St. Ulrich between the Bishop of Basel, Burkard, and Cluny Abbey in France. A witness present at the deal is named as "Humbert de Untkilcha". In 1270, Umkirch was given to the knight Dietrich Snewlin, later to several others, among them Martin Malterer, the count palatines of Tübingen and Flora Countess of Wrbna, until it was given to Grand Duchess Stephanie of Baden. In 1806, Umkirch became part of the district of Freiburg. The village of Dachswangen became part of Umkirch in 1924.

On April 20, 1945, Umkirch was occupied by the French after World War II and was administered by governor Pierre Pène. During World War I, Umkirch lost twenty-one citizens, during World War II, thirty citizens. Twelve others are recorded as missing in action.

== Church ==
The first church in Umkirch was built by a Frankish magistrate, called Centenarius Elilant. He was also called "Hunde" (meaning leader of a hundred). Apparently this name was given to the village: Hundechilche, meaning "Hunde's Church". The church of Umkirch dates back to the second half of the eleventh century. It is one of the oldest churches in Breisgau. The church was mentioned first in a letter, dated April 14, 1139 from Pope Innocent II, to Basel.

== Economy and infrastructure ==
Umkirch is adjacent to the Freiburg-Mitte interchange of the Bundesautobahn 5, which connects with the Bundesstraße 31 (B31) east to Freiburg. The connection west was to Main Street through the village with resultant traffic challenges, but the B31 bypass was built in sections opened in 2007 and 2012, leading the major part of the traffic around the village.

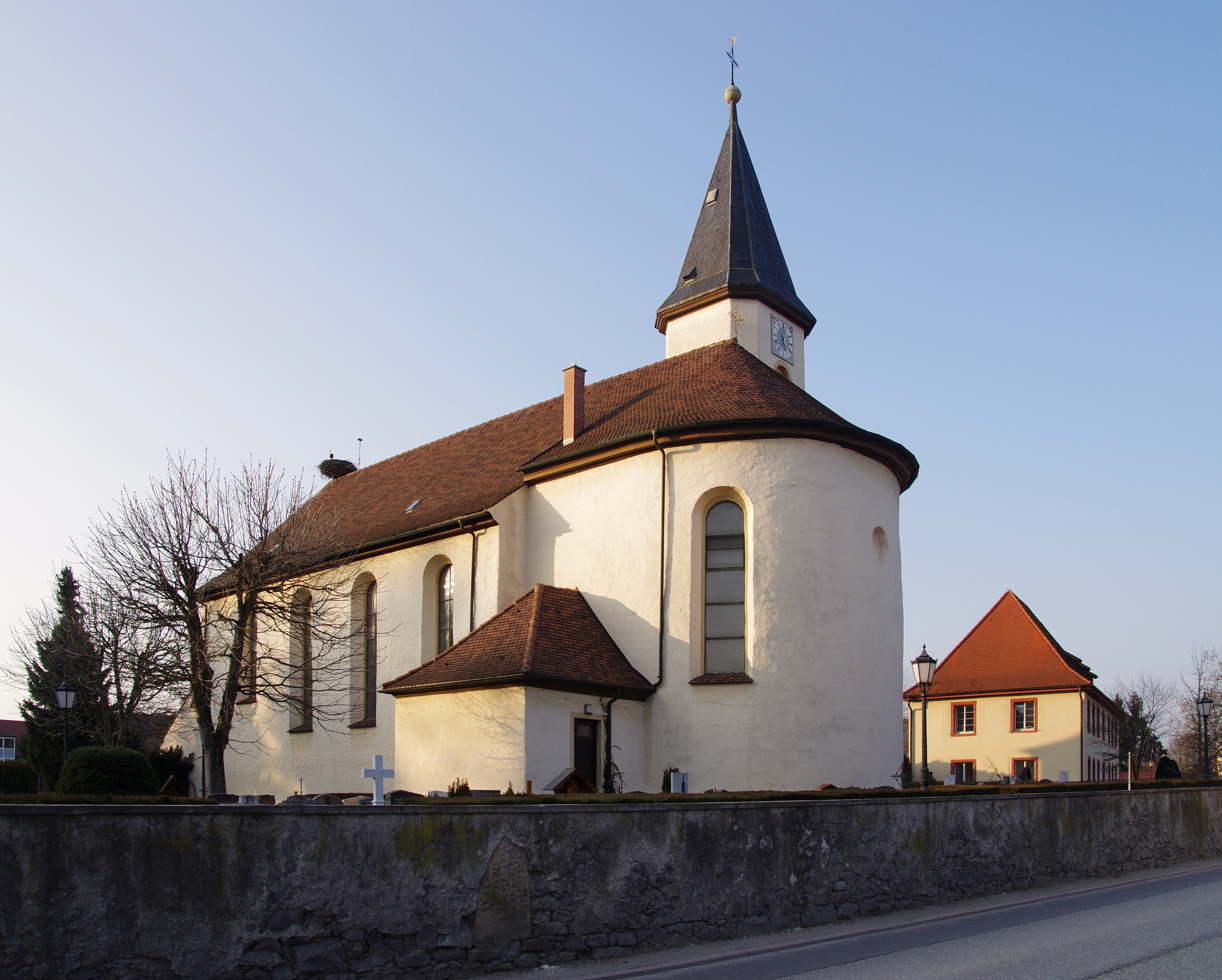
The church of Umkirch

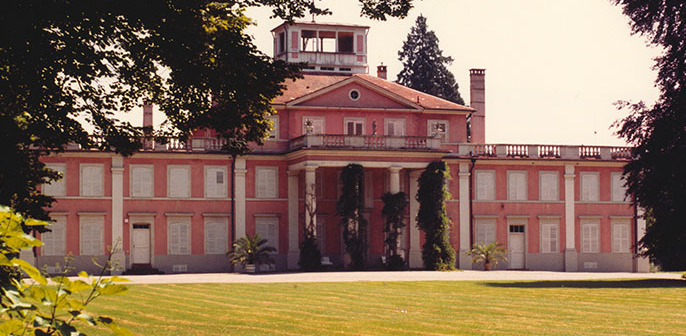
The palace of the House of Hohenzollern-Sigmaringen (private property)

== Politics ==
=== Mayors ===
(with the year they first assumed office)

- 2002 Walter Laub
- 1986 Ulrich Greschkovitz
- 1959 Franz Heitzler
- 1946 Serafin Frieder
- 1946 Franz Spiegelhalter
- 1945 Anton Hirzle
- 1941 Serafin Risch
- 1935 Theodor Knoll
- 1920 Wilhelm Hirzle
- 1900 Johann Kirner
- 1870 Franz Xaver Spiegelhalter
- 1862 Josef Hercher
- 1859 Mathias Hirzle
- 1832 Johann Schweitzer/Schweizer

=== District Council ===
The local elections on May 25, 2014 with a turnout of 46.3% (2009: 52.5%) had the following results:

Party / List	Percentage of vote	+/−^{*}	Seats	+/−^{*}
CDU	33%	-5.8	5 seats	-1
UBU^{1}	21.6%	-7.3	3 seats	-1
SPD	21.7%	-4.9	3 seats	±0
FWU^{2}	23.6%	+17.6	3 seats	+2

^{*} Change from 2009 ^{1} Unabhängige Bürgerliste Umkirch; ^{2} Freie Wähler Umkirch

=== Sister cities ===
- Bruges, Gironde, France; since 1989
