= Prinzenerlass =

1940 Nazi decree on nobility in the army

Prinzenerlaß

Adolf Hitler
- Territorial extent: Nazi Germany
- Enacted by: Adolf Hitler
- Enacted: 1940; 86 years ago

Prinzenerlass (German: [ˈpʁɪntsn̩ʔɛɐ̯ˌlas], "princes' decree", also spelled Prinzenerlaß) was the name of a 1940 decree issued by Adolf Hitler that prohibited members of Germany's formerly reigning houses from participating in any military operations in the Wehrmacht.

In May 1940, Prince Wilhelm of Prussia, the grandson of Kaiser Wilhelm II, took part in the invasion of France. He was wounded during the fighting in Valenciennes and died in a field hospital in Nivelles on 26 May 1940. His funeral service was held at the Church of Peace, and he was buried in the Hohenzollern family mausoleum in the Antique Temple in Sanssouci Park. The service drew over 50,000 mourners. His death and the ensuing sympathy of the German public toward a member of the imperial family greatly bothered Hitler, and he began to see the Hohenzollerns as a threat to his power. Shortly afterwards, the Prinzenerlass was issued, and all members of the former German royal houses were relieved from combat duties. The decree prohibited members of Germany's formerly reigning families from actively serving in the Wehrmacht, fearing that this would increase the public's sympathy for the deposed dynasties and threaten Hitler's grip on power.
