= Leibbrand =

Leibbrand is a German patronymic surname derived from the Germanic dithematic name based on two stems: luit/luid , 'people' and -brand, 'sword'. Notable people with the surname include:

- Anna Leibbrand (1902–1972), German political activist and writer
- Annemarie Leibbrand-Wettley, German medical historian
- Kurt Leibbrand (1914–1985), German engineer
- Werner Leibbrand, German psychiatrist and medical historian

== See also ==
- Leibbrand, Leibbrandt, Leibrandt, Liebrandt, Liutbrand, Liutprand, Lybrand
