= Zurich Underground Railway =

Rapid transit project in Switzerland

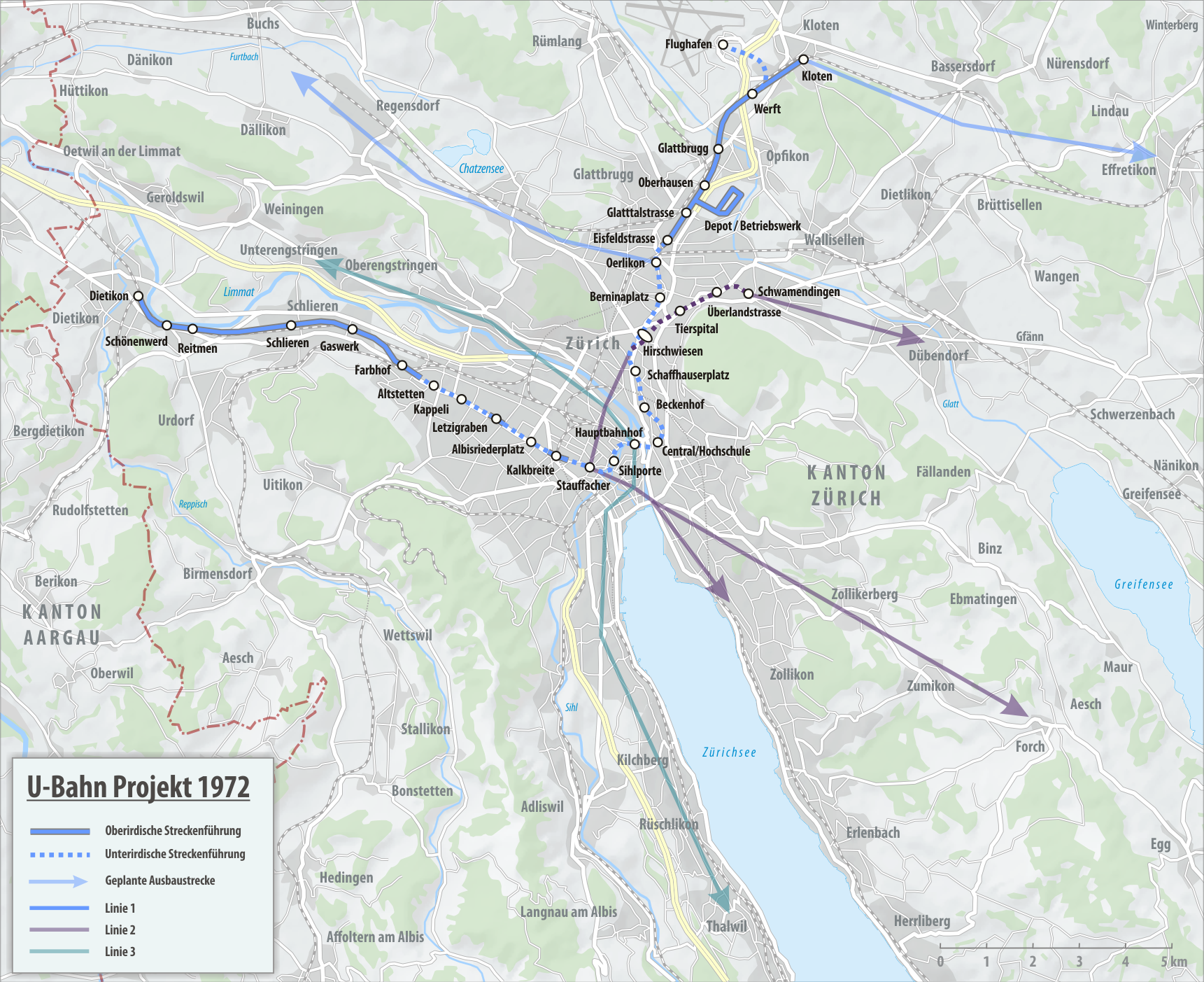
Plans for the underground line (1972)

The Zurich Underground Railway, or Zurich U-Bahn, was a project started in the 1970s to build a rapid transit network in the Swiss city of Zurich and several bordering municipalities. This project was itself preceded by several earlier plans dating from between 1864 and 1959. In April 1962, the "Tiefbahn" (lit. "deep rail") project was proposed, which would have included placing the Zürich trams underground in the city centre by building 21.15 km of underground lines, this was rejected in a referendum before any construction had been undertaken.

In the 1970s "U-Bahn" project, the first line would have led from Dietikon via Schlieren, Zürich HB, Oerlikon and Opfikon to Zurich Airport, including two short branch lines to Schwamendingen and Kloten. The two most important development axes of the agglomeration, Limmattal and Glattal, would have been joined onto the network. The line would have been 27.5 km long, 14.8 km of which would have been underground. At a later point in time the construction of two more lines was planned. In spite of initial optimism the project was rejected in a referendum by the voters in the canton of Zürich. Some parts of the lines, which had been built as preliminary work for the Underground that was never realised, are used today as the Milchbuck-Schwamendingen tram tunnel and as the terminus of the Sihltal Zürich Uetliberg Bahn.

Although the U-Bahn project was never completed, little opposition was expressed against the suburban rail lines that were proposed at the same time to complement the U-Bahn. These proposals eventually evolved into the current Zurich S-Bahn system, which uses several newly built tunnels to pass under both the city centre and adjoining hills.

== Initial plans ==
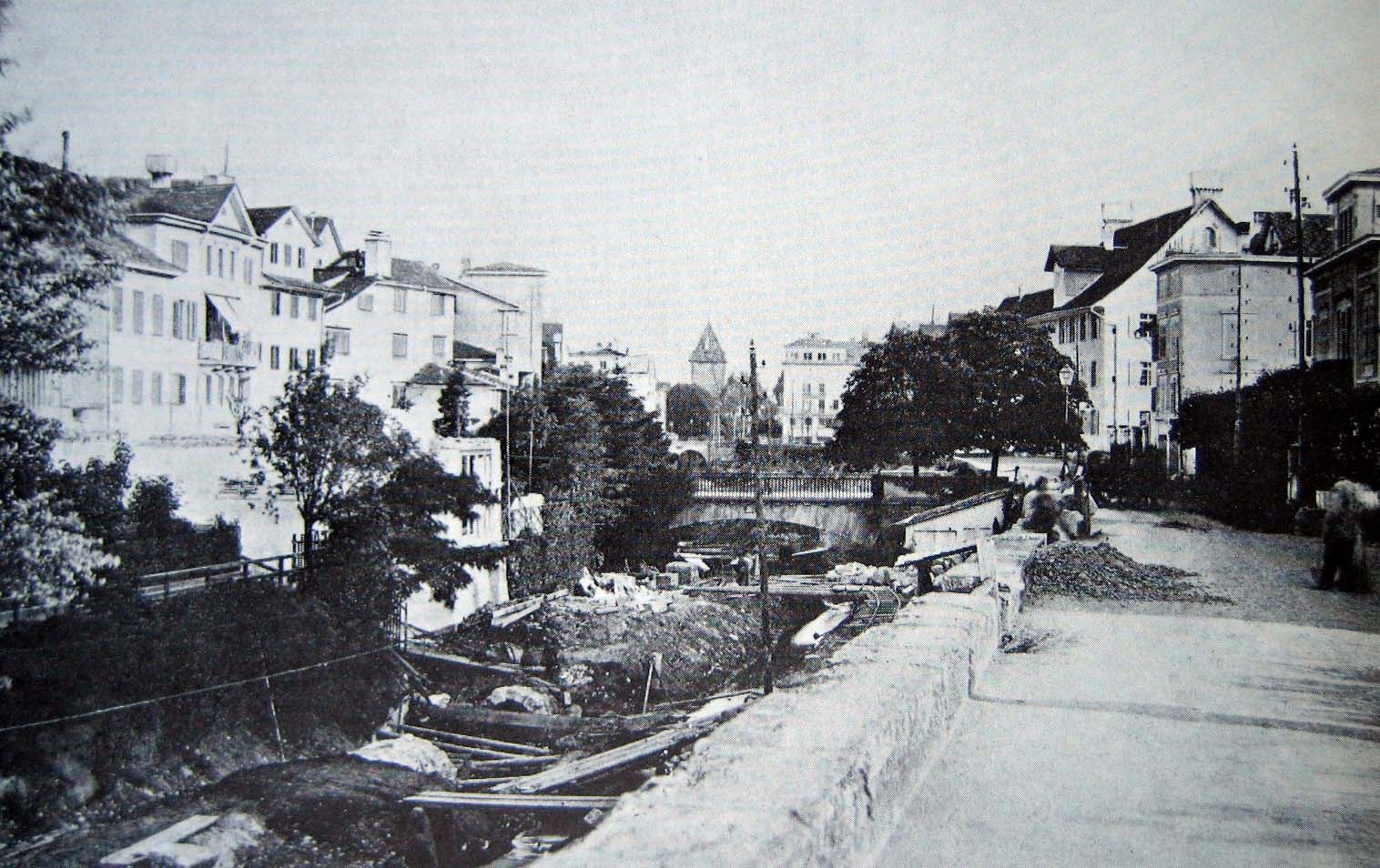
In 1864 a steam railway was to be built in Fröschengraben

In 1864, one year after the opening of the Metropolitan Railway in London, the Zürcherische Freitagszeitung (Zürich Friday Journal) published the visionary idea of a partly underground steam railway that was to go from the main station, along the Fröschengraben and end at Lake Zurich. However, the moat was filled up and became the Bahnhofstrasse instead. At the beginning of the 1930s, the development of the Zurich tramway network was by and large completed and newly built districts became accessible by bus and trolleybus lines. City architect Herbert Steiner, who had developed the Zurich building and zoning regulations in 1948, predicted that 550,000 people would be living in the city. He deemed the disentanglement of traffic streams and the massive expansion of public transport essential in order to realize the ideal of a garden city. However, in his opinion the city was and would always be too small for an underground railway. Architect Armin Meili and geographer Hans Carol held similar views, but due to the imminent post-war economic boom (Golden Age of Capitalism) and mass motorization, their voices remained almost unheard.

In 1946, Kurt Wiesinger, professor of engineering at the ETH Zürich, put forward plans for a highspeed train that would have covered the distance between Zurich main station and Oerlikon in two minutes. Architect Wolfgang Nägeli presented a more realistic project in the Schweizerische Bauzeitung in 1947. Several tramlines were to be relocated underground in the city centre. He proposed building a tunnel underneath the Bahnhofsstrasse between Bürkliplatz and the Platzspitz park, along with lines branching off from Paradeplatz to Sihlstrasse and from the main station to Weinbergstrasse. This first draft comprised 2.7 kilometres of tunnels, as well as 0.2 kilometres of ramps and bridges. He calculated the costs would be between 35 and 40 million Swiss Francs. In a second step, he planned a second stage from Weinbergstraße to Beckenhof covering 1.1 kilometres of distance (plus 0.7 kilometres for ramps) and costing another 14 to 18 million Swiss Francs.

On 28 March 1949, a private "initiative committee for an Underground Railway in Zurich", led by construction engineer Adolf Weber, submitted an application for a constructing and operating concession to the Federal Post and Railway Department. The plan was to build a widespread underground network which would cover 158 stations and have a length of 107 km – including lines from Zurich to Küsnacht, Witikon, Dübendorf, Kloten, Weiningen, Dietikon, Sellenbüren, Adliswil and Thalwil. After revision, the overall length was reduced to 90 km. The required capital investment of approximately two billion Swiss francs was to be supplied from private investors, at an interest rate partly guaranteed by the state. Considering the horrendous costs, an acceptance of the application by the Federal Assembly seemed to be unfeasible. Thus, the proposal was withdrawn.

On 30 May 1959, another committee handed in two civic appeals concerning the "realization of the Zurich underground on behalf of all voters". The first one addressed the city parliament (legislative authority) asking for the provision of 200 000 Swiss Francs that would be used for a report on two underground lines (Enge – Kloten and Altstetten – Tiefenbrunnen), with a total length of 19.7 kilometres. Since that type of appeal falls under the responsibility of the city council (executive authority), it was dismissed. The second one instructed the city council to solve traffic problems, in a way it would have enabled establishing an operating company for the Zurich underground on a public economical basis. As the city council had already commissioned a report for similar routes, it advised the voters to turn that request down. In the following election campaign there were several opinions saying that the plans were unrealistic and not properly thought through. According to them, Zürich didn't have the required size for an underground system and the costs ware too high. On election day, 14 February 1960, 69.8% (48'502: 20'944 votes) voted against the Zurich underground.

== The Premetro Project ==
Apart from these private initiatives, the authorities were also engaged in long-term transportation planning. In 1952, the city council commissioned two teams of experts to devise a general traffic management plan, one of which was led by Carl Pirath and Max Erich Feuchtinger of the University of Stuttgart, the other by Kurt Leibbrand and Philipp Kremer of the ETH Zurich. Their task was to find a solution to Zürich's traffic problems that should last until the 1980s. The calculations were done with a number of 555,000 inhabitants living in the city and more than one million in the urban agglomeration. The proposals presented by both teams in 1955 had several points in common. High-capacity corridors were to be created for motorized private transport and junctions to be disentangled by over- and underpasses, elevated roads and tunnels. The tramway was to be kept as the backbone of the local passenger transport and supplemented by underground routes. However, the two plans differed widely in one point: Pirath/Feuchtinger proposed an extensive light railway network, which could be transformed into a full underground network later on. Leibbrand/Kremer on the other hand wanted to realize a smaller premetro network in the inner city, known in Zürich as the 'Tiefbahn'.

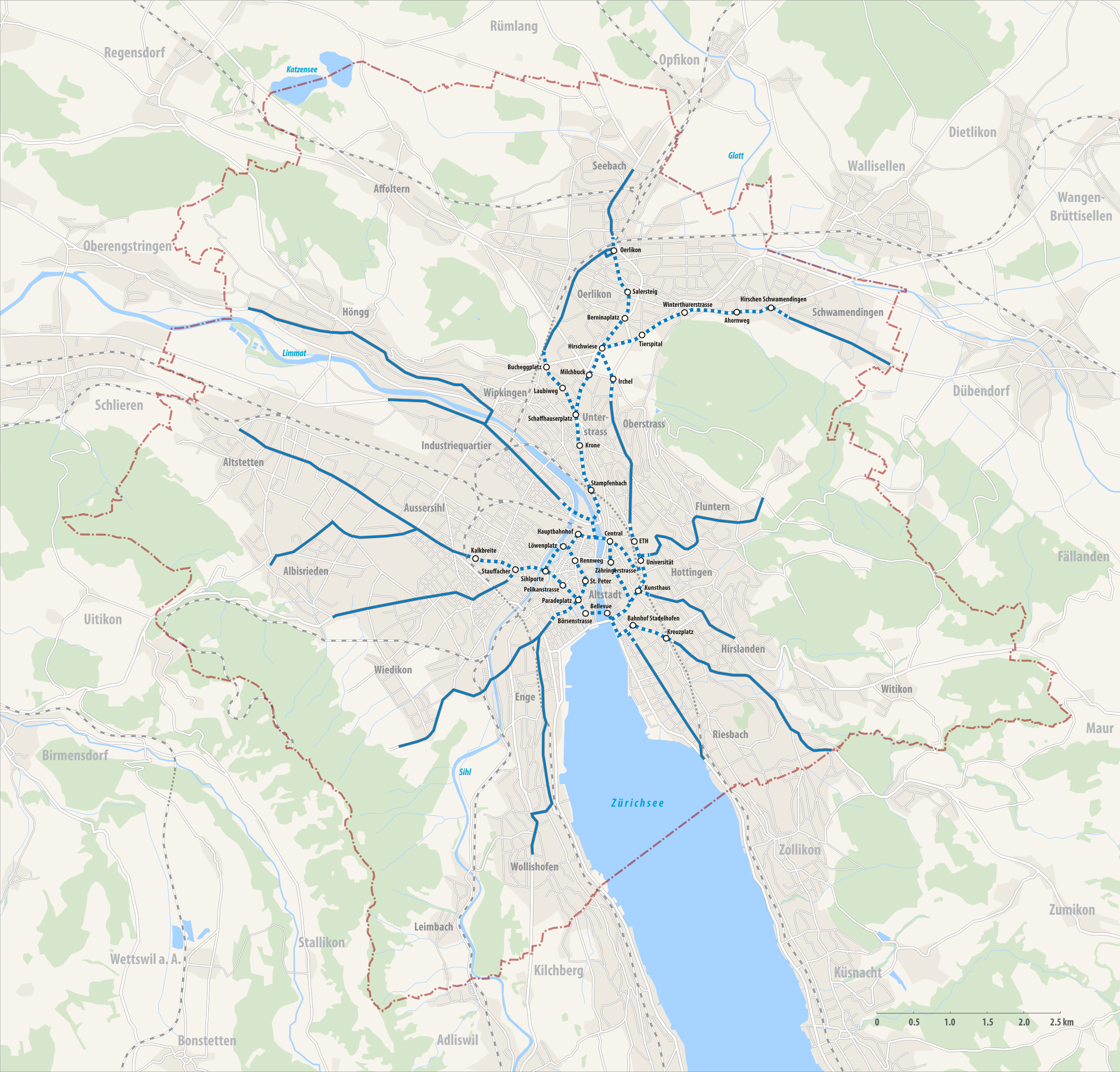
Planned premetro lines (1962).

The publication of the reports caused an intense debate over transport policy. While the expansion of the street network was uncontroversial, the public transport proposals provoked long-lasting discussions. The city council preferred the moderate project suggested by Leibbrand/Kremer. The city parliament, on the other hand, preferred the wide-ranging project suggested by Pirath/Feuchtinger. In 1956, professor Walther Lambert was hired as an additional consultant for network design and operational management. In March 1957, a technical committee was appointed as well. Finally, city council and city parliament reached an agreement to work out an underground project of their own. This task was handed over to a working group, which was led by city councilor Walter Thomann and the director of the VBZ, Werner Latscha. In addition to Kurt Leibbrand, the working group also included representatives of several underground construction and engineering companies. In January 1961, the city council presented a project which consisted of tunnel sections with a total length of 12.3 km. The costs (excluding land acquisition) were estimated at around 329 million Swiss francs. In December of the same year, the city council added a further stipulation: The underground network was to have a length of 21.15 km at a cost of 544 million Swiss francs. As an extension to the original project, sections to Oerlikon and Schwamendingen had been added, as well as smaller modifications in the city centre.

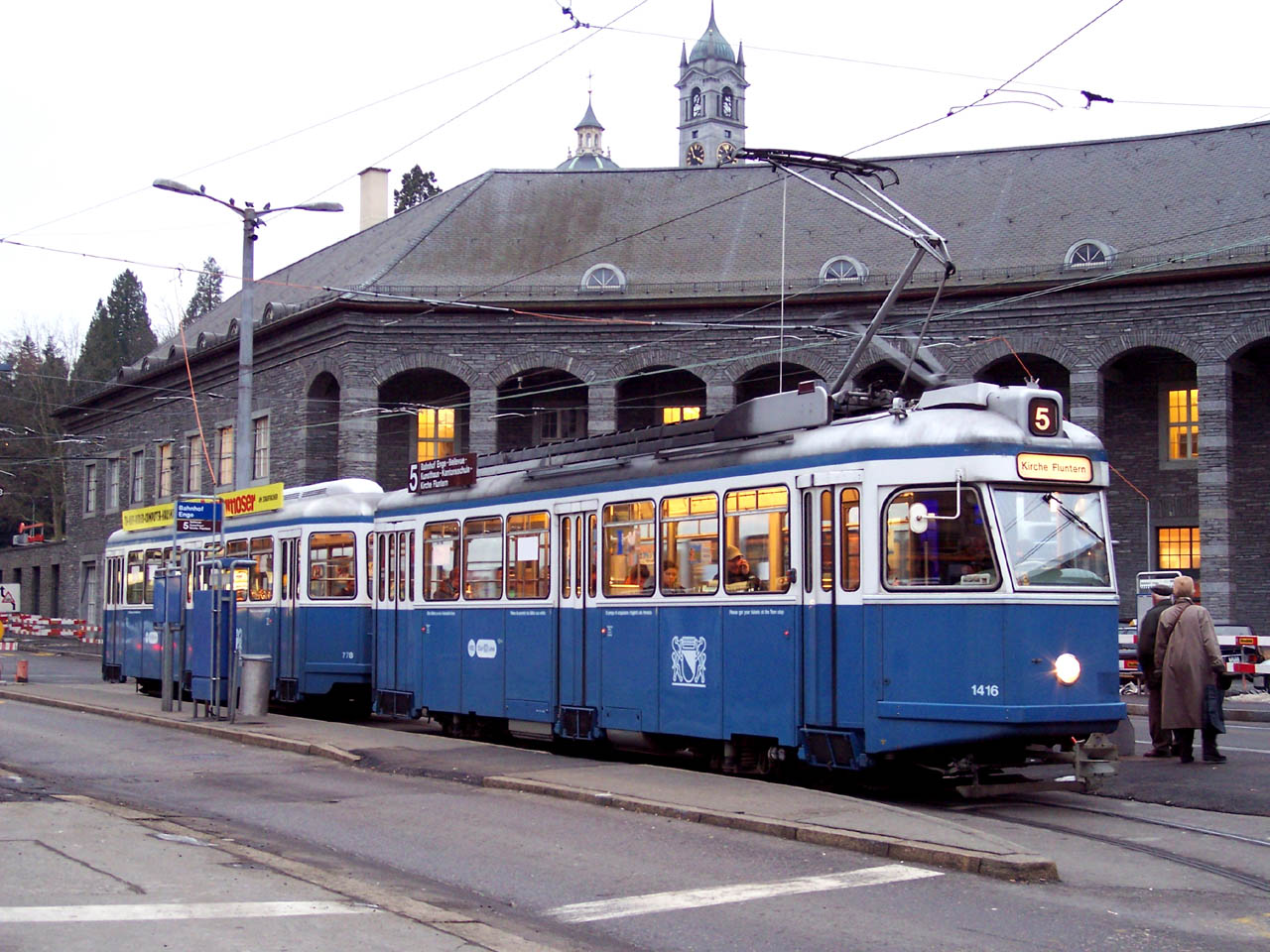
A tram designed for use in tunnels, type Be 4/4 («Karpfen»)

The following tunnel routes were planned:

- Kalkbreite/Birmensdorferstrasse – Stauffacher – Sihlporte – Löwenplatz – Zürich Hauptbahnhof (main station) – Limmatstrasse
- Sihlporte – Talacker – Paradeplatz – Bellevue – Seefeldstrasse/Kreuzplatz
- Bellevue – Heimplatz (Kunsthaus) – University of Zurich – Universitätsstrasse
- Zürich Hauptbahnhof – Central – Heimplatz – Hottingerstrasse
- Central – University of Zurich – Gloriastrasse
- Löwenplatz – Paradeplatz – Bleicherweg
- Zürich Hauptbahnhof – Schaffhauserplatz – Hirschwiese – Oerlikon – Schaffhauserstrasse/Binzmühlestrasse
- Irchel – Hirschwiese – Winterthurerstrasse – Hirschen Schwamendingen – Dübendorferstrasse
- Schaffhauserplatz – Bucheggplatz – Hofwiesenstrasse

Wherever possible, the cut-and-cover construction method was desirable. Some sections between Central and the university, underneath the Hirschengraben, and from Bellevue to Heimplatz, were to be constructed by drilling and blasting. A direct routing between the main station and Paradeplatz below the middle part of the Bahnhofstrasse was to be avoided due to water mains and cable tunnels. Instead, drilling a slightly curvy alignment along Rennweg and the western side of St. Peterhofstatt was suggested.

All the parties represented in the city parliament supported the project. However, it was rejected in the town referendum with 58,393 to 34,307 votes on 1 April 1962 (63% No). An "unholy alliance" of two groups with completely different motivations was responsible for this outcome. A non-partisan committee had fundamentally spoken against putting the tram below surface and criticized the traffic planners' indignation to restrict motorized private transport. However, a second group, which especially promoted the drivers' needs, demanded the abolition of the tram and requested the construction of an adequate underground network. 15 open coaches of type Be 4/4, also known as ‘carps’ and designed for potential use in tunnel sections with high platforms, had been delivered to the VBZ in 1959/60. As a consequence of the underground rejection, no further production series of this type of tramway cars was ordered.

== The Underground Project ==
=== Planning ===
At first, after the rejection of the premetro project, the authorities were puzzled because the defeat of the referendum by two factions with opposite views on the future of the tram and the automobile did not allow them to draw clear conclusions. In 1963, the city council appointed architect and interior designer Hans Marti as head of the newly created office of urban planning. Even though Marti was in favour of underground rail transport, he was very critical of claims to restructure the city in order to make it an automotive city. He thought it was illusionary that the tram would disappear from the city in the coming decades. The municipal authorities became convinced that the traffic problems could be solved only by regional planning transcending the city's territory, in cooperation with the Canton of Zurich and the confederation of Switzerland. In 1963, the cantonal council of Zurich granted a loan of 935,000 francs to draft overall plans, which, along with several other issues, also made the development of the transport network a subject of discussion. The canton and the city of Zurich, along with the Swiss Federal Railways, formed a coordinating committee in order to develop the transportation plan, which was included in the overall plan.

The committee's final report was submitted on 18 May 1966. According to this report, railbound transportation that is independent of roads was to bear the brunt of public transport, whereby a distinction was made between large, medium and fine distributors. The existing SBB railway network was designated as the large distributor which would serve the second suburban belt (from a radius of ten to twelve kilometres from the city centre). In the "metropolitan area" within this radius, a conventional underground railway would take on the task of a high-speed medium distributor, as buses and trams were deemed unsuitable. Instead, they were to serve as fine distributors and feeders for the underground railway. The tram network was to be adapted to the new circumstances which required the abolition of lines in the city centre and the construction of new lines in the city's outer boroughs. Interchanges between underground railway and suburban trains were planned on the border of the metropolitan area, from where suburban trains were to run without intermediate stops to the city centre.

A delegation consisting of members of several authorities was organised to realize the concepts proposed in the transportation plan. The city and the canton financed its work with two million francs each, whereas the Swiss Federal Railway contributed 250,000 francs for both the project costs and the costs for the planning of its own facilities. On 24 January 1967 the delegation met for the first time. Among its members were city president Sigmund Widmer, city councillors Ernst Bieri and Adolf Maurer, cantonal councillors Alois Günthard, Rudolf Meier and Hans Künzi, the directors general of the Swiss Federal Railway Otto Wichser and Karl Wellinger, as well as the Swiss Federal Railway district director Max Strauss. Künzi held office as president, Widmer and Weilinger as vice-presidents. Their tasks were diverse: clarification of legal issues, formulation of financing proposals, resolution of matters relating to management and construction, completion of the ongoing transportation plans for the wider region of Zurich, operational concepts and the planned expansion of the regional rail traffic, as well as public information. For this purpose, the delegation established eight task groups.

A three-line underground railway network was planned:

- Line 1 was to start from Dietikon, then lead to Zurich Airport, crossing Schlieren, Stauffacher, Zurich main station, Hirschwiesen and Oerlikon, with a short branch line going off towards Kloten. The branch line form Hirschwiesen to Schwamendingen was to be included in this first stage, Oerlikon-Furttal, Kloten-Effretikon and Schwamendingen-Dübendorf were to be added at a later stage.
- Line 2 was to go from Dübendorf via Schwammendingen to Hirschwiesen. From there, it was to cross Limmatplatz, Stauffacher and Paradeplatz and end at Bellevue, where it branched out towards Forch and Tiefenbrunnen.
- Line 3, the last one to be built, was to start in Unterengstringen, cross Höngg, Limmaplatz, the main station, Paradeplatz and Enge station and finish at Thalwil.

Line 1 was planned right through to the construction stage since it covered the two most important traffic axes in the metropolitan regions (Glatttal and Limmattal) and, according to the traffic concepts, it could be an efficient system on its own. The construction of the Schwamendingen branch line was also given priority, because this rapidly growing district was badly developed. The maximum speed of the underground was set at 80 km/h, the minimum radius at 245 m, the maximum inclination of the line at 40‰ and that of the stations at 5‰. The standard-gauge section was to be electrified with 1500 V direct current using a third rail. Eight-axle railcars of type Be 8/8 (45.6 m length and 2.9 m width) were planned as rolling stock. Railcars in groups of three formed a 136.8 m long train, with a total capacity for 1302 passengers (including 360 seats).

=== Description of line 1 ===
Line 1 would have been 27.521 km long – including the access to the depot in Opfikon (approximately located at today's Glattpark site). 12.7 km would have been above-ground and 14.8 km underground. 6 km of the tunnel sections would have been constructed using mining techniques, the remaining parts using cut-and-cover. Thirty stations with a length of 138 m each were planned. For the heavily used central section, a headway of 3 minutes (later every 2 minutes) was envisaged. According to the planning, 70 seconds would have been technically feasible. First, the section between Sihlporte and the airport was to be built within seven to eight years. The section Sihlporte-Dietikon and the branch lines to Kloten and Schwamendingen were to be operational after ten years.

Zurich Airport would have been the northern terminus. Under the Butzenbüel and Holberg hills, the route would have led to the overground station Werft, where a short branch line from the train station Kloten would have terminated. Subsequently, the underground was to proceed parallel to the existing SBB line from Opfikon to just after the Eisfeldstrasse station. There, the northern portal of the tunnel section was to be located. Following Ohmstrasse and Schaffhauserstrasse, the intersection at Hirschwiesen would have been reached (in the area of the Milchbuck tram stop). Here, 30 metres below the surface, two station tubes connected by cross passages were to be built, the western one for trains on the trunk line and the eastern one for trains from and to Schwamendingen. The Schwamendingen branch line was to proceed partly underneath the Schöneich Tunnel of the planned motorway approach road A1L, and was to end at Hirschenplatz for the time being. From Hirschwiesen, the line would have reached Zürich Hauptbahnhof by means of a broadly shaped S-curve, crossing beneath the Milchbuck Tunnel, the Letten Tunnel and the Limmat.

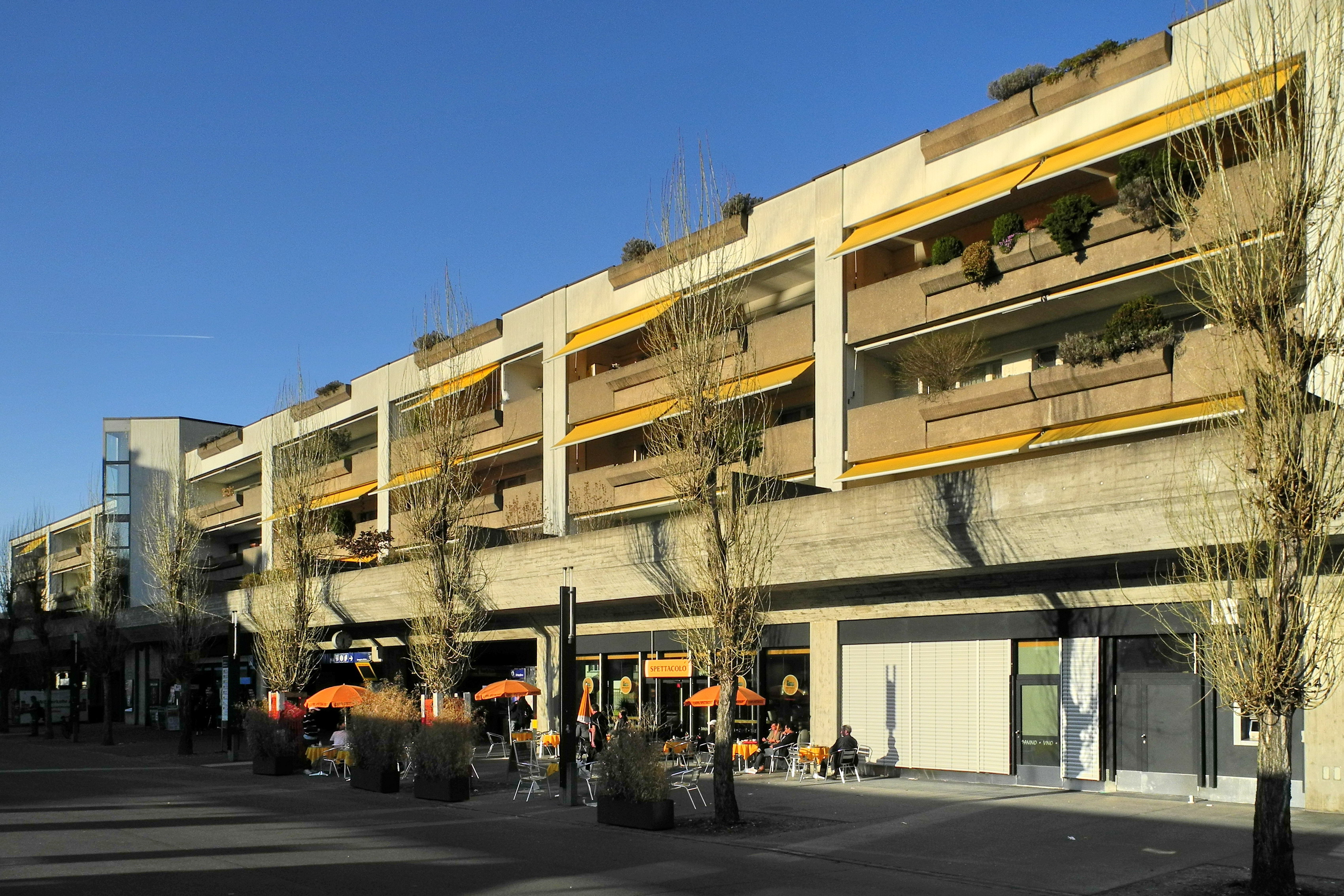
At Dietikon railway station, the U-Bahn terminus was planned alongside the first floor.

At the main station, the underground stop was to be located underneath Bahnhofplatz (station square) adjoining to the south. Later, a second tunnel stop was to be built for line 3. After passing under the Sihl and the still unbuilt motorway approach road to the A3, Stauffacher would be reached, where an interchange to line 2 was planned. Near the crossing with the Lake Zurich left-bank railway line, the above-ground Kalkbreite station was to be located. Following Badenerstrasse, the line would have been underground again, with the exception of Letzigraben station which would have been located in a short cutting. The sections between Albisriederplatz and Letzigraben was to provide an additional headshunt for turning trains. At the western periphery of Altstetten a viaduct was to cross the Zurich–Zug line, the Mülligen marshalling yard, and the Zurich–Bern/Basel line. Through Schlieren, the underground would have continued north of the railway line. A short tunnel near Poststrasse in Dietikon would have taken the line to the south side of the railway. The underground finally would have reached Dietikon railway station on a viaduct. The terminus was to be located on the first floor of the station building. Envisaged, but not planned concretely was a possible extension from Dietikon to Spreitenbach in the canton of Aargau.

=== Structural and legal preparations ===
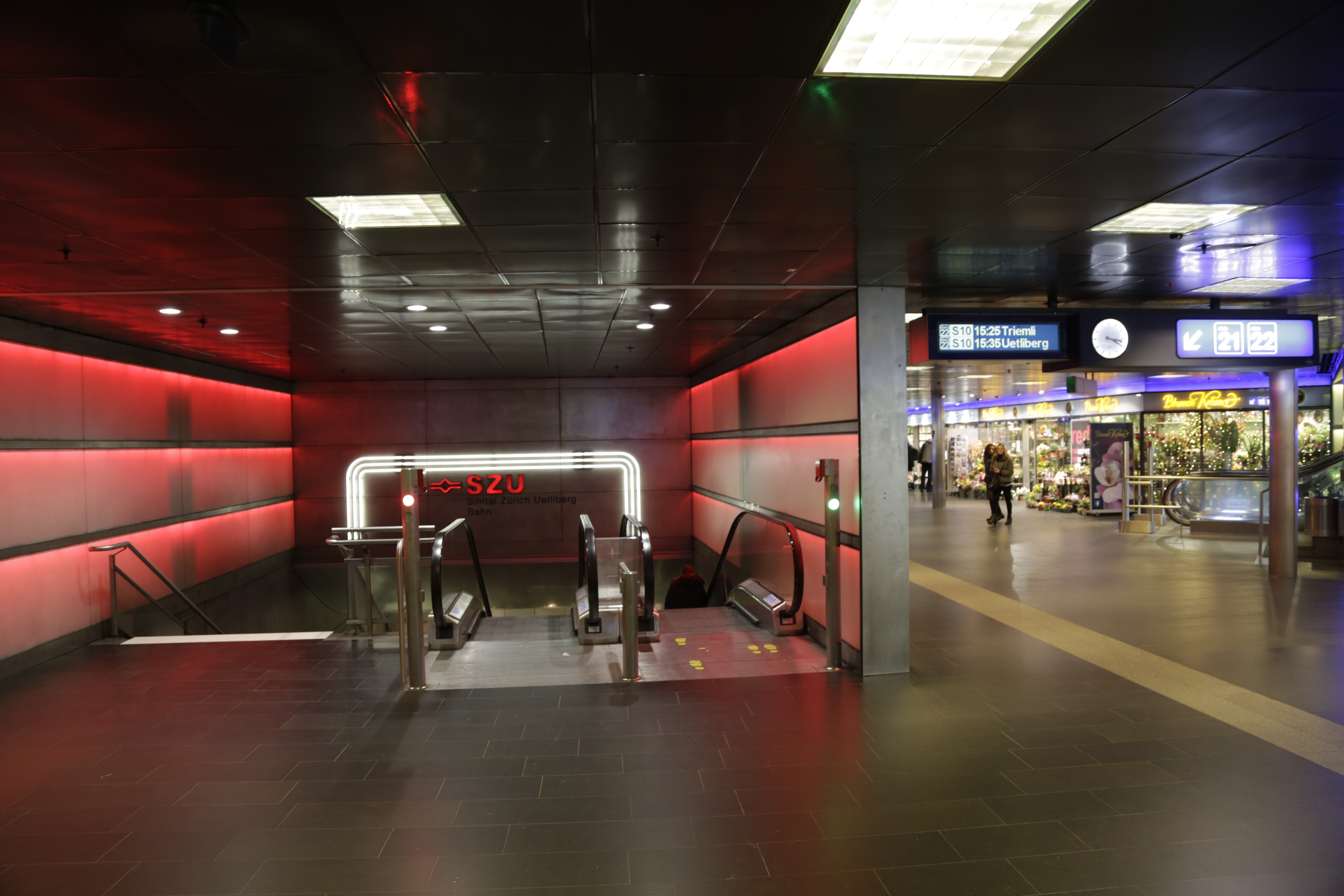
Access to the railway station of the Sihltal Zürich Uetliberg Bahn in the Shopville, once built for the subway.

Even before the planning of the underground project had been completed, several locations were prepared for construction. In connection with the airport extension, which took place from 1966 to 1968, an indoor car park was built underneath the motorway feeder road in front of the terminal. It was constructed in a way that rebuilding it into a subway station could have been achieved with minimal effort. While the construction of the shopping mall "Shopville" underneath Zurich main station was underway from 1968 to 1970, side walls for the possible underground station were built, too. A pedestrian subway was constructed at Schaffhauserplatz, which could have been used as an entrance to the underground station. In order to not unnecessarily slow down the construction of the motorway feeder road "A1L", a resolution was passed: Underneath and in conjunction with the Schöneich tunnel, the structural work was to be carried out on a 1364 m long section of the tunnel. The municipal authorities explicitly emphasized the possible usage as a tramline, should the underground project fail "against expectations". On 14 March 1971, the voters of Zurich agreed on this part of the project that would cost 31 million Swiss Francs. Voter participation was 56.2% and there were 111,413 "yes" votes (78.47%) against 31,395 "no" votes.

As a complement to the metro, the SBB had plans for an S-Bahn system, with the purpose of taking over most of the traffic on the outskirts of Zurich. This required the construction of the Hirschengraben Tunnel and the Zürichberg Tunnel. Initially, the costs for that project (an estimated 1.7 billion francs) were to be divided equally between the federal government, the canton of Zurich and the municipalities involved. As it then turned out, though, there was no statutory basis for the federal government to support an urban traffic system, thus denying federal aid for the metro project. It was then decided that the government would instead cover the costs for the S-Bahn system, estimated at 650 million Francs, while the funding of the metro was left to the canton of Zurich and the municipalities. On 6 March 1972, the Cantonal Council of Zurich unanimously decided to change the cantonal constitution, allowing the canton to financially support public transport, and to create regional public transportation enterprises. With 145:1 votes, the council also approved a regional transport law dealing with the implementation of the new constitutional amendment. On 4 June 1972, the two bills were put to vote in the canton of Zurich. Voter participation was 48.6%, there were 223,587 "yes" votes (82.57%) against 47,205 "no" votes for the constitutional change while the implementation bill passed with 224,546 "yes" votes against 47,502 "no" votes. On 13 March 1973, after having passed the National Council and the Council of States, the "Federal decree on granting a concession for an underground railway system in the Zurich region" became effective.

=== Failure after initial optimism ===
Zürich's transportation projects were typical for the seemingly boundless growth euphoria of the 1960s. For example, there was a vision of turning the Stauffacher/Sihlporte area into a modern business centre of gigantic proportions – a kind of "Manhattan on the Sihl" – making Zurich a truly global city. Initially, there was no real opposition. Except for the communist Swiss Party of Labour at local level and the Social Democratic Party at cantonal level, all political parties supported the construction of the underground railway and the S-Bahn system. An opinion poll conducted in December 1971 showed that 81% of Zurich's population was in favour of both projects. Opposition against the seemingly unstoppable growth of traffic first arose in 1970, when plans for rebuilding the Heimplatz in a car-friendly manner did not make it through a local referendum. Protests continued in 1971, with heavy resistance against the Zürich express road Y, a project for connecting three motorways in the city centre. After the Club of Rome had presented its report The Limits to Growth at the 1972 St. Gallen Symposium, an anti-growth stance also started to form amongst the general public.

In the run-up to the decisive referendum there had been demands to vote separately on the construction of the underground and suburban train systems. In fact, the suburban train was widely undisputed while a heated sociopolitical debate concerning the Underground broke out. In particular, members of the Social Democratic Party were against the "project of megalomania" (as they called it). They feared that the construction of the underground railway would lead to rising land prices, higher rents, and housing close to the city centre would be in danger of being converted into offices. This would lead to a displacement of the city's population to the suburbs, resulting in longer journeys to work. Moreover, opponents considered the costs for the underground "astronomically high". Supporters argued that the underground was a project of environment protection and asserted that many accompanying measures had been prepared in order to maintain and promote housing in the city. Their argument that without an underground there would be a "total gridlock" was deemed irrelevant, because the economy had started to slow down and the city's population decreased slightly.

On 20 May 1973, the electorate of the canton had to vote on the cantonal council's decision to allow for a loan in order to expand public transport in the Zurich region. This entailed the canton's financial contribution to the construction of the underground, for which 599.2 million Francs were to be approved. Additionally, the city of Zurich had to decide on a draft to expand public transportation. This included a contribution of the city to the construction of the underground and, to a lesser extent, the suburban train, as well as the founding contract for a public transport enterprise called "Verkehrsbetriebe der Stadt Zürich" (VRZ). For this, 545.5 million Francs were intended. The VRZ, which along with the city of Zurich would have included Dietikon, Kloten, Opfikon and Schlieren (the municipalities connected to the underground network) would have been an expansion of the already existing public transport enterprise Verkehrsbetriebe Zürich) which would have also carried out the underground operations. If both drafts had been accepted, the federal government would have made its contribution to the construction of the suburban train. This did not happen, though. At an above average voter participation of 64.2%, the voters rejected the draft of the canton with 234,320 against and 177,362 votes for the draft (56.92% against); only 34 out of 170 municipalities voted in favour of the draft. Even more clearly, the draft of the city of Zurich was rejected by 123,210 against and 50,114 votes for the draft (71.09% against). According to cantonal councillor Franz Schumacher of the Social Democratic Party, the rejection of the project had also been a rejection of unchecked economic growth. He also said that it referred to the Underground exclusively.

== Consequences ==
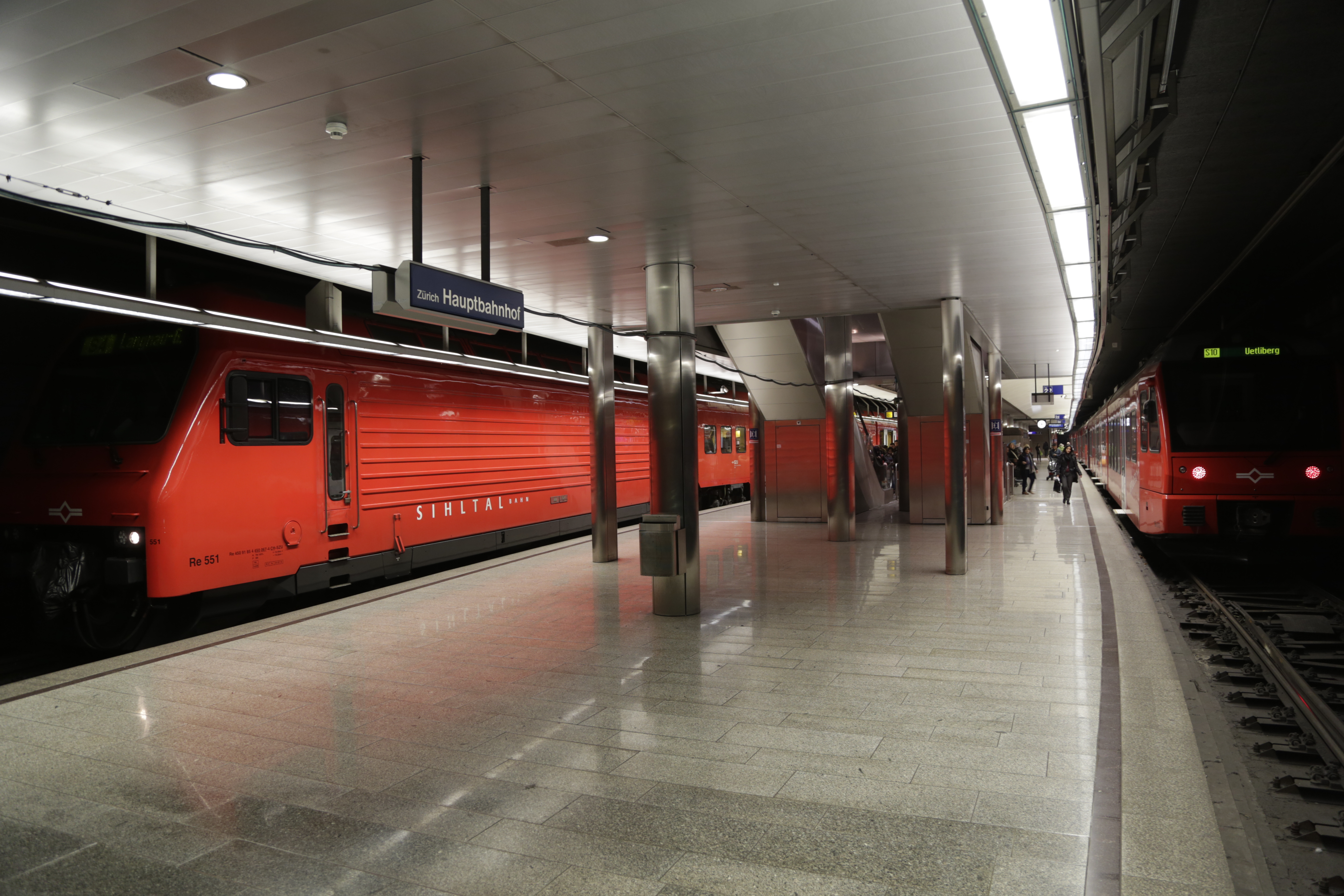
End-Station of the Sihltal Zürich Uetliberg Bahn

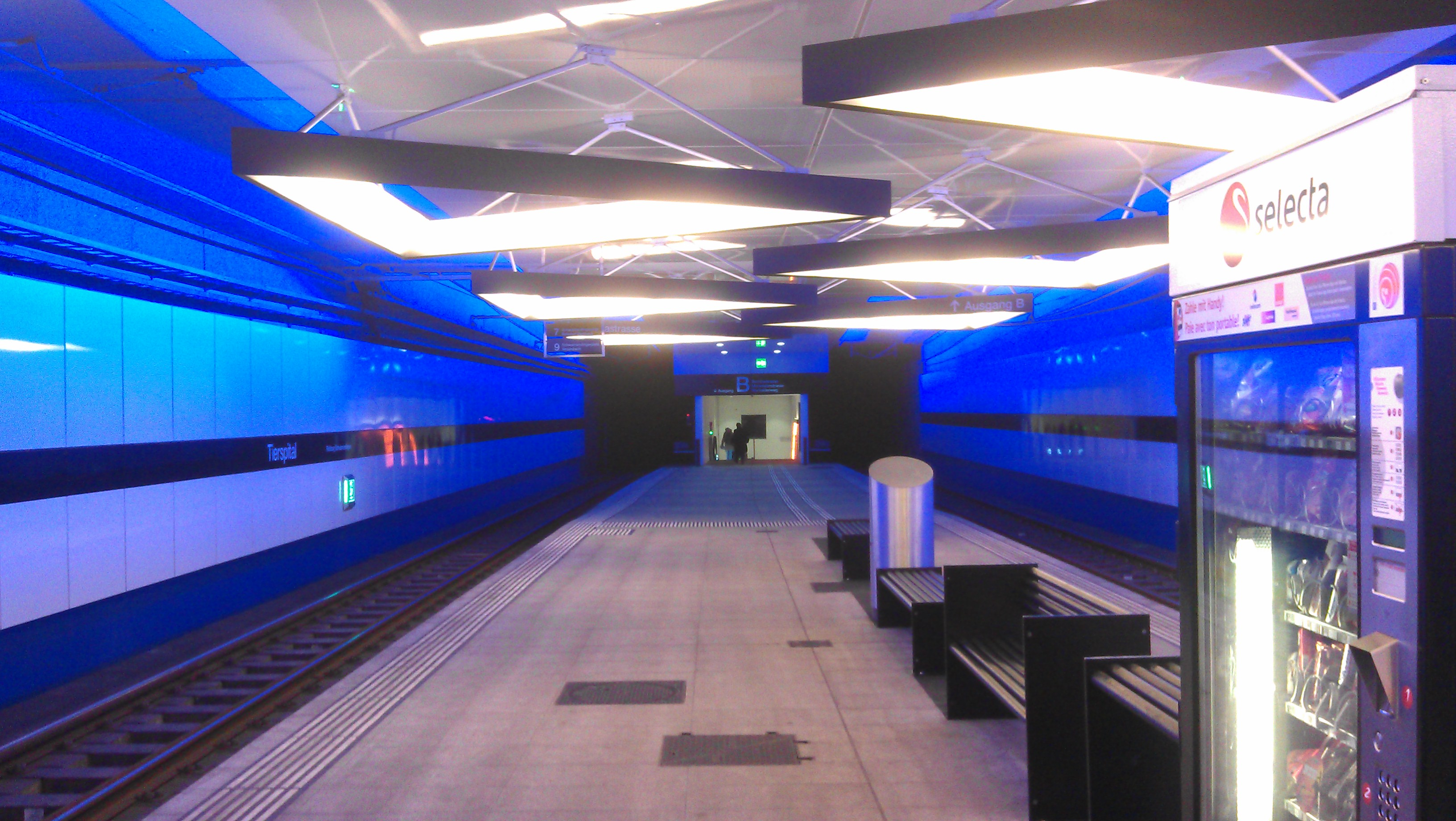
Undergroundtunnel which was converted into a tram tunnel with Station Tierspital

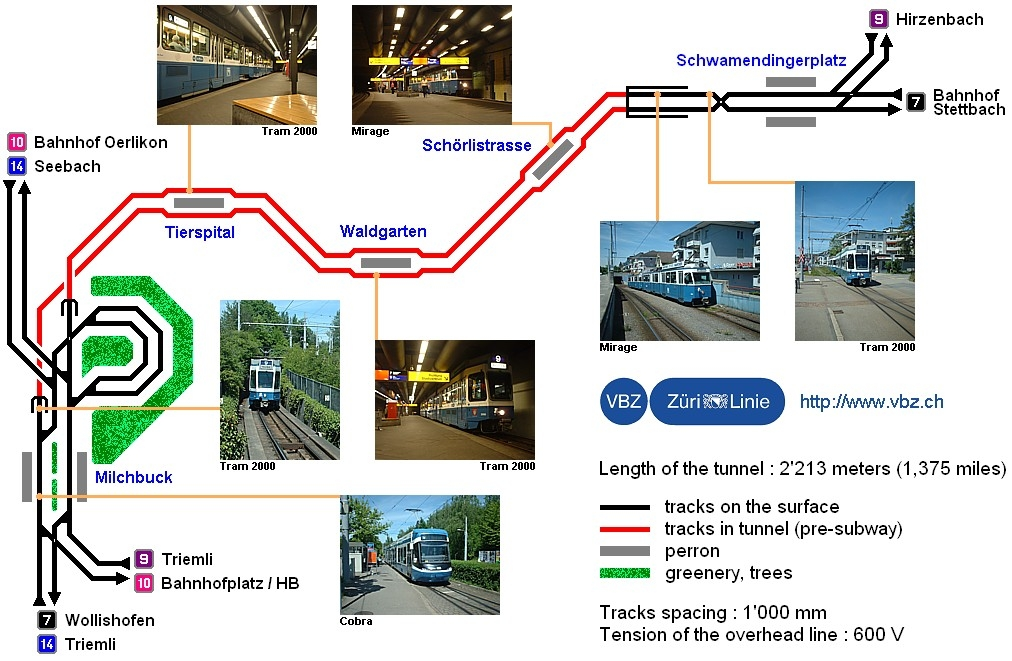
Plan of the Milchbuck–Schwamendingen tunnel

As early as 18 June 1973, the Social Democrats handed in a popular Initiative, in which a demand was made for a loan of 200 million francs, payable over 10 years, to fund the extension of the public transport system. The tram network that had been badly neglected, was to profit from this in particular. The city council dragged its feet over the issue, considering it unnecessary as they were following their own modernisation concept. However, on 13 March 1977 the initiative was narrowly approved with 61,599 votes to 58,588 (51.25%) in favour. Consequently, the Zürich tram network was extensively modernised and optimised. In 1978 the tunnel section below the A1L road that had been approved seven years ago was almost finished. Of the 200 million francs that had been approved, 123 million were earmarked for a new tramline leading from Milchbuck through the tunnel to Schwamendingen (and from there on to Hirzenbach and the Stettbach railway station). The plan was approved in a municipal referendum on 24 September 1978 by 69,170 to 44,627 votes (60.78% yes). The 2.5 km long Milchbuck–Schwamendingen tunnel started operating on 1 February 1986. Since then, two lines stop at the three underground stations there: Tierspital, Waldgarten und Schörlistrasse.

How uncontroversial the S-Bahn Zürich had been in 1973 was clearly proven eight years later on 29 November 1981, when the electorate of the canton of Zurich approved a loan of 523 million francs for building the S-Bahn with 73.75% in favour.

As part of the new S-Bahn, a further project was planned to connect the Sihltal-Zürich-Uetliberg-Bahn (SZU) to the Hauptbahnhof, the city's main station. Since 1875 and 1892, respectively, the SZU's Uetliberg line and the Sihltal line had terminated at Selnau station, which was on the edge of the city centre and distant from the Hauptbahnhof. After initially considering a short extension to a terminus at the (now defunct) Gessnerallee parking area, it was decided to make use of the partially constructed station under the Hauptbahnhof, which was far better placed. The new line was planned to be 1,592 metres (5,223 ft) long, with 1,281 metres (4,203 ft) in tunnel and was to include a new tunnel station at Selnau. Estimated costs of the project stood at 105 million francs. On 27 September 1983, the electorate of the canton of Zurich voted in favour of a loan of 72.41 million francs, with 67.48% "yes" votes. The federal government and the municipalities along the SZU lines then agreed to provide the remaining sum. Construction of the new line began on 4 March 1986, and the shell of the new tunnel was completed in the autumn of 1986. Finally, the SZU extension started operating on 5 May 1990, three weeks before the rest of the S-Bahn network.

The northern axis of the underground was never constructed but is served today by the Glattalbahn, the tram or Stadtbahn, which started operating between 2006 and 2010. There are plans to construct the Limmattalbahn from 2017 to 2022 on the western axis. However, in view of the increasing numbers of inhabitants and volume of traffic, in the early 2000s there were still repeated calls to construct a public transport network below ground. In 2003, a project by the name of "Sustainable Zurich" was initiated to gather further ideas. IT expert Thomas Mouzinho suggested a circular underground railway - the Zürkel - which was to run from Wollishofen via Albisrieden, Altstetten, Höngg, Affoltern, Oerlikon, Glattzentrum, Stettbach, Witikon and Tiefenbrunnen.

In 2011 the Professor for Transport Systems at the ETH Zürich, Ulrich Weidmann, once again took up the idea of constructing an underground tram below the city centre, similar to the 1962 underground railway project. In his opinion, the S-Bahn was overstretched and the tram too slow. The land freed up by dismantling the railtracks was not to be given over to roads - in contrast to the views of earlier traffic planners - but used in some way to increase quality of life.

On the basis of this idea, a student of Weidmann's, Christine Furter, wrote an MA thesis putting forward plans for a "Metrotram", which received an award from LITRA (an information service for public transport). The plans included tunnels up to 10.3 km long and 18 stations. Despite the estimated costs of between 2.3 and 2.75 billion Swiss francs, this plan was economically far more feasible than another suggestion for a further underground network.

In December 2015 two members of local government from the Green Party formally demanded that the government produce a report on the possibilities for an underground network in the area of Zürich. They did not make concrete suggestions as to where exactly the tracks should run, but were adamant that the main station should not be included, in view of the enormous amount of traffic it was already carrying.

The council answered in March 2016 that an underground in the city of Zurich was neither necessary nor feasible, and would, in addition, cost far too much money.
