= Günter Rittner =

German painter and illustrator (1927–2020)

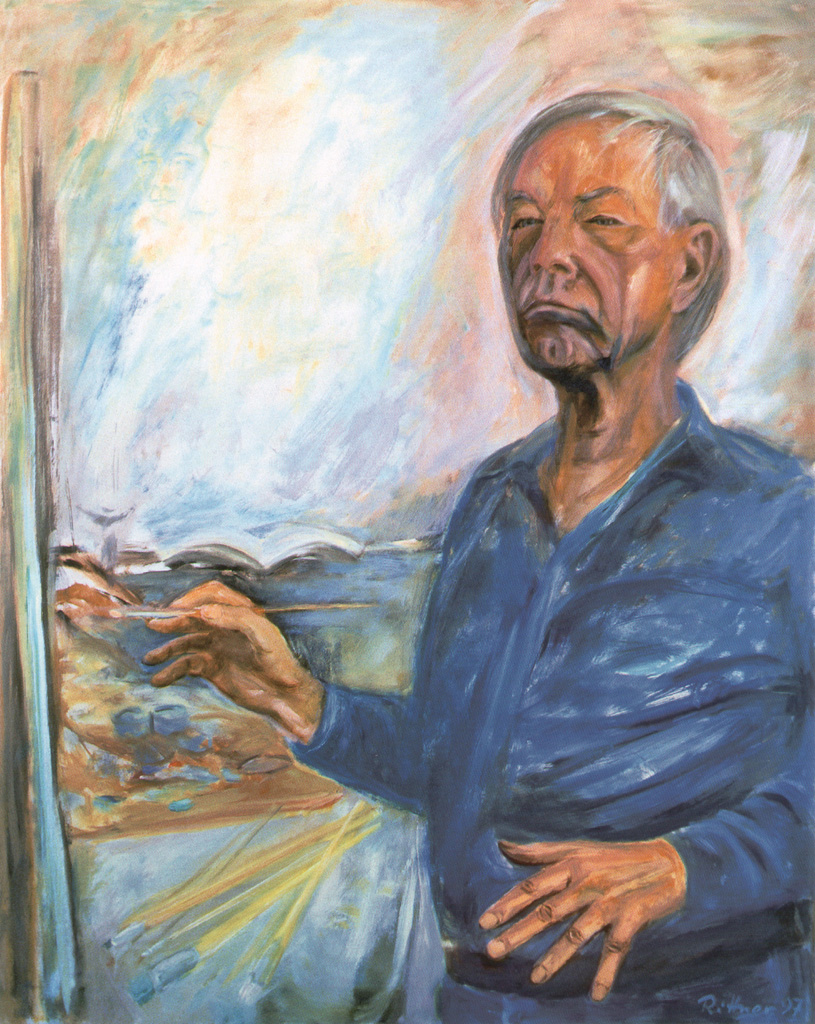
1997 self-portrait

Günter Rittner (11 March 1927 – 23 November 2020) was a German painter and illustrator. He ranks among the best known German portrayers of the 20th Century. Rittner's portraits of Ludwig Erhard as well as of Kurt Georg Kiesinger are the foundation of the Gallery of Chancellors, established in 1976 by former Chancellor Helmut Schmidt in the Bundeskanzleramt in Berlin.

== Life ==
Rittner was born in Breslau, Silesia, on 11 March 1927. As early as six years old, he had already created portraits of his grandparents. In 1939 he painted the injured as well as ordinary soldiers in a military hospital located in the Giant Mountains. In the same year he started attending evening classes in scenery painting at the Breslau School of Fine Arts, where he met his friend and colleague Hans-Ulrich Buchwald, painter and illustrator.

In 1943, his first self-portrait (oil on canvas) won the first prize in a rural competition. His father urged him to become an art-teacher, but that did not suit him. In 1944 Rittner received his military-draft and one year later he was captured as a prisoner of war, where at first he drew portraits of his fellow prisoners on toilet-paper by use of a borrowed pencil. Later on he painted the onsite security force and finally the camp commander, who from now on provided material and paint. After his release the same year, he financed his further studies in Fine Arts by portraying members of the American occupation force in Germany, hence improving his talent. In 1948 he settled in Munich, his second home, where he attended the Munich Academy of Fine Arts until 1953. His taskmasters were the professors Josef Hillerbrand as well as Walther Teutsch. The immediate impressions of the war time, including human suffering and dying, now came to the surface. His idols Ernst Barlach and Käthe Kollwitz inspired him in similar ways as did Cézanne, van Gogh, Gauguin and Toulouse-Lautrec.

In 1953 Rittner started working as a freelancer. In the following years he travelled to Italy, France and England on educational journeys, where he created numerous paintings of cities and landscapes. In 1966 his works were exhibited publicly for the first time in the Munich Deutsches Theatermuseum. Many orders from the world of politics, business and science followed, among them those of former Chancellors Ludwig Erhard and Kurt Georg Kiesinger 1974–1976, as well as the portrait of the former President of the Federal Republic of Germany, Walter Scheel in 1975 for the Scheel-Foundation. Rittner travelled to Greece for further studies in 1978 and in the following year he managed to participate in an exhibition of the Kasseler Kunstverein (member based art society with exhibition space). In 1980 Rittner married and moved with his family first to Mallorca, then to Gran Canaria. Rittner got divorced however. He is father of a son.

In 1989 Rittner was awarded the German Federal Cross of Merit.

As honorary citizen of the city of Solingen, Walter Scheel was portrayed a second time by the painter in 1996. Rittner then donated the honorarium of DM 23000 to the Diesterweg-Foundation for learning-disabled children.

Since 1986 Rittner lived on Gran Canaria in the wintertime; he stated however: "I will never give up on Munich, since the city inspires me." Rittner died in Munich on 23 November 2020 at the age of 93. One of his last works was the portrait of Italian model and writer Demetrio Baffa Trasci Amalfitani.

== Work ==
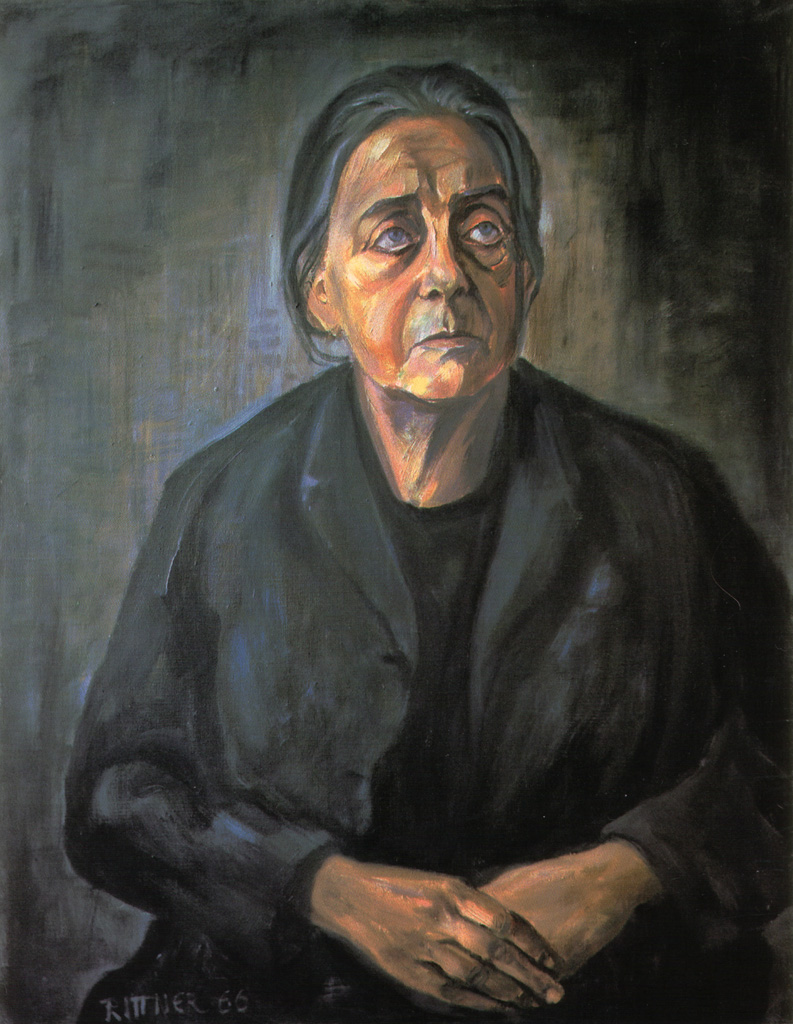
Therese Giehse (1966)

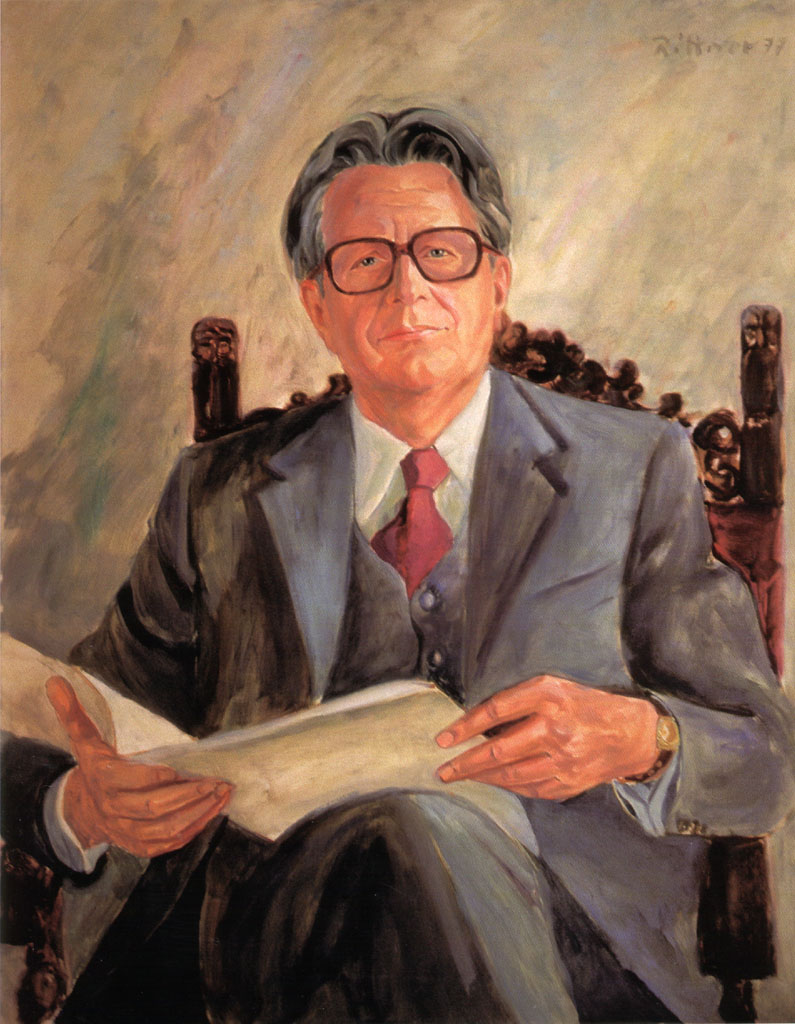
Hans Jochen Vogel (1977)

In 1950 Rittner portrayed Princess Pilar of Bavaria. She turned out to be very helpful to him, since being a painter herself, she appreciated Fine Arts very much. Furthermore, as President of the German-American Ladies Club, she was in a position to pave many ways for him. Yet in the same year he was hired to portray George N. Shuster, then U.S. Land Commissioner for Bavaria, as well as eight leading actors of the Oberammergau Passion Play. In 1952 he created outlines of Werner Krauß, Will Quadflieg and Hermine Körner at the German Theatre in Hamburg. In 1954 and 1955 he painted the movie director Paul Verhoeven, as well as the actors Luise Ullrich, Winnie Markus, Carola Höhn and Bertl Schultes. In 1964 paintings of Curd Jürgens followed as well as in 1965 portraits of Paul Dahlke. Furthermore, Rittner had meanwhile painted former Bavarian Prime Ministers Fritz Schäffer, Wilhelm Hoegner and Alfons Goppel by order of the Bavarian State Chancellery. In October 1964 Schäffer made a comment concerning the portrait of him "Rittner's painting forces people to cogitate on me though – this flatters me.“

Among the important scientists portrayed by the painter are Feodor Lynen, Munich Biochemist (1964 Nobel Prize in Physiology or Medicine) as well as Werner Leibbrand, Medical Historian. The co-operation with Pianist Elly Ney was of major significance to Rittner, since the interactive influence made him paint in an astonishing expressive way. A formerly unknown universe had opened. He described it as follows: "[...] The mental interchange was so immense and full of joy, I was able to live on it for years. [...] The artist enthused people by her dedication to music, her humanness rising from her gentle heart and last but not least her virtuosity.“

In 1966, Rittner created the expressive and perfect in form portrait of Therese Giehse, giving the main character of Mother Courage in Berthold Brecht's play Mother Courage and Her Children. Upon the recommendation of Herbert Hohenemser, Municipal Consultant for Fine Arts of Munich, Rittner began creating a gallery of prominent members of the Munich Kammerspiele Theatre. Among them are Peter Lühr, Rudolf Vogel and Robert Graf, as well as Gertrud Kückelmann, Rolf Boysen and in 1967 Fritz Kortner. Furthermore, in 1967 he portrayed ingeniously smirking satirist Werner Finck, founder and head of the legendary Berlin cabaret Die Katakombe, as well as he painted Joseph Keilberth, Conductor and General-music-director. He donated the Keilberth to the Bavarian State Opera. Baritone vocalist Karl Schmitt-Walter and chamber singer Hans-Hermann Nissen were also portrayed then. In 1968 he created drawings of Heinz Rühmann, who shortly before his death in 1994 had signed them.

Important ecclesiastic dignitaries may also be found in Rittner's work. In 1967 the artist painted Martin Niemöller, former President of the Evangelic Church of Hessen and Nassau. In 1968 he portrayed Cardinal Julius Döpfner in an austere way, rich in ideas. In 1998 he created the portrait of Cardinal Friedrich Wetter for the Archdiocese of Munich and Freising. Since 1970 numerous orders from the world of business have been concluded. He has painted Otto Braun, manufacturer of pharmaceuticals in Melsungen, Willy Messerschmitt and Ludwig Bölkow, aircraft designers (formerly MBB, now EADS), as well as Max Schmidheiny, Fritz Berg and Friedrich Wilhelm, Prince of Hohenzollern. In 1975 Rittner portrayed Franz Josef Strauss, Chairman of the CSU and Prime Minister of Bavaria by order of the CSU-faction in Bonn. In 1977 he painted Hans-Jochen Vogel, Lord Mayor of Munich (1960–1972) by order of the Bavarian State Capital, as well as in 1996 Hans Zehetmair, Secretary for Cultural Affairs. Impressionism turned out to be the most appropriate way to paint characteristically.

Classical music has always been a major inspiration for the artist. Whilst portraying Senta Berger he listened to Mozart. Among his favorite composers are Bach and Beethoven. When painting Therese Ghiese, he listened to Anton Bruckner's 9th Symphony.
When painting landscapes and architectural structures, he expressed immense cheeriness, keen on bright colours. In 1962 alone, he created 18 paintings of the city of Venice. Some of them still exist. Rittner painted the Munich Hofgarten, Viktualienmarkt as well as the Chinese Tower in the English Garden and the famous Oktoberfest. Since that turned out to be not of further interest to the artist, with advanced age, he developed his second profound period: religious topics. He had painted the sufferings of Christ before in deep black which was the idiom of extensive expressiveness.

Finally this is how the artist who knew how to find the strong and weak sides of people reflects upon his life: "[...] While constantly being at work in my studio, without knowing what time it was outside, I didn't notice having been standing at the easel for more than ten hours. So I got lost in time and space, until my eyes and hands started to work autonomously. [...] Sometimes it's like after a prayer or a meditation; the sensation of catharsis comes to your mind.“
