= Lybrand =

Lybrand is a surname of Swiss origin. Notable people with the surname include:

- Archibald Lybrand (1840–1910), American lawyer, soldier, businessman, and politician
- Lacie Lybrand (born 1982), American beauty queen
- William Mitchell Lybrand (1867–1960), American accountant and co-founder of the accounting firm Lybrand, Ross Bros. & Montgomery, a predecessor of PricewaterhouseCoopers
- Willa L. Fulmer (1884–1968), American politician

== See also ==
- Leibbrand, Leibbrandt, Leibrandt, Liebrandt, Liutbrand, Liutprand, Lybrand
