= Leibbrandt =

Leibbrandt is a German surname, a variant of Leibbrand, derived from a given name. Notable people with the surname include:

- Georg Leibbrandt
- John Leibbrandt (1920–1996), South African cricketer
- Murray Leibbrandt, Economics professor
- Robey Leibbrandt
- Shari Leibbrandt-Demmon, Canadian-Dutch curling coach

== See also ==
- Leibbrand, Leibbrandt, Leibrandt, Liebrandt, Liutbrand, Liutprand, Lybrand
