= Sigmund Widmer =

Swiss historian, writer and politician

- Sigmund Widmer probably in the early 2000s

Mayor of Zurich
- In office 1966–1982
- Preceded by: Emil Landolt

Personal details
- Born: 30 July 1919 Zürich, Switzerland
- Died: 11 August 2003 (aged 84) Visp, Switzerland
- Party: Landesring der Unabhängigen (LdU)
- Education: University of Zurich, University of Geneva
- Occupation: historian, teacher, Dr. Phil.

Sigmund Widmer (born 30 July 1919 in Zürich, died 11 August 2003 in Visp) was a Swiss historian, writer and LdU politician who served as mayor of the city of Zürich.

== Early life and education ==
Born in Zürich to Bertha Gizella, née Oechslin, and Huldreich, Sigmund Widmer was a citizen of the city of Winterthur, raised in Zürich, and as a child, he also spent some time in the family of Ruth Guggenheim Heussler. He was educated as a primary school teacher in Zürich, and later studied History and German philosophy at the University of Zurich and at the University of Geneva from 1944 to 1948. Widmer habilitated as Dr. Phil., and worked in Zürich as a secondary school teacher (Mittelschullehrer) between 1949 and 1954.

== Political career ==
From 1950 to 1954 he was a delegate of the LdU political party in the legislative assembly (Gemeinderat) of the city of Zürich, and from 1954 to 1982 as a member of the executive city council (Stadtrat) as head of the Hochbaudepartement to 1966, and later as Mayor of Zürich. In 1963 Widmer was elected as Nationalrat and represented the Canton of Zürich in the National Council to 1966, and again from 1979 to 1991. As one of his most controversial projects as Stadtpräsident (mayor) of the city of Zürich, in 1971 Widmer initiated the plans for the satellite town Waldstatt (literally "city in the woods", also called Sigi-Ville) on the Adlisberg hill plateau for about 100,000 inhabitants, comprising an area of about 4.5 square kilometres (2 sq mi). In addition to 30,000 relatively affordable housing, 230 classrooms, 10 double gyms, swimming pools, shops, cinemas, churches, a hospital, hotels, a convention centre and a theatre were planned, as well as a subway and underground motorway connections, thus a completely car-free settlement on the surface would have occurred. The project was opposed, mainly for ecological reasons, and never realized, as well as, among others, the Zürich U-Bahn. Nevertheless, Sigmund "Sigi" Widmer forced the Zürich housing cooperatives to build affordable housing estates in the neighbouring municipalities, with the objective of opposing the housing shortage in the 1970s. The youth protests of the early 1980s, the so-called Opernhauskrawalle, marked the end of his term of office, but Sigi Widmer was very popular and became the city's Stapi (Swiss German, meaning "mayor") for 16 years; longer than all 20th-century Zürich mayors.

== Other mandates ==
In 1983 Sigmund Widmer initiated a parliamentary motion to establish the Historical Dictionary of Switzerland. Other mandates include the Mayor of the International Union Bureau for Franco-German understanding and European cooperation (1967–1977) and the bureau of the Pro Helvetia from 1986 to 1989. Widmer was honoured to hold the Federal Assembly speech on occasion of the 700th anniversary celebration of Switzerland on 3 May 1991. In 1992 Widmer was appointed by the Federal Council as a mediator in the conflict over the newly formed Canton of Jura – the "report of the Consultative Commission of the Federal Council and the Kt. Bern and Jura", the so-called Widmer report, was published in 1993.

== Personal life ==
Sigmund Widmer served as colonel of infantry in the Swiss militia army. He published numerous newspaper articles, gave lectures and wrote books on contemporary and historical issues.

Sigmund Widmer died on 11 August 2003 after a short disease at the cantonal hospital of Valais, and was buried at the Fluntern Cemetery.

== Works ==
=== Literature (excerpt) ===
- Zürich. Eine Kulturgeschichte. 13 volumes. Artemis, Zürich 1975–1986, ISBN 3-7608-0399-7.
