= Liutprand =

Liutprand, Italian: Liutprando, is a masculine Germanic dithematic given name of Lombardic origin composed of stems meaning 'people' and 'sword'. Notable people with the name include:

- Liutprand, King of the Lombards ruled from 712 to 744
- Duke Liutprand of Benevento (died after 759)
- Bishop Liutprand of Cremona, (c. 922–972) historian

== See also ==
- Leibbrand, Leibbrandt, Leibrandt, Liebrandt, Liutbrand, Liutprand, Lybrand
