= Leibrandt =

Leibrandt is a German surname, a variant of Leibbrand, derived from a given name. Notable people with the surname include:

- Brandon Leibrandt (born 1992), American baseball player
- Charlie Leibrandt (born 1956), American baseball player

== See also ==
- Leibbrand, Leibbrandt, Leibrandt, Liebrandt, Liutbrand, Liutprand, Lybrand
