= Friedrich Wilhelm Fürst von Hohenzollern =

Prince of Hohenzollern

Friedrich Wilhelm
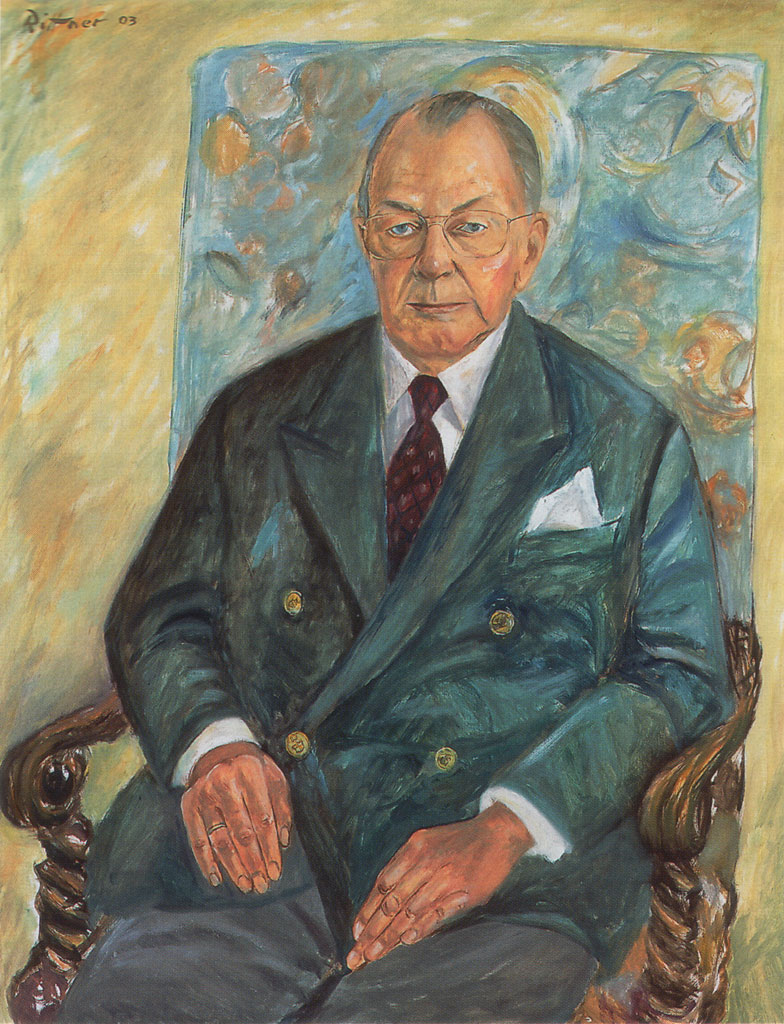
- Portrait by Günter Rittner, 2003

Prince of Hohenzollern
- Tenure: 6 February 1965 – 16 September 2010
- Predecessor: Frederick
- Successor: Karl Friedrich
- Born: 3 February 1924; Schloss Umkirch, Umkirch, Weimar Republic
- Died: 16 September 2010 (aged 86); Sigmaringen, Germany
- Spouse: Princess Margarita of Leiningen (m. 1951; died 1996)
- Issue: Karl Friedrich, Prince of Hohenzollern; Prince Albrecht; Prince Ferdinand
Names
- German: Friedrich Wilhelm Ferdinand Joseph Maria Manuel Georg Meinrad Fidelis Benedikt Michael Hubert Fürst von Hohenzollern
- House: Hohenzollern-Sigmaringen
- Father: Frederick, Prince of Hohenzollern
- Mother: Princess Margarete Karola of Saxony

Friedrich Wilhelm Fürst von Hohenzollern (Friedrich Wilhelm Ferdinand Joseph Maria Manuel Georg Meinrad Fidelis Benedikt Michael Hubert; 3 February 1924 – 16 September 2010) was the head of the Swabian branch of the House of Hohenzollern for over 45 years.

== Biography ==
Friedrich Wilhelm was born at Schloss Umkirch. He was the eldest son of Friedrich, Prince of Hohenzollern (1891–1965) and his wife, Princess Margarete Karola of Saxony (1900–1962), the daughter of the last King of Saxony, Frederick Augustus III. He became the head of the House of Hohenzollern on 6 February 1965, following the death of his father, and remained so until his death on 16 September 2010.

According to the Romanian succession laws of the kingdom's last democratic constitution of 1923, Friedrich Wilhelm's descendants have had a claim to the throne of Romania since 2017, when former King Michael died.

== Marriage and issue ==
Friedrich Wilhelm married Princess Margarita of Leiningen (1932–1996) on 3 February 1951. She was a child of Karl, 6th Prince of Leiningen, and his wife, Grand Duchess Maria Kirillovna of Russia.

They had three sons:

- Karl Friedrich, Prince of Hohenzollern (born 1952), married Katharina Maria "Nina" de Zomer and had four children.
- Prince Albrecht Johannes Hermann Meinrad Hubertus Michael Stephan of Hohenzollern (born 3 August 1954), married Nathalie Rocabado de Viets and had two daughters.
- Prince Ferdinand Maria Fidelis Leopold Meinrad Valentin of Hohenzollern (born 14 February 1960), married Countess Ilona Kálnoky de Köröspatak and had three children.

== Courtesy titles and styles ==
- 3 February 1924 – 22 October 1927: His Serene Highness Prince Friedrich Wilhelm of Hohenzollern
- 22 October 1927 – 6 February 1965: His Highness The Hereditary Prince of Hohenzollern
- 6 February 1965 – 16 September 2010: His Highness The Prince of Hohenzollern

== Honours ==
- Grand Master of the House Order of Hohenzollern
- Knight of the Seraphim (1961)
- Knight Grand Cross of Justice of the Sacred Military Constantinian Order of Saint George.
- Knight of Saint Hubert.
- Officer's Cross (Merit Cross 1st Class) of the Order of Merit of the Federal Republic of Germany.
- Knight of the Black Eagle.
- Knight of the Golden Fleece.
- Bailiff Grand Cross Honour and Devotion of the Sovereign Military Order of Malta
- Grand Cross of the Order of Carol I

Friedrich Wilhelm Fürst von Hohenzollern House of Hohenzollern-Sigmaringen Cadet branch of the House of Hohenzollern Born: 3 February 1924
German nobility
Preceded by Frederick	Prince of Hohenzollern; 6 February 1965 – 16 September 2010	Succeeded by Karl Friedrich, Prince of Hohenzollern
