= District 9 (Zurich) =

Kreis 9 District of the city of Zurich
- District
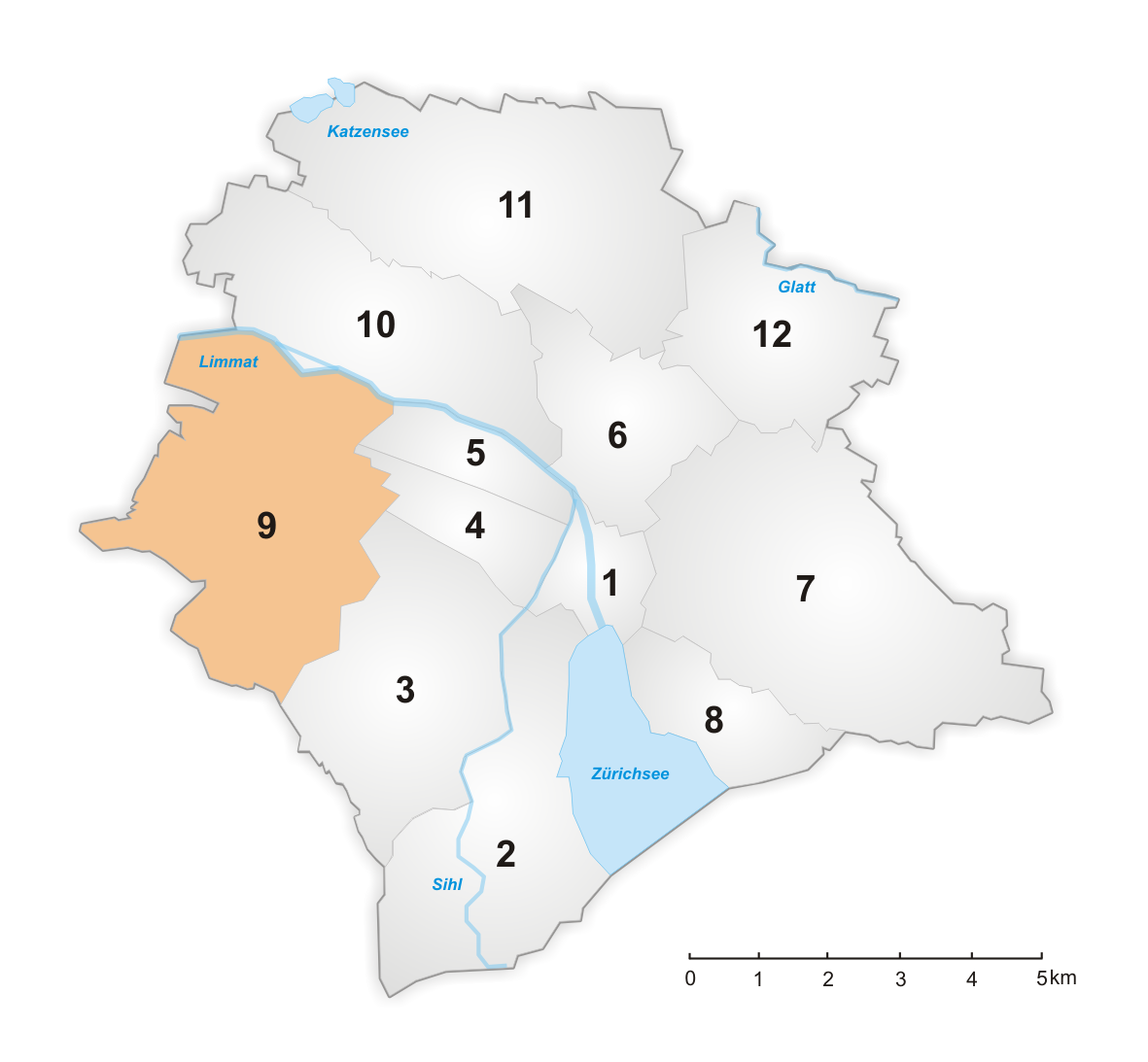
- Coordinates: 47.382°N 8.480°E
- Country: Switzerland
- Canton: Zurich
- City: Zurich

Area
  - Total: 12.1 km^{2} (4.7 sq mi)

Population (31. Dec. 2005)
  - Total: 45,504
  - Density: 3,770/km^{2} (9,800/sq mi)
- District Number: 9
- Quarters: Albisrieden; Altstetten

District 9 is a district in the Swiss city of Zurich.

The district comprises the quarters Albisrieden and Altstetten. Both entities were formerly municipalities of their own, but were incorporated into Zurich in 1934.
