= Karl Friedrich von Hohenzollern =

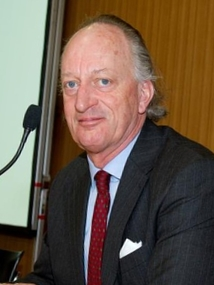
- Karl Friedrich in 2012

Prince of Hohenzollern
- Tenure: 16 September 2010 – present
- Predecessor: Friedrich Wilhelm
- Heir apparent: Alexander
- Born: 20 April 1952 (age 74); Sigmaringen, Baden-Württemberg, West Germany
- Spouse: Countess Alexandra Schenck von Stauffenberg (m. 1985; div. 2010) Katharina Maria de Zomer (m. 2010)
- Issue: 4
Names
- German: Karl Friedrich Emich Meinrad Benedikt Fidelis Maria Michael Gerold
- House: Hohenzollern-Sigmaringen
- Father: Friedrich Wilhelm, Prince of Hohenzollern
- Mother: Princess Margarita of Leiningen

Karl Friedrich Prinz von Hohenzollern (Karl Friedrich Emich Meinrad Benedikt Fidelis Maria Michael Gerold; born 20 April 1952) is the eldest son of the late Friedrich Wilhelm, Prince of Hohenzollern, and Princess Margarita of Leiningen. He became head of the Catholic Swabian branch of the House of Hohenzollern upon his father's death on 16 September 2010.

== Education and career ==
Karl Friedrich is said to have attended the Institut auf dem Rosenberg for his secondary education. He studied business administration at the University of Fribourg, Switzerland.

He is the chairman and sole owner of Unternehmensgruppe Fürst von Hohenzollern (Corporate Group Prince of Hohenzollern), including real estate and forests with 400 employees, and owns a 50% share in the Zollern GmbH und Co. KG (steelworks, transmission technics) with 2800 employees. He is the singer, saxophonist and leader of the music band Royal Groovin'.

He has been a member of the Advisory Board of Südwestbank, a member of the Advisory Board of Landesbank Baden-Württemberg (LBBW) since 2007 and a member of the Southwest Regional Advisory Board of Commerzbank since 2008.

According to the suspended 1938 Constitution of Romania, Karl Friedrich is heir to the throne since 2017, upon the death of former King Michael. However, in a 2009 interview, he stated that he had no interest in the defunct Romanian throne.

== Marriage and children ==
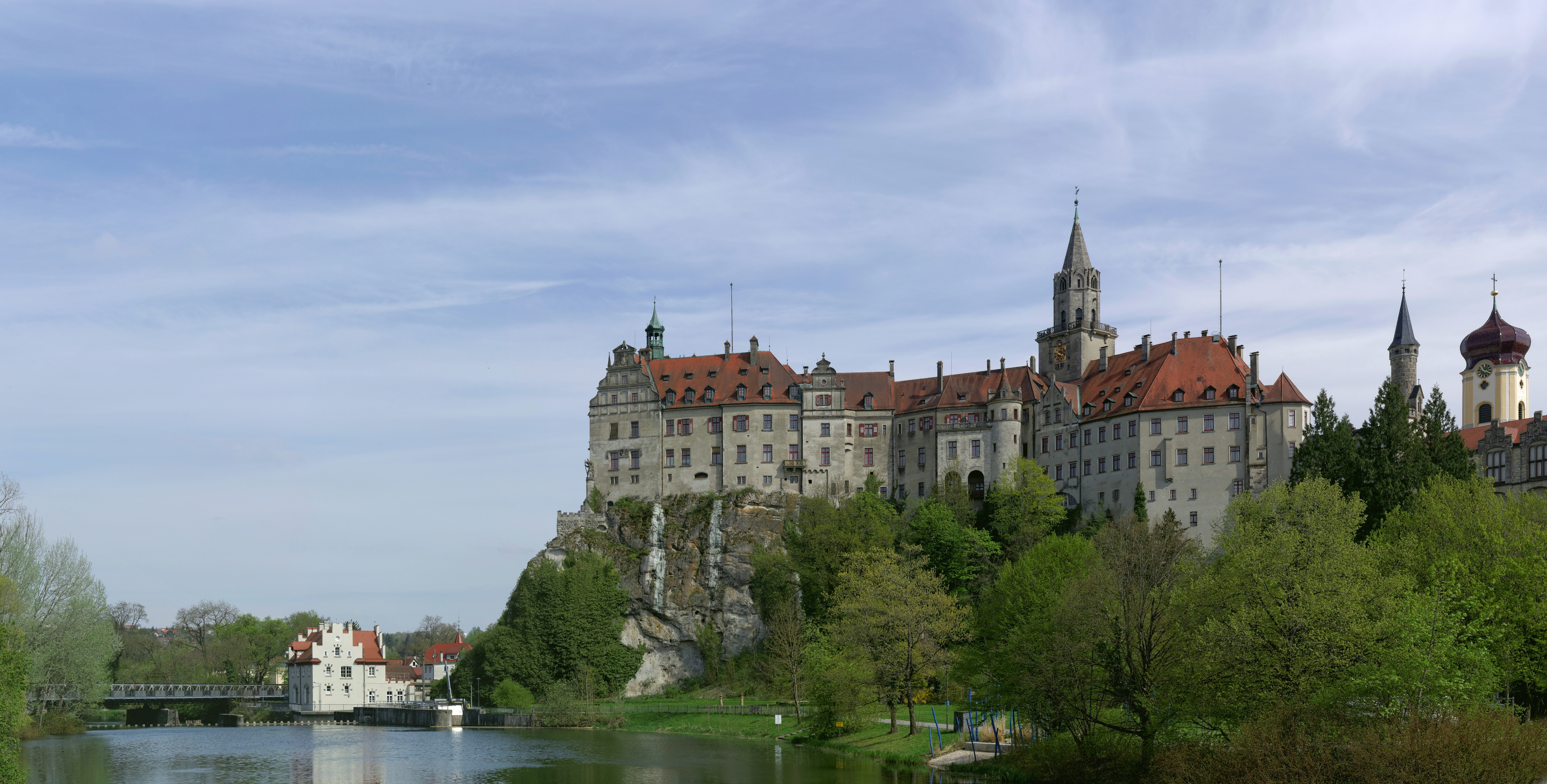
Sigmaringen Castle

Karl Friedrich married Alexandra Gräfin Schenk von Stauffenberg on 17 May 1985 in the Beuron Archabbey, Baden-Württemberg. They were divorced on 21 January 2010, in Sigmaringen. They have four children.

On 17 July 2010, Karl Friedrich married for the second time, to Katharina Maria "Nina" de Zomer (born 1959).

== Residences ==
Karl Friedrich lives on his hunting estate Josefslust House, whereas the nearby hunting lodge is used by his brother Albrecht (born 1954) and the nearby Krauchenwies estate by his ex-wife, Princess Alexandra. Furthermore, he owns Umkirch Castle and, as head of the princely Sigmaringen branch of the house of Hohenzollern, has a one-third ownership share in Hohenzollern Castle, together with the head of the royal branch, Georg Friedrich, Prince of Prussia.

He has his offices at Sigmaringen Castle which is also open to the public and is used for family weddings and other ceremonial occasions.

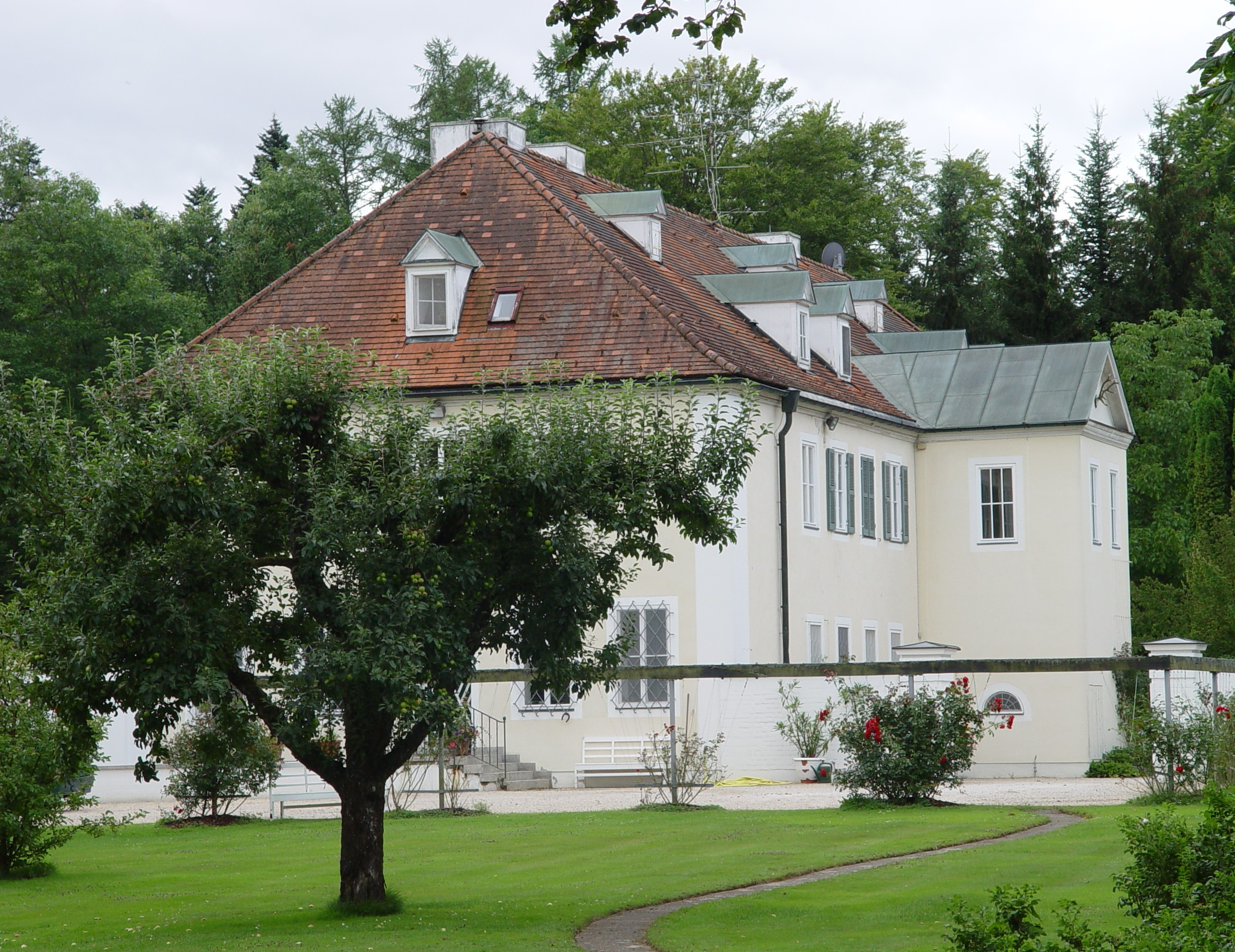
Josefslust House

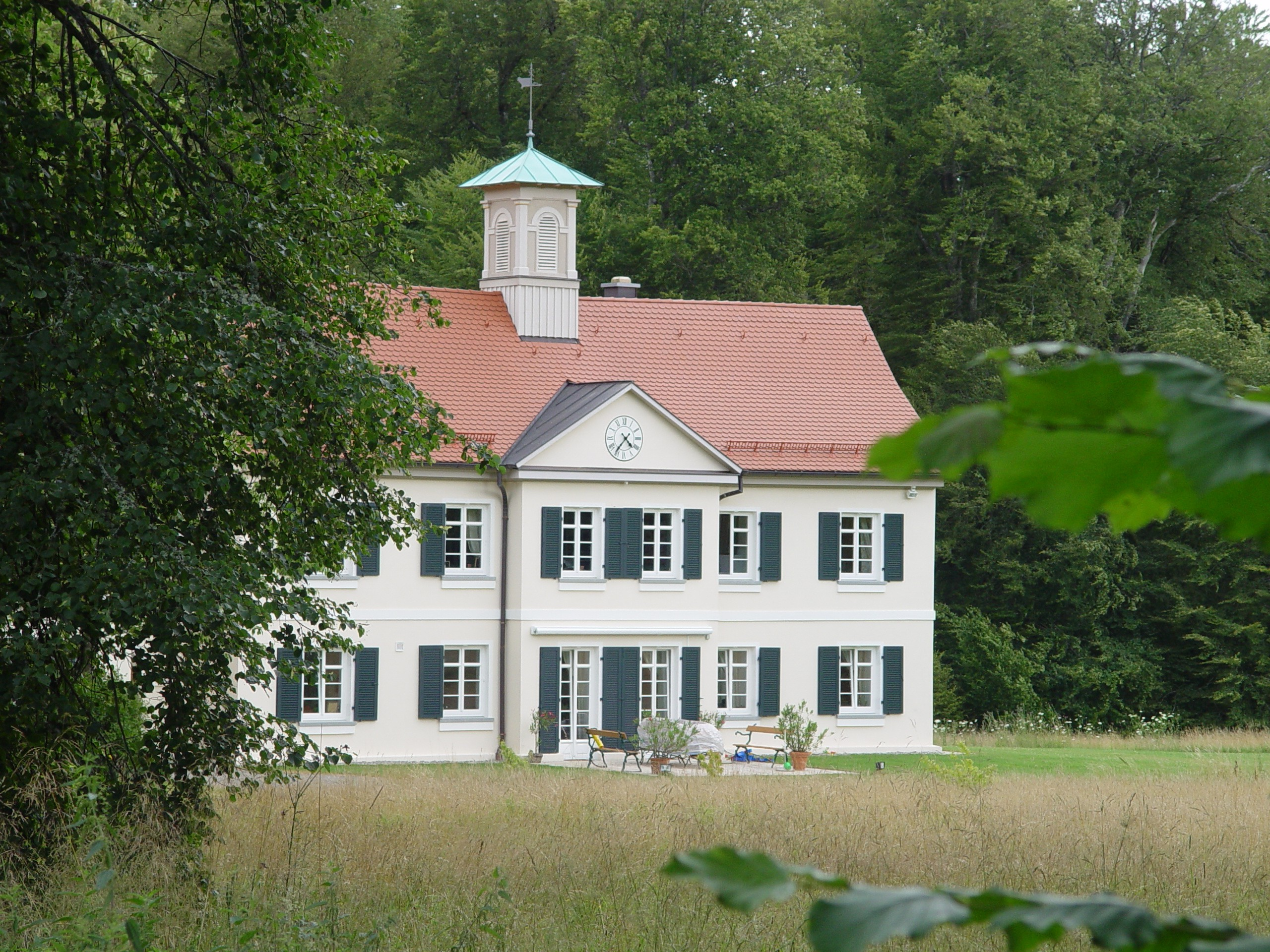
Josefslust Hunting Lodge

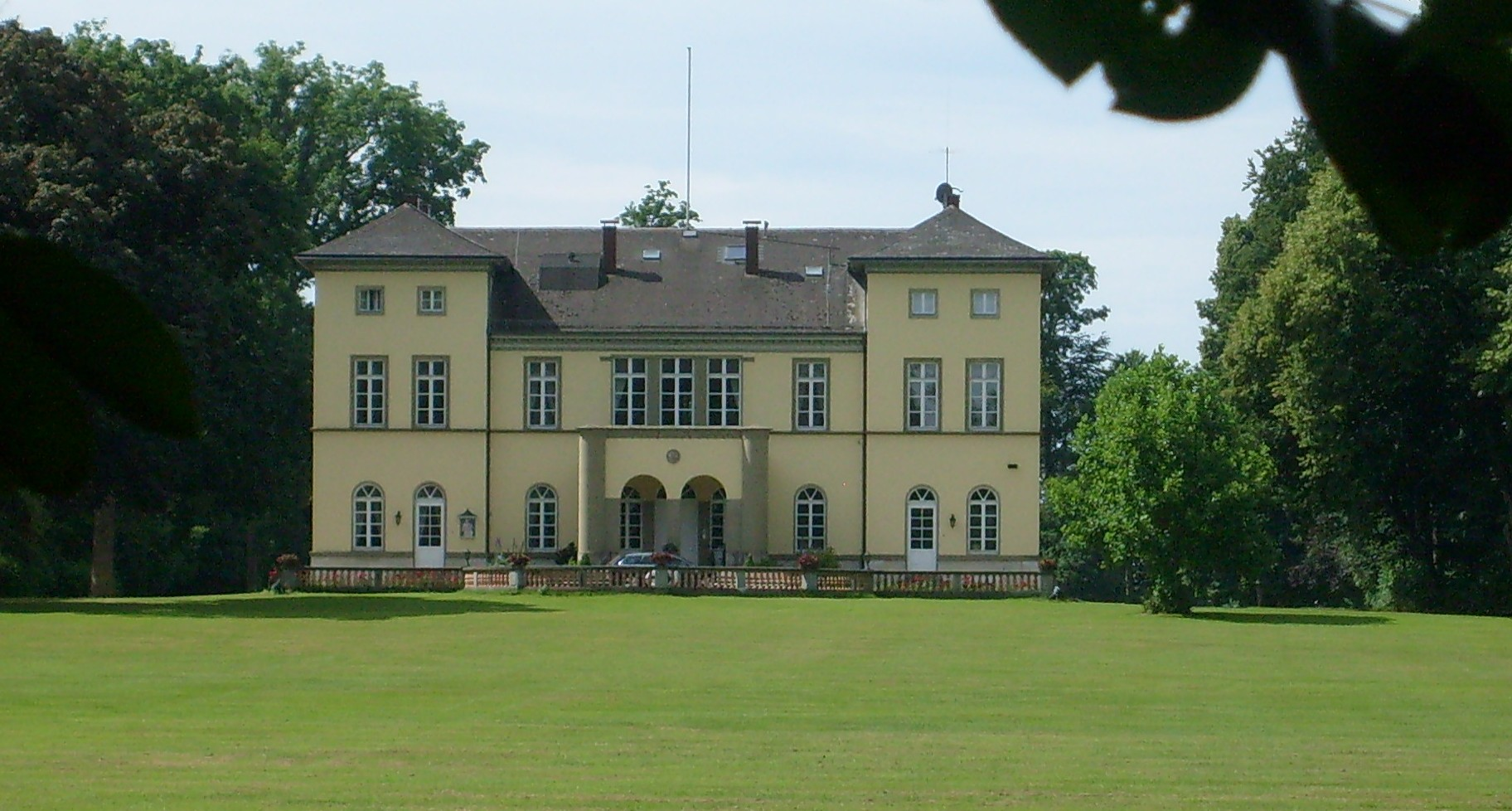
Krauchenwies House

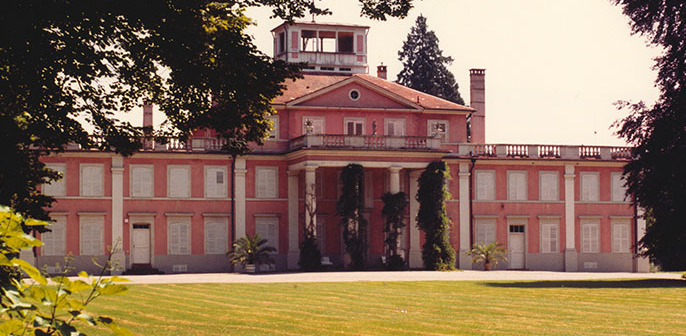
Umkirch Castle

== Discography ==
- Jive and Candies (2003, Charly and the Jivemates)
- Jump for Joy (2007, Charly and the Jivemates)
- Just Friends (2010, with Frieder Berlin Trio)

Karl Friedrich von Hohenzollern House of Hohenzollern Born: 20 April 1952
German nobility
Preceded by Prince Friedrich Wilhelm	Prince of Hohenzollern; 16 September 2010 – present	Incumbent; Heir: Alexander, Hereditary Prince of Hohenzollern
