= Altstetten (Zurich) =

- Quarter
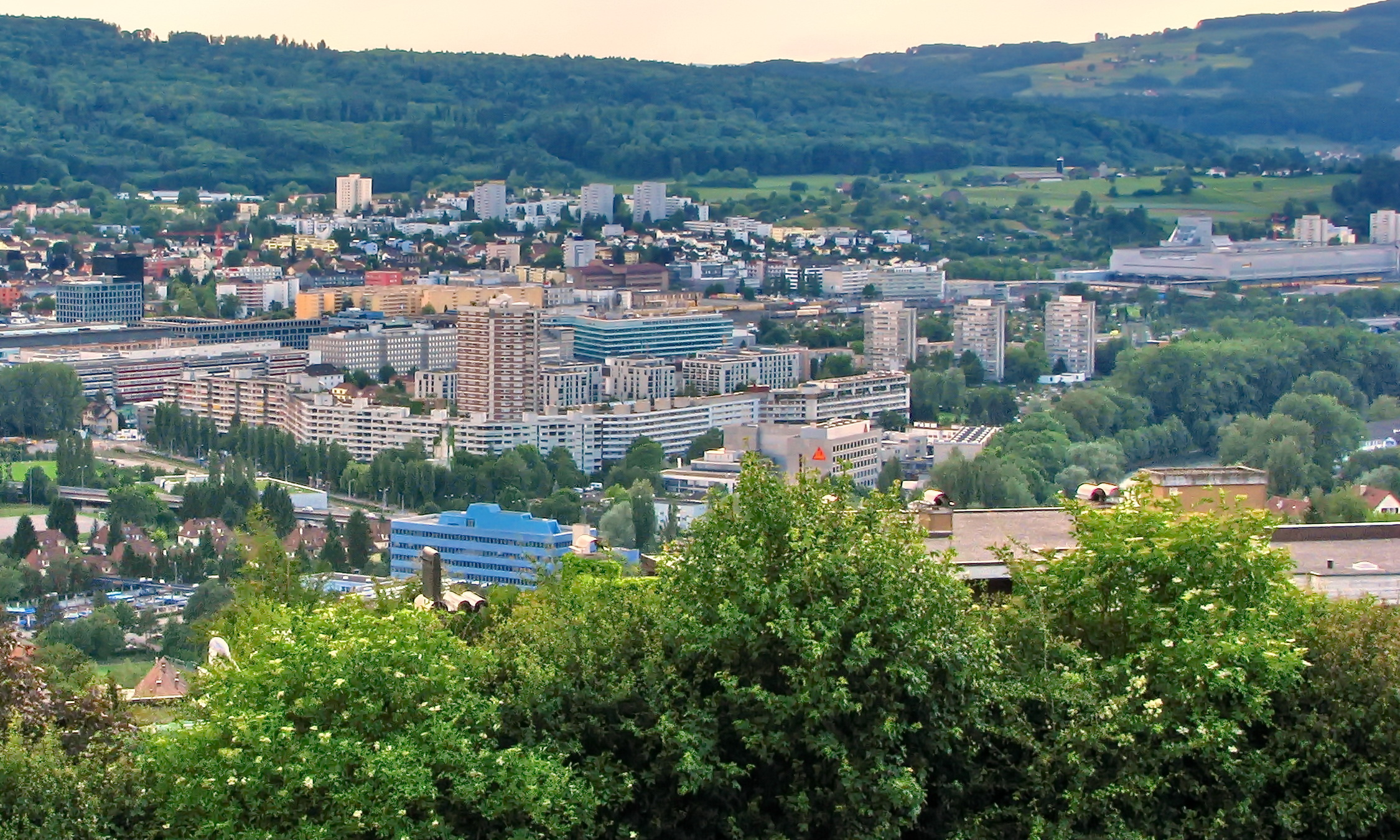
- Altstetten as seen from Käferberg-Waidberg

- Flag Coat of arms

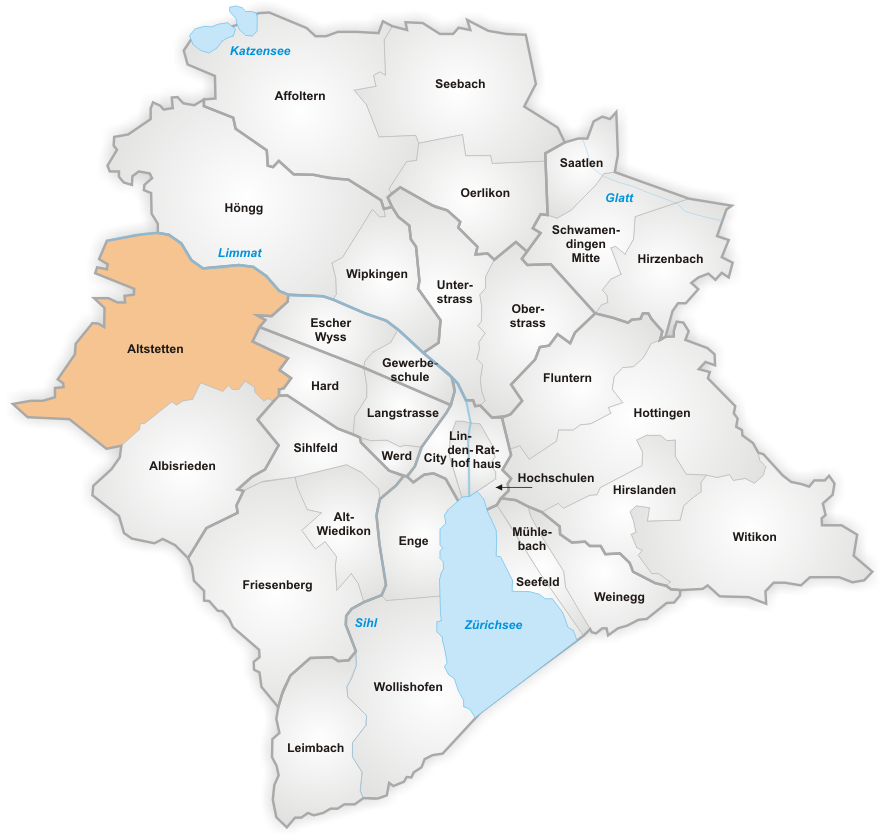
- The quarter of Altstetten in Zurich
- Coordinates: 47.384969°N 8.477175°E
- Country: Switzerland
- Canton: Zurich
- City: Zurich
- District: 9

Altstetten is a quarter in district 9 of the city of Zurich in Switzerland. It was formerly a municipality in its own right, but was incorporated into Zurich in 1934.

== History ==
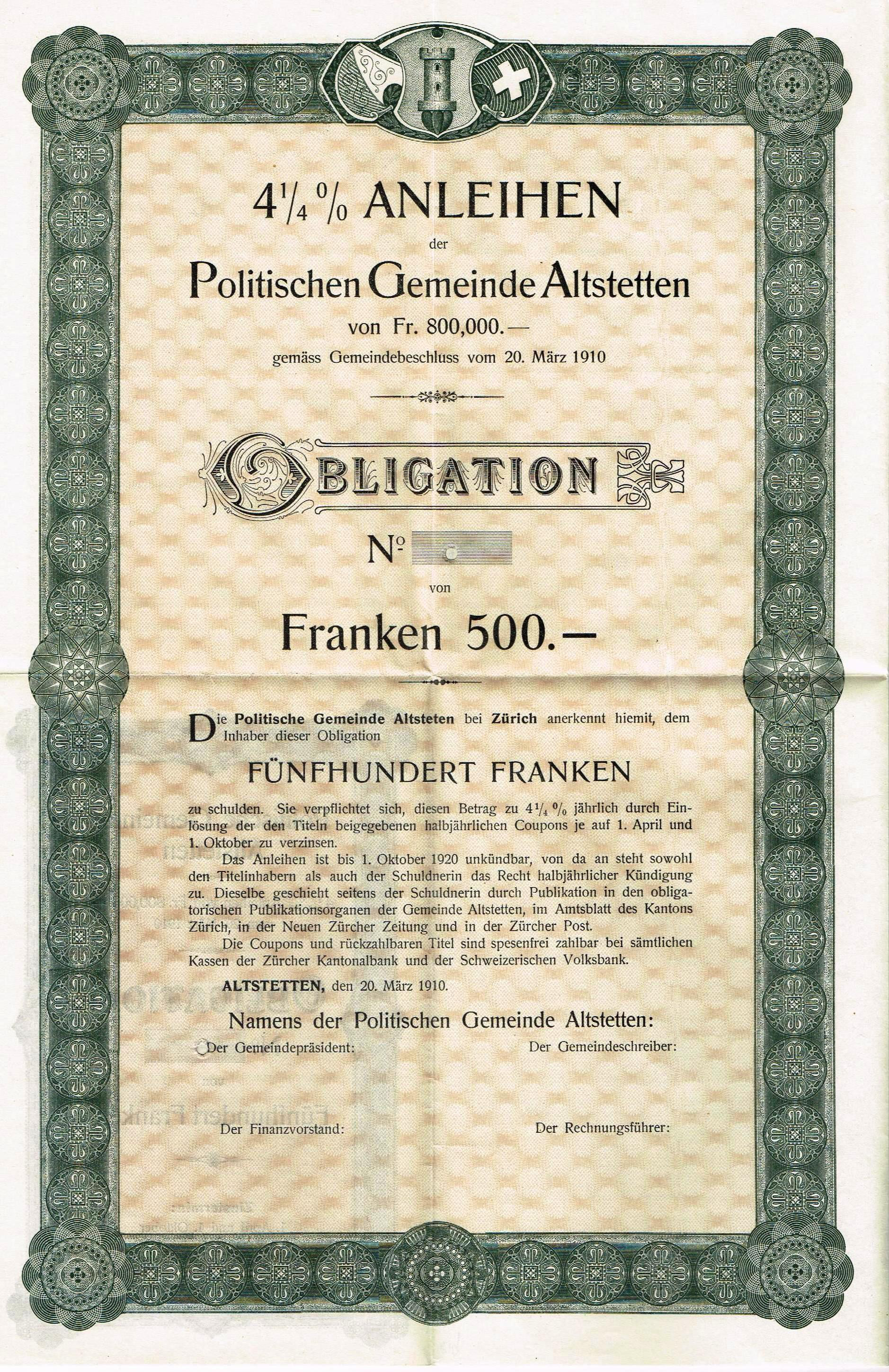
Bond of the Politischen Gemeinde Altstetten, issued 20 March 1910

Aerial view (1965)

Altstetten is first mentioned in 1249, at which time a distinction was made between in Altstettin superiori and in villa Altstetin Inferiori. Excavations have found remains probably from the late Bronze Age (1000-800 BC), together with those of a Roman villa.

In 1847, the Swiss Northern Railway opened Switzerland's first domestic railway line between Zurich and Baden. The line passed through Altstetten, and a station was provided. Over time, the line became the principal rail route between Zurich and northern and western Switzerland. In 1864, a second line, to Zug via Affoltern am Albis, made a junction with the first just west of Altstetten railway station. In 1907, the Swiss Federal Railway, who had taken over both lines, opened a workshop in Altstetten.

In 1900, the Limmattal tramway opened an interurban electric tramway through Altstetten, connecting with Zurich's city trams at Letzigraben, which then formed the boundary between Zurich and Altstetten. Beyond Altstetten, the tramway continued to Schlieren, Dietikon and Weiningen. In 1931, the line was taken over by the Städtische Strassenbahn Zürich, operators of Zurich's city trams, by which time the line had been cut back to Schlieren. In the late 1950s the line was further cut back to Farbhof in the west of Altstetten, and it now forms part of the city's tram route 2.

The former municipality of Altstetten was incorporated into the city of Zurich in 1934. The neighbouring municipality of Albisrieden was incorporated at the same time, and together they form district 9 of the city.

In 1967 Ernst Sieber became the parish priest of Zürich-Altstetten where he worked until his retirement as pastor in 1992.

== Transportation ==
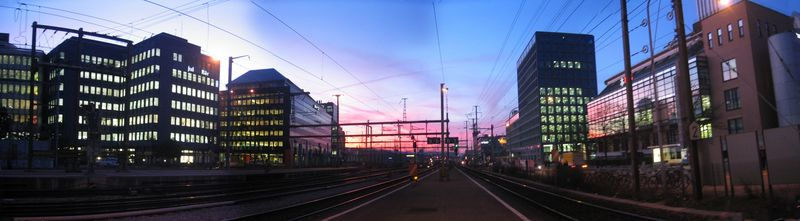
Alstetten station at sundown

Zurich Altstetten railway station is a nodal point where the Zurich S-Bahn, Zurich trams, Zurich trolleybuses and Zurich buses all connect. The station is served by S-Bahn lines S5, S11, S12, S14, S19 and S42, providing frequent services to Zürich Hauptbahnhof with a ride time only a few minutes. Tram route 4 serves a terminus on the northern side of the station, whilst trolleybus route 31 passes the south side of the station. Bus routes 78, 80, 89 and 95 also serve the south side of the station, whilst routes 304, 307 and 308 terminate at the north side.

Some 1.25 km (0.78 mi) south of the station, tram route 2 operates through the main Badenerstrasse street, connecting with bus routes 35, 78 and 80 at Lindenplatz stop. About 700 m (0.43 mi) to the west of Lindenplatz, tram route 2 terminates at Farbhof, where it connects with trolleybus 31 and buses 35, 78 and 303.

Future plans involve the construction of the Limmattal light rail line, a new metre gauge tram line that will link Altstetten station with communities further west in the valley of the Limmat, along a route similar to that of the long abandoned Limmattal-Strassenbahn. It is planned that the line will be partially opened by 2020 and will connect to the city tram system at Altstetten station, with the possibility of extending city tram service over the Limmattalbahn as far as Schlieren.
