= Annemarie Leibbrand-Wettley =

German medical historian (1913–1996)

- Born: 12 June 1913
- Died: 1996 (aged 82–83)
- Known for: Medical history

Annemarie Leibbrand-Wettley (12 June 1913 – 1996) was a German medical historian. She wrote her medical dissertation in 1939 and a doctoral dissertation in the 1950s. Between 1955 and 1973 she and Werner Leibbrand regularly taught at Sorbonne in Paris. She married Werner Leibbrand 1962 with whom she also co-authored several major works.

== Works ==
- Leibbrand-Wettley, Annemarie; Werner Leibbrand (1972). Formen des Eros: Kultur- und Geistesgeschichte der Liebe. K. Alber. ISBN 978-3-495-47256-9.
- Leibbrand, Werner; Annemarie Wettley (1961). Der Wahnsinn: Geschichte der abendländischen Psychopathologie. K. Alber.
- Wettley, Annemarie; Werner Leibbrand (1959). Von der "Psychopathia sexualis" zur Sexualwissenschaft. Stuttgart: Enke.
- Wettley, Annemarie: Vertauschbares Dasein. Heidelberg: Lambert Schneider 1947

== Sources ==
- "Werner Leibbrand as contemporary witness". Max-Planck-Institut für Psychiatrie, München. Archived from the original on 29 June 2009.
- Wettley, Annemarie (1939). Die Eklampsie und Präeklampsie unter bes. Berücks. d. chronisch verlaufenden Fälle. OCLC 71876466.
