= Kurt Leibbrand =

German engineer (1914–1985)

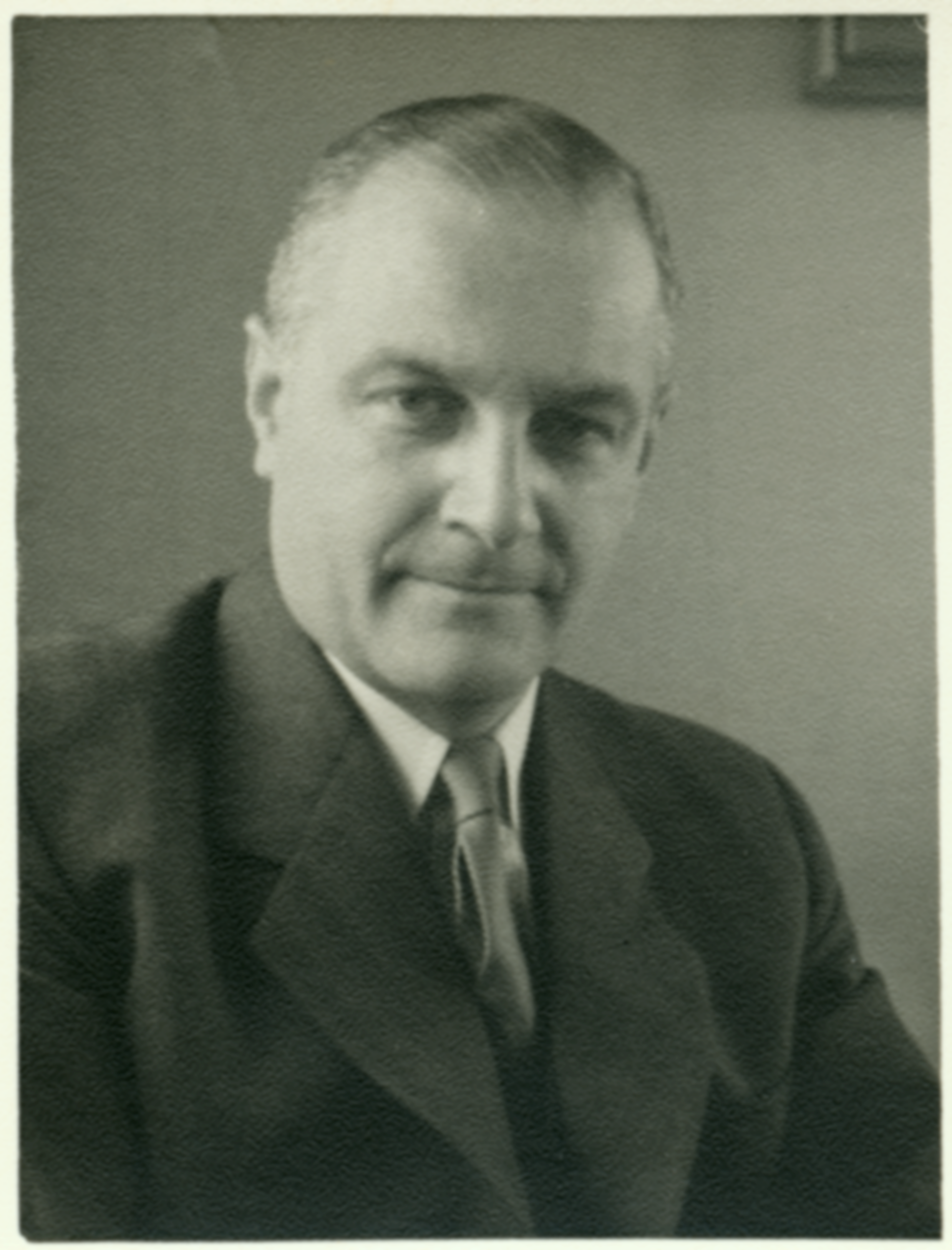
- Portrait of Kurt Gustav Adolf Max Leibbrand
- Born: 19 May 1914; Schmargendorf
- Died: 21 July 1985 (aged 71); São Domingos do Maranhão
- Resting place: São Domingos do Maranhão
- Education: Heinrich von Kleist Gymnasium, Berlin
- Alma mater: University of Stuttgart and Technische Universität Berlin
- Spouse: Lotte Geyer married to 1939
- Children: one daughter, four sons
- Parent(s): Alice née Marty and Dr. Ing. E.h. Max Leibbrand

Kurt Gustav Adolf Max Leibbrand (1914-1985) was a German civil engineer, professor, and consultant transport engineer. In July 1961, he was arrested and charged with murder for the deaths of 26 unarmed Italian volunteers who were shot during the German retreat from France in August 1944, allegedly on the regimental orders he issued. Although the court only found him culpable for manslaughter, he was not sentenced because the manslaughter verdict was time-barred. His arrest lead to his resignation as a professor of railway and transport engineering at ETH Zürich.

== Professional life ==
- From 1937 to 1950 he was with German Railways, later Councillor.
- From 1950 to 1963 he was Professor at the ETH Zurich.
- From 1963 to 1977 he worked in infrastructure consulting engineering in Frankfurt.
- From 1977 to 1979 he was Professor at the Institute of technology, Instituto Militar de Engenharia, Rio de Janeiro.
- From 1979 to 1980 he was Consultant to the Press of the Empresa Brasileira de Transportes Urbanos (Ministry of Transport (Brazil)).
- From 1980 to 1985 he was an infrastructure consulting engineer Stuttgart.

He undertook planning and consulting work in 22 countries in Europe, Turkey, Venezuela, Chile, Spain, Portugal.

Leibbrand has been considered one of the most influential post-war German transport engineers.

== Arrest for war crimes ==
On July 24, 1961 Leibbrand was arrested on behalf of the Stuttgart District Court at Frankfurt airport, because of a command he issued as a lieutenant in August 1944 during World War II, in Orange, Vaucluse near Avignon, which led to 28 Italian volunteers of the 6th Company of the Pioneer Regiment of the 19th Army being shot down with machine guns after having mutinied when the company withdrew. A company officer ordered the unsuspecting "Hiwis" in the middle of the night to enter a small forest meadow, where they were shot. Six of them were able to escape in the dark. According to Der Spiegel, 26 were killed and five seriously injured.

Citing a lack of evidence, the Stuttgart jury released Leibbrand on 2 October 1962 from the charge of murder. Then he returned to Zurich, but not to the chair from which he was on leave. The Federal Court of Justice in Karlsruhe overturned the verdict and dismissed the case for reassessment to the Stuttgart court. On January 10, 1966 Leibbrand stood for the second time in Stuttgart in court. Despite the charge of murder, his deed was counted as manslaughter and set the procedure for prescription.

== Awards ==
- 1935: Boissonnet Prize
- 1939: Prize of German Minister of Transport
