= São Domingos do Maranhão =

Coordinates: 5°42′S 44°22′W

- Municipality
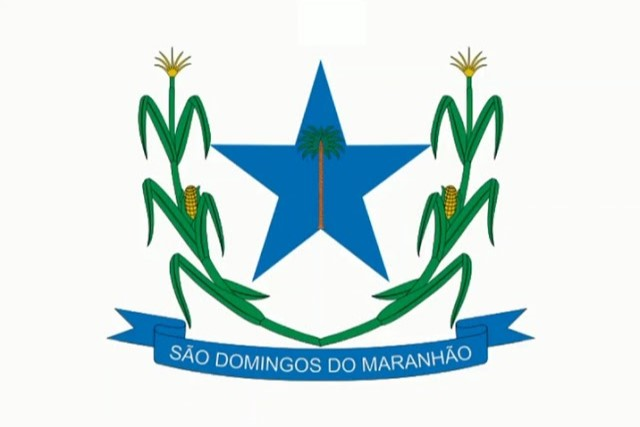
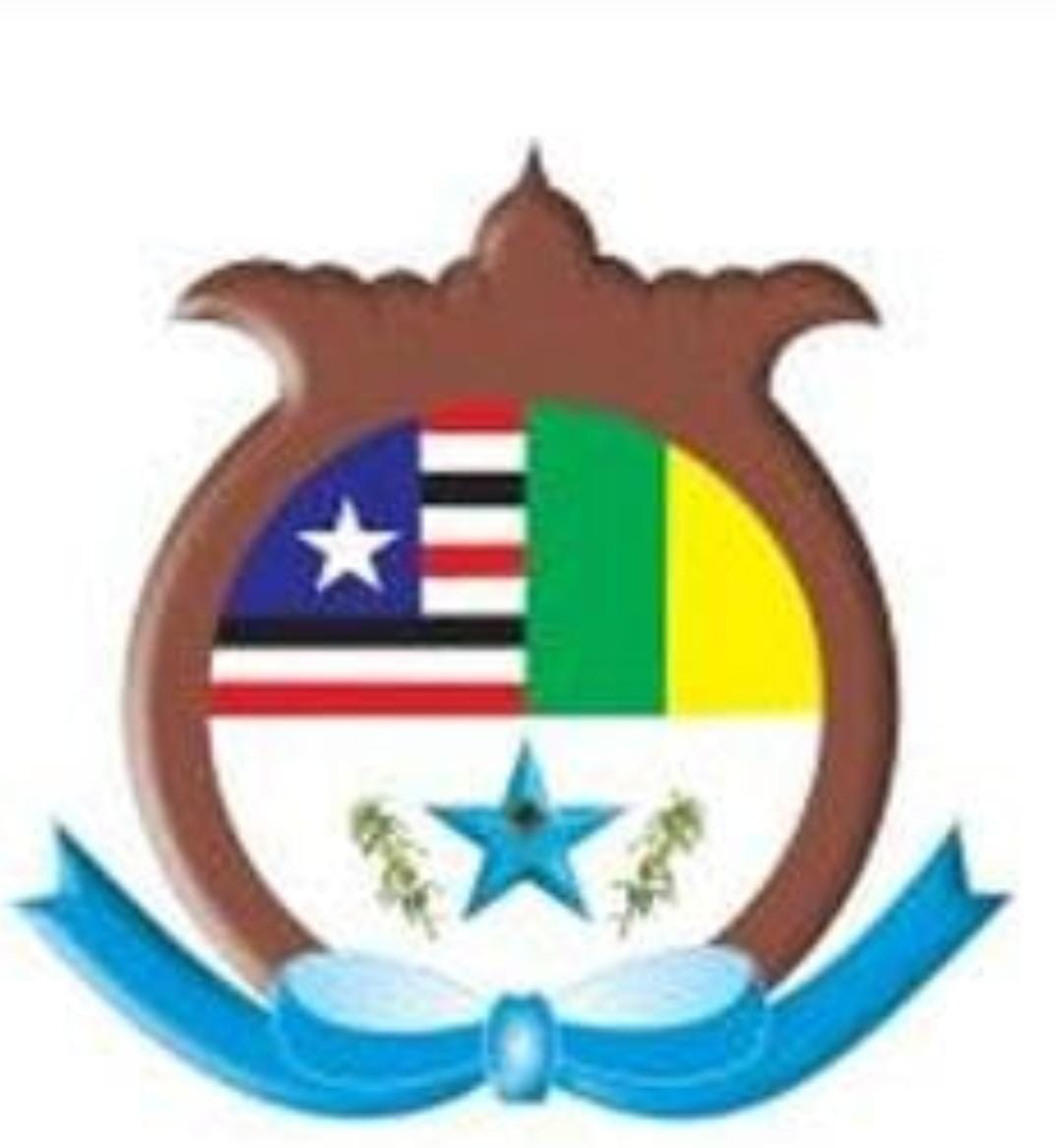
- Flag Coat of arms
- Interactive map of São Domingos do Maranhão
- Country: Brazil
- Region: Nordeste
- State: Maranhão
- Mesoregion: Centro Maranhense

Population (2020)
  - Total: 34,384
- Time zone: UTC−3 (BRT)

São Domingos do Maranhão is a municipality in the state of Maranhão in the Northeast region of Brazil.

== See also ==
- List of municipalities in Maranhão
