= Werner Leibbrand =

German psychiatrist and medical historian

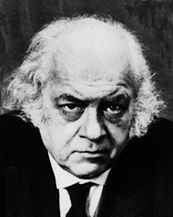
- Werner Leibbrand
- Born: 1896; Berlin
- Died: 1974 (aged 77–78)
- Known for: Medical history, Psychiatry

Werner Leibbrand (1896–1974) was a German psychiatrist and medical historian. He showed an early talent and affection for music and languages. As a young man he considered a career as a pianist, and he spoke French, Italian, Spanish, Russian, and Yiddish. His father, however, influenced him to study medicine and philosophy. After becoming a medical doctor, he specialized in psychiatry. In the crisis years around 1930, he joined Verein Sozialistischer Ärzte (The Association of Socialist Doctors) and co-founded a center for drug addicts. He fell into disgrace and was persecuted by the Nazis.

After World War II, he became director of the psychiatric clinic in Erlangen. In 1947, Leibbrand was appointed to a tenured professorship in the history of medicine at the University of Erlangen. He moved to the Ludwig-Maximilians-Universität München and was in 1958 appointed regular associate professor there, in 1969 professor emeritus. Between 1955 and 1973, he and Annemarie Wettley regularly taught at the Sorbonne in Paris.

He married three times: first to a singer, whom he divorced in 1932; he then married Margarete Bergius (1885–1949); and in 1962, he married Annemarie Wettley (Annemarie Leibbrand-Wettley) (1913–1996) with whom he co-authored several major works.

== Major works ==
- Leibbrand, Werner (1937). Romantische Medizin. H. Goverts.
- Leibbrand-Wettley, Annemarie; Werner Leibbrand (1972). Formen des Eros: Kultur- und Geistesgeschichte der Liebe. K. Alber. ISBN 978-3-495-47256-9.
- Leibbrand, Werner; Annemarie Wettley (1961). Der Wahnsinn: Geschichte der abendländischen Psychopathologie. K. Alber.
- Wettley, Annemarie; Werner Leibbrand (1959). Von der "Psychopathia sexualis" zur Sexualwissenschaft. Stuttgart: Enke.

== Awards ==
- Palmes Académiques, the highest academic award of the French Republic in 1971

== Sources ==
- "Werner Leibbrand as contemporary witness". Max-Planck-Institut für Psychiatrie, München. Archived from the original on 29 June 2009.
- anon. (1967). ... Festschrift fur Werner Leibbrand...
- Eilert, P; Schäfer C (1974). "Werner Leibbrand--obituary". Med Monatsschr. 28 (12): 559–562. PMID 4615255.
- Kudlien, F (1986). "Werner Leibbrand als Zeitzeuge : Ein ärztlicher Gegner des Nationalsozialismus im Dritten Reich". Medizinhistorisches Journal. 21 (3–4). Steiner Verlag, Stuttgart: 332–352. PMID 11637393.
- Moreno, Jonathan D. (2001). Undue risk: secret state experiments on humans. Routledge. ISBN 978-0-415-92835-9.
- Unschuld, Paul U; Matthias M. Weber; Wolfgang G. Locher (2005). Werner Leibbrand (1896-1974): "--ich weiss, dass ich mehr tun muss, als nur ein Arzt zu sein--". Zuckschwerdt. ISBN 978-3-88603-882-4.
