= Albisrieden =

Quarter of Zurich, Switzerland

- Quarter
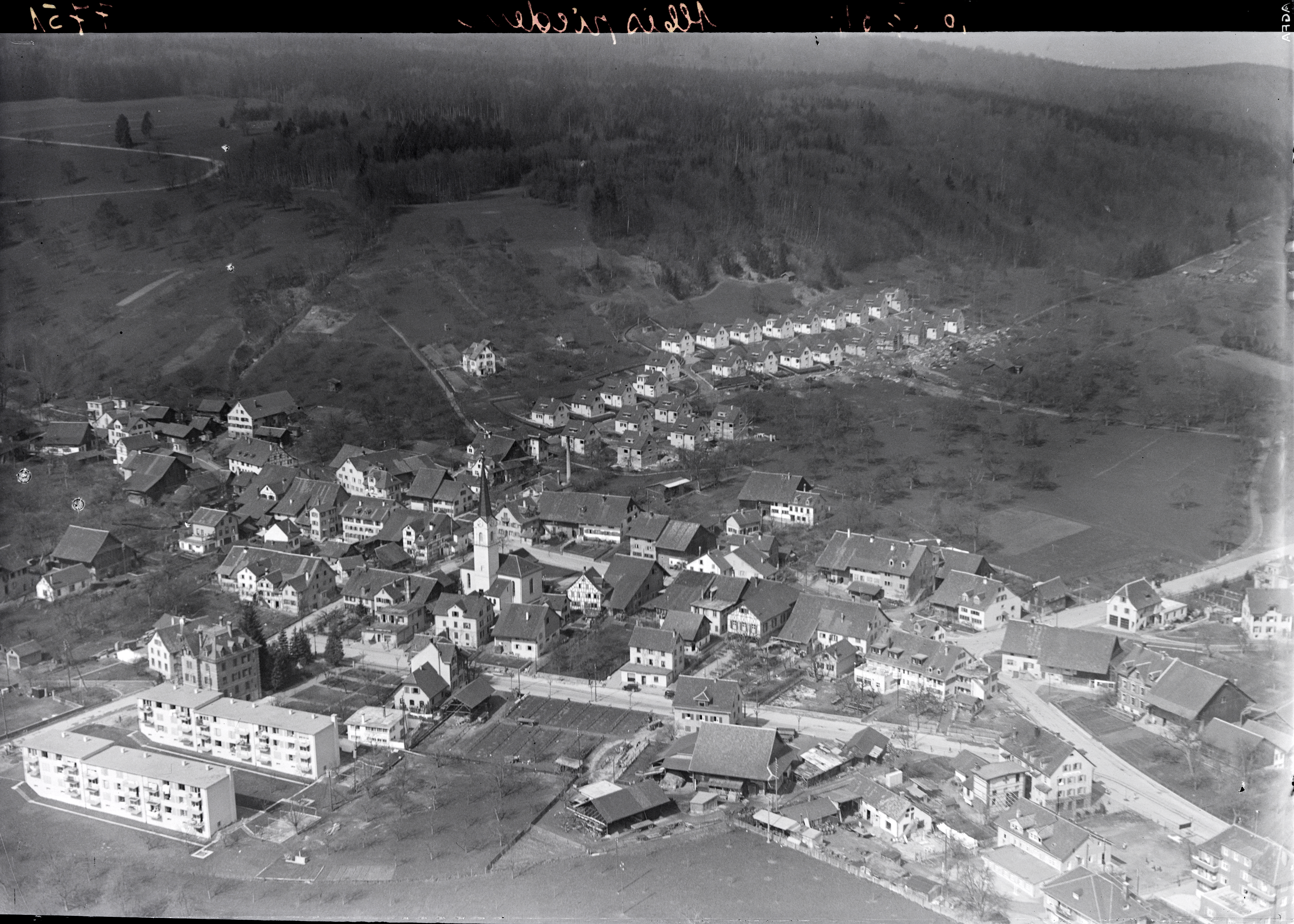
- Aerial view by Walter Mittelholzer (1934)

- Flag Coat of arms

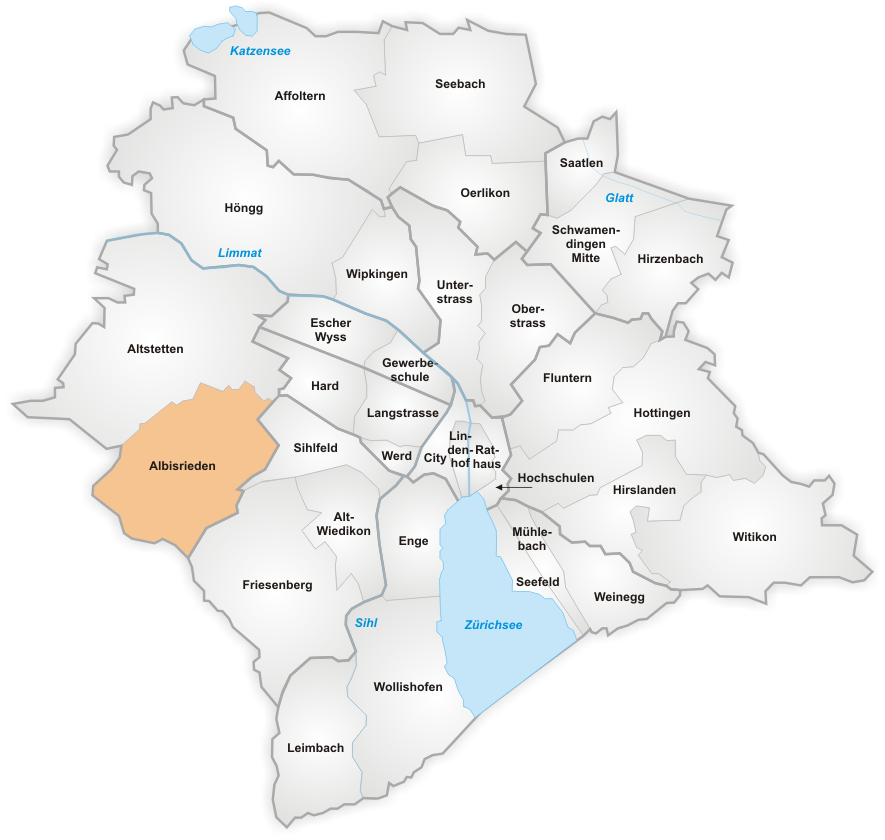
- The quarter of Albisrieden in Zurich
- Coordinates: 47°22′31″N 8°29′05″E
- Country: Switzerland
- Canton: Zurich
- City: Zurich
- District: 9

Albisrieden is a quarter in the district 9 in Zürich.

It was formerly a municipality of its own, having been incorporated into Zürich in 1934.

As of 2025, the quarter has a population of 23,877 distributed on an area of 4.615 km^{2} (1.782 sq mi).

== Churches ==
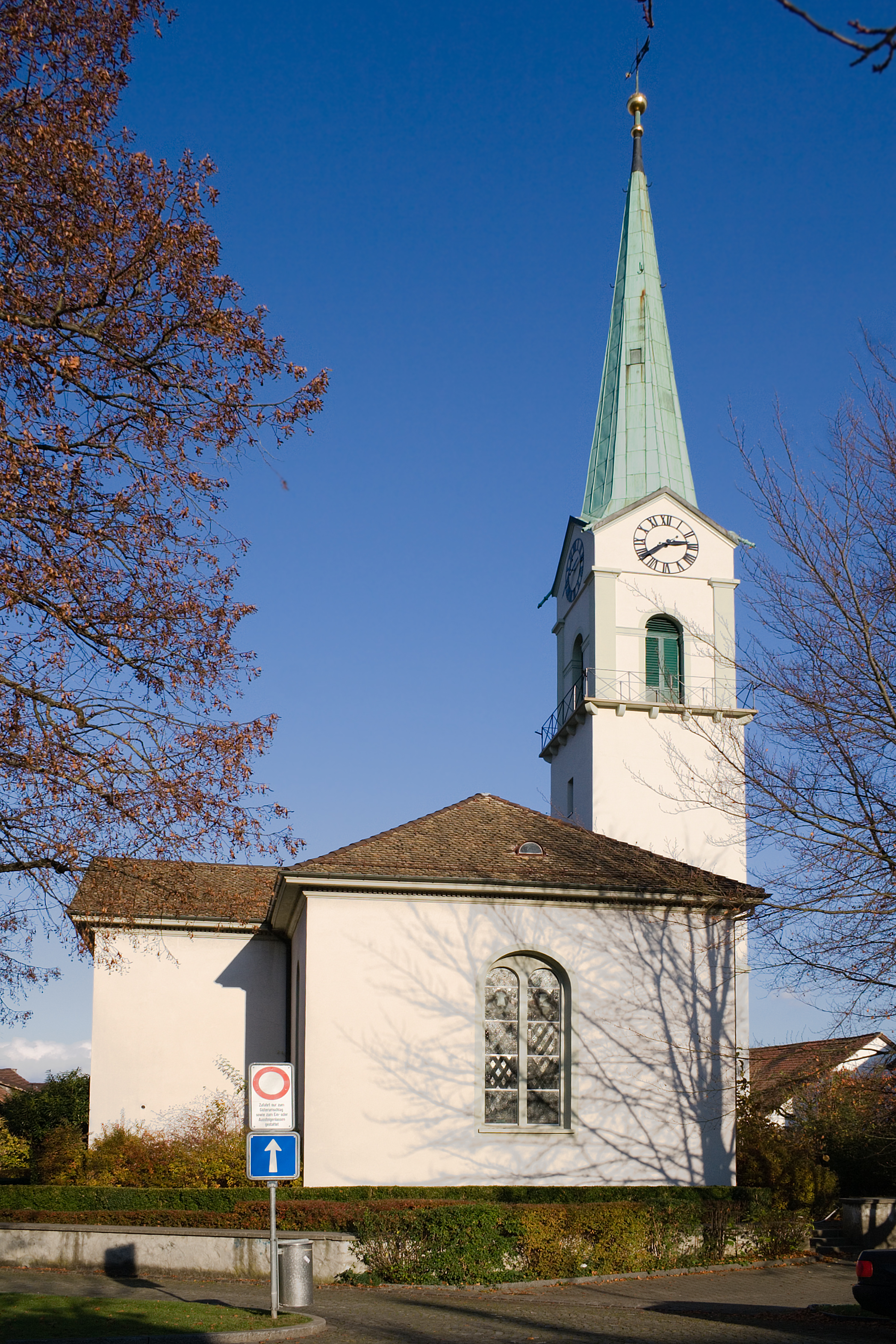
so called Alte Kirche (old church)

Albisrieden has two Evangelical Reformed Churches that are part of the Canton of Zürich.

The Alte Kirche Albisrieden was built between 1816 and 1818, stands in centre of the village and was constructed according to plans by Hans Conrad Stadler (1788–1846).

The Neue Kirche Albisrieden was built between 1949 and 1951 and is located 800 meters from the Alte Kirche. This church was constructed according to plans by the architect Hans Martin von Meyenburg (1915–1995).

St. Konrad is Albisrieden's Roman Catholic church, was constructed between 1953 and 1955 according to plans by the architects Ferdinand Pfammatter und Walter Rieger.
