= Order of Amarante =

Chivalric order

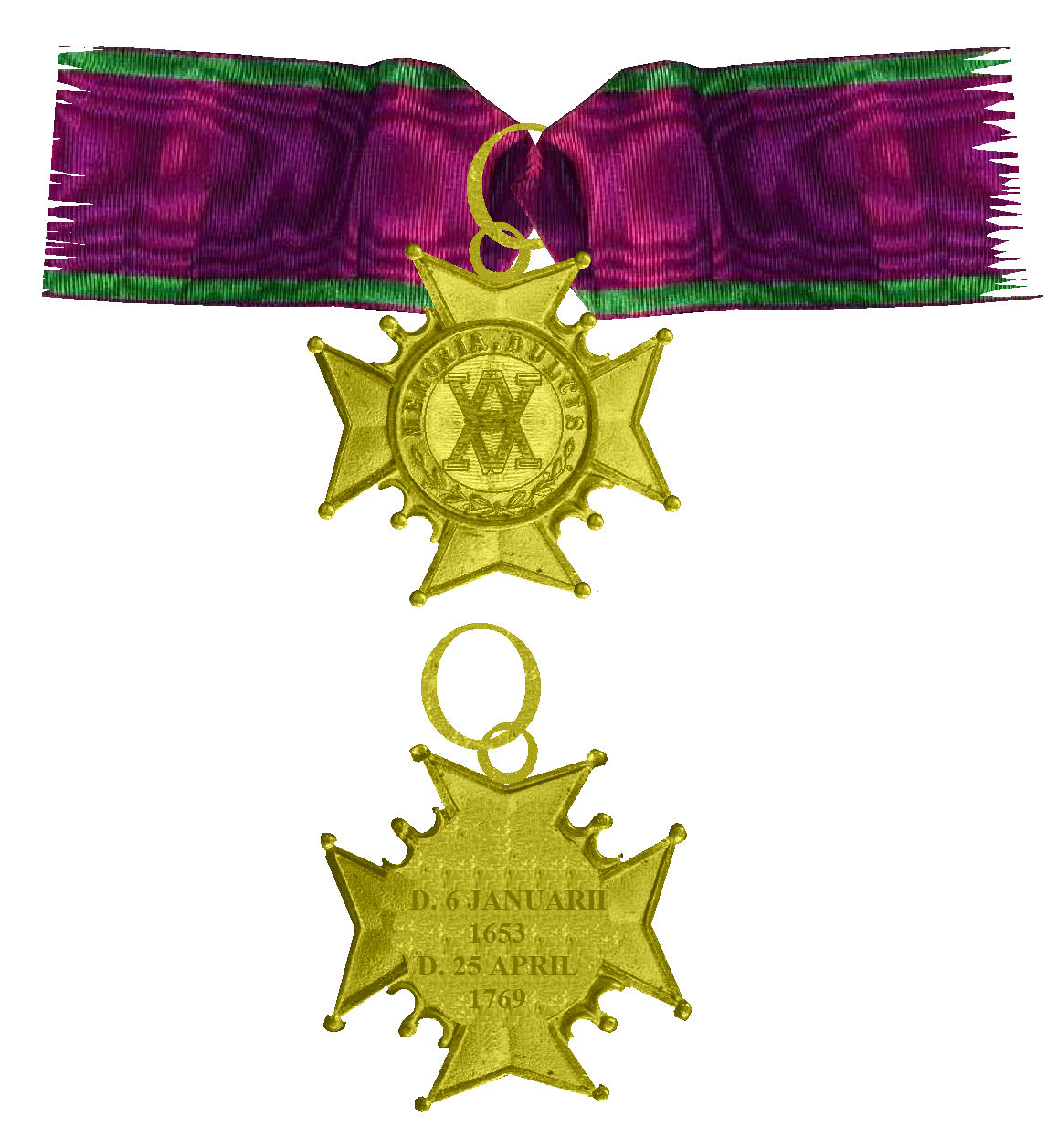
- Insignia of the order (obverse and reverse)

Awarded by Christina of Sweden
- Type: Chivalric order in one class
- Established: January 6, 1653
- Motto: Dolce Memoria
- Status: Disestablished
- Grades: Knight

Statistics
- Total inductees: 15
- Order of Amarante ribbon

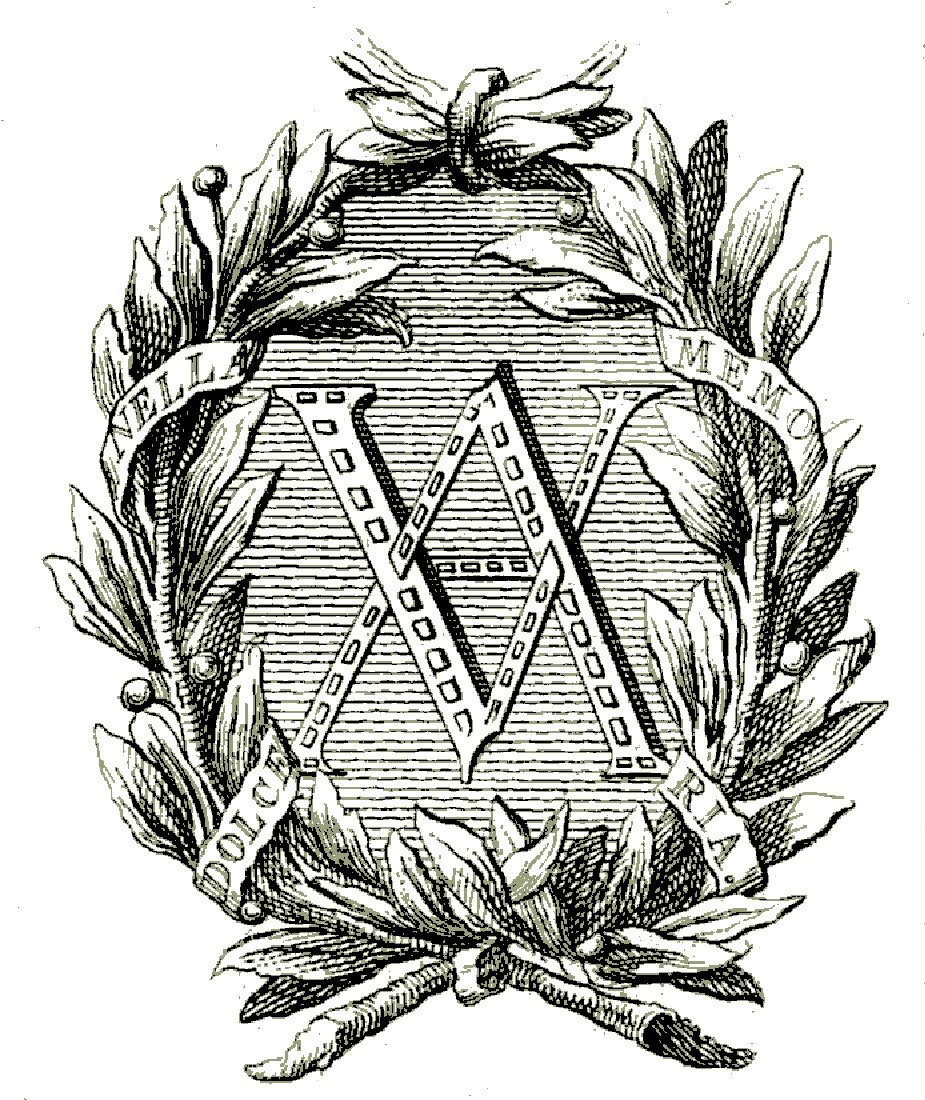
Emblem of the Order of Amarante

The Order of Amarante, or Amarante Order (French: La frairie d'Amarante; Swedish: Amaranterorden), was a fraternal order of Swedish knights, founded in 1653 by Queen Christina of Sweden at Epiphany. The Order was established in honor and memory of her meetings with the Spanish ambassador Antonio Pimentel de Prado, who originated from Amarante, Portugal. He was also the first to receive the award. The Order was limited to 15 knights, who had to remain unmarried.

Order members were those "who participated in [the Queen's] most intimate pleasures." Among the original members were (besides the Spanish ambassador) the French ambassador Pierre Chanut, Venetian ambassador Francesco Morosini, Denmark's national steward Corfitz Ulfeldt, Poland's crown chancellor Hieronim Radziejowski, chamberlain Christoph Delphicus zu Dohna, Jacob De la Gardie, Magnus Gabriel De la Gardie and Clas Tott (1630–1674). The Order was also awarded to Władysław IV Vasa, Elector John George of Saxony, and Frederick, Landgrave of Hesse-Eschwege.

The members of the Order had to take part in a supper on Saturday evening at Jacobsdal, called the "Feast of the Gods" in the happy Arcadia. Ulfeldt was god Jupiter, Pimentel was dressed as a war god Mars and Radziejowski as Bacchus into the hall on a barrel with a large vinstop in hand. There were fourteen dancing couples on the first evening.

In 1656, the Order was dissolved. In July 1760, the Order of the Amarant was revived again as the Grand Order of the Amaranth in Stockholm, Sweden by Claes Qvist. The Order holds its ceremony and ball in Stockholm at Grand Hotel every even year since mid of the 19th century.

"Amaranth" derives from Greek ἀμάραντος (amarantos), "unfading," with the Greek word for "flower," ἄνθος (anthos), factoring into the word's development as "amaranth." The more accurate "amarant" is an archaic variant.

== Amaranther Order ==
Grand Amaranther Order Stora Amaranterorden
- Formation: 24 July 1760
- Legal status: Nonprofit organization
- Headquarters: Stockholm, Sweden
- Region served: Sweden; Finland
- General Grand Master: Count Fredrik Taube
- Grand Patron: King Carl XVI Gustaf
- Website: amaranterorden.se

The Grand Amaranther Order (Swedish: sv:Stora Amaranterorden) is the Swedish Fraternal Society which heads the chivalric Order of Amaranth under the patronage of the Monarch of Sweden.

=== Order of Amaranth ===
Order of Amaranth
- Status: Currently constituted
- Grand Master: Count Fredrik Taube
- Honorary Grand Master: Princess Sophie, Princess of Prussia
- Ranks: Knight/Dame
- Grades: Grand Cross, Special Class; Grand Cross, 1st Class; Grand Cross, 2nd Class; Grand Cross; Officer; Knight/Dame

==== Grades ====
- Grand Cross
  - - Special Class
  - - 1st Class
  - - 2nd Class
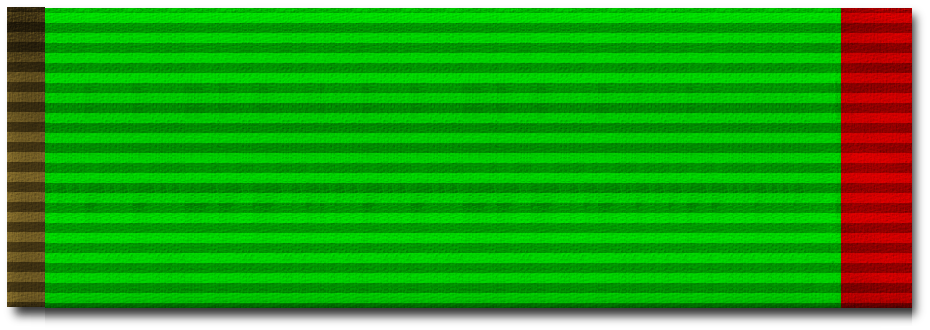
- - Officer
- - Knight

==== Grand Masters ====
- 2007 - 2017 - Baron Per Taube af Odenkat
- 2017 - Present - Count Fredrik Taube

===== Honorary Grand Masters =====
- 1952 - 1956 - Princess Estelle Bernadotte
- 1956 - 1962 - Vacant
- 1962 - 1964 - Countess Margareta Essen
- 1964 - 1966 - Baroness Gunhild Platen
- 1966 - 1968 - Baroness Susan af Ugglas
- 1968 - 2002 - Position Dormant
- 2002 - 2004 - Princess Christina of Sweden
- 2004 - 2006 - Catherine von Heidenstam
- 2006 - 2008 - Princess Anni-Frid, Countess of Plauen
- 2008 - 2010 - Princess Marie, Princess of Solms-Hohensolms-Lich
- 2010 - 2012 - Christina d'Otrante, Duchess of Otrante
- 2012 - 2014 - Countess Catharina Schinkel
- 2014 - 2016 - Countess Else Essen
- 2016 - 2018 - Princess Silvia d'Arenberg, Duchess of Arenberg
- 2018 - 2020 - Countess Caroline Hamilton
- 2020 - 2022 - Vacant
- 2022 - 2024 - Princess Marie Luise of Sayn-Wittgenstein-Berleburg
- 2024 - 2026 - Baroness Anna Bonde
- 2026 - present - Princess Sophie, Princess of Prussia

==== Recipients ====
===== Sweden =====
- King Gustaf VI Adolf - Special Class
- Queen Louise - Special Class (1924)
- Princess Estelle Bernadotte - Special Class
- Princess Margaretha
- Princess Désirée, Baroness Silfverschiöld - Special Class (1960)
- Princess Christina - Special Class (1966)
- King Carl XVI Gustaf - Special Class
- Queen Silvia - Special Class
- Tord Magnuson - Special Class

===== Foreign =====
Grand Cross

- Denmark
  - Princess Thyra
- Germany
  - Prince Ludwig, Hereditary Grand Duke of Hesse
  - Princess Marie Luise of Sayn-Wittgenstein-Berleburg - Special Class (2022)
  - Princess Natascha of Sayn-Wittgenstein-Berleburg - 2nd Class (2022)
  - Prince Georg Friedrich, Prince of Prussia - Special Class (2026)
  - Princess Sophie, Princess of Prussia - Special Class (2026)
- Luxembourg
  - Grand Duke Jean I - Special Class
  - Grand Duchess Joséphine-Charlotte - Special Class
- Norway
  - King Olav V - Special Class
  - Princess Astrid - Special Class
- United Kingdom
  - Queen Elizabeth II - Special Class (1956)
  - Prince Philip, Duke of Edinburgh - Special Class (1956)
  - Princess Margaret, Countess of Snowdon - Special Class (1956)
  - Prince Henry, Duke of Gloucester - Special Class (1956)
  - Princess Alice, Duchess of Gloucester - Special Class (1956)

== Sources ==
- C. G. U. Scheffer, Stora amaranterordens historia (1942).
