= Jonathan Ashe =

Jonathan Ashe (fl. 1813), was an Irish masonic writer.

Ashe was born in Limerick in 1766, entered Trinity College Dublin, 26 March 1783, took B.A. degree in ordinary course, and became D.D. in 1808. Very little is known of him except that he commenced and perfected his masonic studies in Dublin.

While in Bristol in 1813 he published a work entitled 'The Masonic Manual, or Lectures on Freemasonry, containing the Instructions, Documents, and Discipline of the Masonic Economy,' and asserts in the introduction that he 'plainly and completely tells the craft its eternal and temporal obligations, and affords the uninitiated a fair review and estimate of masonry.' This work was dedicated to the Duke of Sussex, then grand master of the order. In many portions it is a mere copy of William Hutchinson's 'Spirit of Masonry,' published in 1775.

Ashe's work was edited, with annotations and remarks by the Rev. George Oliver, D.D., in 1843, and again in 1870 by the Rev. John Edward Cox, D.D.
