= Robert Macoy =

American businessman and Freemason

Robert Macoy (October 4, 1815 – January 9, 1895) was born in Armagh, Ulster County, Ireland. He moved to the United States at the age of 4 months. He was a prominent Freemason, and was instrumental in the founding of the Order of the Eastern Star and the Order of the Amaranth. He also founded what may be the largest Masonic publishing, regalia, and supply house currently active, Macoy Publishing & Masonic Supply Company.

== Life ==
Growing up in America and having attained a considerable degree of education, Macoy entered the printing craft as soon as he was old enough to work. He spent most of his life in that business and in Masonic activities in New York City. In 1849, he started a Masonic supply and publishing business, which, under the name, Macoy Publishing & Masonic Supply Company, is still in active operation.

== Masonic activities ==
Macoy was initiated in Lebanon Lodge No. 191 in New York City, January 20, 1848, passed, January 27, and Raised February 3 of that year. On August 15, 1855, he withdrew to affiliate with Adelphic Lodge No. 348. He was elected Deputy Grand Master of New York in June, 1856 and reelected in 1857.

He was exalted in Orient Chapter No. 138, Royal Arch Masons, September 5, 1849 and became a member of Adelphic Chapter No. 150 on December 24, 1855. He was also affiliated with Union Chapter No. 180, Americas Chapter No. 215, and De Witt Clinton Chapter No. 142.

He also received the Cryptic degrees and was a charter member of Adelphic Council No. 7, Royal and Select Masters. He was elected Grand Recorder of the Grand Council on June 4, 1855. He was also knighted in Palestine Encampment No. 18 of New York City, in February, 1851, and in March withdrew to join Morton Encampment No. 4. On April 28, 1874, he affiliated with DeWitt Clinton Commandery No. 27 Knights Templar, where his membership continued for 20 years.

He received the Scottish Rite degrees sometime prior to December 9, 1850, for on that date he received the 33rd Degree, Sovereign Grand Inspector General.

In 1869 Macoy published A Dictionary of Freemasonry, which comprised his own work ("General History of Freemasonry" and "Cyclopaedia of Freemasonry") as well as George Oliver's Dictionary of Symbolical Masonry of 1853. It has been reprinted.

== Order of the Eastern Star ==
Robert Macoy and Rob Morris were close friends and their families often visited each other in Kentucky and New York. Before 1860 Macoy became interested in Morris' efforts to promote an organization for female relatives of Masons. Morris had formed "Constellations" - also the "Family System" in conferring degrees, but these proved too elaborate and cumbersome. Morris turned over his books on "Adoptive" Masonry to Macoy in 1868.

Macoy published his first Adoptive Rite for the Eastern Star in 1869 having organized the work into the Chapter system and it is from Macoy's rite that all Eastern Star rituals used today have been taken.

In 1883 Macoy founded at New York the Order of the Amaranth in connection with the Eastern Star.

The First Order of Eastern Star was Alpha Chapter no. 1 which is located in New York City, which meets at the Grand Lodge of State of New York, Free and accepted Masons. Alpha is the oldest chapter of The Order of Eastern Star.

== See also ==
- List of Freemasons
