= Désirée of Sweden =

Désirée of Sweden may refer to:

- Désirée Clary or Desideria (1777–1860), Queen consort of Sweden and Norway 1818
- Princess Désirée, Baroness Silfverschiöld (1938−2026), Princess of Sweden
