= Wellins =

Wellins may refer to:

- Dean Wellins (born 1971), American film director, storyboard artist, screenwriter, and animator
- Bobby Wellins (1936–2016), Scottish jazz saxophonist
- Wellins Calcott (fl. 1756–1769), British Christian author and Freemason

== See also ==
- Wellin (disambiguation)
