= Prince Gustaf Adolf, Duke of Västerbotten =

Swedish prince (1906–1947)

Prince Gustaf Adolf
- Duke of Västerbotten
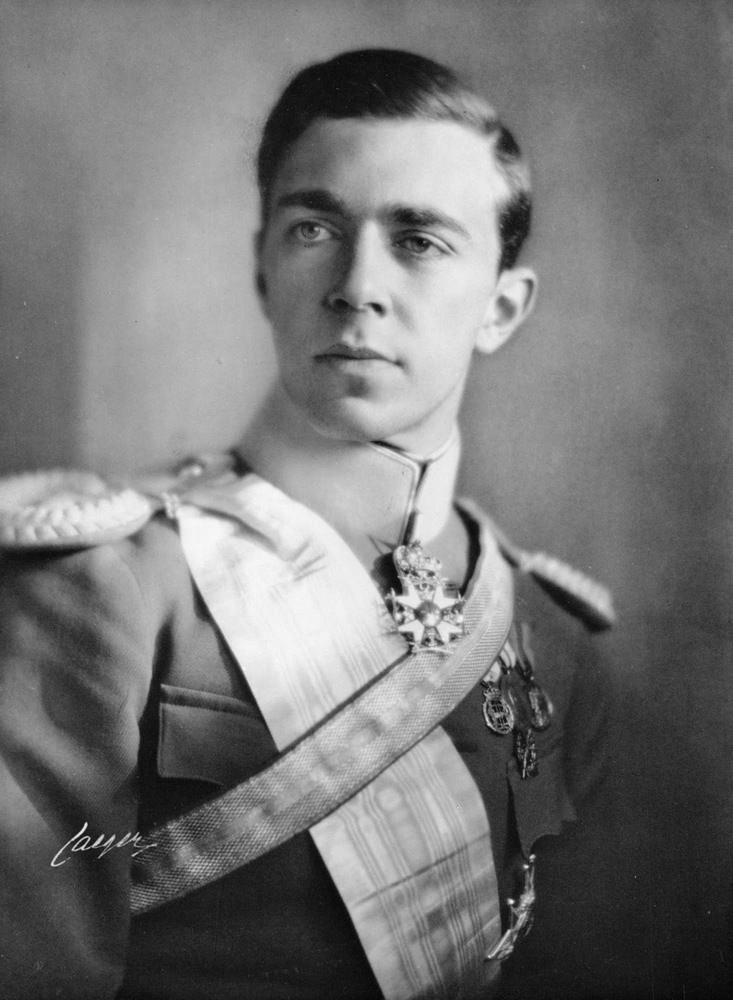
- Gustaf Adolf in 1932
- Born: Prince Gustaf Adolf of Sweden; 22 April 1906; Stockholm Palace, Stockholm, Sweden
- Died: 26 January 1947 (aged 40); Kastrup Airfield, Copenhagen, Denmark
- Cause of death: Air crash
- Burial: 4 February 1947; Royal Cemetery, Solna, Sweden
- Spouse: Princess Sibylla of Saxe-Coburg and Gotha (m. 1932)
- Issue: Princess Margaretha, Mrs. Ambler; Princess Birgitta of Sweden; Princess Désirée, Baroness Silfverschiöld; Princess Christina, Mrs. Magnuson; Carl XVI Gustaf
Names
- Gustaf Adolf Oscar Fredrik Arthur Edmund
- House: Bernadotte
- Father: Gustaf Adolf, Crown Prince of Sweden (later Gustaf VI Adolf)
- Mother: Margaret of Connaught

Prince Gustaf Adolf of Sweden, Duke of Västerbotten (Gustaf Adolf Oscar Fredrik Arthur Edmund; 22 April 1906 – 26 January 1947) was a Swedish prince who for most of his life was second in the line of succession to the Swedish throne with the title of Hereditary Prince.

He was the eldest son of the future King Gustaf VI Adolf, who was crown prince for most of his son's life, and his first wife, Princess Margaret of Connaught. Hereditary Prince Gustaf Adolf thus had the prospect of succeeding his father as King of Sweden but never became king as he was killed on 26 January 1947 in an airplane crash at Kastrup Airport, Copenhagen, Denmark. He thus predeceased both his grandfather and his father who ascended the Swedish throne three years after his son's death.

The current king, Carl XVI Gustaf, is Prince Gustaf Adolf's son.

== Early life ==
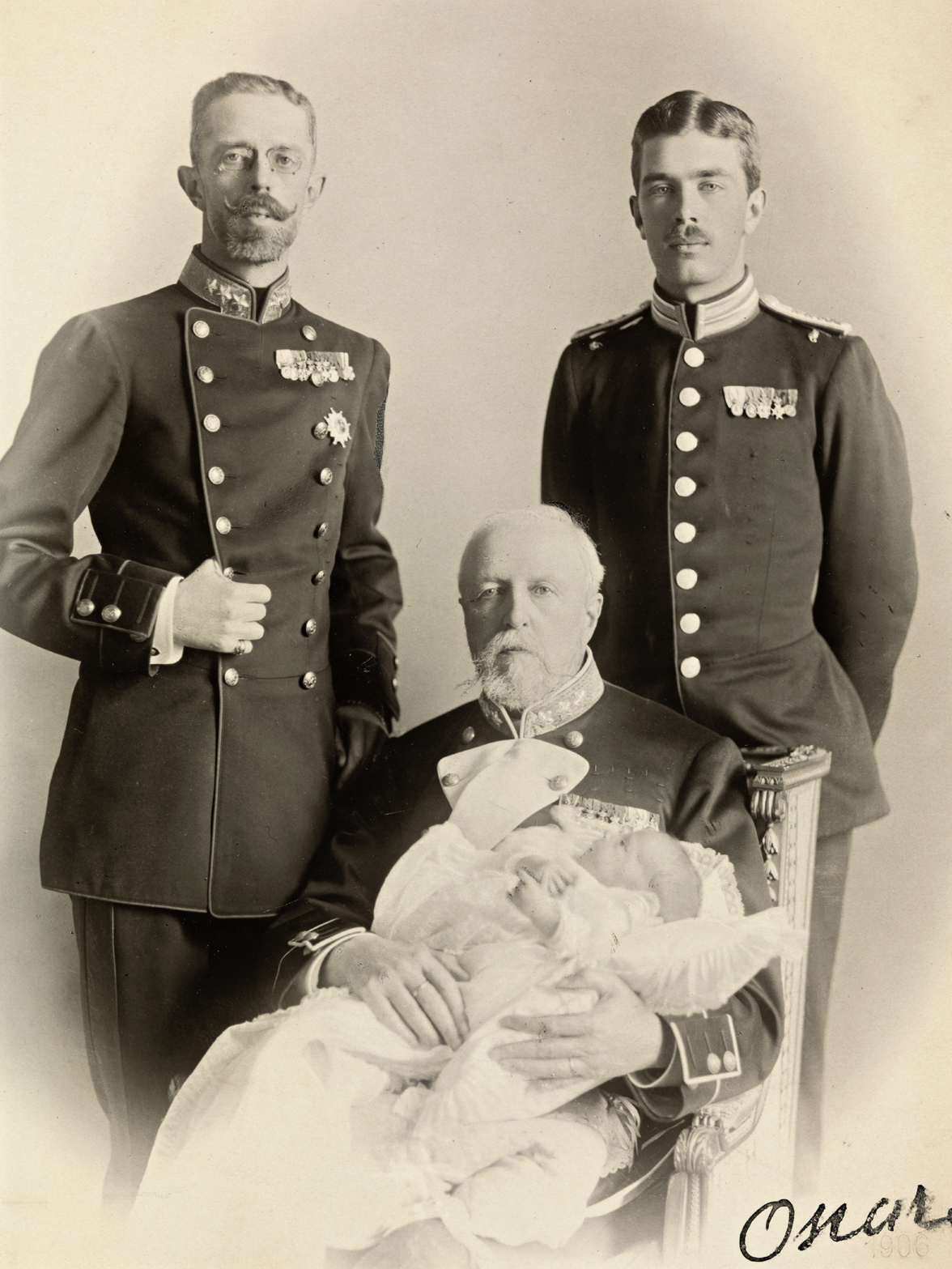
Gustaf Adolf wears the Swedish royal christening gown at his christening in 1906. He is held by his great-grandfather with his grandfather and father standing behind.

Gustaf Adolf was born at 11:10 pm on 22 April 1906 at the Royal Palace in Stockholm, during the reign of his great-grandfather King Oscar II. He was the eldest son of the Duke and Duchess of Scania, the then Hereditary Prince Gustaf Adolf and his first wife Princess Margaret of Connaught. His father was the eldest son of the then Crown Prince Gustav of Sweden by his marriage to Princess Victoria of Baden, while his mother was the eldest daughter of Queen Victoria's third son Prince Arthur, Duke of Connaught by his marriage to Princess Louise Margaret of Prussia.

The young prince was baptised on 15 June 1906, his parents' one-year wedding anniversary, by the Archbishop of Uppsala, Johan August Ekman, in the ball room Vita havet (English: The White Sea) in the State Apartments at the Royal Palace in Stockholm. The royal christening gown, which has been used for the baptism of almost all royal children in Sweden ever since, was used for the first time at his christening. He was baptised with the names Gustaf Adolf Oscar Fredrik Arthur Edmund. In public he was known by the names Gustaf Adolf, and in the family he was known by his last given name, Edmund.

Gustaf Adolf passed studentexamen at Stockholm Palace in 1925 and attended the Cavalry Officer Candidate School (Kavalleriets officersaspirantskola, KavOAS) in Eksjö the following year and in 1926–1927 the Royal Military Academy. He was then commissioned as fänrik in the Svea Life Guards (I 1) and the Life Regiment Dragoons (K 2) and in 1928 in the Life Regiment of Horse (K 1). Gustaf Adolf continued his military training and became major in the General Staff Corps, Svea Life Guards, and the Life Regiment of Horse in 1941 In 1943, he became lieutenant colonel in the General Staff Corps, in Svea Life Guards, in Västerbotten Regiment and in the Swedish Cavalry. He was lieutenant colonel at his death.

== Interests and royal duties ==
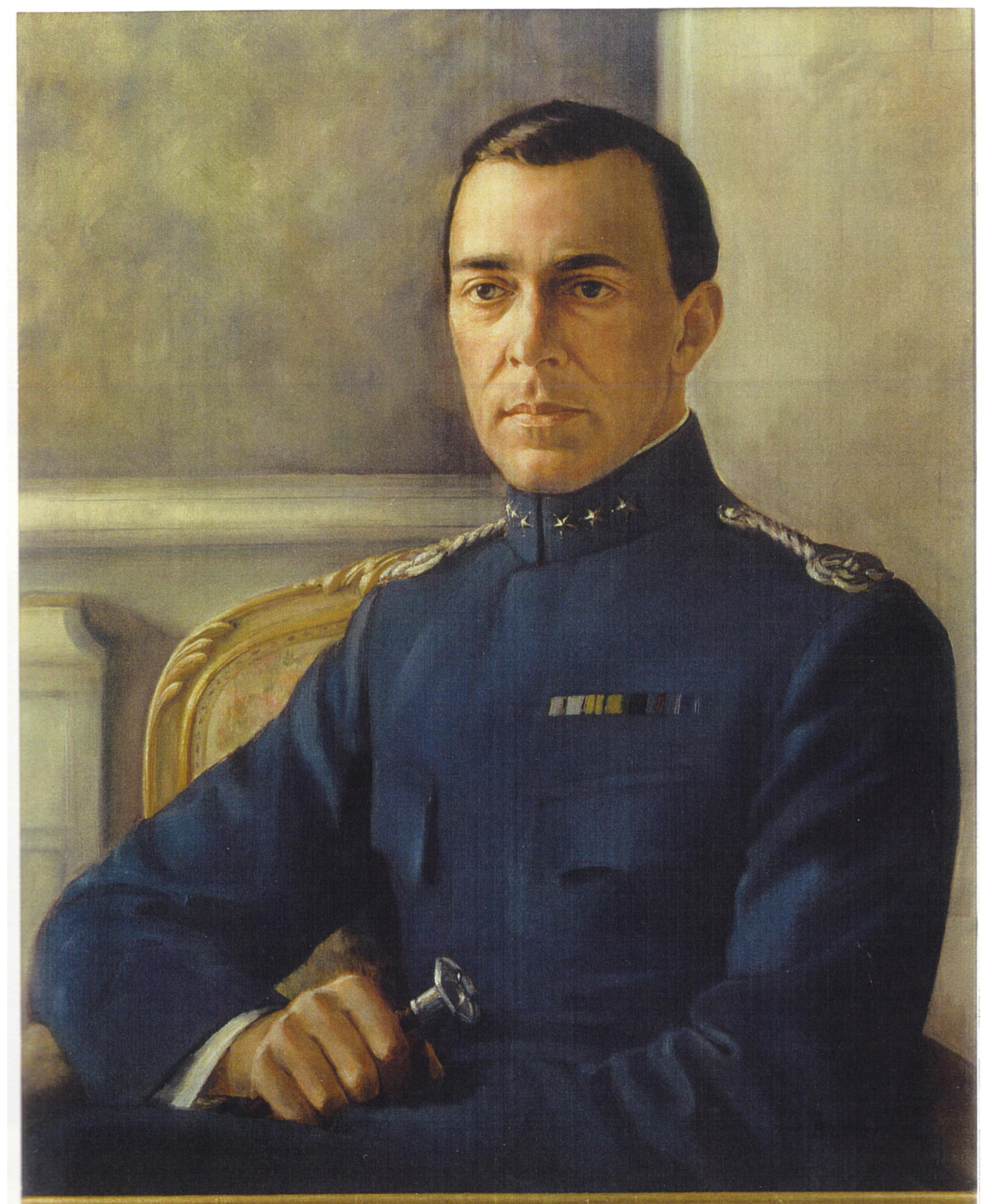
Gustaf Adolf as painted by Bianca Wallin in 1939

Gustaf Adolf, who served as president of the Swedish Olympic Committee from 1933 until his death in 1947, had competed in show jumping at the 1936 Summer Olympics.

Gustaf Adolf joined the Boy Scouts, and as an adult became a Scoutmaster. He earned his Wood Badge beads at Gilwell Park in England. When the Svenska Scoutrådet formed he served as its first president or Chief Scout. He led the Swedish contingents at the 5th World Scout Jamboree in 1937 and at the World Scout Moot in 1939. He served on the World Scout Committee from May 1937 until his death.

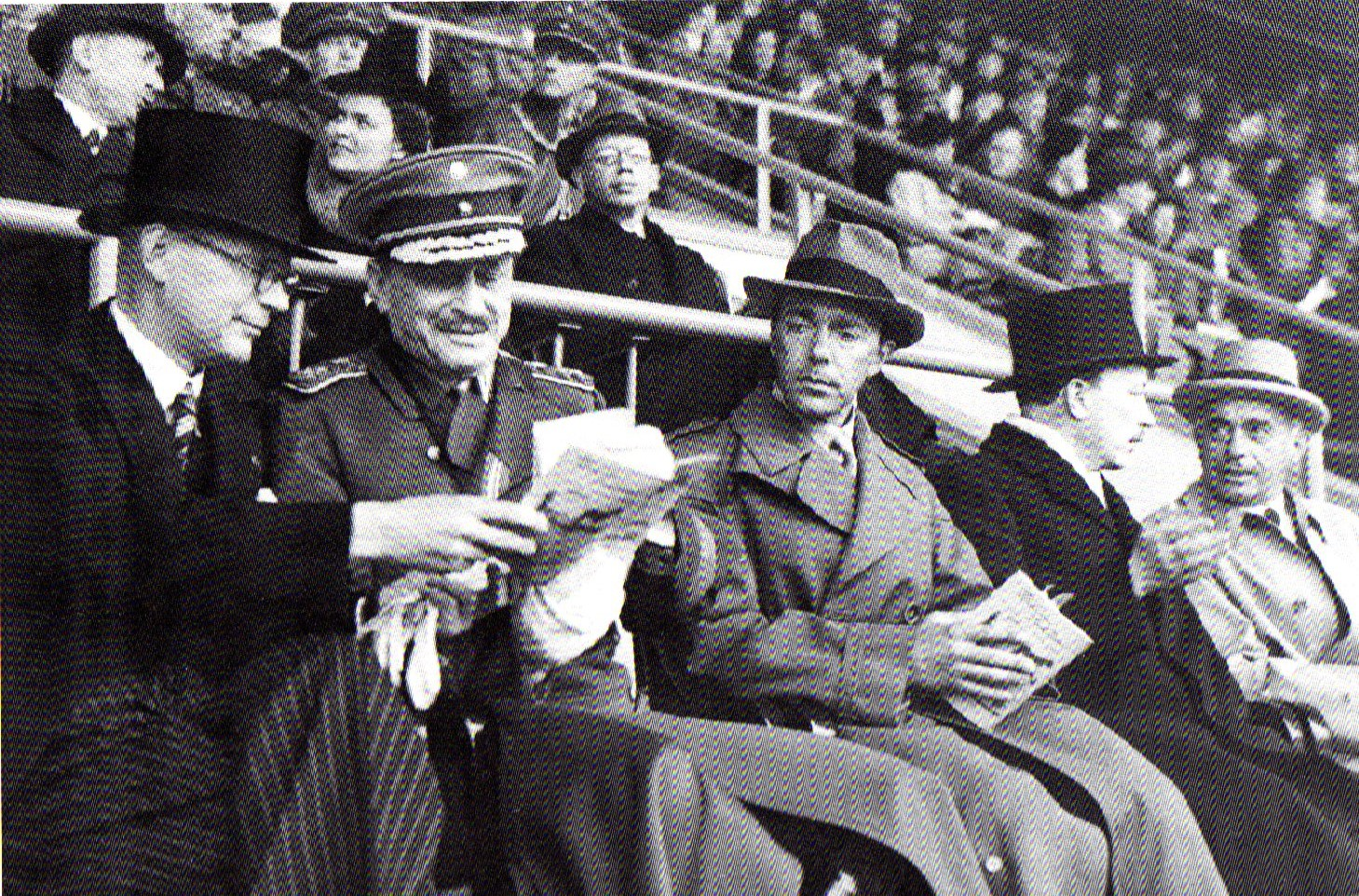
7–8 September 1940, Finland, Sweden and Germany played a triathlon match at the Helsinki Olympic Stadium, built for the 1940 Summer Olympics that were cancelled due to World War II. From the left, the chairman of the Finnish Athletics Federation Urho Kekkonen, Marshal Gustav Mannerheim, president of the Swedish Olympic Committee Prince Gustaf Adolf, Prime Minister Risto Ryti and Reich Sports Leader Hans von Tschammer und Osten.

From 1932, Prince Gustaf Adolf was chairman of the Swedish Scout Council and from 1937 honorary chairman of the International Scout Committee. Since 1933, the prince was also chairman of the Central Board of the Swedish Sports Confederation, the Swedish Central Association for Sports Promotion (Centralföreningen för idrottens främjande) and the Swedish Olympic Committee. Prince Gustaf Adolf was chairman of the Royal Swedish Aero Club from 1937 and the Royal Automobile Club from 1939. He was first honorary member of the Swedish Central Federation for Voluntary Military Training (Centralförbundet för Befälsutbildning), of the Royal Society of Sciences in Uppsala, of the Royal Swedish Academy of War Sciences, of the Royal Swedish Academy of Music, of the Royal Swedish Society of Naval Sciences and honorary member of the Royal Swedish Academy of Sciences. He was also honorary chairman of the Central Organization of the Swedish Women’s Auxiliary Veterinary Corps (Centralstyrelsen för Svenska blå stjärnan).

== Marriage and family ==
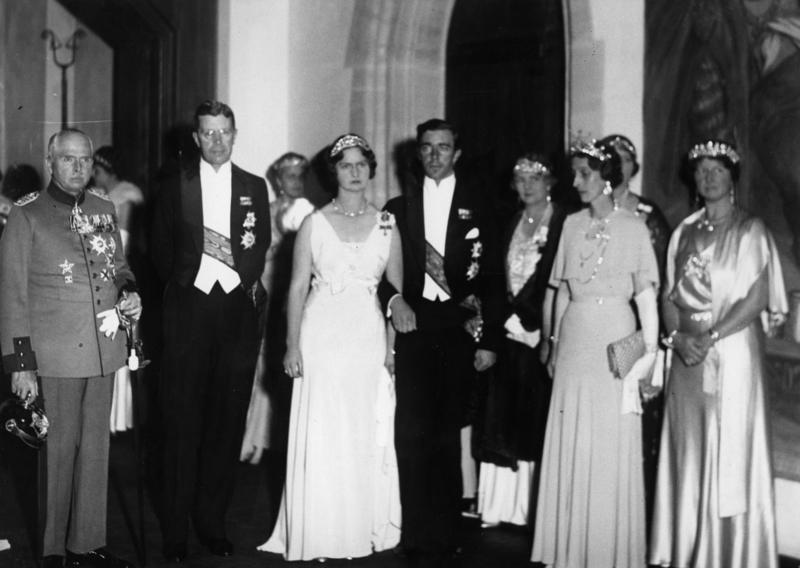
Wedding of Hereditary Prince Gustaf Adolf and Princess Sibylla of Saxe-Coburg and Gotha in 1932.

On 20 October 1932 at St. Moritz Church in Coburg, Gustaf Adolf married his second cousin, Princess Sibylla of Saxe-Coburg and Gotha, daughter of Charles Edward, former Duke of Saxe-Coburg and Gotha.

The couple had five children:

- Princess Margaretha, Mrs. Ambler (born 31 October 1934) married John Ambler on 30 June 1964. They had three children.
- Princess Birgitta of Sweden and Hohenzollern (19 January 1937 – 4 December 2024) married Prince Johann Georg of Hohenzollern on 25 May 1961. They had three children.
- Princess Désirée, Baroness Silfverschiöld (2 June 1938 – 21 January 2026) married Baron Niclas Silfverschiöld on 5 June 1964. They had three children.
- Princess Christina, Mrs. Magnuson (born 3 August 1943) married Tord Magnuson on 15 June 1974. They had three sons.
- King Carl XVI Gustaf of Sweden (born 30 April 1946) married Silvia Sommerlath on 19 June 1976. They have three children.

== World War II ==
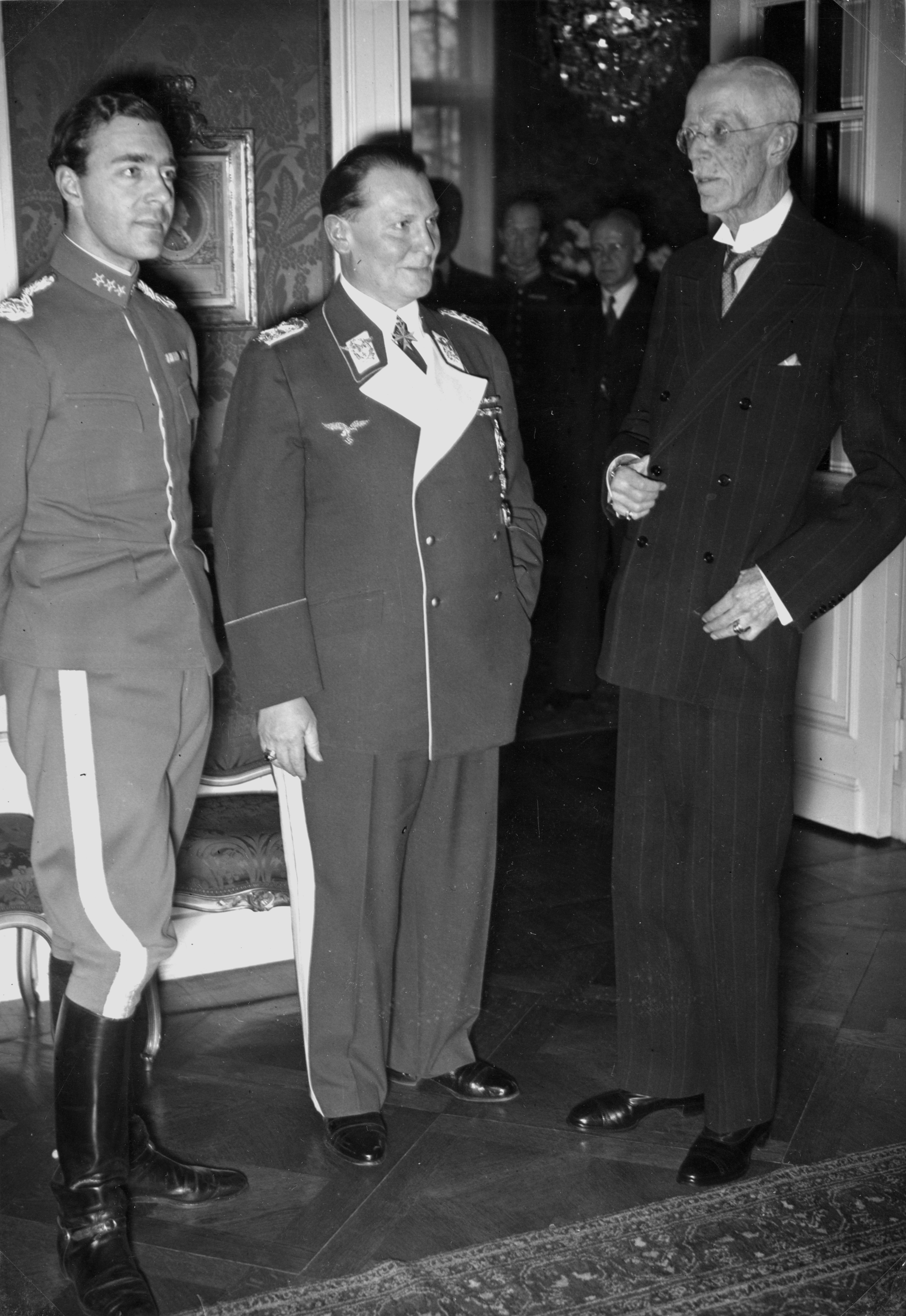
Prince Gustaf Adolf, Hermann Göring and the prince's grandfather King Gustaf V of Sweden in Berlin, February 1939

As an official representative of Sweden, Gustaf Adolf met with many Nazi leaders, including Adolf Hitler and Hermann Göring, which has led to speculations about possible Nazi sympathies. In his book Alla dessa Bernadottar (All these Bernadottes), Staffan Skott asserts that letters and diary entries by influential anti-Nazi Swedes disprove the rumors. The Swedish Royal Court made a statement denying any knowledge of Nazi sympathies.

Gustaf Adolf expressed his support for Finland during the Continuation War of 1941–1944, and would even have liked to participate as a voluntary soldier in the Winter War of 1939–1940, but the King's disapproval prevented this from happening.

Some leading Swedish politicians were averse to the possibility of seeing Gustaf Adolf inherit the throne, and one prominent Social Democrat publicly uttered that the prince was "a person who must never be king".

== Death ==
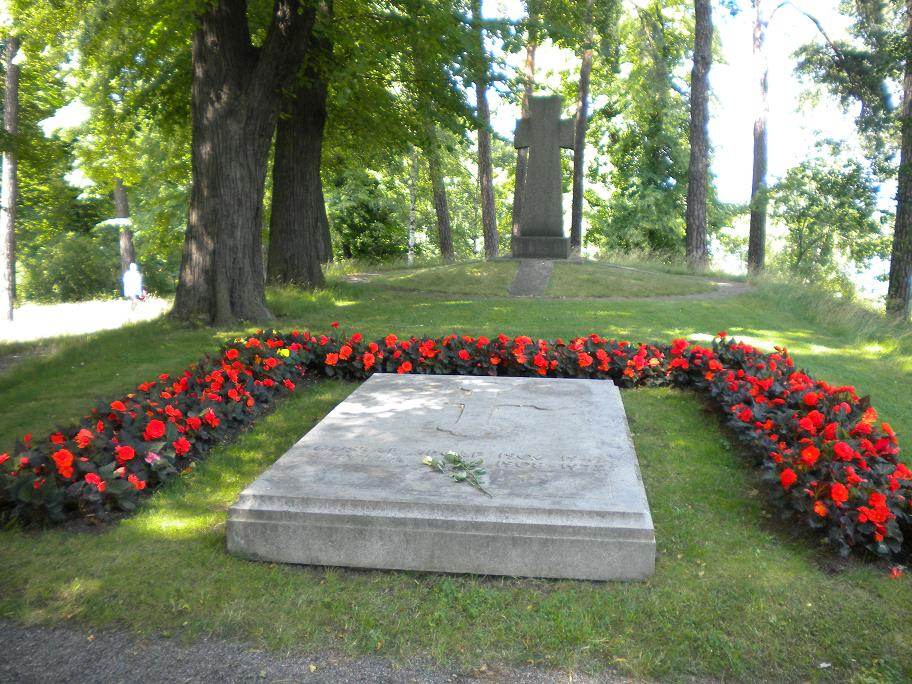
Gustaf Adolf's and Sibylla's grave on Karlsborg Island in Solna, Sweden.

Gustaf Adolf was killed in an airplane crash in the afternoon of 26 January 1947 at Kastrup Airport, Copenhagen, Denmark. The prince, along with two companions, was returning to Stockholm from a hunting trip and visit to Princess Juliana and Prince Bernhard of the Netherlands. The delayed KLM flight from Amsterdam had landed at Copenhagen for a routine stop before continuing to Stockholm. Soon after the Douglas DC-3 aircraft took off, it climbed to an altitude of about 50 meters (150 ft), stalled, and plummeted nose-first to the ground, where it exploded on impact. All 22 people aboard the plane (16 passengers and six crew members) were killed. Also aboard the ill-fated flight was American singer and actress Grace Moore and Danish actress Gerda Neumann. An investigation found that an inexperienced young employee had serviced the aircraft and, short of time, the plane's captain had failed to perform the final pre-flight check list properly. He took off not realizing that elevator locking pins were still in place.

At the time of his death, Gustaf Adolf had been second in line to the Swedish throne behind his father, the crown prince, who in 1950 became King Gustaf VI Adolf. The younger Gustaf Adolf was succeeded as second in line by his only son, Carl Gustaf (at the time only 9 months old), who would later succeed his grandfather in 1973 as King Carl XVI Gustaf.

== Honours and arms ==
Styles of Prince Gustaf Adolf, Duke of Västerbotten
- Reference style: His Royal Highness
- Spoken style: Your Royal Highness

=== Military ranks ===
Sweden

- (Sweden) 1927: Fänrik in the Svea Life Guards and the Life Regiment Dragoons
- (Sweden) 1928: Fänrik in the Life Regiment of Horse
- (Sweden) 1941: Major in the General Staff Corps, Svea Life Guards, and the Life Regiment of Horse
- (Sweden) 1943: Lieutenant Colonel in the General Staff Corps, Svea Life Guards, Västerbotten Regiment, and in the Swedish Cavalry

=== Honours ===
Orders

- (Sweden) 1906: Knight and Commander of the Orders of His Majesty the King (Knight of the Royal Order of the Seraphim)
- (Sweden) 1906: Commander Grand Cross of the Order of the Sword
- (Sweden) 1906: Commander Grand Cross of the Order of the Polar Star
- (Sweden) 1906: Crown Prince Gustaf V and Crown Princess Silver Wedding Medal
- (Sweden) 1907: King Oscar II and Queen Sofia's Golden Wedding Medal
- (Sweden) 25 May 1928: King Gustaf V's Jubilee Commemorative Medal
- (Sweden) 1906: Knight of the Order of Charles XIII

Foreign honours

- (Belgium) Grand Cordon of the Order of Leopold
- (Denmark) Knight of the Order of the Elephant
- (Estonia) Order of the Cross of the Eagle, 1st class
- Grand Cross of the Order of the White Rose of Finland
- (Finland) First Class of the Order of the Cross of Liberty with swords, oak leaf and star
- Order of Merit of the Republic of Hungary
- Knight Grand Cross of the Order of the Netherlands Lion
- (Norway) Grand Cross of the Order of St. Olav with Collar
- (Saxe-Coburg and Gotha) Grand Cross of the Saxe-Ernestine House Order
- (United Kingdom) Honorary Knight Grand Cross of the Royal Victorian Order
- (United Kingdom) Recipient of the King George VI Coronation Medal

=== Arms ===
The arms of Prince Gustaf Adolf were those of the Kingdom of Sweden, with a quarter with the arms of Västerbotten in base.

== Ancestry ==
Ancestors of Prince Gustaf Adolf, Duke of Västerbotten

8. Oscar II of Sweden
4. Gustaf V of Sweden
9. Princess Sophia of Nassau
2. Gustaf VI Adolf of Sweden
10. Frederick I, Grand Duke of Baden
5. Princess Victoria of Baden
11. Princess Louise of Prussia
1. Prince Gustaf Adolf, Duke of Västerbotten
12. Prince Albert of Saxe-Coburg and Gotha
6. Prince Arthur, Duke of Connaught and Strathearn
13. Queen Victoria of the United Kingdom
3. Princess Margaret of Connaught
14. Prince Frederick Charles of Prussia
7. Princess Louise Margaret of Prussia
15. Princess Maria Anna of Anhalt-Dessau
