= Frederick IV of Germany =

Frederick IV of Germany may refer to:

- Frederick III, Holy Roman Emperor (1415–1493), Holy Roman Emperor from 1452 until his death
- Georg Friedrich, Prince of Prussia (born 1976), head of the Royal House of Hohenzollern, pretender to the German throne
