= Tord Magnuson =

Swedish businessman

Tord Magnuson KVO1kl
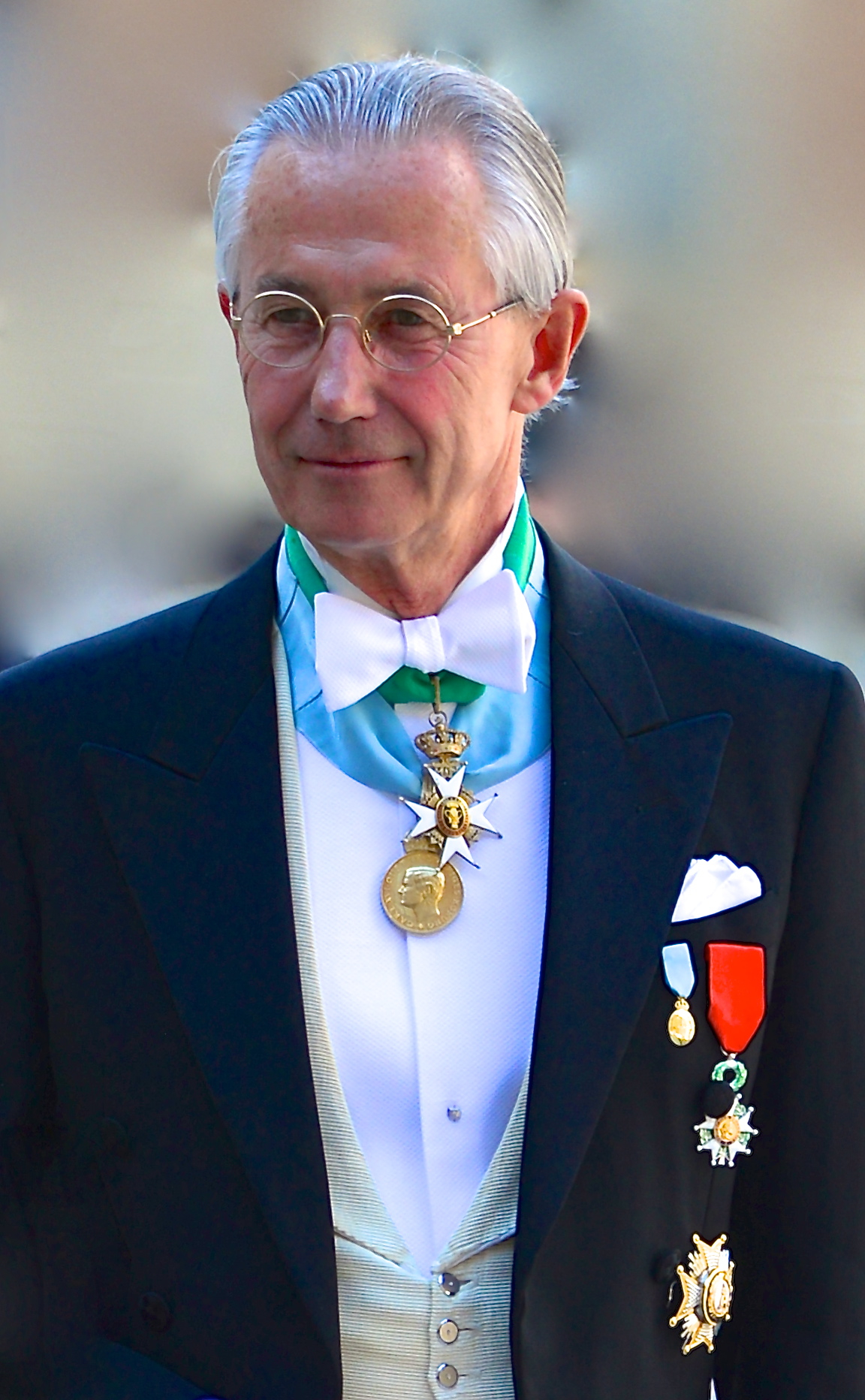
- Magnuson in 2013
- Born: Tord Gösta Magnuson; 7 April 1941 (age 85); Stockholm, Sweden
- Education: Stockholm University
- Spouse: Princess Christina of Sweden (m. 1974)
- Children: Gustaf Magnuson; Oscar Magnuson; Victor Magnuson

Tord Gösta Magnuson KVO1kl (born 7 April 1941) is a Swedish business executive and the consul general for Mauritius. He is married to Princess Christina of Sweden, the youngest of the older sisters of King Carl XVI Gustaf. With the deaths of John Ambler in 2008, Prince Johann Georg of Hohenzollern in 2016 and Baron Niclas Silfverschiöld in 2017, Magnuson is the only living brother-in-law of Carl XVI Gustaf.

== Early life ==
Magnuson was born on 7 April 1941, the son of civil engineer Lennart Magnuson and school principal Gerda (née Klemming). His paternal grandfather was the chemical engineer and businessman Gunnar Magnuson (1884–1951), while his great-grandfather was Tord Magnuson (1851–1929), a manager at Sandviken Ironworks and a politician.

He graduated as a reserve officer in 1963 and earned a Bachelor of Arts degree from Stockholm University in 1967.

== Career ==
Magnuson held positions at Stockholms Enskilda Bank, Sandvik Steel Inc. in New York, and Kayel AB. He subsequently served as CEO of Devisa AB, as a director of Air Mauritius in Sweden, and as Consul General of Mauritius. He also served on the boards of Enskilda Gymnasiet and Den gyldene freden.

== Marriage and family ==
Magnuson and his wife first met in 1961. They married on 15 June 1974 in the Royal Chapel of the Stockholm Palace. As a result of her constitutionally unapproved marriage to Magnuson, she lost her style of Royal Highness and received the courtesy title of Princess Christina, Mrs. Magnuson. They have three sons: Carl Gustaf Victor (b. 1975), an economist; Tord Oscar Frederik (born 1977), an eyewear designer; and Victor Edmund Lennart (born 1980), a game designer.

== Honours and awards ==
=== National honours ===
- Sweden: Commander 1st Class of the Royal Order of Vasa
- Sweden: Recipient of H.M The King's Medal, Gold 12th in Size
- Sweden: Recipient of the 50th Birthday Medal of King Carl XVI Gustaf
- Sweden: Recipient of the Wedding Medal of Crown Princess Victoria to Daniel Westling
- Sweden: Recipient of the King Carl XVI Gustaf Ruby Jubilee Medal
- Sweden: Recipient of the 70th Birthday Medal of King Carl XVI Gustaf
- Sweden: Recipient of the Golden Jubilee Badge Medal of King Carl XVI Gustaf

=== Foreign honours ===
- France: Officer of the Order of the Legion of Honour
- Luxembourg: Grand Officer of the Order of Adolphe of Nassau
- Netherlands: Knight Grand Officer of the Order of the Crown (11 October 2022)

=== Award ===
- Sweden: Knight Grand Cross of the Order of the Amaranth
