= Wellin (disambiguation) =

Wellin is a municipality in the province of Luxembourg, Belgium.

Wellin may also refer to:

- Arthur Wellin (1880–?), German film director, actor, screenwriter and producer
- Bertha Wellin (1870–1951), Swedish politician

== See also ==
- Wellins (disambiguation)
