= Koberg Castle =

Castle in Västergötland, Sweden

- Kobergs slott
- Sweden
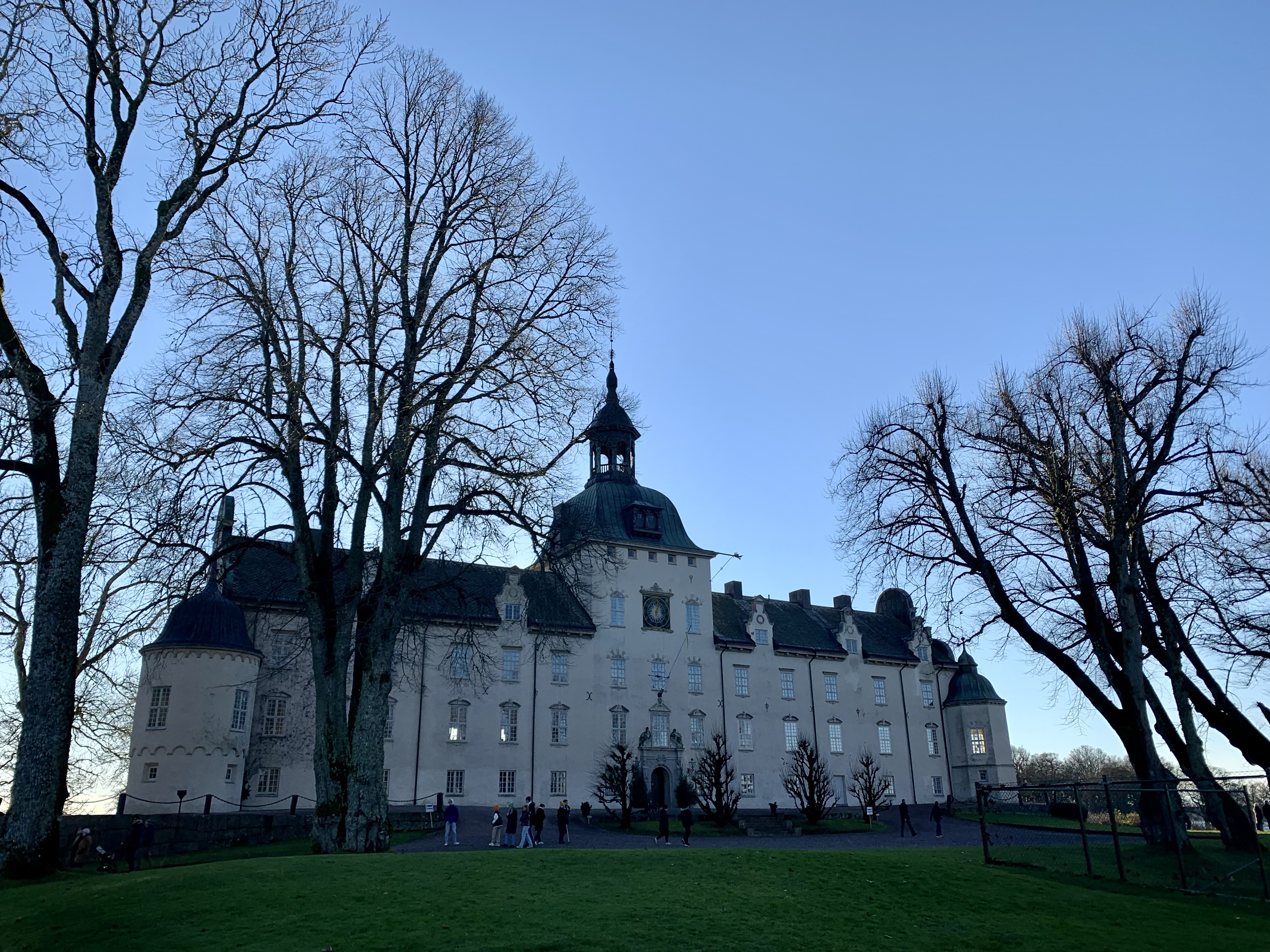
- Koberg Castle

Site information
- Type: Castle
- Open to the public: No

Location
- Coordinates: 58°09′50″N 12°24′40″E

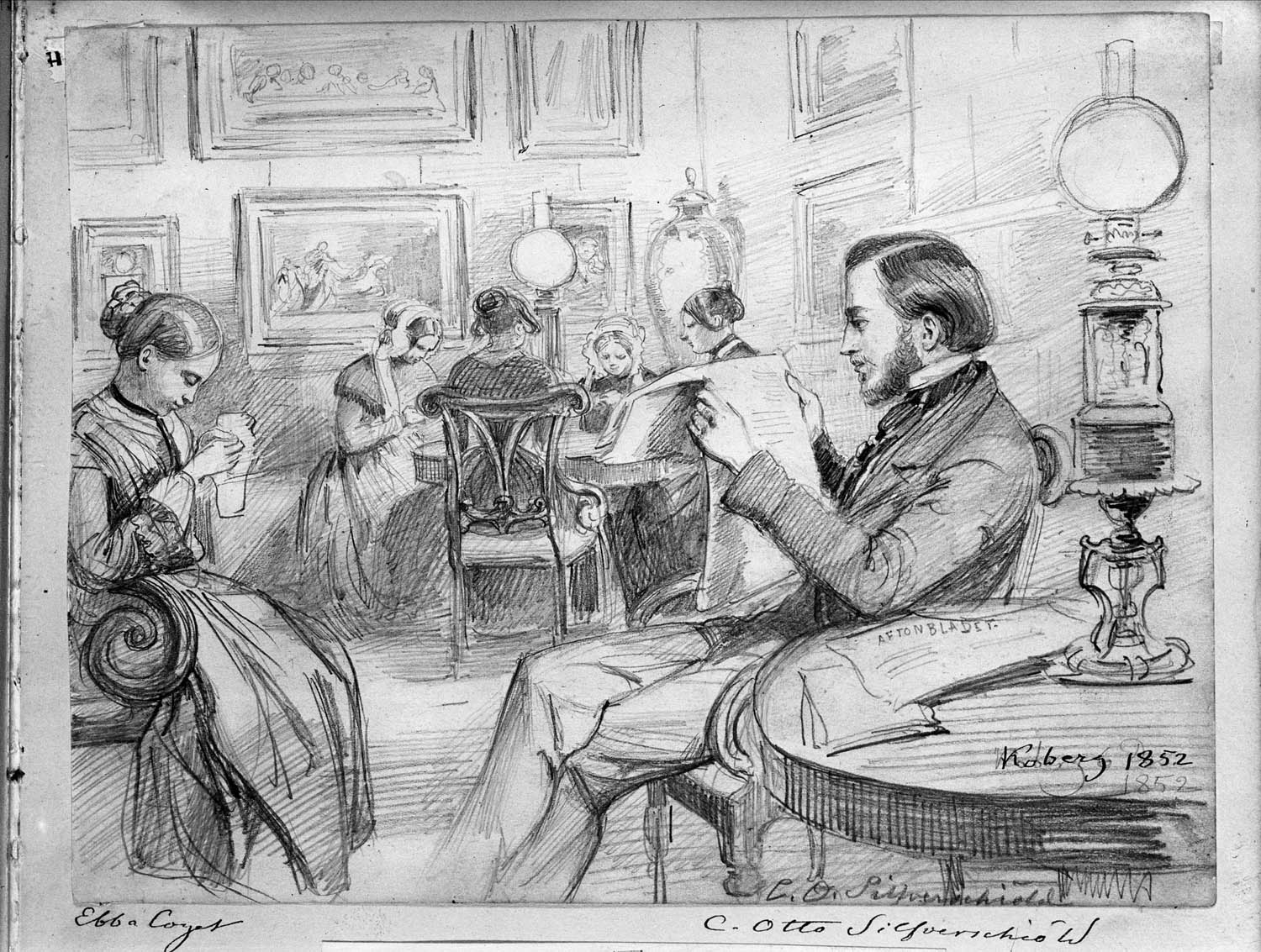
Interior of Koberg Castle, by Fritz von Dardel 1852.

Koberg Castle (Kobergs slott) is a castle in Västergötland, Sweden. It was the residence of Princess Désirée, Baroness Silfverschiöld and her husband Baron Niclas Silfverschiöld until their respective deaths in 2026 and 2017.

Koberg is located near the lake Vanderydsvattnet, about 10 km south of Trollhättan. The castle is a three-storey building of stone flanked by two solid domed round towers. The main building was restored in the style of Neo - Renaissance architecture during the 1890s under design by Swedish architect Fredrik Lilljekvist (1863–1932).

== See also ==
- List of castles in Sweden
