= Sophie Prinzessin von Preussen =

Princess of Prussia

Sophie
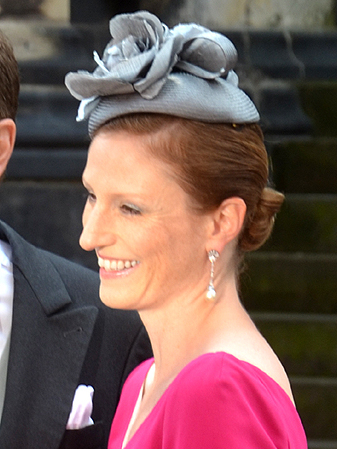
- Sophie in 2017

Consort of the Head of the House of Hohenzollern Princess of Prussia
- Tenure: 25 August 2011 – present
- Born: Sophie Johanna Maria Prinzessin von Isenburg; 7 March 1978 (age 48); Frankfurt, West Germany
- Spouse: Georg Friedrich Prinz von Preussen (m. 2011)
- Issue: 4
Names
- Sophie Johanna Maria
- House: Isenburg
- Father: Franz-Alexander, Prince of Isenburg
- Mother: Countess Christine von Saurma-Jeltsch

Sophie Prinzessin von Preussen (born Sophie Johanna Maria Prinzessin von Isenburg; 7 March 1978) is the wife to Georg Friedrich Prinz von Preussen, head of the Prussian branch of the House of Hohenzollern.

== Early life and education ==
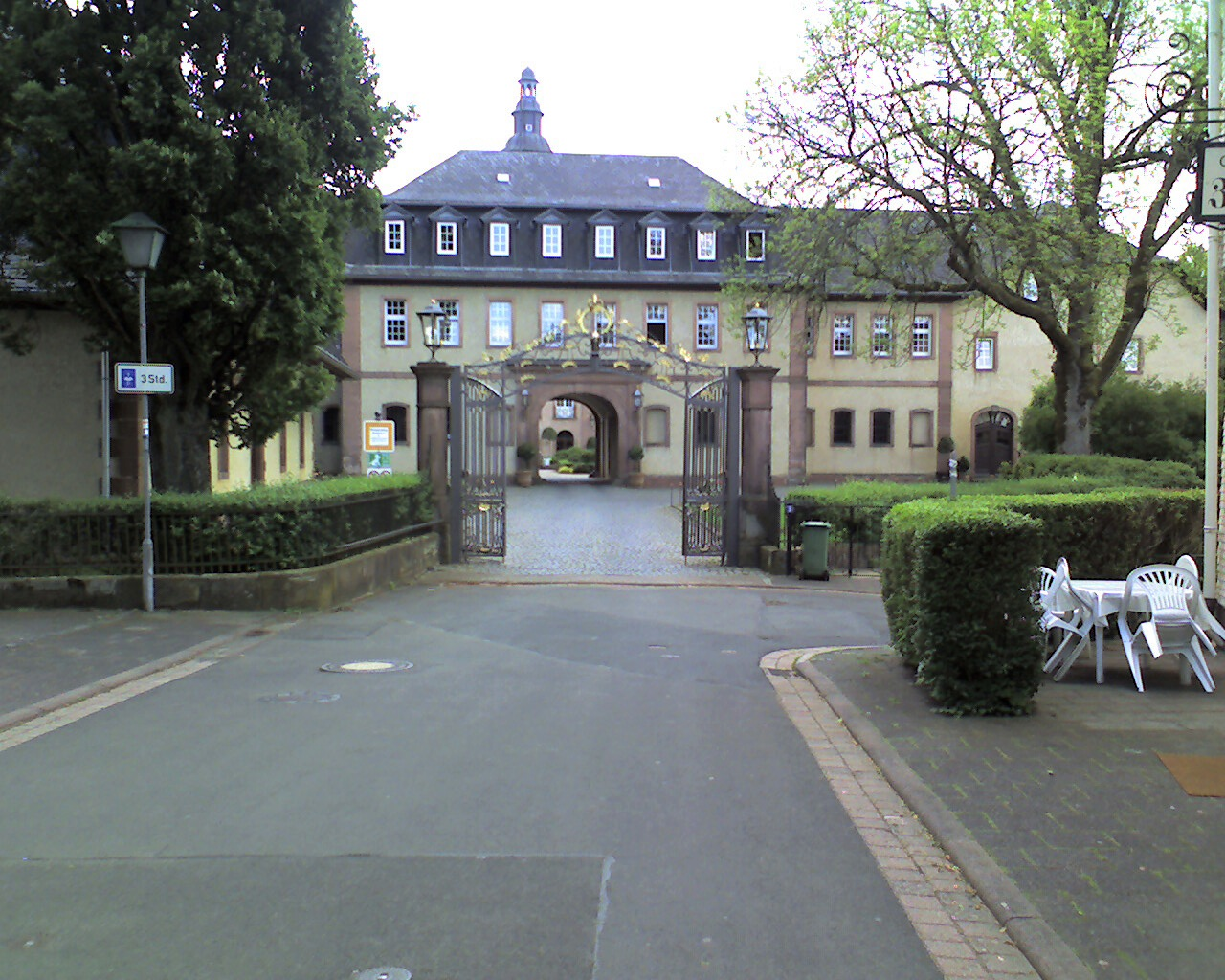
Birstein Castle

Sophie Johanna Maria of Isenburg was born on 7 March 1978 in Frankfurt, West Germany, to Franz-Alexander, Prince of Isenburg (1943–2018), and his wife, Countess Christine Saurma von und zu der Jeltsch (born 1941). Her father was the head of the Birstein branch of the House of Isenburg, a mediatized Catholic line of Princes of the Holy Roman Empire, who lost their independence in 1815. She has two sisters, Archduchess Katharina of Austria-Este and Isabelle, Dowager Princess of Wied, and two brothers, Alexander, 10th Prince of Isenburg, and Prince Viktor.

Growing up at Birstein Castle, the family seat in Hesse, Sophie studied at a primary school in Birstein and at Marienschule Fulda in Fulda. She then attended the boarding school Kloster Wald and passed her A-Levels as well as a trade test as a dressmaker. Sophie studied Business Administration at the University of Freiburg and Humboldt University of Berlin and worked at a firm that offers consulting services for nonprofit business.

== Marriage and issue ==
On 25 August 2011, Sophie civilly married Georg Friedrich Prinz von Preussen, at Potsdam's Stadthaus by Jann Jakobs, Mayor of Potsdam. The religious wedding took place at the Church of Peace on 27 August 2011, in commemoration of the 950th anniversary of the founding of the House of Hohenzollern. The wedding was covered live by German broadcaster RBB. The 700 guests included: Prince Hassan bin Talal and Princess Sarvath al-Hassan of Jordan; Prince Laurent of Belgium; Lord and Lady Nicholas Windsor; and then Crown Princess Margareta of Romania. Following the ceremony, a reception was held on the grounds of the Sanssouci palace.

Upon her marriage, she has been known by the courtesy title Her Imperial and Royal Highness The Princess of Prussia.

Sophie and Georg Friedrich have four children.

== Honours ==
- (German Empire) House of Hohenzollern: Knight of the Imperial and Royal Order of the Black Eagle
- (German Empire) House of Hohenzollern: Grand Mistress Dame Grand Cross of the Imperial and Royal Order of Louise

=== Foreign ===
- (Sweden) Amaranther Order Honorary Grand Master Knight Grand Cross, Special Class of the Order of Amaranth

Sophie Prinzessin von Preussen House of Isenburg Born: 7 March 1978
Titles in pretence
Vacant Title last held by Grand Duchess Kira Kirillovna of Russia	— TITULAR — German Empress; Queen of Prussia; 25 August 2011 – present Reason for succession failure: German monarchies abolished in 1918	Incumbent
