= Baron Niclas Silfverschiöld =

Swedish aristocrat and landowner

Högvälboren Baron Niclas Silfverschiöld KVO
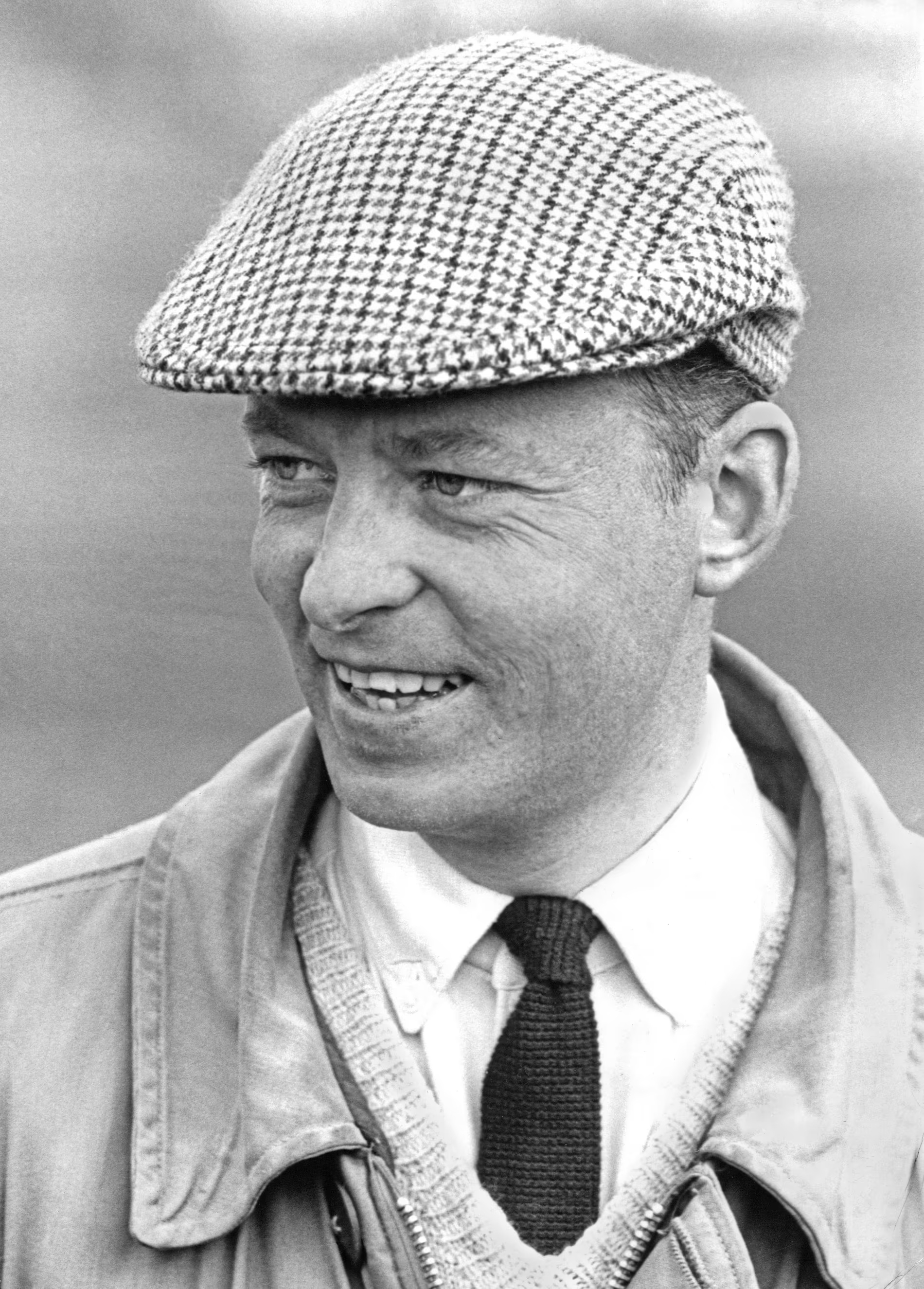
- Silfverschiöld in 1964
- Born: Niels-August Otto Carl Nicolas Silfverschiöld; 31 May 1934; Tölö, Sweden
- Died: 11 April 2017 (aged 82); Trollhättan, Sweden
- Burial place: Koberg Castle
- Spouse: Princess Désirée of Sweden (m. 1964)
- Children: 3

Baron Niels-August Otto Carl Nicolas Silfverschiöld KVO (31 May 1934 – 11 April 2017) was a Swedish aristocrat and landowner. From 1964, he was the husband of Princess Désirée of Sweden, third sister of King Carl XVI Gustaf of Sweden.

== Early life and family ==
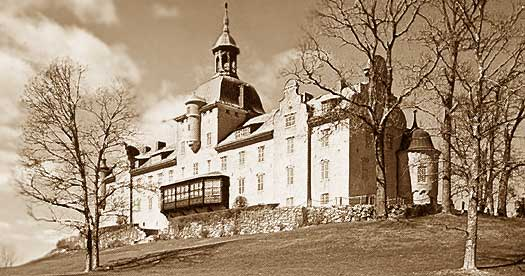
Koberg Castle, c. 1960

Silfverschiöld was born on 31 May 1934 in Halland to Baron Carl-Otto Silfverschiöld (1899–1955) and Elsa Madeleine Bennich (1906–1994). His paternal grandfather, Baron Otto Silfverschiöld (1871–1951), was a member of the Riksdag and his paternal grandmother, Ingeborg von Horn (1873–1953), was the sister of novelist Brita von Horn and aunt of Generalmajor Carl von Horn. Silfverschiöld was raised at the family seats, Koberg Castle in Västergötland and Gåsevadholm Castle in Halland.

Silfverschiöld graduated in 1954 and became a reserve officer in the Swedish Army in 1956, serving as a captain in the Life Guard Dragoons. After his father's death in 1955, he became responsible for the management of his family's estates. He attended agricultural college in Svalöv.

== Marriage and children ==
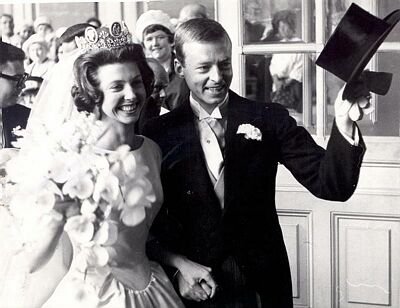
Silfverschiöld and Princess Désirée on their wedding day, 5 June 1964

On 19 December 1963, Silfverschiöld's engagement to Princess Désirée, third daughter of Prince Gustaf Adolf, Duke of Västerbotten, and Princess Sibylla of Saxe-Coburg and Gotha, was announced.

They married on 5 June 1964 at Storkyrkan. Though noble, Silfverschiöld was not of royal rank, and thus, according to policy then, Princess Désirée lost her style of Royal Highness and ceased to be a member of the royal house. She took the courtesy title Princess Désirée, Baroness Silfverschiöld. They had three children:

- Baron Carl Otto Edmund Silfverschiöld (born 22 March 1965)
- Baroness Christina-Louise Ewa Madelaine Silfverschiöld (born 29 September 1966)
- Baroness Hélène Ingeborg Sibylla Silfverschiöld (born 20 September 1968)

== Later life and death ==
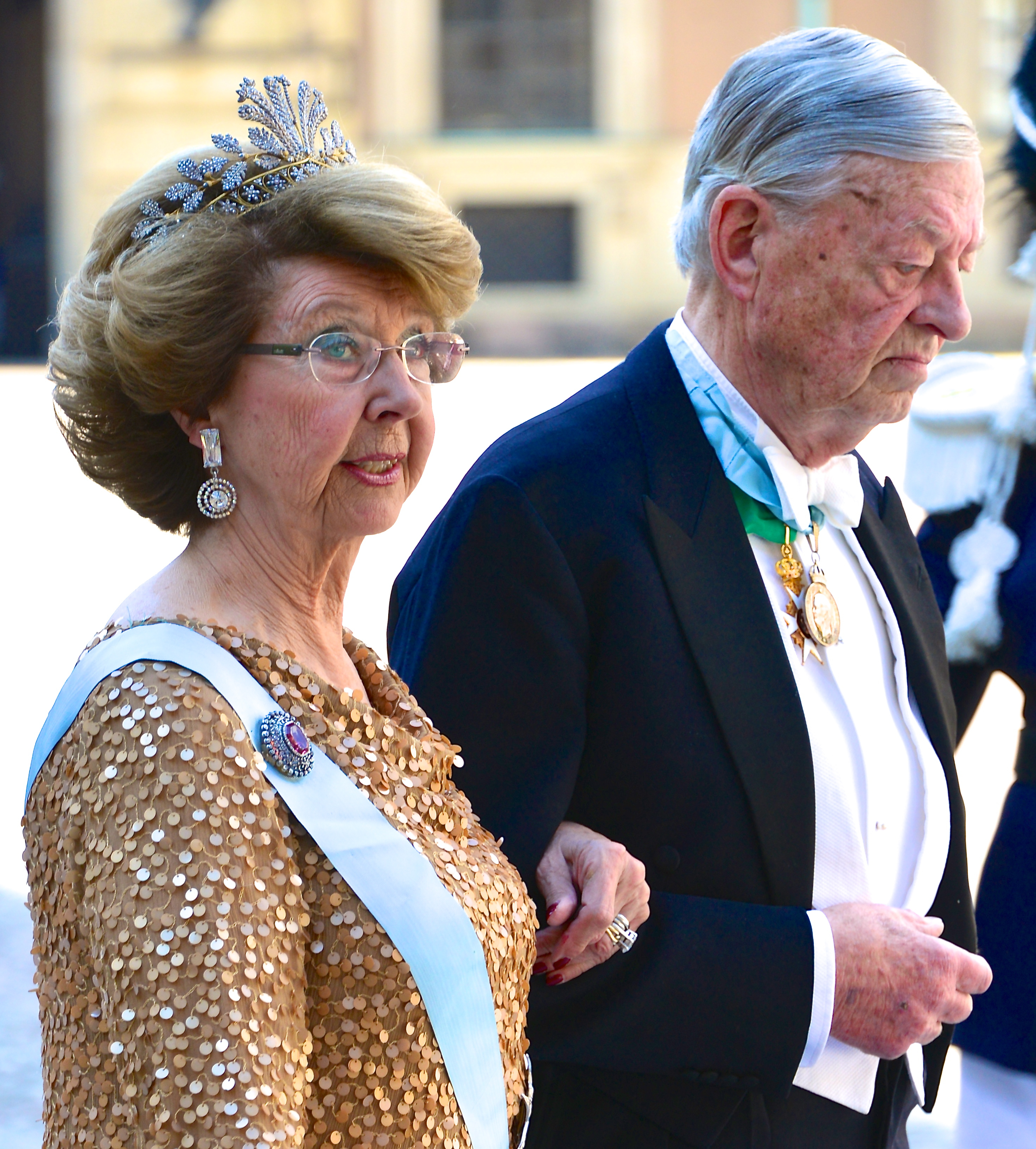
Silfverschiöld and Princess Désirée at the wedding of their niece, Princess Madeleine, 8 June 2013

In 1966, his wife's grandfather, King Gustaf VI Adolf, appointed him a Commander of the Royal Order of Vasa (KVO). The Silfverschiölds maintained a low profile but attended major royal events in a semi-official capacity. He often hosted his brother-in-law, King Carl XVI Gustaf, and King Harald V of Norway at Koberg during hunting season.

Silfverschiöld died on 11 April 2017, aged 82. The King published a message of condolence to his sister. His funeral was held on 11 May 2017 at Erska Church. The Swedish royal family and Princess Märtha Louise of Norway attended. Hovsångare Loa Falkman performed Så skimrande var aldrig havet.

== Titles, styles, honours and arms ==
=== Titles and styles ===
As a friherre (baron) in the Swedish nobility, Silfverschiöld was entitled to the honorific Högvälboren (High Well-born).

=== Honours ===
==== Swedish honours ====
- 1966: Commander of the Royal Order of Vasa (KVO)
- 29 August 1967: King Gustaf VI Adolf's Commemorative Medal
- 1992: His Majesty The King's Medal, 12th size in gold on the Royal Order of the Seraphim ribbon
- 30 April 1996: King Carl XVI Gustaf's Jubilee Commemorative Medal I
- 8 June 2010: Crown Princess Victoria and Prince Daniel's Wedding Commemorative Medal
- 23 August 2013: King Carl XVI Gustaf's Jubilee Commemorative Medal II
- 30 April 2016: King Carl XVI Gustaf's Jubilee Commemorative Medal III

==== Foreign honours ====
- Luxembourg:
  - Grand Officer of the Order of Civil and Military Merit of Adolph of Nassau

=== Arms ===
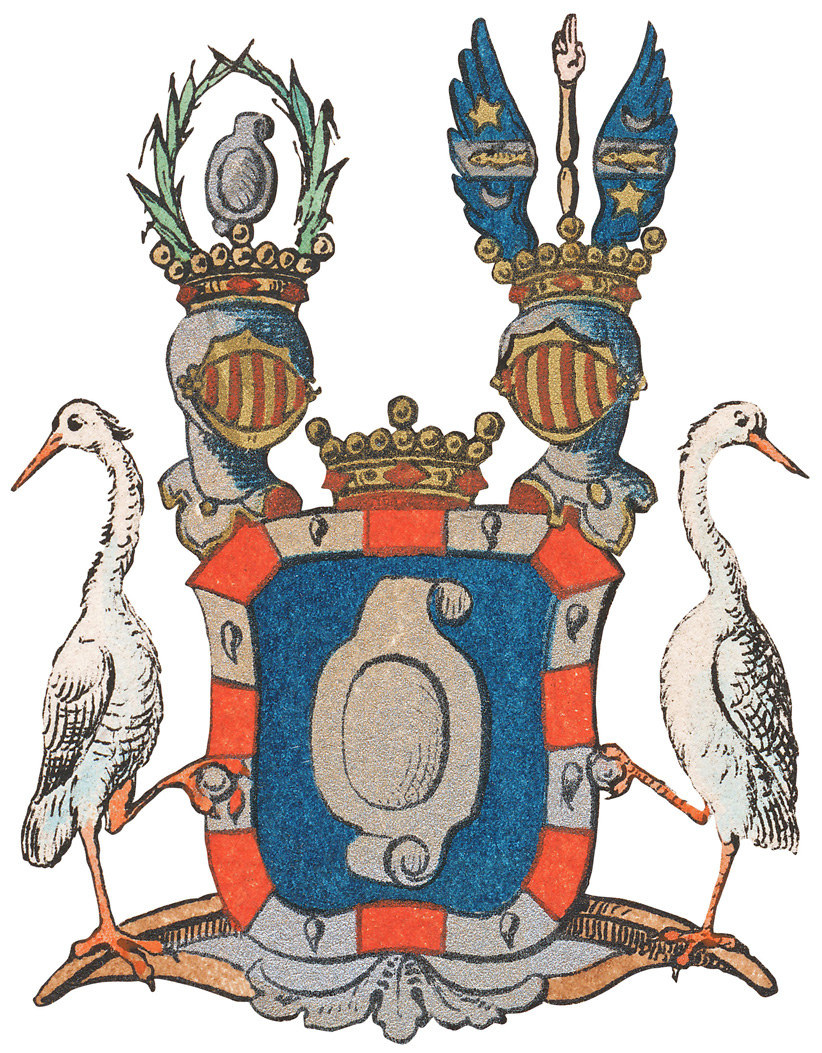
Arms of the Silfverschiöld family
