= Order of the Amaranth =

Masonic-affiliated organization

The Order of the Amaranth is a Masonic-affiliated organization for Master Masons and their Ladies founded in 1873. Members of the Order must be age 18 and older; men must be Master Masons; and women must be related to a master mason, have been and active member of the International Order of the Rainbow for Girls or Job's Daughters International for more than three years, or sponsored by two master masons in good standing if the previous requirements have not been met.

Amaranth was based on the Order of Amarante created by Queen Christina of Sweden on 6 January 1653 for ladies and knights. It lasted only to 1654 when Christina of Sweden abdicated.

In 1860, James B. Taylor of Newark, New Jersey drew upon Queen Christina's order to create a new fraternal society. In 1873, Robert Macoy organized Taylor's society into the Order of the Amaranth, part of a proposed Adoptive Rite of Masonry. Eastern Star was to be the first degree, and Amaranth the third. Amaranth members were required to be members of the Order of the Eastern Star until 1921, when each became their own separate organizations.

In the Order's teachings, the members are emphatically reminded of their duties to God, to their country and to their fellow beings. They are urged to portray, by precept and example, their belief in the "Golden Rule" and by conforming to the virtues inherent in TRUTH, FAITH, WISDOM and CHARITY they can prove to others the goodness promulgated by the Order.

Amaranth is organized into local Courts, under Grand Courts at the State level. The primary body is called the Supreme Council. Some local courts fall under jurisidction of the Supreme Council if no Grand Court is active in their region. Women members of the Order are addressed as "Honored Lady", while men are referred to as "Sir Knight".

== Officers ==
The officers of a Court are:

- Royal Matron – presiding officer
- Royal Patron – assists the Royal Matron
- Associate Matron – assumes the duties of the Royal Matron in the absence of that officer
- Associate Patron – assumes the duties of the Royal Patron in the absence of that officer
- Secretary
- Treasurer
- Conductress – leads candidates through the degree of the order
- Associate Conductress – assists the conductress
- Prelate – leads the Court in prayer
- Historian – keeps the historical records of the Court
- Marshal in the East – escorts the Royal Matron and displays the flag of the country
- Marshal in the West – assists the Marshal in the East
- Musician – provides music at meetings
- Ladies of the Square:
  - Truth
  - Faith
  - Wisdom
  - Charity
- Standard Bearer – displays the banner of the Order
- Trustees:
  - Chairman of the Trustees
  - 2 year Trustee
  - 3 year Trustee
- Warder – Sits next to the door inside the meeting room, to make sure those that enter the court room are members of the Order.
- Sentinel – Sits next to the door outside the court room, to make sure those that wish to enter are members of the Order.

The Royal Matron, Royal Patron, Associate Matron, Associate Patron, Secretary, Treasurer, Conductress, Associate Conductress and the Trustees are elected by the members of the Court. All are elected annually with the exception of the Trustees, who serve three-year terms. One Trustee is elected each year, with the senior Trustee serving as Chairman. The remaining officers are appointed each year by the Royal Matron-elect prior to installation. The elected officers – excluding Secretary, Treasurer and Trustees – are considered line officers and normally advance to the next office the following year: Associate Conductress becoming Conductress, Conductress becoming Associate Matron and so forth. These advancements are not automatic, however, and are subject to the affirmative vote of the members.

The order's primary philanthropic project is the Amaranth Diabetes Foundation. In the time that the order has been partnered with the Foundation, over $17,000,000 has been donated, funding many research projects. The insulin pump for diabetics is one such example of a project that received Amaranth funds. Additional projects may be designated by individual Grand jurisdictions and/or the local courts. The flag of the appropriate country is prominently displayed at all meetings.

== Grand Order of the Amaranth ==
In 1760, a still extant Grand Order of the Amaranth was founded in Sweden, unrelated to freemasonry, with seven degrees. Today, it hosts a high-society biannual ball.
