= William Hutchinson (topographer) =

English lawyer, antiquary and topographer

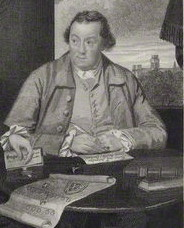
Engraving of William Hutchinson

William James Hutchinson (1732–1814) was an English lawyer, antiquary and topographer.

== Life ==
By 1760 Hutchinson was established as a solicitor in Barnard Castle, County Durham. He was elected Fellow of the Society of Antiquaries on 15 February 1781, and communicated in November 1788 an 'Account of Antiquities in Lancashire' (Archæologia, ix. 211-18). Hutchinson died on 7 April 1814, having survived his wife only two or three days. He left three daughters and a son.

== Works ==
In all his undertakings Hutchinson received assistance from the antiquary George Allan. In 1785 he published the first volume of his History and Antiquities of the County Palatine of Durham, Newcastle, founded on Allan's manuscript collections; the second volume appeared in 1787, and the third in 1794. His work was carried on while he was prosecuting a lawsuit with the publisher; being unable to find purchasers for the thousand copies which he printed, he disposed of four hundred to John Nichols. Another revised edition was issued at Durham in 1823 in 3 vols.

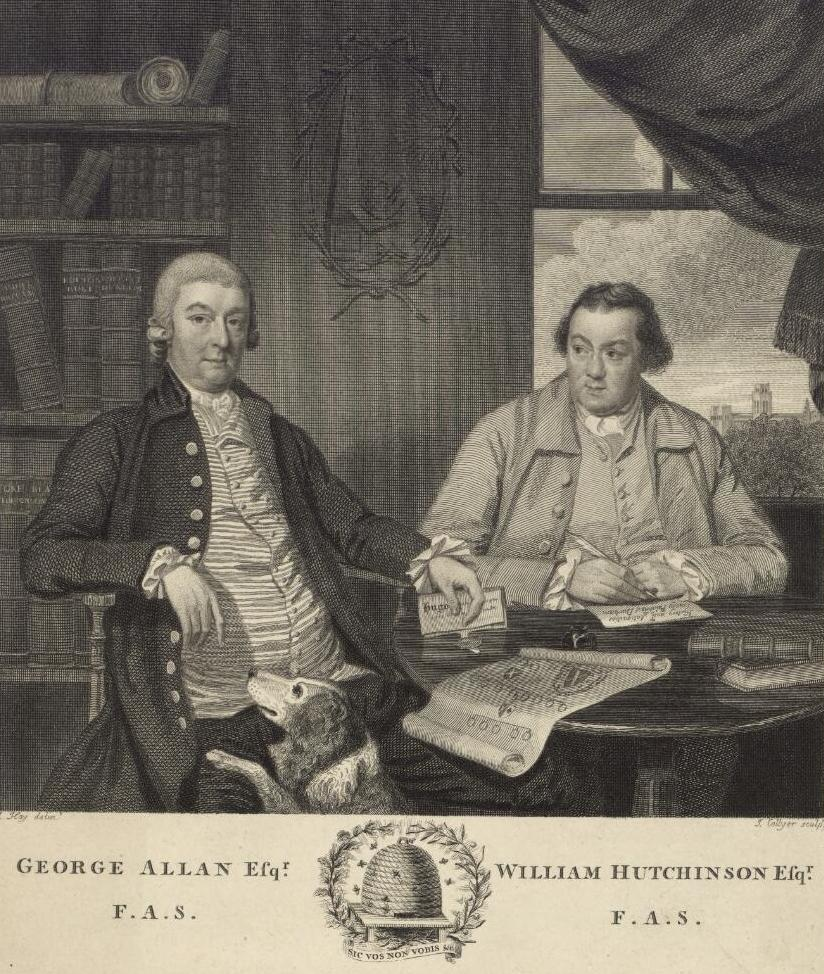
George Allan and William Hutchinson (right), 1814 engraving by Joseph Collyer the Younger.

Hutchinson's other topographical works are:

- An Excursion to the Lakes in Westmoreland and Cumberland, August 1773 [anon.], 1774.
- An Excursion to the Lakes in Westmoreland and Cumberland, with a Tour through part of the Northern Counties in 1773 and 1774, London, 1776.
- A View of Northumberland, with an Excursion to the Abbey of Mailross in Scotland, 2 vols.
- Newcastle, 1776-8.
- The History of the County of Cumberland: And Some Places Adjacent, from the Earliest Accounts to the Present Time: Comprehending the Local History of the County; Its Antiquities, the Origin, Genealogy, and Present State of the Principal Families, with Biographical Notes; Its Mines, Minerals, and Plants, with Other Curiosities, Either of Nature Or of Art ... Carlise: F. Jollie. 1794. 2 vols.

He also edited anonymously Thomas Randal's State of the Churches under the Archdeaconry of Northumberland, and in Hexham Peculiar Jurisdiction (1779?).

In 1788 he composed a tragedy called Pygmalion, King of Tyre, and soon afterwards another named The Tyrant of Orixa. Both plays were submitted to Thomas Harris, the manager of Covent Garden, but neither was staged or printed. A third play written by him, entitled The Princess of Zanfara, after being rejected by Harris, was printed anonymously in 1792, and frequently performed at provincial theatres.

His other writings are:

- The Hermitage; a British Story, 1772.
- The Doubtful Marriage; a Narrative drawn from Characters in Real Life, 3 vols. 1775 (another edit., 1792).
- The Spirit of Masonry, in Moral and Elucidatory Lectures, London, 1775 (other edits., 1796, 1802, and 1843, with notes by George Oliver).
- A Week in a Cottage; a Pastoral Tale, 1776.
- A Romance after the manner of The Castle of Otranto.
- An Oration at the Dedication of Free Mason's Hall in Sunderland on the 16th July 1778.

In 1776 Hutchinson edited a volume of Poetical Remains by his brother Robert, who had died in November 1773. It was printed at George Allan's private press at Darlington, which also put out many of Hutchinson's Addresses to his subscribers.

He left in manuscript The Pilgrim of the Valley of Hecass; a Tale, and a volume of Letters addressed to the Minister, 1798, by, "Freeholder North of Trent". He had also prepared a copy of his History of Durham, corrected for a second edition, and a Poetical Sketch of his own life.

== Freemasonry ==
He was initiated into Freemasonry on 4 June 1770 where he eventually became the Worshipful Master of Barnard Castle Lodge of Concord. He was also founding Master of Lodge No. 461 in Raby. His book, the Spirit of Masonry (1775), gained him the title of "father of masonic symbolism". The book received the sanction of the Grand Lodge of England and went through nine editions during his lifetime.
