= Wellins Calcott =

Wellins Calcott (fl. 1756–1769), was a British Christian author and Freemason.

== Biography ==
Calcott was a native of Shropshire, the son of Matthew Calcott, a member of the corporation of Shrewsbury. In 1756, he published the book Thoughts, Moral and Divine, issued in London. According to the preface, he was induced to become an author by reverses of fortune. He published it by subscription and was enabled thereby to make advances towards a restoration of a settled life. A second edition was brought out at Birmingham in 1758; a third at Coventry in 1759; a fourth at Manchester in 1761; a fifth at Exeter (retitled A collection of thoughts...) in 1764 and a sixth at London in 1766.

In 1769 he published A Candid Disquisition of the Principles and Practices of the most ancient and honourable Society of Free and Accepted Masons, London, 8vo, also by subscription. This work is said to have been the means of leading many persons to join the society. It was reprinted in 1847 by Dr. George Oliver, who considered it the 'gem of the period’ in which it was written.

According to a Freemason encyclopaedia Calcott travelled extensively (also suggested by the range of places where his book was published) and spent time in America. He was apparently still alive in 1779.
