= Princess Christina, Mrs. Magnuson =

Swedish princess (born 1943)

Princess Christina
- Mrs. Magnuson
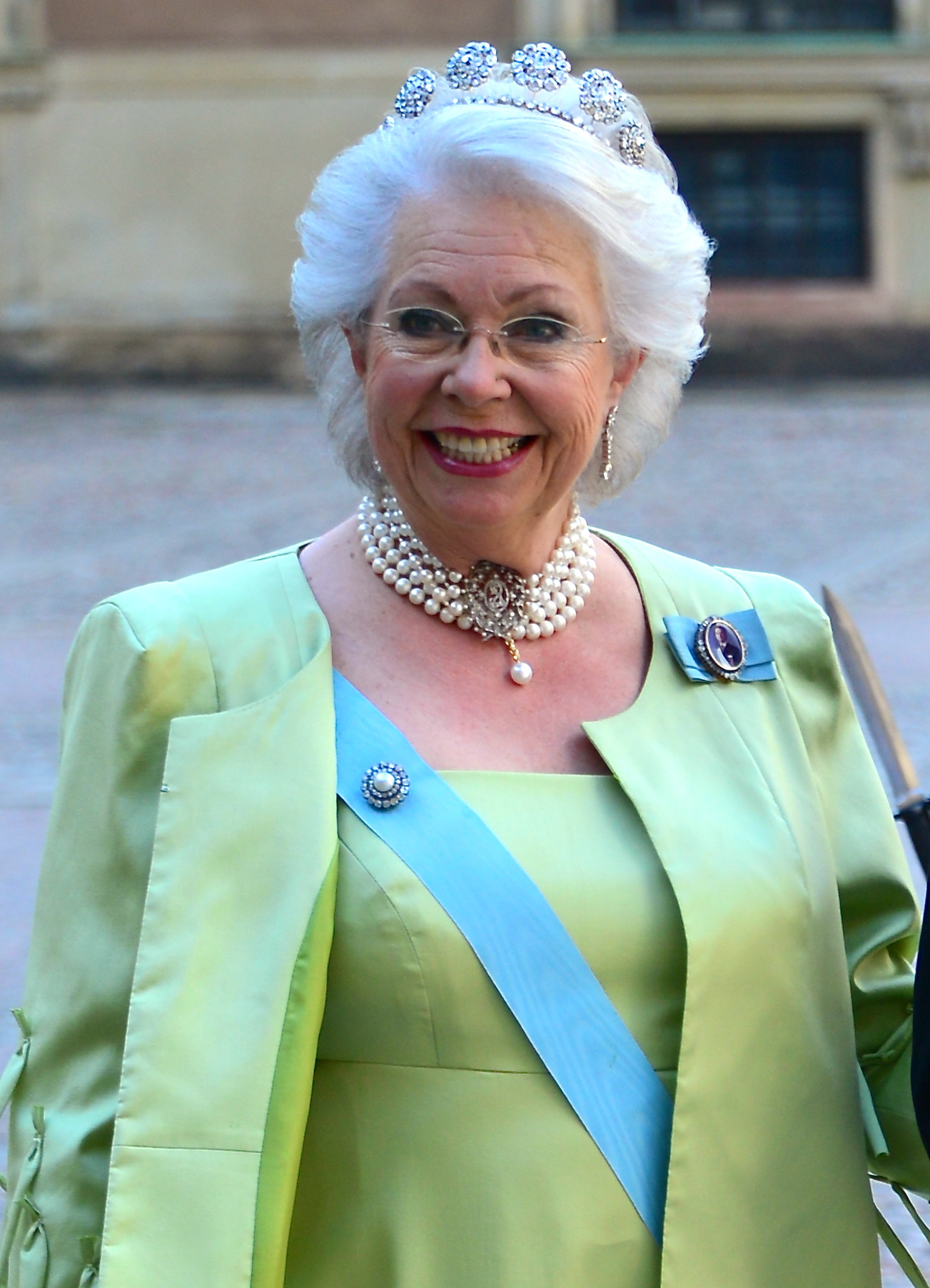
- Christina in 2013
- Born: 3 August 1943 (age 83); Haga Palace, Solna, Sweden
- Spouse: Tord Magnuson (m. 1974)
- Issue: Gustaf Magnuson; Oscar Magnuson; Victor Magnuson
Names
- Christina Louise Helena Magnuson
- House: Bernadotte
- Father: Prince Gustaf Adolf, Duke of Västerbotten
- Mother: Princess Sibylla of Saxe-Coburg and Gotha

Princess Christina, Mrs. Magnuson, LoK av KMO (Christina Louise Helena; born 3 August 1943) is a member of the Swedish royal family. She is the fourth child of Prince Gustaf Adolf, Duke of Västerbotten, and Princess Sibylla of Saxe-Coburg and Gotha, and the youngest of the four older sisters of King Carl XVI Gustaf. She uses the name Christina Magnuson in a professional capacity.

== Early life ==
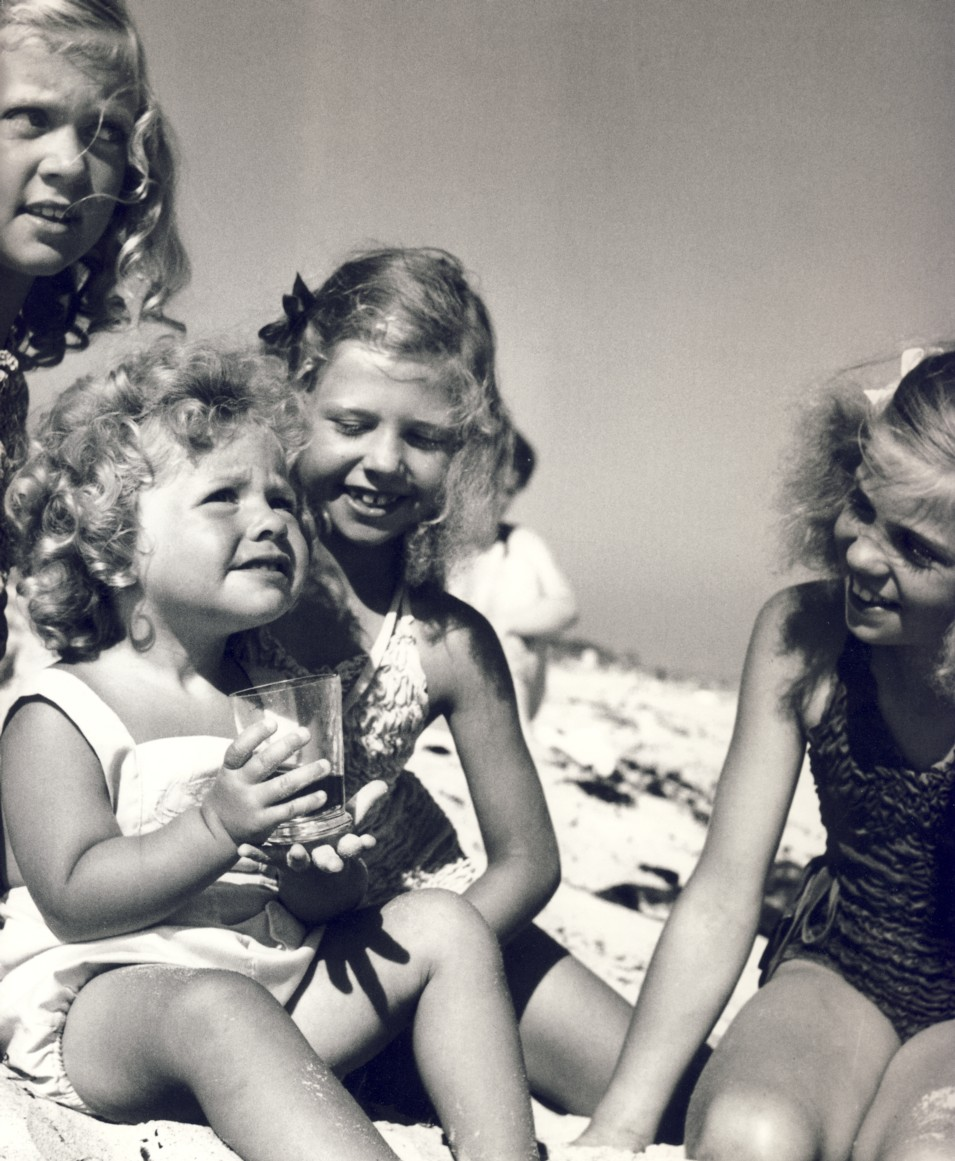
Christina (in front) at play with her sisters in 1945.

Christina was born at Haga Palace outside Stockholm as the fourth child and youngest daughter of Prince Gustaf Adolf, Duke of Västerbotten, and Princess Sibylla of Saxe-Coburg-Gotha. She served as bridesmaid at the 1961 civil wedding of her sister Princess Birgitta to Prince Johann Georg of Hohenzollern as well as at the 1964 wedding of her cousin Princess Anne-Marie of Denmark to King Constantine II of Greece.

She was educated at Franska Skolan in Stockholm. Subsequently, she underwent studies at Radcliffe College in Cambridge, Massachusetts, and as the only one of her siblings, she obtained a university degree in art history from Stockholm University.

== Public life ==
Between her grandfather King Gustaf VI Adolf's death in 1973 and her brother's wedding to Silvia Sommerlath in 1976, Christina effectively served as Sweden's first lady. As a result of this, she also maintained a public role within the royal family after her marriage in 1974, unlike her older sisters.

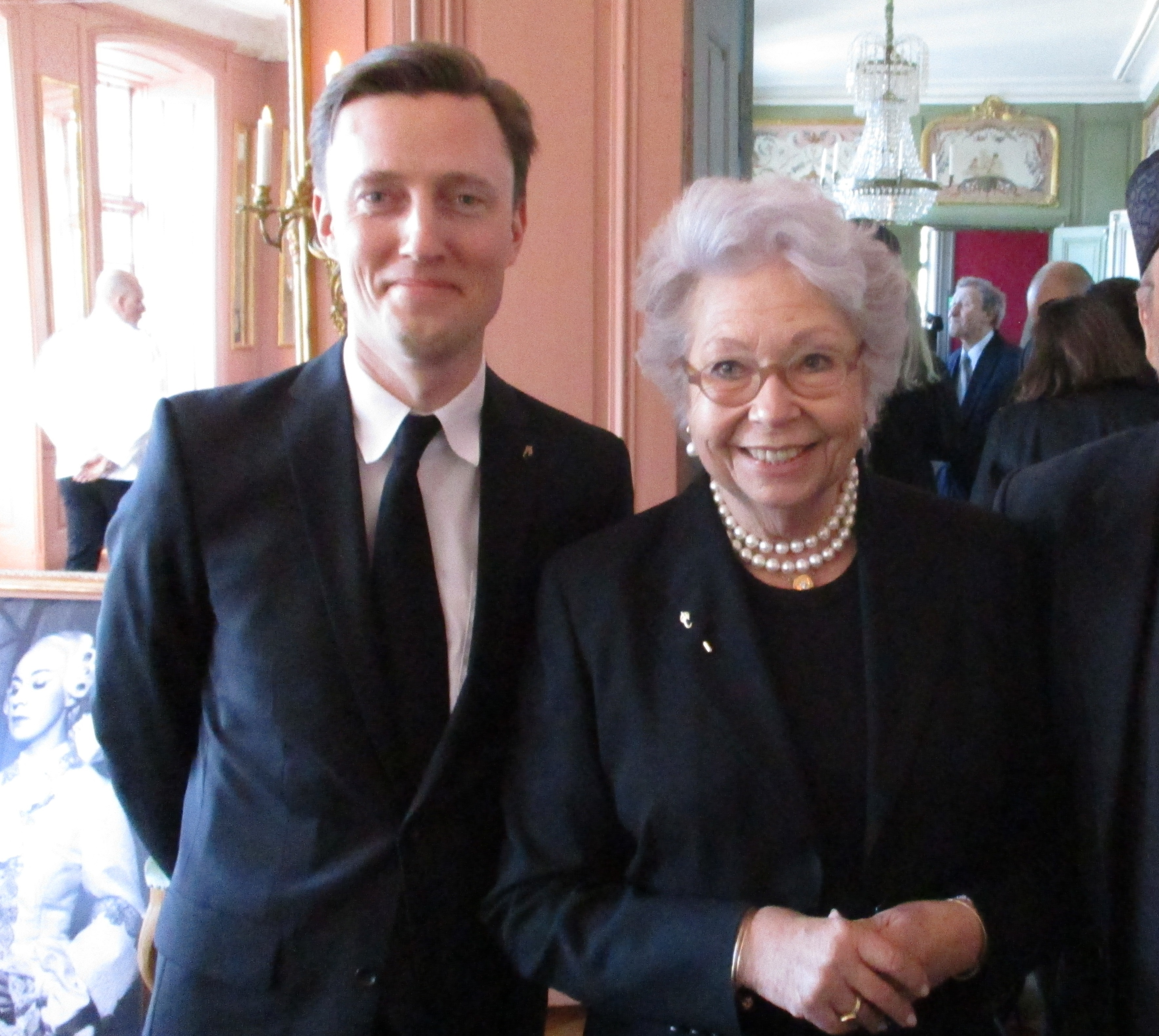
Magnuson with the Ulriksdal theatre's manager in 2018

Christina chaired the Swedish Red Cross for nine years between 1993 and 2002. Through her friendship with Kjerstin Dellert, she has been chairman of the Ulriksdal Palace Theatre's Friendship Society for several years.

Christina has co-authored several books – among them biographies about her grandmother, Princess Margaret of Connaught, and ancestress Josephine of Leuchtenberg.

In January 2023, the princess was seen and heard commenting extensively throughout a two-part documentary broadcast by Sweden's national public service Sveriges Television about the last three kings of Sweden: her brother, grandfather and great-grandfather.

The princess has publicly condemned the Russian invasion of Ukraine calling it unacceptable and accusing Russia of committing war crimes.

== Marriage and children ==
She met her future husband, business executive Tord Magnuson, at a lunch in Stockholm in 1961. Her engagement to Magnuson was announced on 1 February 1974. They were married on 15 June 1974 in the Palace Church of the Royal Palace of Stockholm.

The couple has three sons:

- Carl Gustaf Victor Magnuson (born on 8 August 1975), godfather of Prince Nicolas of Sweden. He married Vicky Elisabeth Andrén (born on 25 January 1983) in 2013 but were divorced in 2020. They have one daughter:
  - Désirée Elfrida Christina Magnuson (born on 11 July 2014), a goddaughter of Crown Princess Victoria of Sweden
- Tord Oscar Fredrik Magnuson (born on 20 June 1977), godfather of Prince Oscar of Sweden. He married Emelia "Emma" Charlotta Ledent (born on 18 April 1981) in 2011. They have two sons:
  - Carl Albert Maurice Magnuson (born on 10 February 2013)
  - Henry Guy Tord Magnuson (born on 16 October 2015)
- Victor Edmund Lennart Magnuson (born 10 September 1980), godfather of Prince Alexander of Sweden. He married Frida Louise Bergström (born on 18 February 1980) in 2017. They have two sons:
  - Edmund Bengt Lennart Magnuson (born on 11 December 2012)
  - Sigvard Hans Gösta Magnuson (born on 25 August 2015)

Christina is the godmother of her niece, Princess Madeleine, and Prince Joachim of Denmark, son of her first cousin, Queen Margrethe II.

== Health ==
In October 2016, it was announced that Magnuson has been diagnosed with chronic leukemia. It was later made known that she had been cured following stem cell treatment.

== Honours ==
=== National honours ===
- Sweden: Member and Commander of the Royal Order of the Seraphim (LoK av KMO)
- Sweden: Member of the Royal Family Decoration of King Gustaf VI Adolf, 1st Class
- Sweden: Member of the Royal Family Decoration of King Carl XVI Gustaf, 2nd Class
- Sweden: Recipient of the Kings Medal, Special Class
- Sweden: Recipient of the Prince Carl Medal
- Sweden: Recipient of the 90th Birthday Medal of King Gustav V
- Sweden: Recipient of the Commemorative Medal of King Gustav V
- Sweden: Recipient of the 85th Birthday Medal of King Gustaf VI Adolf
- Sweden: Recipient of the 50th Birthday Medal of King Carl XVI Gustaf
- Sweden: Recipient of the Wedding Medal of Crown Princess Victoria to Daniel Westling
- Sweden: Recipient of the Ruby Jubilee Medal of King Carl XVI Gustaf
- Sweden: Recipient of the 70th Birthday Medal of King Carl XVI Gustaf
- Sweden: Recipient of the Golden Jubilee Badge Medal of King Carl XVI Gustaf

=== Foreign honours ===
- Argentina: Grand Cross of the Order of the Liberator General San Martín
- Denmark: Knight of the Order of the Elephant
- Finland: Grand Cross of the Order of the White Rose (23 April 2024)
- France: Commander of the National Order of the Legion of Honour
- Germany: Grand Cross 1st Class of the Order of Merit of the Federal Republic of Germany
- Iceland: Grand Cross of the Order of the Falcon
- Italy: Knight Grand Cross of the Order of Merit of the Italian Republic
- Japan: Grand Cordon (Paulownia) of the Order of the Precious Crown
- Netherlands: Grand Cross of the Order of the Crown (11 October 2022)
- Norway: Grand Cross of the Royal Norwegian Order of Saint Olav
- Portugal: Grand Cross of the Military Order of Christ
- Yugoslavia: Star and Sash of the Order of the Yugoslav Great Star

=== Awards ===
- Sweden: Member Grand Cross of the Social Grand Order of the Amaranth
- Sweden: Member Grand Cross of the Social Order of Innocence
- (International Federation of Red Cross and Red Crescent Societies) International Red Cross and Red Crescent: Recipient of the Henry Dunant Medal

== Ancestry ==
Ancestors of Princess Christina, Mrs. Magnuson

8. Gustaf V of Sweden
4. Gustaf VI Adolf of Sweden
9. Princess Victoria of Baden
2. Prince Gustaf Adolf, Duke of Västerbotten
10. Prince Arthur, Duke of Connaught and Strathearn
5. Princess Margaret of Connaught
11. Princess Louise Margaret of Prussia
1. Princess Christina of Sweden
12. Prince Leopold, Duke of Albany
6. Charles Edward, Duke of Saxe-Coburg and Gotha
13. Princess Helena of Waldeck and Pyrmont
3. Princess Sibylla of Saxe-Coburg and Gotha
14. Friedrich Ferdinand, Duke of Schleswig-Holstein
7. Princess Victoria Adelaide of Schleswig-Holstein-Sonderburg-Glücksburg
15. Princess Karoline Mathilde of Schleswig-Holstein-Sonderburg-Augustenburg
