= George Oliver (freemason) =

English cleric, schoolmaster, topographer and writer on freemasonry

George Oliver, D.D. (1782–1867) was an English cleric, schoolmaster, topographer, and writer on freemasonry.

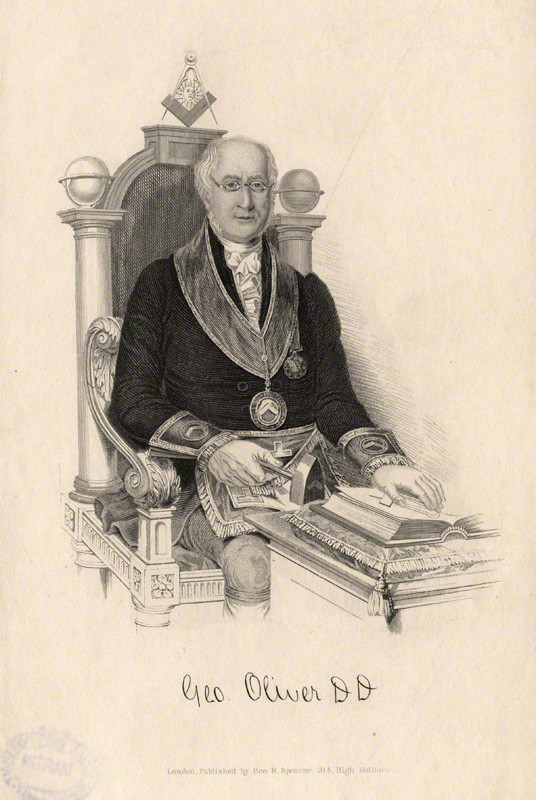
George Oliver

== Life ==
He was eldest son of Samuel Oliver, rector of Lambley, Nottinghamshire, by Elizabeth, daughter of George Whitehead, of Blyth Spital in the same county. He was born at Papplewick, Nottinghamshire, on 5 November 1782, and, after receiving a liberal education at Nottingham, he became in 1803 second master of Caistor grammar school. Six years afterwards he was appointed to the headmastership of Grimsby grammar school.

Oliver was ordained deacon in 1813, and priest in 1814; and in July 1815 Bishop George Pretyman Tomline collated him to the living of Clee, when his name was placed on the boards of Trinity College, Cambridge, by Dr Bayley, subdean of Lincoln and examining chaplain to the bishop, as a ten-year man. In 1831 Bishop John Kaye gave him the rectory of Scopwick, Lincolnshire, which he held till his death. A Lambeth degree of D.D. was conferred on him 25 July 1835.

From 1834 to 1846 Oliver was perpetual curate of St Peter's Collegiate Church, Wolverhampton. He was also domestic chaplain to Lord Kensington. He had been appointed Deputy Provincial Grand Master of Lincolnshire in 1832, and in 1840 he was appointed an honorary member of the Grand Lodge of Massachusetts, with the rank of deputy grand master.

In 1846 Lord Lyndhurst, the Lord Chancellor, conferred on Oliver the rectory of South Hyckham, Lincolnshire, in return for vacating the curacy of Wolverhampton. In 1854 his voice began to fail, and, confiding the charge of his parishes to curates, he passed the remainder of his life in seclusion at Lincoln. He died there on 3 March 1867, and was buried with Masonic rites on the 7th, in the cemetery attached to the church of St. Swithin.

== Works ==
Oliver's topographical and theological works are:

- A Vindication of the Fundamental Doctrines of Christianity against the Attacks of Deism and Infidelity, in a Series of Pastoral Addresses, Great Grimsby [1820?].
- The Monumental Antiquities of Great Grimsby: an Essay towards ascertaining its Origin and Ancient Population, Hull, 1825.
- The History and Antiquities of the Conventual Church of St. James, Great Grimsby, Grimsby, 1829.
- The History and Antiquities of the Town and Minster of Beverley, in the County of York, with Historical and Descriptive Sketches of the Abbeys of Watton and Meaux, the Convent of Haltemprise, the Villages, and the Hamlets comprised within the Liberties of Beverley, Beverley, 1829.
- An Historical and Descriptive Account of the Collegiate Church of Wolverhampton, in the County of Stafford, Wolverhampton [1836].
- History of the Trinity Guild at Sleaford, with an Account of its Miracle Plays, Religious Mysteries, and Shows, as practised in the Fifteenth Century.... To which is added an Appendix detailing the Traditions which still prevail, and a Description of the Lincoln Pageants exhibited during the Visit of King James to that City, Lincoln, 1837.
- Jacob's Ladder: the Ascent to Heaven plainly pointed out, in eighteen practical Addresses, London, 1845.
- An Account of the Religious Houses formerly situated on the eastern side of the River Witham, London, 1846.
- The existing Remains of the Ancient Britons within a small District lying between Lincoln and Sleaford, London, 1846.
- Ye Byrde of Gryme: an Apologue, Grimsby, 1866. A history of Grimsby.

His masonic works are:

- The Antiquities of Free-Masonry, comprising Illustrations of the five grand Periods of Masonry, from the Creation of the World to the Dedication of Solomon's Temple, London, 1823 and 1843.
- The Star in the East, 1825; new edition, 1842.
- Signs and Symbols illustrated and explained in a Course of Twelve Lectures on Freemasonry, Grimsby, 1826; reprinted London, 1837, and again 1857.
- The History of Initiation, comprising a detailed Account of the Rites, Ceremonies, &c., of all the Secret Institutions of the Ancient World. London, 1829 and 1841.
- The theocratic Philosophy of Freemasonry, London, 1840, and 1856.
- History of Freemasonry, 1841.
- Brief History of the Witham Lodge, Lincoln, London, 1841.
- Historical Landmarks and other Evidences of Freemasonry, 2 vols. London, 1844-6.
- An Apology for the Freemasons, London, 1846.
- The Insignia of the Royal Arch Degree illustrated and explained, London, 1847.
- The Golden Remains of the Early Masonic Writers, illustrating the Institutes of the Order, 5 vols. London, 1847–50.
- Some Account of the Schism which took place during the last Century among the Free and Accepted Masons in England, showing the presumed Origin of the Royal Arch Degree, 1847.
- A Mirror for the Johannite Masons, 1848.
- Institutes of Masonic Jurisprudence; being an Exemplification of the English Book of Constitutions, London, 1849; reprinted in 1859 and 1874.
- Book of the Lodge, or Officer's Manual, London, 1849; 2nd ed., to which was added A Century of Aphorisms, 1856; 3rd ed. 1864; 4th ed. 1879.
- The Symbol of Glory, shewing the Object and End of Free-Masonry, London, 1850.
- Dictionary of Symbolical Masonry, 1853.
- The Revelations of a Square, exhibiting a Graphic Display of the Sayings and Doings of eminent Free and Accepted Masons, London, 1855, with curious engravings.
- Freemason's Treasury, 1863.
- Papal Teachings in Freemasonry, 1866.
- The Origin of the Royal Arch Order of Masonry, 1867.
- The Pythagorean Triangle, or the Science of Numbers, 1875.
- Discrepancies of Freemasonry, 1875.

Oliver also edited:

- the fourteenth edition of Illustrations of Masonry, by William Preston, "bringing the History of Freemasonry down to 1829", London, 1829, 16th ed. 1840, 16th ed. 1849;
- Jonathan Ashe's Masonic Manual, 1843, and again 1870; and
- William Hutchinson's Spirit of Masonry, 1843.

He reprinted A Candid Disquisition of the Principles and Practices of the most ancient and honourable Society of Free and Accepted Masons (1769) by Wellins Calcott. Plays by Oliver were put on, anonymously, by the theatre manager Joseph Smedley, another freemason.

== Family ==
Oliver married in 1805 Mary Ann, youngest daughter of Thomas Beverley, by whom he left five children.

== Notes ==
Attribution

This article incorporates text from a publication now in the public domain: Lee, Sidney, ed. (1895). "Oliver, George (1782-1867)". Dictionary of National Biography. Vol. 42. London: Smith, Elder & Co.
