= Princess Désirée, Baroness Silfverschiöld =

Swedish princess (1938–2026)

Princess Désirée
- Baroness Silfverschiöld
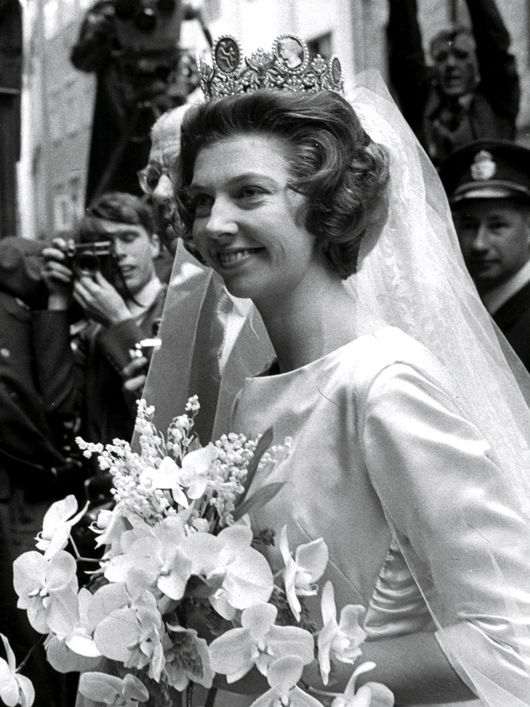
- Princess Désirée at her wedding in 1964
- Born: 2 June 1938; Haga Palace, Solna, Sweden
- Died: 21 January 2026 (aged 87); Koberg Castle, Trollhättan, Sweden
- Burial: 19 February 2026; Koberg Castle, Trollhättan, Sweden
- Spouse: Baron Niclas Silfverschiöld (m. 1964; died 2017)
- Issue: Baron Carl Silfverschiöld; Baroness Christina-Louise Silfverschiöld; Baroness Hélène Silfverschiöld
Names
- Désirée Elisabeth Sibylla Silfverschiöld
- House: Bernadotte
- Father: Prince Gustaf Adolf, Duke of Västerbotten
- Mother: Princess Sibylla of Saxe-Coburg and Gotha

Princess Désirée, Baroness Silfverschiöld (Désirée Elisabeth Sibylla; 2 June 1938 – 21 January 2026) was the third child of Prince Gustaf Adolf and Princess Sibylla of Sweden, Duke and Duchess of Västerbotten, and an elder sister of King Carl XVI Gustaf.

== Early life ==
Désirée was born on 2 June 1938 as the third daughter and child of Prince Gustaf Adolf, Duke of Västerbotten (son of Crown Prince Gustaf Adolf of Sweden and his wife, Princess Margaret of Connaught), and his wife, Princess Sibylla of Saxe-Coburg and Gotha (daughter of Prince Charles Edward, Duke of Saxe-Coburg and Gotha and his wife, Princess Victoria Adelaide of Schleswig-Holstein).

She was christened on 30 June at Solna Church in the Solna Municipality of Stockholm, Sweden. She was given the names: Desiree, after her ancestor Queen Desideria; and Sibylla, after her mother, Princess Sibylla. She grew up at the family home, Haga Palace, outside Stockholm, with her three sisters; together they were known as the Haga Princesses.

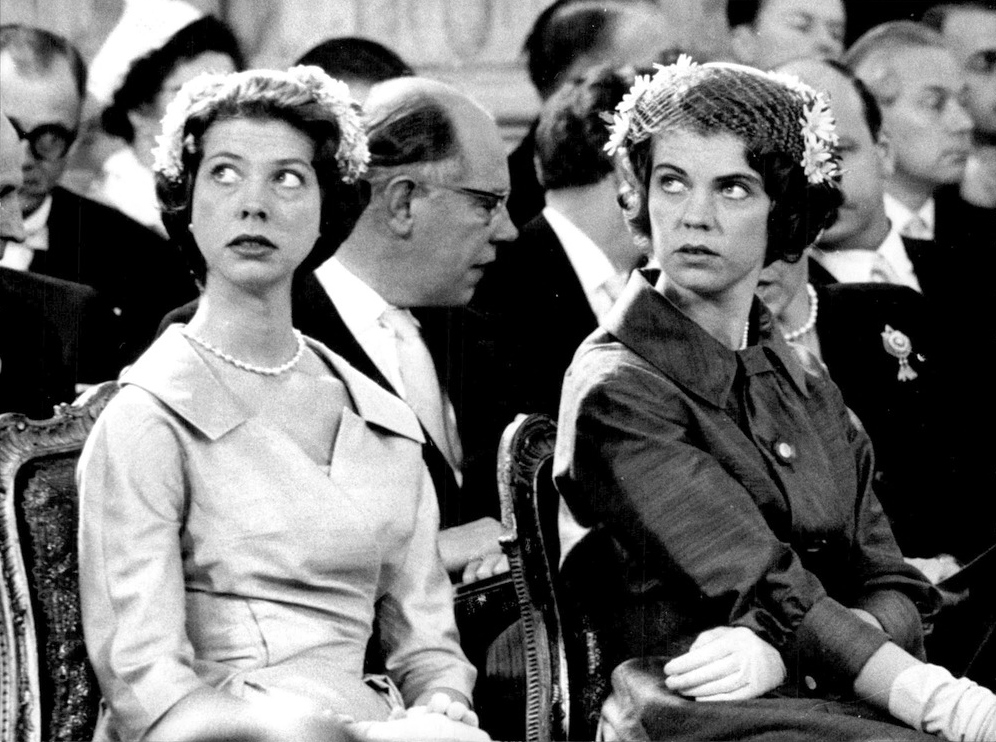
Princess Désirée (left) with her sister Princess Margaretha in 1959

In November 1960, Désirée accompanied her elder sister Princess Birgitta for a visit to the United States on behalf of their grandfather King Gustaf VI Adolf for the 50th anniversary of The American-Scandinavian Foundation. In their honour a ball was organised for the two princesses at the Renaissance Blackstone Hotel in Chicago by Mayor Richard Daley.

Désirée, like her sisters, attended the Franska Skolan in Stockholm and later studied French in Switzerland. She completed a textiles degree at Konstfack (University College of Arts, Crafts and Design) and trained as a preschool teacher. She worked for a short period as a preschool teacher on Kungsholmen in Stockholm.

She fell in love with Greger Lewenhaupt, elder brother of King Carl XVI Gustaf's friend Carl Adam "Noppe" Lewenhaupt, but before they became engaged, Greger Lewenhaupt died in a skiing accident in 1960.

In 2011, Désirée was 306th in the line of succession to the British throne.

== Marriage and children ==
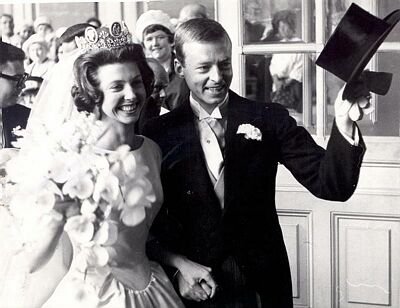
Silfverschiöld and Princess Désirée on their wedding day, 5 June 1964

Désirée's engagement to Baron Nils-August Otto Carl Niclas Silfverschiöld, (1934–2017) was announced on 18 December 1963, and the couple married on 5 June 1964 in Storkyrkan in Stockholm. As a result of her non-royal marriage, she lost her style of Royal Highness and her position as a princess of Sweden, but was given the courtesy Princess Désirée, Baroness Silfverschiöld by the King. Under the Swedish constitution of that time, she, as a woman, and her descendants were not eligible to inherit the throne, and when this was later changed to absolute primogeniture the right of succession was limited to the descendants of her brother, King Carl XVI Gustaf.

Désirée wore the same ivory satin wedding gown that her older sister, Princess Birgitta, had worn in 1961. The gown, made by the Swedish fashion atelier Marthaskolan, featured a rounded neckline, three-quarter length sleeves, a full skirt, and a long train. She complemented the gown with the Swedish Royal Family's Cameo Tiara, a historic piece that entered the Swedish royal collection via Queen Josephine of Sweden and Norway. Princess Désirée also wore a lace veil that had belonged to her grandmother, Princess Margaret of Connaught.

Désirée and her husband had three children:

- Baron Carl Otto Edmund Silfverschiöld (born 22 March 1965 in Gothenburg), married Maria Gunilla Fredriksson (born 12 April 1965 in Malmö) in 2005 and has one daughter.
- Baroness Christina Louise Ewa Madeleine Silfverschiöld (born 29 September 1966 in Gothenburg), married Baron Hans Louis Gerard de Geer af Finspång (born 26 January 1963 in Stockholm) in 1999 and has three children.
- Baroness Hélène Ingeborg Sibylla Silfverschiöld (born 20 September 1968 in Gothenburg), who served as bridesmaid at the 1976 weddings of her uncle King Carl XVI Gustaf and granduncle Prince Bertil. In her relationship with Fredrik Dieterle she has one son.

Following her marriage, Désirée lived in the Silfverschiöld family's home at Koberg Castle and at Gåsevadholm Castle in Halland. She was the godmother of her niece, Crown Princess Victoria.

== Later life and death ==
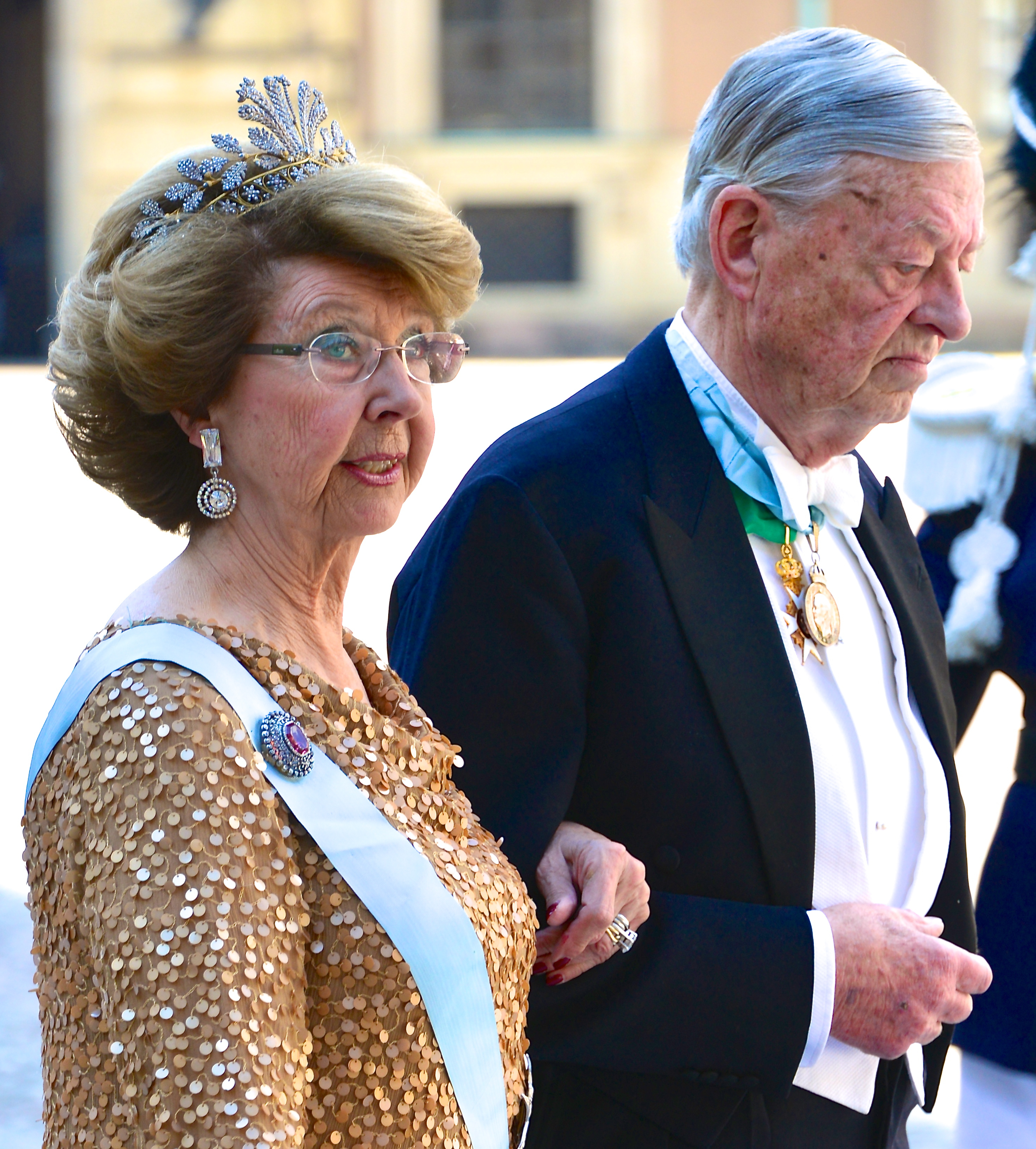
Désirée and Silfverschiöld at the wedding of her niece, Princess Madeleine, 8 June 2013

After her marriage to Baron Niclas Silfverschiöld in 1964, Désirée moved to the Silfverschiöld family estate at Koberg Castle in Västergötland, where the couple raised their three children. In 1975, she participated in a reception at Stockholm Palace welcoming Finnish president Urho Kekkonen during his state visit to Sweden. Désirée was godmother to her niece, Crown Princess Victoria, who was baptised at the Royal Chapel of Stockholm Palace on 27 September 1977. In 1980, she stood in for Queen Silvia at the Nobel Prize banquet when the Queen was ill. In 1985, she presented the Hasselblad Award to photographer Irving Penn.

Over the following decades, Désirée occasionally participated in inaugurations and other public events in her home region, including at Läckö Castle, Gräfsnäs and Stora Levene, and she and Niclas Silfverschiöld frequently hosted the annual royal hunts at Halleberg and Hunneberg. In 1994, Désirée presented Queen Silvia's Cup at Åbytravet in Mölndal. In 2000, she and Niclas received Emperor Akihito and Empress Michiko of Japan during their state visit to Sweden. She lived a relatively private life but occasionally attended Nobel Prize festivities and other public royal events in a semi-official capacity, sometimes wearing tiaras and jewellery belonging to the royal family.

She attended the wedding of Crown Princess Victoria and Daniel Westling in 2010, as well as the weddings of Princess Madeleine and Christopher O'Neill in 2013 and Prince Carl Philip and Sofia Hellqvist in 2015. In 2016, she attended celebrations marking King Carl XVI Gustaf's 70th birthday, and in 2017 she attended her sister Princess Birgitta's 80th birthday celebrations. She was widowed in 2017 following the death of Niclas Silfverschiöld.

In 2022, Désirée suffered from meningitis and was hospitalised at Sahlgrenska University Hospital in Gothenburg for an extended period. In September 2023, her sister Princess Birgitta said that Désirée had difficulty walking following the illness. In December 2024, Désirée travelled to Stockholm for the funeral of Princess Birgitta, one of her last public appearances.

Désirée died at her home in Koberg Castle, Västergötland, Sweden, on 21 January 2026, at the age of 87. Her funeral was held on 19 February in the Royal Chapel at the Royal Palace, followed by burial at Koberg. As Désirée was a member of the Order of the Seraphim, the Seraphim Toll at Riddarholm Church was rung from 12:00 to 13:00 on the day of her funeral.

== Honours ==
=== National honours ===
- Sweden 22 March 1952: Knight Grand Cross of the Royal Order of the Seraphim
- Sweden Member of the Royal Family Decoration of King Gustaf VI Adolf
- Sweden Member of the Royal Family Decoration of King Carl XVI Gustaf

=== Foreign honours ===
- Japan: Dame Grand Cordon of the Order of the Precious Crown
- Norway: Knight Grand Cross of the Order of Saint Olav

== Ancestry ==
Ancestors of Princess Désirée, Baroness Silfverschiöld

8. Gustaf V of Sweden
4. Gustaf VI Adolf of Sweden
9. Princess Victoria of Baden
2. Prince Gustaf Adolf, Duke of Västerbotten
10. Prince Arthur, Duke of Connaught and Strathearn
5. Princess Margaret of Connaught
11. Princess Louise Margaret of Prussia
1. Princess Désirée of Sweden
12. Prince Leopold, Duke of Albany
6. Charles Edward, Duke of Saxe-Coburg and Gotha
13. Princess Helena of Waldeck and Pyrmont
3. Princess Sibylla of Saxe-Coburg and Gotha
14. Friedrich Ferdinand, Duke of Schleswig-Holstein
7. Princess Victoria Adelaide of Schleswig-Holstein-Sonderburg-Glücksburg
15. Princess Karoline Mathilde of Schleswig-Holstein-Sonderburg-Augustenburg
