= Monarchy of Sweden =

King of Sweden
- Sveriges Konung
- Greater coat of arms of Sweden

Incumbent
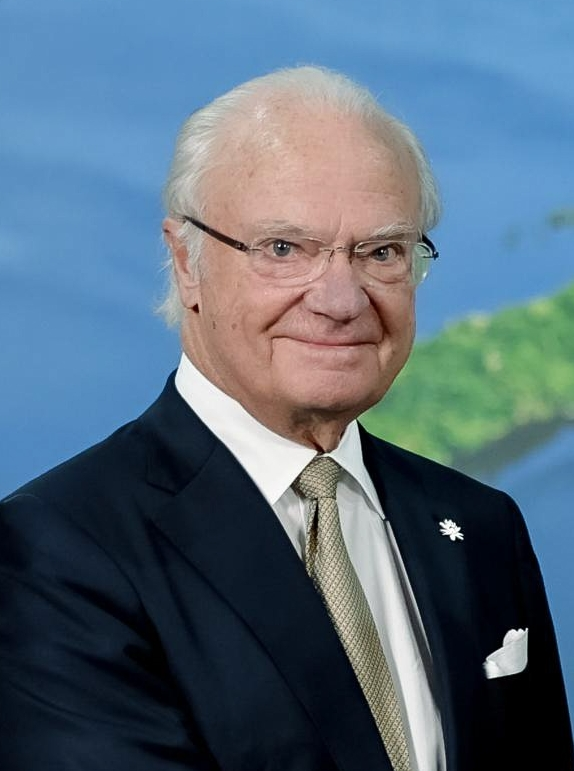
- Carl XVI Gustaf since 15 September 1973

Details
- Style: His Majesty
- Heir apparent: Crown Princess Victoria
- First monarch: Eric the Victorious
- Formed: 970; 1056 years ago
- Residences: See list
- Website: www.kungahuset.se

The monarchy of Sweden is centred on the monarchical head of state of Sweden, by law a constitutional and hereditary monarchy with a parliamentary system. There have been kings in what now is the Kingdom of Sweden for more than a millennium. Originally an elective monarchy, it became a hereditary monarchy in the 16th century during the reign of Gustav Vasa, though virtually all monarchs before that belonged to a limited and small number of political families which are considered to be the royal dynasties of Sweden.

The official continuous count usually begins with the kings who ruled both Svealand and Götaland as one kingdom. Sweden's monarchy is amongst the oldest in the world, with a regnal list stretching back to the tenth century, starting with Eric the Victorious; the Swedish monarchy has, for the past thousand years, undergone cycles of decline and strengthening, culminating in the modern constitutional monarchy.

The Swedish monarchy has been one of the key features in the development of Swedish culture, having for centuries patronized the arts and sciences. Several of Sweden's most prestigious academies and cultural institutions are under Swedish royal protection. This historical role politically, militarily and culturally, in spite of the country's otherwise liberal leanings, has resulted in the Swedish monarchy being popular. In recent years, however, some of the most serious criticism ever published has taken place about the way his monarchy has developed under the current king's fifty-year reign.

Sweden in the present day is a representative democracy in a parliamentary system based on popular sovereignty, as defined in the current Instrument of Government (one of the four Basic Laws of the Realm which makes up the written constitution). The monarch and the members of the royal family undertake a variety of official, unofficial and other representational duties within Sweden and abroad. The current king of Sweden is Carl XVI Gustaf, while his heir is Crown Princess Victoria.

The Swedish monarch has numerous residences, primarily state-owned but some privately owned; their official residence and workplace is Stockholm Palace, while Drottningholm Palace serves as the monarchy's private residence. Other notable residences include Gripsholm Castle and Ulriksdal Palace, as well as others throughout Sweden. Several large palaces and a considerable section of the Swedish capital of Stockholm have been at the disposal of the monarch since 1809.

== History ==
=== Pre-16th century ===
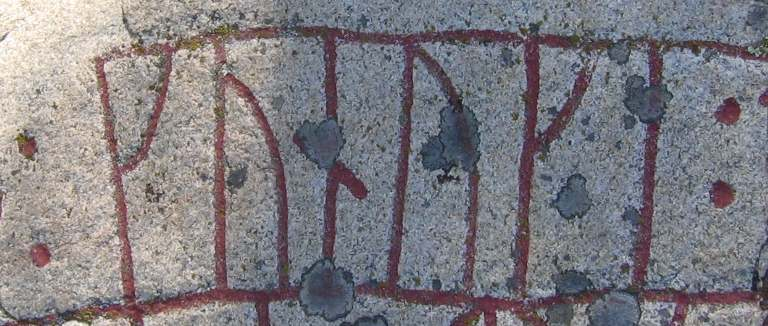
kunuki, i.e. konungi, the dative case for Old Norse konungr ("king"). A runic inscription of the 11th century (U11) refers to King Håkan the Red.

Scandinavian peoples have had kings since prehistoric times. As early as the 1st century CE, Tacitus wrote that the Suiones had a king, but the order of Swedish regnal succession up until King Eric the Victorious (died 995), is known almost exclusively through accounts in historically controversial Norse sagas (see Mythical kings of Sweden and Semi-legendary kings of Sweden).

Originally, the Swedish king had combined powers limited to that of a war chief, a judge and a priest at the Temple at Uppsala (see Germanic king). However, there are thousands of runestones commemorating commoners, but no known chronicle about the Swedish kings prior to the 14th century (though a list of kings was added in the Västgöta Law), and there is a relatively small number of runestones that are thought to mention kings: Gs 11 (Emund the Old – reigned 1050–1060), U 11 (Håkan the Red – late 11th century) and U 861 (Blot-Sweyn – reigned c. 1080).

About 1000 A.D., the first king known to rule both Svealand and Götaland was Olof Skötkonung, but further history for the next two centuries is obscure, with many kings whose tenures and actual influence/power remains unclear. The Royal Court of Sweden, however, does count Olof's father, Eric the Victorious, as Sweden's first king. The power of the king was greatly strengthened by the introduction of Christianity during the 11th century, and the following centuries saw a process of consolidation of power into the hands of the king. The Swedes traditionally elected a king from a favored dynasty at the Stones of Mora, and the people had the right to elect the king as well as to depose him. The ceremonial stones were destroyed around 1515.

In the 12th century, the consolidation of Sweden was still affected by dynastic struggles between the Erik and Sverker clans, which ended when a third clan married into the Erik clan and the House of Bjälbo was established on the throne. That dynasty formed pre-Kalmar Union Sweden into a strong state, and finally King Magnus Eriksson (reigned 1319–1364) even ruled Norway (1319–1343) and Scania (1332–1360). Following the Black Death, the union weakened, and Scania was captured by Denmark.

In 1397, after the Black Death and domestic power struggles, Queen Margaret I of Denmark united Sweden (then including Finland), Denmark and Norway (then including Iceland) in the Union of Kalmar with the approval of the Swedish nobility. Continual tension within each country and the union led to open conflict between the Swedes and the Danes in the 15th century. The union's final disintegration in the early 16th century led to prolonged rivalry between Denmark-Norway and Sweden (with Finland) for centuries to come.

=== 16th- and 17th-century changes ===
House of Vasa

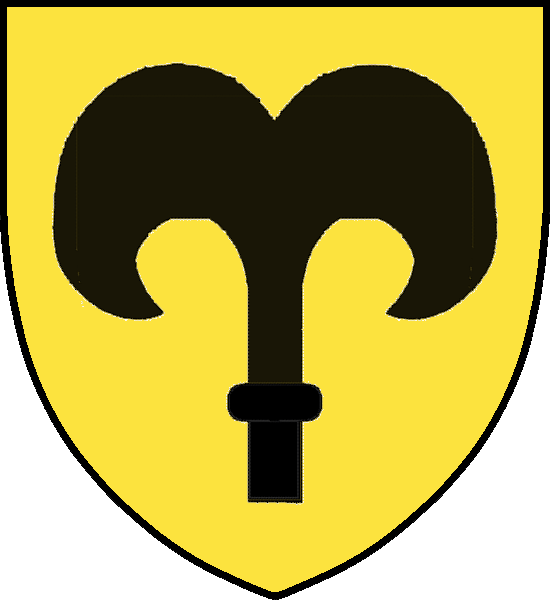
Nils Kettilsson(Vasa)(sv) († 1378)
Krister Nilsson (Vasa)(sv) († 1442)	Ramborg Nilsdotter (m. Tord Bonde (Röriksson)(sv))Bonde family
Karl Kristiernsson(Vasa) († 1440)	Johan Kristiernsson(Vasa) († 1477)	Nils Kristiernsson (Vasa) († 1464)	Kristina Kristiernsdotter (ép. Bengt Jönsson(Oxenstierna))	Knut Tordsson († 1413)
Kettil Karlsson (v. 1433–1465) bishop of Linköping from 1459 to 1465 and Swedish regent in 1465.	Erik Johansson Vasa (v. 1470–1520)	Charles VIII Bonde (1409–1470) r. 1448–1457, 1464–1465
Gustav I Eriksson Vasa (1496–1560); Regent 1521–1523 r. 1523–1560
Eric XIV (1533–1577) r. 1560–1568	John III (1537–1592) r. 1569–1592	Charles IX (1550–1611); Regent 1599–1604 r. 1604–1611	Magnus (1542–1595); Duke of Östergötland
Julius Gyllenhielm Gyllenhielm (1560–1581)	Sigismund III Vasa (1566–1632) r. 1592–1599	Catherine (1584–1638)	Gustav II Adolph (1594–1632) r. 1611–1632	Carl Gyllenhielm Gyllenhielm (1574–1650); Swedish Field Marshal
Władysław IV Vasa (1595–1648); King of Poland, GD of Lithuania r. 1632–1648	John II Casimir Vasa (1609–1672); King of Poland, GD of Lithuania r. 1648 – 1668 (abdicated)	Charles X Gustav (1622–1660) r. 1654–1660	Christina (1626–1689) r. 1632–1654	Gustaf Gusstafsson (Gustaf Gustafsson af Vasaborg) (1616–1653) af Vasaborg,1637 (Vasaborg (ätt)), Count of Nystad, 1647

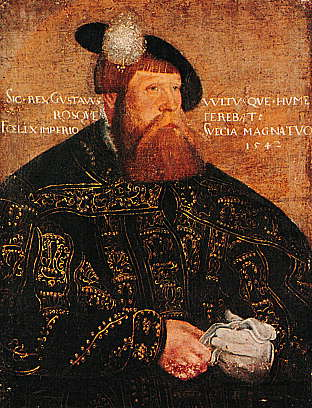
Gustav I, portrayed here in 1542 by Jakob Binck, legally created the hereditary monarchy and organized the Swedish unitary state.

Catholic bishops had supported the King of Denmark, Christian II, but he was overthrown in a rebellion led by nobleman Gustav Vasa, whose father had been executed at the Stockholm bloodbath. Gustav Vasa (hereinafter referred to as Gustav I) was elected King of Sweden by the estates of the realm, assembled in Strängnäs on 6 June 1523.

Inspired by the teachings of Martin Luther, Gustav I used the Protestant Reformation to curb the power of the Roman Catholic Church. In 1527 he persuaded the estates of the realm, assembled in the city of Västerås, to confiscate church lands, which comprised 21% of the country's farmland. At the same time, he broke with the papacy and established a reformed state church: the Church of Sweden. (Note: A complete Lutheran church ordinance was not presented until the Swedish Church Ordinance 1571, with a statement of faith finalized by the Uppsala Synod in 1593.) Throughout his reign, Gustav I suppressed both aristocratic and peasant opposition to his ecclesiastical policies and efforts at centralisation, which to some extent laid the foundation for the modern Swedish unitary state. Legally Sweden has only been a hereditary monarchy since 1544 when the Riksdag of the Estates, through Västerås arvförening, designated the sons of King Gustav I as the heirs to the Throne. (Note: The powers of the king were originally regulated by a section of the written legal code called Konungabalk (Kings' partition) from medieval times until 1734, when a new law code of Sweden was adopted and that section was removed. The new law code of Sweden was adopted after a long period of inquiries by royal commissions since the days of Charles IX (late 16th/early 17th century))

Tax reforms took place in 1538 and 1558, whereby multiple complex taxes on independent farmers were simplified and standardised throughout the district and tax assessments per farm were adjusted to reflect ability to pay. Crown tax revenues increased, but more importantly the new system was perceived as fairer. A war with Lübeck in 1535 resulted in the expulsion of the Hanseatic traders, who previously had had a monopoly on foreign trade. With its own burghers in charge, Sweden's economic strength grew rapidly, and by 1544 Gustav controlled 60% of the farmlands in all of Sweden. Sweden now built the first modern army in Europe, supported by a sophisticated tax system and an efficient bureaucracy.

At the death of King Gustav I in 1560, he was succeeded by his oldest son Eric XIV. His reign was marked by Sweden's entrance into the Livonian War and the Northern Seven Years' War. The combination of Eric's developing mental disorder and his opposition to the aristocracy led to the Sture Murders in 1567 and the imprisonment of his brother John (III), who was married to Catherine Jagiellon, sister of King Sigismund II of Poland. In 1568 Eric was dethroned and succeeded by John III. In domestic politics John III showed clear Catholic sympathies, inspired by his queen, creating friction with the Swedish clergy and nobility. He reintroduced several Catholic traditions previously abolished, and his foreign policy was affected by his family connection to the Polish–Lithuanian Commonwealth, where his eldest son had been made King Sigismund III in 1587. (Note: No regnal number – just Sigismund – is used when referring to Sigismund III Vasa as King of Sweden.) Following the death of his father, Sigismund tried to rule Sweden from Poland, leaving Sweden under the control of a regent – his paternal uncle (Gustav I's youngest son) Charles (IX) – but was unable to defend his Swedish throne against the ambitions of his uncle. In 1598 Sigismund and his Swedish-Polish army were defeated at the Battle of Stångebro by the forces of Charles, and he was declared deposed by the Estates in 1599.

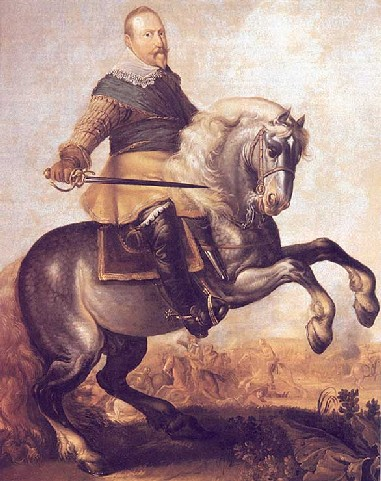
The Lion of the North: King Gustavus Adolphus depicted at the turning point of the Battle of Breitenfeld (1631) against the forces of Johann Tserclaes, Count of Tilly

In 1604, the Estates finally recognized the regent and de facto ruler as King Charles IX. His short reign was one of uninterrupted warfare. The hostility of Poland and the breakup of Russia involved him in overseas contests for the possession of Livonia and Ingria, the Polish–Swedish War (1600–1611) and the Ingrian War, while his pretensions to claim Lapland brought on a war with Denmark (Kalmar War) in the last year of his reign. (Note: The war against Denmark was concluded in 1613 with a peace treaty, which did not cost Sweden any territory, but Sweden was nevertheless forced to pay a heavy indemnity to Denmark (Treaty of Knäred) in order to regain control of Älvsborg Fortress.)

Gustavus Adolphus inherited three wars from his father when he ascended to the throne. From 1612, when Count Axel Oxenstierna was appointed Lord High Chancellor, which he remained until Gustavus Adolphus's death, the two men struck a long and successful partnership and complemented each other well: In Oxenstierna's own words, his "cool" balanced the King's "heat". The war against Russia (the Ingrian War) ended in 1617 with the Treaty of Stolbovo, which excluded Russia from the Baltic Sea. The final inherited war, the war against Poland, ended in 1629 with the Truce of Altmark, which transferred the large province of Livonia to Sweden and freed the Swedish forces for subsequent intervention in the Thirty Years' War in Germany, where Swedish forces had already established a bridgehead in 1628. Brandenburg was torn apart by a quarrel between the Protestants and the Catholics. When Gustavus Adolphus began his push into northern Germany in June–July 1630, he had just 4,000 soldiers. But he was soon able to consolidate the Protestant position in the north, using reinforcements from Sweden and money supplied by France at the Treaty of Bärwalde. (Note: Meanwhile, a Catholic army under Tilly was laying waste to Saxony. Gustavus Adolphus met Tilly's army and crushed it at the First Battle of Breitenfeld in September 1631. He then marched clear across Germany, establishing his winter quarters near the Rhine, making plans for the invasion of the rest of the Holy Roman Empire. In March 1632, Gustavus Adolphus invaded Bavaria, a staunch ally of the Emperor. He forced the withdrawal of his Catholic opponents at the Battle of Rain. In the summer of that year, he sought a political solution that would preserve the existing structure of states in Germany, while guaranteeing the security of its Protestants. But achieving these objectives depended on his continued success on the battlefield.) Gustavus Adolphus was killed at the 1632 Battle of Lützen. Queen Maria Eleonora and the king's ministers took over the government of the Realm on behalf of Gustavus Adolphus' underage daughter Christina, until she reached the age of majority. Gustavus Adolphus is often regarded by military historians as one of the greatest military commanders of all time, with innovative use of combined arms. (Note: In Chapter V of Carl von Clausewitz' On War, he lists Gustavus Adolphus as an example of an outstanding military leader, along with: Alexander the Great, Julius Caesar, Alexander Farnese, Charles XII, Frederick the Great and Napoleon Bonaparte.)

Christina succeeded her father aged six. A regency government ruled in her name until she turned 18 years of age. During the regency, Chancellor Axel Oxenstierna wrote the 1634 Instrument of Government, which although never approved by any monarch, continued to have an important normative role in the state administration. Christina early on showed an interest in literature and the sciences and famously brought René Descartes to Sweden. Sweden continued to be involved in the Thirty Years' War during reign of Christina and that conflict was settled at the 1648 Peace of Westphalia, and the Swedish monarch received representation at the Imperial Diet due to the German conquests (Bremen-Verden and Swedish Pomerania) that were made. (Note: Although the local conflict with Denmark-Norway, as part of the Thirty Years' War was settled at the Second Treaty of Brömsebro (1645), in which the Danes ceded the Norwegian provinces of Jämtland, Härjedalen and Idre & Särna as well as the Danish Baltic Sea islands of Gotland and Ösel. Sweden was furthermore exempted from the Sound Dues and received the Danish province of Halland for a period of 30 years as a guarantee of these provisions.) Having decided not to marry, Christina abdicated the throne on 5 June 1654 in favor of her cousin Charles X Gustav, went abroad, and converted to Roman Catholicism.

House of Wittelsbach (Palatine-Zweibrucken branch) on the Swedish Throne

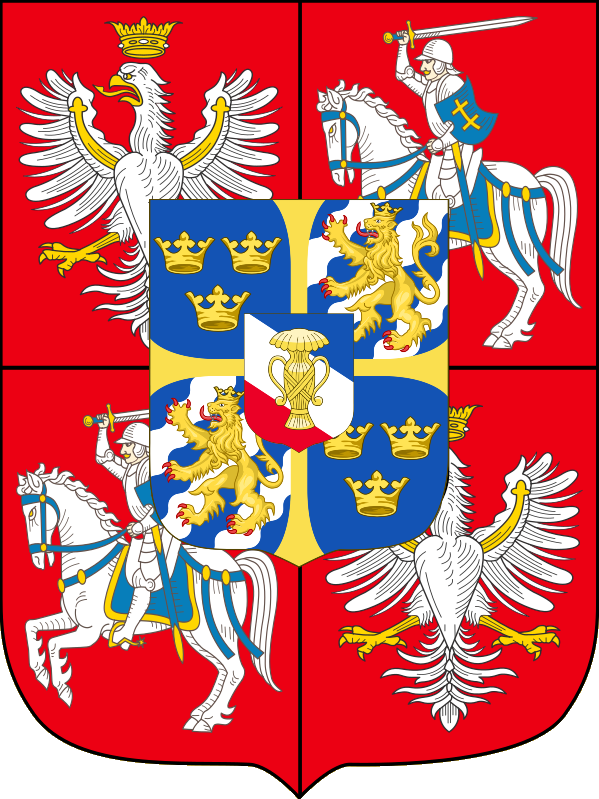
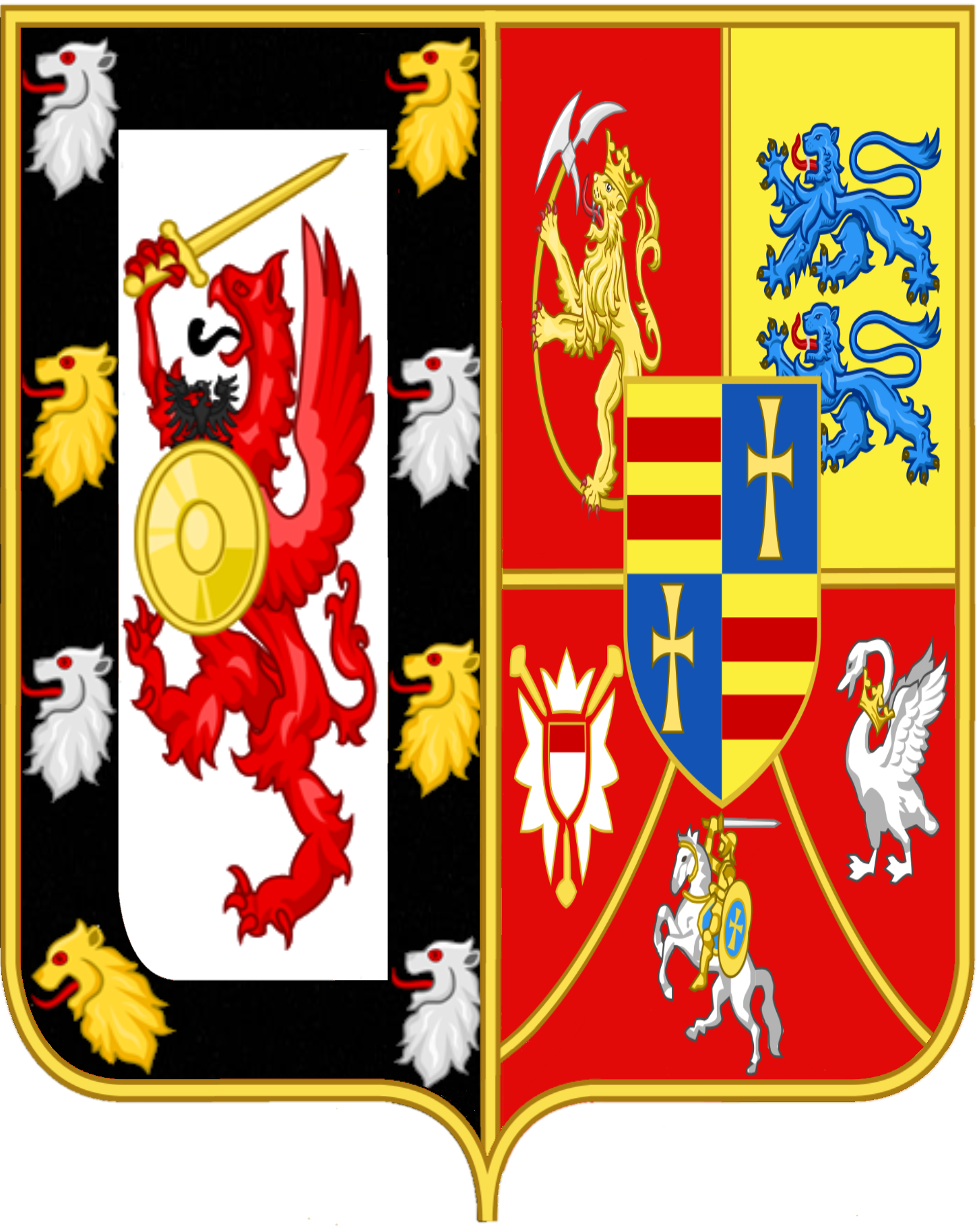
Sigismund III Vasa (1566–1632) r. 1592–1599	Gustav II Adolph (1594–1632) r. 1611–1632	Princess Catherine (1584–1638)	John Casimir, Count Palatine of Kleeburg; 1589–1652	Frederick III, Duke of Holstein-Gottorp (1597–1659)
Władysław IV Vasa (1595–1648); King of Poland, GD of Lithuania r. 1632–1648	John II Casimir Vasa (1609–1672); King of Poland, GD of Lithuania r. 1648 – 1668 (abdicated)	Christina (1626–1689) r. 1632–1654	Charles X Gustav (1622–1660) r. 1654–1660	House of Sweden—Palatine-Zweibrücken	Christina Magdalena of the Palatinate-Zweibrücken (1616–1662)	Frederick VI, Margrave of Baden-Durlach (1617–1677)
Charles XI (1655–1697) r. 1660–1697	John Frederick, Margrave of Brandenburg-Ansbach; 1654–1686	Johanna Elisabeth of Baden-Durlach (1651–1680)	Frederick VII, Margrave of Baden-Durlach (1647–1709)	Christian Albert, Duke of Holstein-Gottorp (1641–1695)
Hedvig Sophia of Sweden heiress of Sweden eldest sister of Charles XII of Sweden; 1681–1708	Frederick I (1676–1751) r. 1720–1751	Ulrika Eleonora (1688–1741) r. 1718–1720	Charles XII (1682–1718) r. 1697–1718	Dorothea Friederike of Brandenburg-Ansbach (1676–1731)	Johann Reinhard III, Count of Hanau-Lichtenberg (1665–1736)	Margravine Albertina Frederica of Baden-Durlach (1682–1755)	Christian August of Holstein-Gottorp, Prince of Eutin (1673–1726)
Charles Frederick; Duke of Schleswig- Holstein-Gottorp r. 1702–1739; 1700–1739	Grand Duchess Anna Petrovna of Russia daughter & eventual heiress of Peter the Great r. 1725–1728; 1708–1728	Louis VIII, Landgrave of Hesse-Darmstadt (1691–1768)	Countess Charlotte of Hanau-Lichtenberg (1700–1726)	Adolf Frederick (1710–1771) r. 1751–1771
House of Holstein- Gottorp-Romanov	House of Holstein-Gottorp (Swedish line)
Peter III; Emperor of Russia r. 1762–1762; 1728–1762	Prince George William of Hesse-Darmstadt (1722–1782)

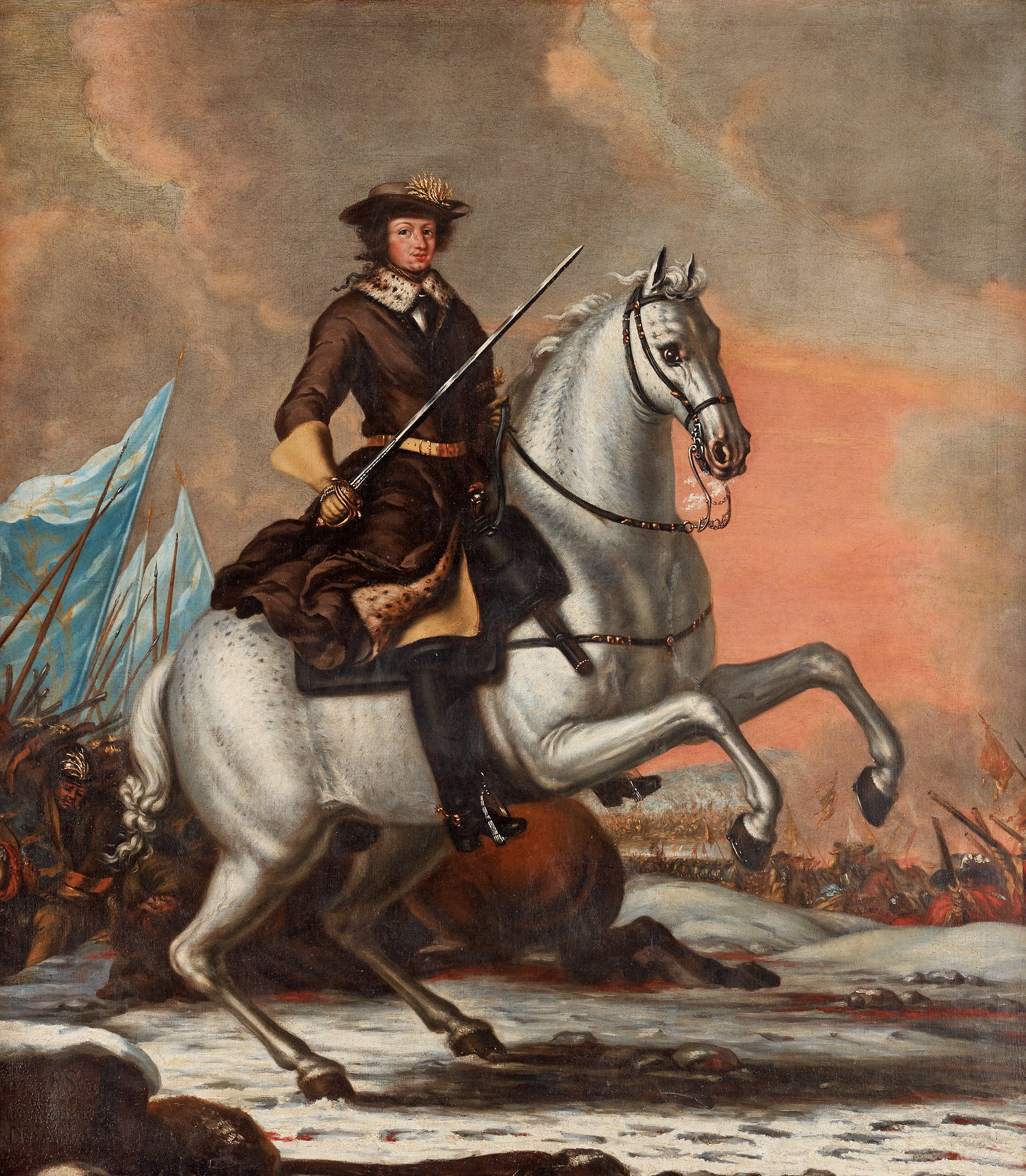
Charles XI at the Battle of Lund in 1676. Painting by David Klöcker Ehrenstrahl.

The Estates elected Charles X Gustav as their new King, and his short reign is best characterized by foreign wars: first a lengthy campaign within Poland and then with Denmark. In the latter case, the risky 1658 March across the Belts which resulted in the Treaty of Roskilde, would prove to be the largest permanent territorial gain Sweden ever had: Skåne, Blekinge and Bohuslän now became Swedish provinces and have remained so ever since. Charles X Gustav was not satisfied, as he wanted to crush Denmark once and for all, but the 1659 Assault on Copenhagen did not prove successful for the Swedes, largely due to the Dutch naval intervention to the aid of the Danes.

Charles X Gustav died in Gothenburg in 1660 and as the Crown passed to his five-year-old son Charles XI, a new regency government would assume the responsibilities of the state. The regency government, composed of aristocrats and led by Chancellor Count Magnus Gabriel De la Gardie, was more interested in feathering their own nests rather than working in the interest of the country at large. When Charles XI came of age in 1672, the effectiveness of the armed forces had seriously deteriorated and the country was ill-prepared as the King of Denmark, Christian V, invaded to settle old scores. The Danes were ultimately unsuccessful in their attempts, and Charles XI undertook several measures to prevent what had just almost happened from occurring again: reducing the influence of the aristocracy by nationalizing estates and properties which had been handed out to them by his predecessors, introducing the Allotment system (Swedish: indelningsverket) which would form the basis of the armed forces until the 20th century, and with the support of the Estates he was declared in 1680 an absolute monarch.

Charles XI was succeeded by his son, Charles XII, who would prove to be an extremely able military commander, defeating far larger enemies with the small but highly professional Swedish army. His defeat of the Russians at Narva when just 18 years old was to be his greatest victory. However his campaigning at the head of his army during the Great Northern War would ultimately lead to catastrophic defeat at the Battle of Poltava after which he spent several years in Turkey (now Moldova). Some years later he was killed at the Siege of Fredriksten during an attempt to invade Norway. The Swedish Age of Greatness (Swedish: stormaktstiden) had ended. (Note: Sweden ceded its Baltic provinces and parts of Finland to Russia in the 1721 Treaty of Nystad.)

=== 18th century to the present ===
House of Oldenburg (Schleswig-Holstein-Gottorp branch) & Succession to the Swedish Throne

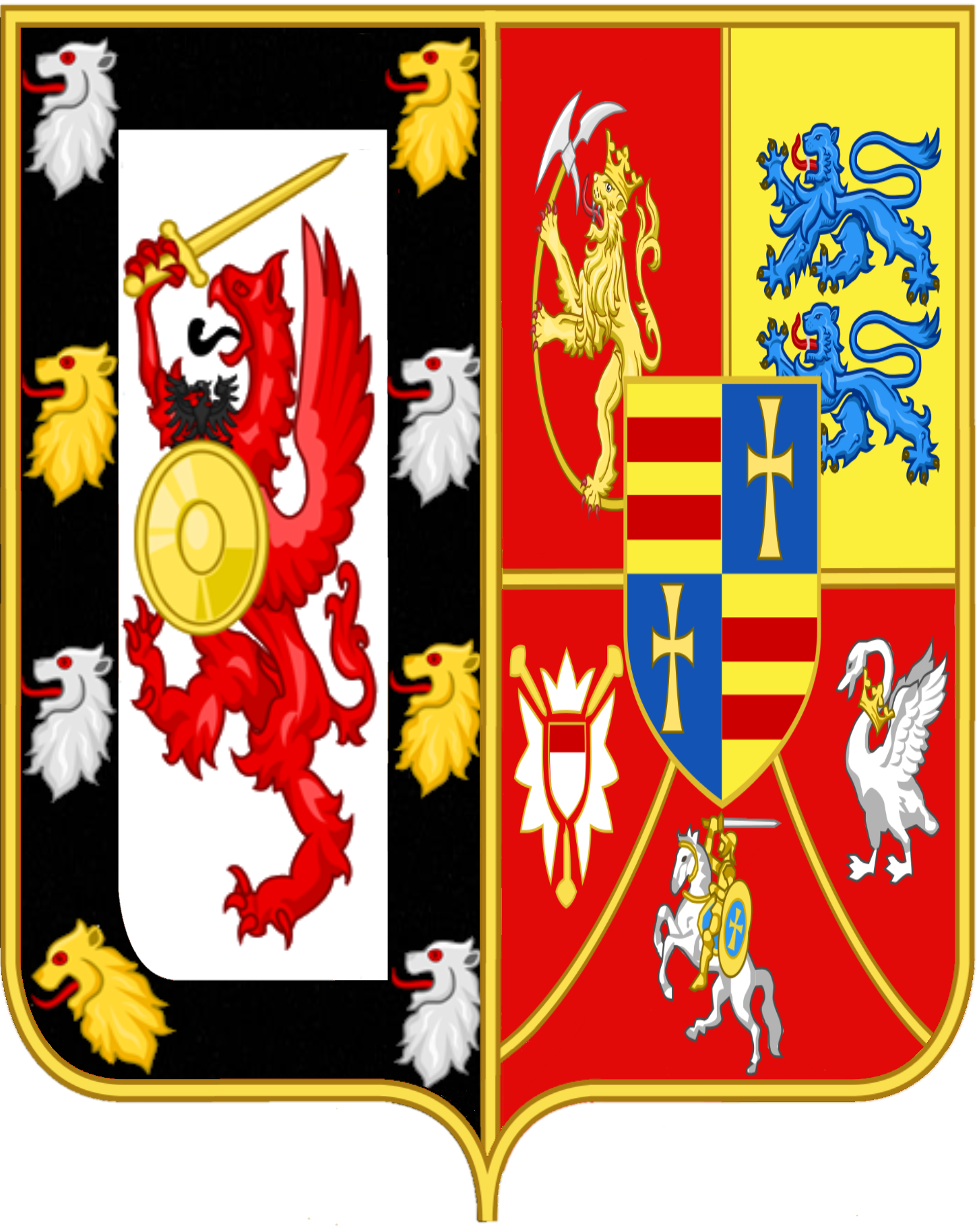
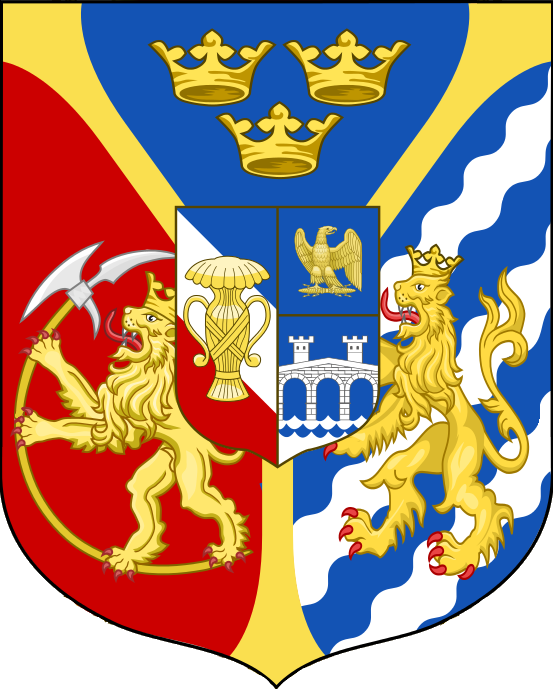
House of Sweden—Palatine-Zweibrücken	House of Schleswig- Holstein-Gottorp
Charles XI of Sweden; King of Sweden r. 1660–1697; 1655–1697	Christian Albert; Duke of Schleswig- Holstein-Gottorp r. 1659–1695; 1641–1695
Peter the Great; Emperor of Russia r. 1682–1725; 1672 – 1725	Hedvig Sophia of Sweden heiress of Sweden eldest sister of Charles XII of Sweden; 1681–1708	Frederick IV; Duke of Schleswig- Holstein-Gottorp r. 1695–1702; 1671–1702	Christian August; 1673–1726	Albertina of Baden-Durach her grandmother was a sister of Charles X of Sweden
House of Romanov
Anna; Duchess consort of Holstein-Gottorp r. 1725–1728; 1708–1728	Charles Frederick; Duke of Schleswig- Holstein-Gottorp r. 1702–1739; 1700–1739	Joanna Elisabeth; 1712–1760 married Christian August- Prince of Anhalt-Zerbst	Adolf Frederick; King of Sweden r. 1751–1771; 1710–1771	Frederick August I Duke of Oldenburg r. 1774–1785; 1711–1785	George Louis; 1719–1763
House of Holstein- Gottorp-Romanov	House of Holstein-Gottorp (Swedish line)
Peter III; Emperor of Russia r. 1762-1762; 1728–1762	Catherine II the Great; Emperess of Russia r. 1762–1796; 1729–1796	Gustav III; King of Sweden r. 1771–1792; 1746–1792	Charles XIII; King of Sweden r. 1809–1818; King of Norway r. 1814–1818; 1748–1818	William; Duke of Oldenburg r. 1785–1823; 1754–1823	Peter I Grand Duke of Oldenburg r. 1823–1829; 1755–1829
Paul I Emperor of Russia r. 1796–1801; 1754–1801	Gustav IV Adolf; King of Sweden r. 1792–1809; 1778–1837	Charles XIV John; Bernadotte; King of Sweden r. 1818–1844; 1763–1844	Augustus; Grand Duke of Oldenburg r. 1829–1853; 1783–1853
House of Holstein- Gottorp-Romanov	House Sweden-Bernadotte

Charles XII's sister, Ulrika Eleonora, now claimed the throne over her nephew and son of her elder sister, Charles Frederick, Duke of Holstein-Gottorp (see genealogy chart above). Charles Frederick had the claim of seniority within the family, but Ulrica Eleonora claimed that her elder sister had not "acquired the consent of the Parliamentary Estates" for her marriage to his father, according to laws of succession laid down in Norrköpings arvförening. The duke's party asserted that the absolute monarchy in Sweden, which his grandfather King Charles XI had created, made that marriage clause irrelevant. When Charles Frederick was confronted with Ulrika Eleonora, he was forced by Arvid Horn to greet her as queen. He asked to be granted the title Royal Highness and to be recognised as her heir, but when her husband, Frederick of Hesse, instead was given the title, he left Sweden in 1719. In 1723, he was granted the title Royal Highness in his absence, but his pro-Russian policy at that time made him impossible as heir to the Swedish throne. His marriage in 1725 to Anna, the daughter of Peter of Great, did not help his case. His mother, and later Hedwig Eleonora, both supported and worked for his right to be considered heir of Sweden after his childless uncle.

Ulrika Eleonora was forced by the Estates to sign the 1719 Instrument of Government, which ended the absolute monarchy and made the Riksdag of the Estates the highest organ of the state and reduced the role of monarch to a figurehead. The Age of Liberty (Swedish: frihetstiden) with its parliamentary rule, dominated by two parties – the Caps and the Hats – had begun. Ulrika Eleonora had had enough after a year on the throne and abdicated in favor of her husband, Frederick, who had little interest in the affairs of state and was elected King by the Estates as King Frederick I, resulting in the 1720 Instrument of Government: content-wise almost identical to the one from 1719. Despite having many extra-marital affairs, Frederick I never sired a legitimate heir to the throne.

After the death/impending death of King Frederick without heirs, Charles Frederick's heir, Charles Peter Ulrich, had become untenable in Sweden, as he had been taken to Russia by his aunt Elizabeth I of Russia, nominated as heir/Grand Duke, and became Emperor Peter III of Russia. In 1743, Adolf Frederick, a cousin of Charles Frederick, of the same house of Holstein-Gottrop, and a descendant of a sister of Charles X Gustav of Sweden was elected heir to the throne of Sweden by the Hat faction (Swedish: Hattarna). The Hat faction wanted to obtain better conditions at the Treaty of Åbo from Empress Elizabeth of Russia, who had adopted his nephew as her heir. His mother, Albertina Frederica of Baden-Durlach (1682–1755), was a descendant of earlier royal dynasties of Sweden, great-granddaughter of Princess Catherine of Sweden, mother of King Charles X of Sweden. On his mother's side, Adolf Frederick was descended from King Gustav Vasa and Christina Magdalena, a sister of Charles X of Sweden. He succeeded as King Adolf Frederick 8 years later on 25 March 1751.

During his 20-year reign, Adolf Frederick was little more than a figurehead, the real power being with the Riksdag of the Estates, often distracted by party strife. Twice he endeavored to free himself from the tutelage of the estates. The first occasion was in 1756. Stimulated by his consort Louisa Ulrika of Prussia (sister of Frederick the Great), he tried to regain a portion of the attenuated prerogative through the Coup of 1756 to abolish the rule of the Riksdag of the Estates and reinstate absolute monarchy in Sweden. He nearly lost his throne in consequence. On the second occasion during the December Crisis of 1768, under the guidance of his eldest son, Gustav, he succeeded in overthrowing the "Cap" (Swedish: Mössorna) senate, but was unable to make any use of his victory.

Adolf Frederick's son, King Gustav III, was more successful in restoring royal authority. In 1772, the 1720 Instrument in Government was later replaced by the 1772 Instrument of Government in a self-coup orchestrated by the King.

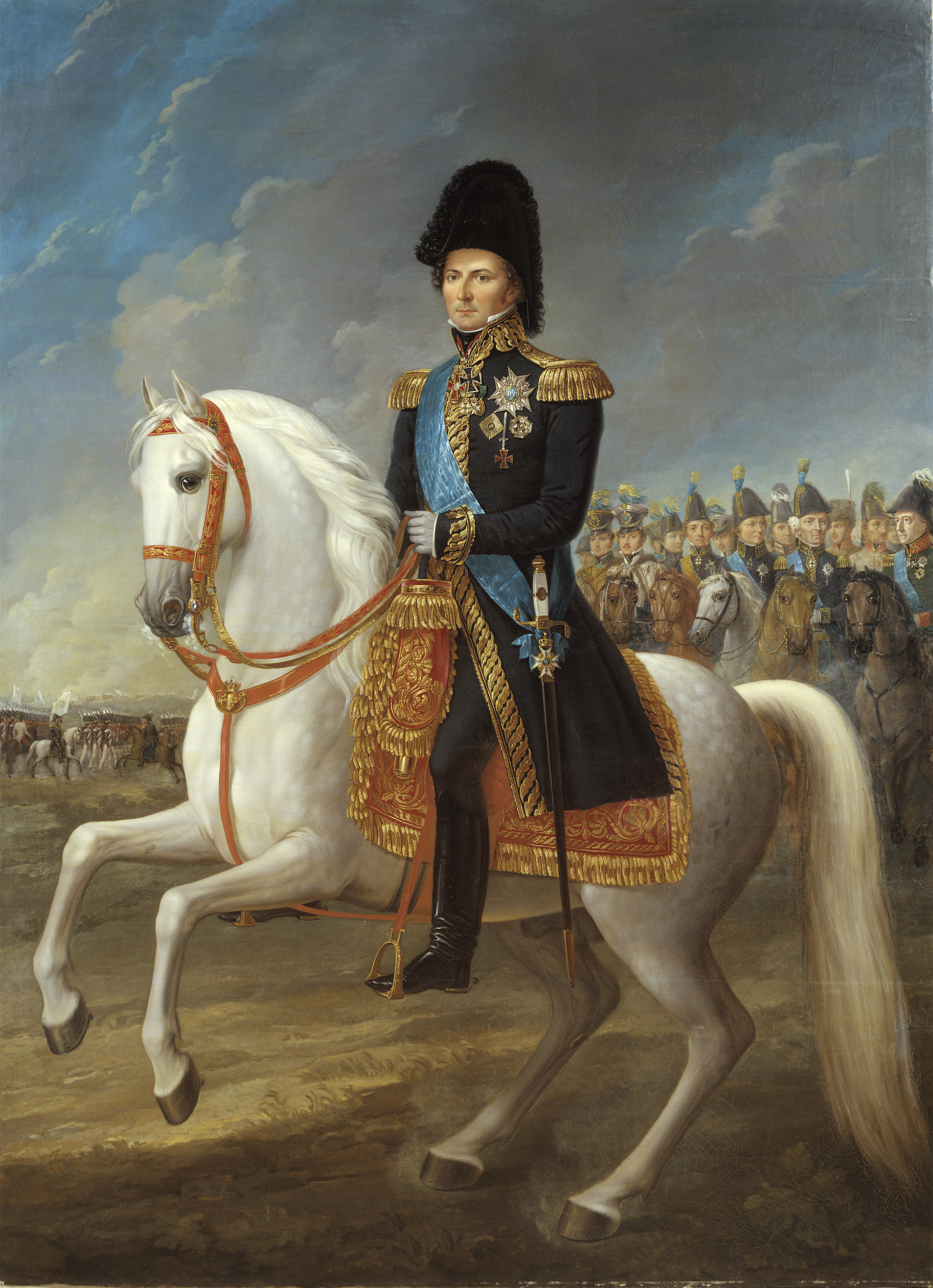
Crown Prince Charles John at the Battle of Leipzig (1813). Painting by Fredric Westin.

On 17 September 1809 in the Treaty of Fredrikshamn, as a result of the poorly managed Finnish War, Sweden had to surrender Finland to Russia. King Gustav IV Adolf and his descendants were deposed in a coup d'état led by dissatisfied army officers. The childless uncle of the former king was almost immediately elected as King Charles XIII. The Instrument of Government of 1809 put an end to royal absolutism by dividing the legislative power between the Riksdag (primary) and the king (secondary), and vested executive power in the king when acting through the Council of State.

The present Bernadotte dynasty was established in September 1810 when the Riksdag, convened in Örebro, elected French Marshal and Prince of Pontecorvo Jean-Baptiste Jules Bernadotte as crown prince. This took place because Charles XIII had no legitimate heir, and a crown prince previously elected in January 1810, Charles August, suddenly had died of a stroke during a military exercise.

Although the 19th century Bernadotte monarchs that would follow Charles XIV John's reign tried to defend the power and privileges they still had, the tide incrementally turned against "personal regal rule" (Swedish: personlig kungamakt) with the growth of the liberals, social democrats, and the expansion of the franchise.

The daughter of Gustav IV Adolph, Princess Sofia Wilhelmina (21 May 1801 – 1865) married Grand Duke Leopold of Baden, and their granddaughter Victoria of Baden married the Bernadotte king Gustaf V of Sweden. The present King Carl XVI Gustaf of Sweden is thus Gustav IV's heir through his grandfather, Gustav VI Adolf.

House of Bernadotte and Link to Earlier Swedish Dynasties

Charles XIV John (1763–1844); Elected Crown Prince by the Riksdag 1810 r. 1818–1844	Eugène de Beauharnais (1781–1824)	Princess Augusta of Bavaria (1788–1851)	Gustav IV Adolf (1778–1837) r. 1792 – 1809
Oscar I (1799–1859) r. 1844–1859	Josephine of Leuchtenberg (1807–1876)	Leopold, Grand Duke of Baden (1790–1852)	Princess Sophie (1801–1865)	Crown Prince Gustav (1799–1877)
Charles XV (1826–1872) r. 1859–1872	Prince Gustaf; Duke of Uppland (1827–1852)	Oscar II (1829–1907) r. 1872–1907	Frederick I, Grand Duke of Baden (186–1907)
Frederick VIII of Denmark (1843–1912)	Princess Louise; Queen consort of Denmark (1851–1926)	Prince Carl Oscar; Duke of Södermanland (1852–1854)	Gustaf V (1858–1950) r. 1907–1950	Victoria of Baden (1862–1930)
Gustaf VI Adolf (1882–1973) r. 1950–1973
Prince Gustaf Adolf; Duke of Västerbotten (1906–1947)
Carl XVI Gustaf (b. 1946) r. 1973–present
Crown Princess Victoria; Duchess of Västergötland; 1977– (Crown Princess from 1980)	Prince Carl Philip; Duke of Värmland (b. 1979) (Crown Prince 1979–1980)
Princess Estelle; Duchess of Östergötland (b. 2012)

When King Gustav V publicly objected to the defence budget cuts made by Prime Minister Karl Staaff and the cabinet just before the First World War in the event known as the Courtyard Crisis accompanied by the Peasant armament support march (Swedish: bondetåget), it was seen as a deliberate provocation by conservatives and reactionaries against the uncodified norm of a parliamentary system supported by the liberals and the social democrats, leading to Staaff's resignation. Gustaf V then appointed a caretaker government, supported by the conservatives, led by legal scholar Hjalmar Hammarskjöld, which remained in power longer than expected due to the outbreak of World War I (in which Sweden remained neutral). By then, increased defence spending was no longer a controversial issue. Nevertheless, in the year of the outbreak of the Russian Revolution, social tensions continued to rise; the general election in 1917 gave the liberals and social democrats greatly strengthened representation in both Riksdag chambers and a conservative government was no longer a defensible option. Following the definite breakthrough of parliamentarism in 1917, with the appointment of the coalition government of liberals and social democrats led by professor Nils Edén, the political influence of the King was considerably reduced and an unwritten constitutional precedent was set that would remain in effect until 1975.

Only during World War II, in the so-called Midsummer crisis (regarding the issue whether neutral Sweden should permit rail transport of German troops from Norway passing through to Finland), did Gustaf V allegedly try to intervene in the political process by threatening to abdicate.

King Gustaf VI Adolf succeeded his elderly father who died in 1950, and he is generally regarded as a constitutional monarch who stayed out of politics and controversy. In 1954, a royal commission began work on whether Sweden should undergo constitutional reform to adapt the 1809 Instrument of Government to current political realities, or whether a new one should be written; ultimately the latter idea was chosen. The future role of the monarchy was settled in a manner well known within Swedish political discourse: a political compromise reached at the summer resort of Torekov in 1971 (hence known as the Torekov compromise, Swedish: Torekovskompromissen) by representatives of four of the parties in the Riksdag (the Social Democrats, the Centre Party, the Liberal People's Party, and the Moderate Party, that is all the parties except the Communists). (Note: Also known as the Torekov Agreement (Swedish: Torekovsövernskommelsen). The participants were Valter Åman (s), Bertil Fiskesjö (c), Birger Lundström (fp) and Allan Hernelius (m).) It mandated that the monarchy would remain largely as it was but would become entirely ceremonial, without any residual political powers left.

Following the required double Riksdag votes that took place in 1973 and 1974, a new Instrument of Government was brought into effect. The monarch's functions and duties, as defined in the 1974 Constitution Act, include heading the special cabinet council held when there is a change of government, but no executive powers with respect to the governance of the realm are vested in him.

Carl XVI Gustaf became king on 15 September 1973 on the death of his grandfather Gustaf VI Adolf and because of his father's early death has become the longest reigning monarch in Swedish history. His King's Golden Jubilee was celebrated in 2023. Leading up to that year and including it, beginning already in 2018, some of the most serious criticism ever published took place about Carl Gustaf and the way the monarchy has developed during his reign.

== Constitutional and official role ==
When, on 1 January 1975, it replaced the Instrument of Government of 1809 as part of the Constitution of Sweden, the Instrument of Government of 1974 (Swedish: 1974 års regeringsform) transformed the advisory Council of State (Statsrådet) into the collegial Government (Regeringen), to which all executive power was transferred. Responsibility for nominating and dismissing the prime minister (who, since 1975, is elected by the Riksdag) was transferred to the Speaker of the Riksdag; the prime minister appoints and dismisses the other ministers at his or her discretion. (Note: The Speaker of the Riksdag, not the Prime Minister, is considered the second highest public office in the order of precedence, below the head of state.) Furthermore, bills passed by the Riksdag become law without royal assent: the prime minister or any other cabinet minister signs them "On Behalf of the Government" (På regeringens vägnar).

Although the unwritten precedent was set in 1917, when Gustaf V had little choice but to support the idea of a parliamentary system and promised Prime Minister Nils Edén to stop seeking advice from secret advisors other than the duly appointed cabinet ministers and not to interfere in politics again; the Torekov compromise, struck in 1971 by the four major parties at the time, provided, and continues to provide, a majority consensus in Swedish political discourse on the role of the monarchy within the constitutional framework. The official motive for the radical changes which came to pass in 1975 was for it to be as descriptive as possible of the workings of the state and clear on how decisions actually are made. Minister of Justice Lennart Geijer further remarked on the 1973 government bill that any continued pretensions of royal involvement in government decision making would be of a "fictitious nature" and therefore "highly unsatisfactory".

Thus, the monarch lost all formal executive powers, becoming a ceremonial and representative figurehead. The monarch, while explicitly referred to as the "Head of State" (Statschefen) in the 1974 Instrument of Government, (Note: Such as in the first article in which the monarch is mentioned: Art. 5. The King or Queen who occupies the throne of Sweden in accordance with the Act of Succession shall be the Head of State.) is not even the nominal chief executive. (Note: Given their predominance in 20th century Swedish politics, the public positions taken by the leaders of the Social Democrats are noteworthy; particularly given that their party programme does call for the abolishment of the monarchy. Party leaders and prime ministers Hjalmar Branting, Per-Albin Hansson and Tage Erlander all made statements to the effect of being for a republic in principle whenever the issue was raised, but that it was not worth pursuing (presumably fearing an electoral backlash). At the 1972 party congress of the Social Democrats, Prime Minister Olof Palme publicly defended the Torekov compromise, in response some members that yearned for a republic, by famously characterizing that the upcoming reforms would reduce the constitutional role of the monarchy to nothing but a "plume" (plym) and thus paving the way to abolish the monarchy with the stroke of a pen (penndrag) at some distant point in the future. Palme emphasized though that other reforms were far more important for the Social Democrats than abolishing the monarchy. Successive leaders (and prime ministers) Ingvar Carlsson and Göran Persson have also defended the status quo.) The Instrument of Government of 1974 does grant the person serving as king or queen regnant absolute immunity from criminal (but not civil) charges for as long as he or she remains in office. (Note: This could be interpreted as "for life", given the historical precedent: no voluntary abdication has occurred since Ulrika Eleonora, in 1719 and only three hereditary monarchs have been involuntarily deposed (Eric XIV in 1568, Sigisumnd 1599, and Gustav IV Adolf in 1809).) The monarch therefore cannot be prosecuted or otherwise held to account for his or her actions, both official and private, in judicial proceedings. None of the other members of the royal family or the employees the Royal Court enjoy similar immunity.

At the request of the Speaker of the Riksdag, the monarch opens the annual session of the Riksdag (Riksmötets öppnande) in the chamber of the Riksdag building. (Note: The Riksdag Act provision in question reads: Special meeting for the opening of the Riksdag session Art. 6. A special meeting of the Chamber for the formal opening of a Riksdag session takes place no later than the third day of the session. At the request of the Speaker, the Head of State declares the session open. If the Head of State is unable to attend, the Speaker declares the session open. At this meeting, the Prime Minister delivers a statement of Government policy unless there are special grounds why he or she should refrain from doing so. Time of meeting for the opening of the Riksdag session Supplementary provision 3.6.1 The formal opening of the session after an election to the Riksdag takes place at 2 p.m. on the second day of the session. In years in which no election to the Riksdag has been held, the formal opening takes place on the first day of the session at the same time. The Speaker may appoint another time for the meeting.) The king or queen regnant also receives Letters of Credence of foreign ambassadors sent to Sweden and signs those of Swedish ambassadors sent abroad. The monarch also chairs the Cabinet Council (skifteskonselj) in a session that establishes the new government following a general election or major cabinet reshuffle and also chairs information councils (informationskonselj) approximately four times a year to get information from the assembled Government, apart from that given by ministers in individual audiences or through other means. Formally, it is the explicit responsibility of the prime minister to keep the monarch informed on the affairs of the realm; the failure to do so following the 2004 tsunami disaster in the Indian Ocean (in which many Swedes perished) gave rise to wide criticism of Prime Minister Göran Persson for his handling of the matter. The monarch also chairs the Advisory Council on Foreign Affairs (Utrikesnämnden), a body that enables the government of the day to inform not only the head of state, but also the speaker and representatives of the opposition parties in the Riksdag, on foreign affairs issues in a confidential manner.

While the monarch is no longer the commander-in-chief (högste befälhavare) of the Swedish Armed Forces, as he once was under the 1809 Instrument of Government, he is the foremost representative of the Swedish defence establishment and holds supreme rank in each of the service arms. He ranks as a four star admiral in the Swedish Navy and general in the Swedish Army and Air Force. As part of his court, the monarch has a military staff, which is headed by a senior officer (usually a general or admiral, retired from active service) and includes active duty military officers serving as aides-de-camp to the monarch and his or her family.

== Cultural role ==
The monarch and members of the Royal Family undertake a variety of official, unofficial and other representative duties within Sweden and abroad. The monarch and his or her family play a central role in state visits to Sweden and conduct state visits to other nations on behalf of Sweden. Other members of the Royal Family may also represent the country abroad at lesser functions.

The royal standard used by the monarch

Many of the Swedish general flag flying days have direct royal connections; among them are the name days of the King (28 January), the Queen (8 August), and the Crown Princess (12 March); the birthdays of the King (30 April), the Queen (23 December), and the Crown Princess (14 July); and Gustavus Adolphus Day (Swedish: Gustav Adolfsdagen), on 6 November, in memory of King Gustavus Adolphus, who was killed on that date (old style) in 1632 in the Battle of Lützen. (Note: According to the Gregorian calendar, the king died on 16 November, but the Julian calendar ("old style") was still used in Protestant Sweden at the time and the same date is still used now.) None of these flag days are public holidays, however. (Note: Flag days are regulated by an ordinance issued by the Government of Sweden. This means that the national flag is flown on all public flag poles and buildings on those dates.)

Perhaps the most globally known ceremony in which the Royal Family annually participate is the Nobel Prize award ceremony held at the Stockholm Concert Hall (and the subsequent banquet in the Stockholm City Hall), where the monarch hands out the Nobel Prizes on behalf of the Nobel Foundation for outstanding contributions to mankind in physics, chemistry, literature, physiology or medicine, and the economic sciences.

Eriksgata was the name of the traditional journey of newly elected medieval Swedish kings through important provinces to have their election confirmed by local Things. The actual election took place at the Stone of Mora in Uppland and participation was originally restricted to the people of that area; hence, the need of having the election confirmed by the other parts of the realm. The Eriksgata gradually lost its importance when, as of the 14th century, representatives of other parts of Sweden began to participate in the election. After 1544, when hereditary monarchy was instituted, that meant that the Eriksgata had little practical importance. The last king to travel the Eriksgata according to the old tradition was Charles IX, whose reign began in 1604. Later, kings, up until present times, have made visits to all the Swedish provinces and called them an Eriksgata, while those visits bear little resemblance to the medieval tradition.

== Titles ==
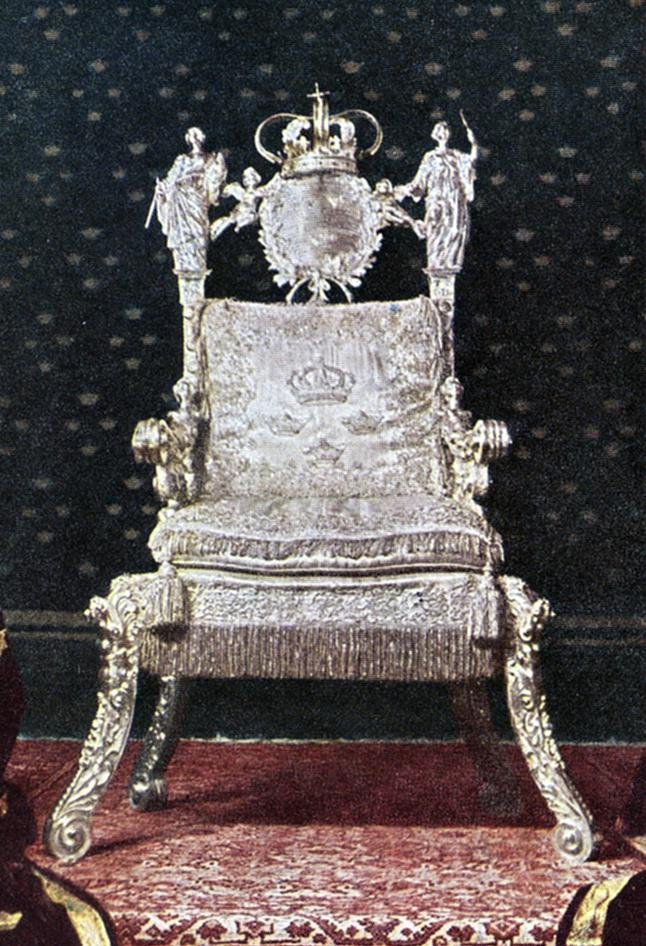
The Silver Throne, used by all Swedish monarchs from Queen Christina in 1650 onward

=== Monarch ===
The full title of the Swedish monarch from 1523 to 1973 was:

In Swedish: Med Guds Nåde Sveriges, Götes och Vendes Konung
In Latin: Dei Gratia Suecorum, Gothorum et Vandalorum Rex

Translated as "By the Grace of God, King of the Swedes, the Goths, and the Wends"

During the reign of the House of Holstein-Gottorp from 1751 to 1818, the title Heir to Norway (Arvinge till Norge) was also used, as well as other titles connected to the Dukes of Holstein-Gottorp. When, after the Napoleonic Wars, Norway was in personal union with Sweden, the title included King of Norway, in older Swedish spellings: Sweriges, Norriges, Göthes och Wendes Konung.

Upon his accession, Carl XVI Gustaf chose for his title simply Sveriges Konung (King of Sweden).

=== Dynasts ===
The customary title of the heir apparent is crown prince (kronprins) or crown princess (kronprinsessa). The wife of a crown prince would also receive a corresponding title, but not the husband of a crown princess. The traditional official title used until 1980 for other dynastic male heirs was hereditary prince (arvfurste), although the word prince (prins) was used in constitutional legal texts such as the Act of Succession and also colloquially and informally. Female dynasts are titled princess (prinsessa).

The Swedish Succession Act was altered in 1980 to allow for female succession to the throne.

=== Ducal titles ===
King Gustav III revived a tradition from the time of Gustav Vasa and the medieval era by giving male heirs to the throne ducal titles of Swedish provinces. The difference between the ducal titles from the Vasa era and those granted by Gustav III is they now are non-hereditary courtesy titles given at birth. Since 1980, they have been conferred to all royal heirs, male and female. The wives of royal dukes have always shared their husbands' titles; the husbands of royal duchesses have done so as of 2010.

== Symbols of the monarchy ==
=== Regalia ===
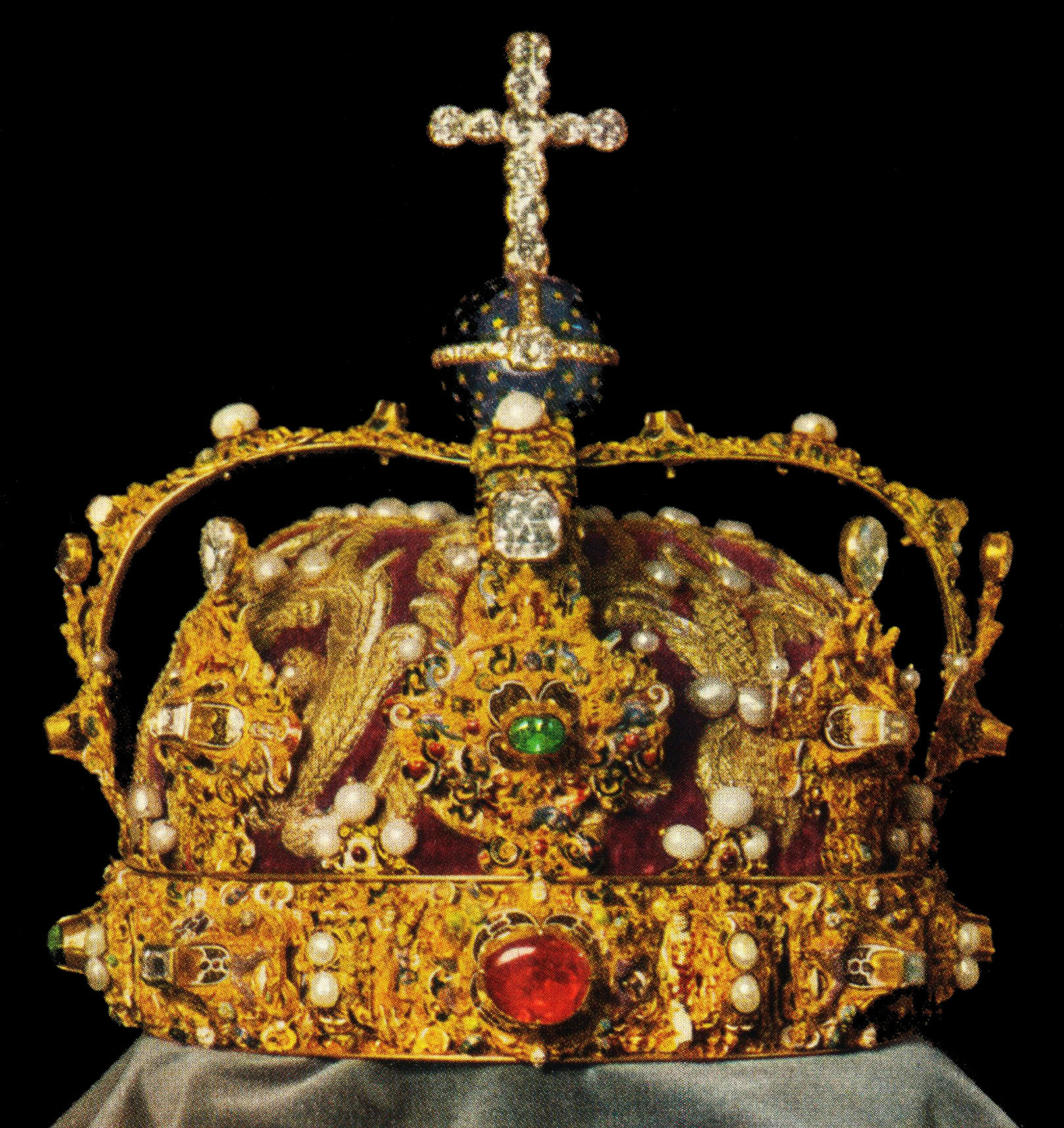
The Crown of Eric XIV

The regalia of Sweden are kept deep in the vaults of the Treasury chamber (Swedish: Skattkammaren), located underneath the Royal Palace in Stockholm, in a museum which has been open to the public since 1970. Among the oldest objects in the collection are the sword of Gustav Vasa and the crown, orb, sceptre and key of King Erik XIV. The Regalia is state property and the government authority which holds it in trust is the Legal, Financial and Administrative Services Agency.

The last king to have been crowned was Oscar II. His son and successor, Gustaf V, abstained from having a coronation. While the crowns and coronets have not been worn by Swedish royalty since 1907, they are nevertheless still displayed on royal occasions such as at weddings, christenings and funerals. Until 1974, the crown and sceptre were also displayed on cushions beside the Silver Throne at the annual solemn opening of the Riksdag (Swedish: Riksdagens högtidliga öppnande).

=== Royal orders of chivalry ===
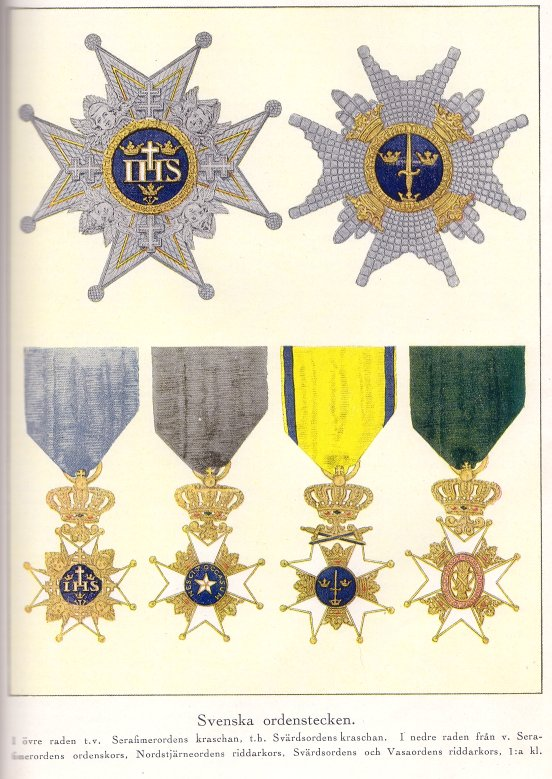
The Royal Orders of Sweden constituting the Royal Order of Knights

The Royal orders have a historical basis, dating back to the 1606 founding of the now extinct Jehova Order. The Royal Orders of Knights of Sweden were only truly codified in the 18th century, with their formal foundation in 1748 by King Frederick I. In 1974 the Riksdag significantly changed the conditions and criteria under which orders and decorations could be awarded: that no Swedish citizen outside the Royal Family is eligible to receive such decorations. The Order of the Seraphim (Swedish: Serafimerorden) is only awarded to foreign heads of state and members of the Swedish and foreign royal families, while the Order of the Polar Star (Swedish: Nordstjärneorden) was only to be bestowed on any non-Swedish citizen. Following the reforms, the Order of the Sword (Swedish: Svärdsorden) and the Order of Vasa (Swedish: Vasaorden) were no longer conferred: officially they were declared as "dormant". In 2022 the government proposed a new reform taking effect in 2023 that once again opened the Royal Orders so that they now may be awarded to Swedish citizens again. The Order of the Seraphim however was not affected by these changes.

Between 1975 and 2023, H. M. The King's Medal (Swedish: H.M. Konungens medalj) was the highest honour that could be awarded to Swedish citizens other than members of the Royal Family.

=== Royal residences ===
The Royal Palaces (including the Royal Palace in Stockholm, Drottningholm Palace, Haga Palace, Rosendal Palace, Ulriksdal Palace, Rosersberg Palace, Tullgarn Palace and Gripsholm Castle) are government property, managed by the National Property Board (Swedish: Statens fastighetsverk) and are at the disposal of the Monarch, an arrangement that has been in place since the beginning of the 19th century. There are also residences which are held privately by the Royal Family, such as Solliden Palace on the island of Öland, a cottage in Storlien in the Jämtland and Villa Mirage in Sainte-Maxime in southern France (originally acquired by Prince Bertil).

==== Royal Palace ====
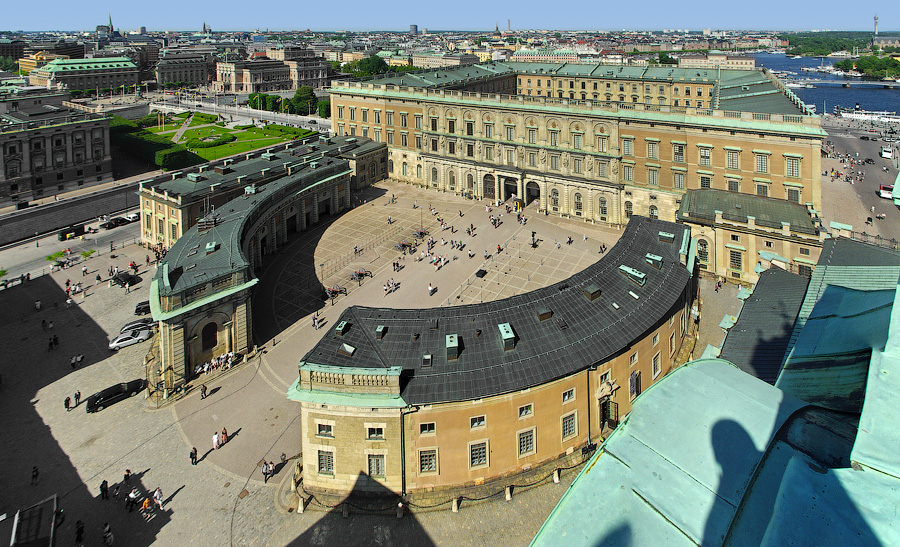
The Royal Palace in Stockholm, as seen from the tower of the Cathedral

The Royal Palace (Kungliga slottet), also known as Stockholm Palace (Swedish: Stockholms slott), is the official residence of the king. The Royal Palace is located on Stadsholmen ("City Island"), commonly known as Gamla Stan ("the Old Town") in the national capital city Stockholm.

The offices of the king, other members of the Swedish Royal Family, and the offices of the Royal Court are located in the palace. The Royal Palace is used for representative purposes and State occasions by the king. The Royal Palace is guarded by Högvakten, a royal guard, consisting of regular service members of the Swedish Armed Forces. The tradition of having a regular unit of the Army guarding at the royal residence dates back to 1523. Until the mid-19th century, the royal guards also maintained law and order in the city and provided firefighting services.

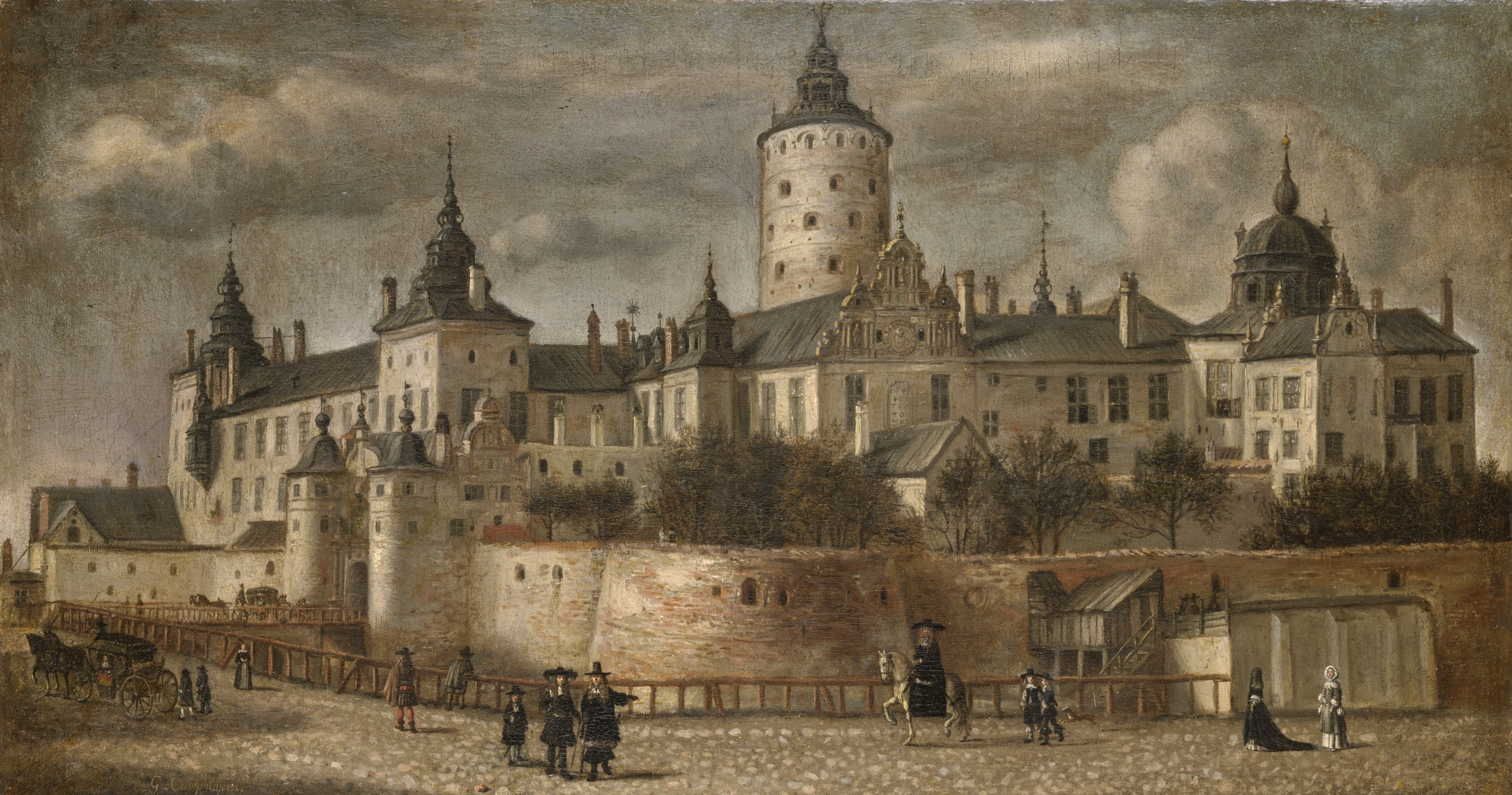
The castle Tre Kronor, located on the site of today's palace, in a painting from 1661 by Govert Dircksz Camphuysen

The southern façade faces the grand style slope Slottsbacken; the eastern façade borders Skeppsbron, a quay which passes along the eastern waterfront of the old town; on the northern front Lejonbacken is a system of ramps named for the Medici lions, sculptures on the stone railings; and the western wings border the open space Högvaktsterrassen. The Royal Palace in Stockholm is unique among European royal residences in that large portions of it are open year-round to visitors, who pay entrance fees.

The first building on this site was a fortress with a keep built in the 13th century by Birger Jarl to defend the entry into Lake Mälaren. The fortress gradually grew to a castle, known as Tre Kronor: named after the spire on the centre tower with Three Crowns, which have become the Swedish national symbol. (Note: The Stockholm City Hall, built in 1927, has a similar spire with Three Crowns on its tower.) In the late 16th century, work was done to transform the castle into a Renaissance palace during the reign of John III. In 1690, it was decided that the castle be rebuilt in Baroque style in a design by Nicodemus Tessin the Younger. In 1692, work began on the northern row. However, much of the old castle was destroyed in a disastrous fire on 7 May 1697.

Tessin rebuilt the damaged palace, and work continued for another 63 years. Semicircular wings around the outer western courtyard were finished in 1734, the palace church was finished in the 1740s, and the exterior was finished in 1754. The royal family moved to the palace with the southwest, southeast, and northeast wings finished. The northwest wing was finished in 1760. In the north, Lejonbacken (the "Lion's Slope") was rebuilt from 1824 to 1830.

==== Drottningholm Palace ====
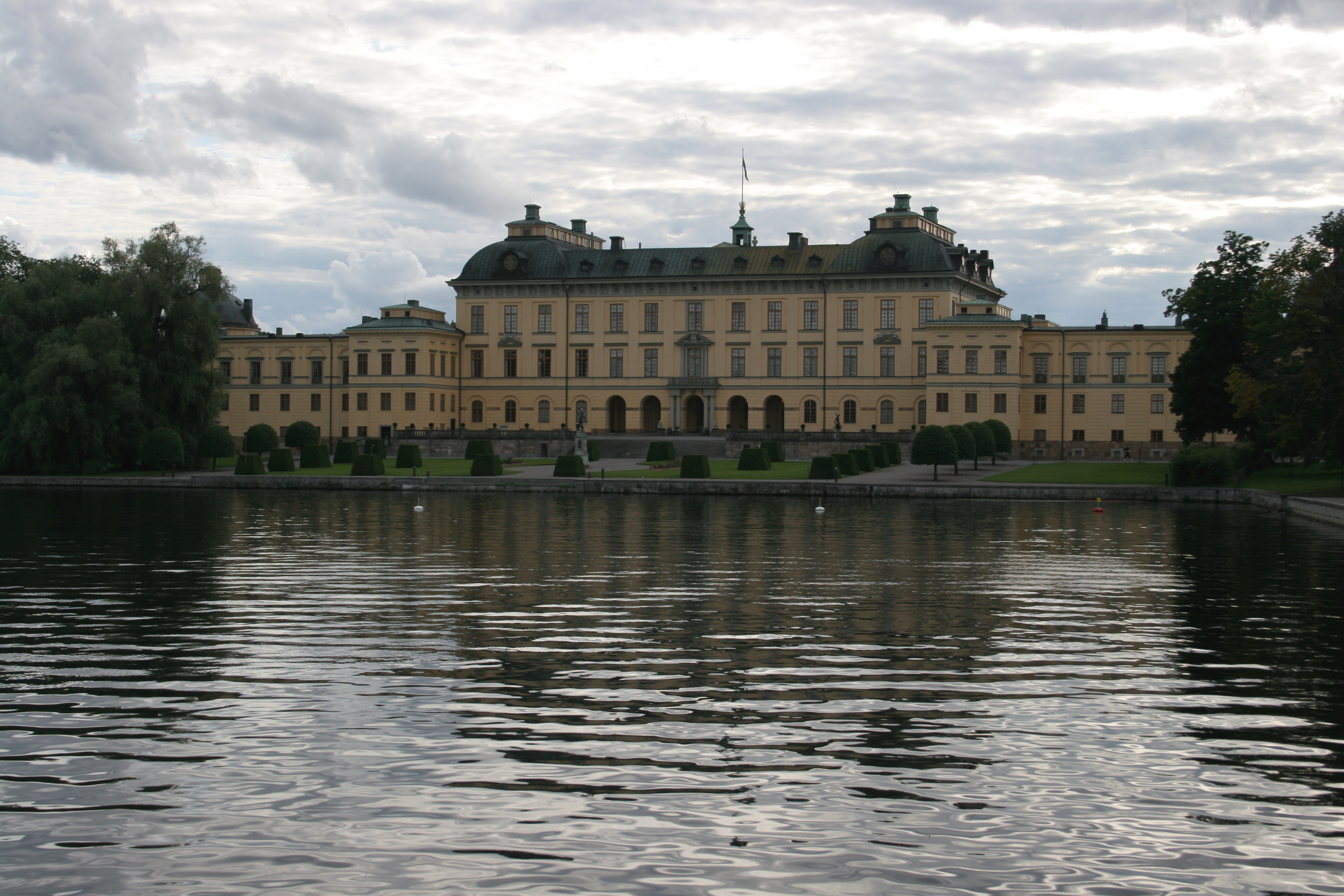
Drottningholm Palace, a UNESCO World Heritage Site, is the home residence of the King and Queen.

Drottningholm Palace (Swedish: Drottningholms slott) is located at Drottningholm on the island of Lovön (in Ekerö Municipality of Stockholm County), and is one of Sweden's Royal Palaces. It was originally built in the late 16th century. It has served as a residence of the Swedish royal family members for most of the 18th and 19th centuries. Apart from being the current private residence of the King and Queen, Drottningholm Palace is a popular tourist attraction.

The gardens and park areas surrounding Drottningholm Palace and adjacent to its buildings are one of the main attractions for the tourists that visit the palace each year. The gardens have been established in stages since the palace was first built, resulting in many different styles.

The royal domain of Drottningholm is a well-preserved milieu from the 17th and 18th centuries, inspired by French buildings such as the Chateau of Versailles, and is a UNESCO World Heritage Site, principally because of the Drottningholm Palace Theatre and the Chinese Pavilion at Drottningholm. It was added to the World Heritage List in 1991.

==== Haga Palace ====
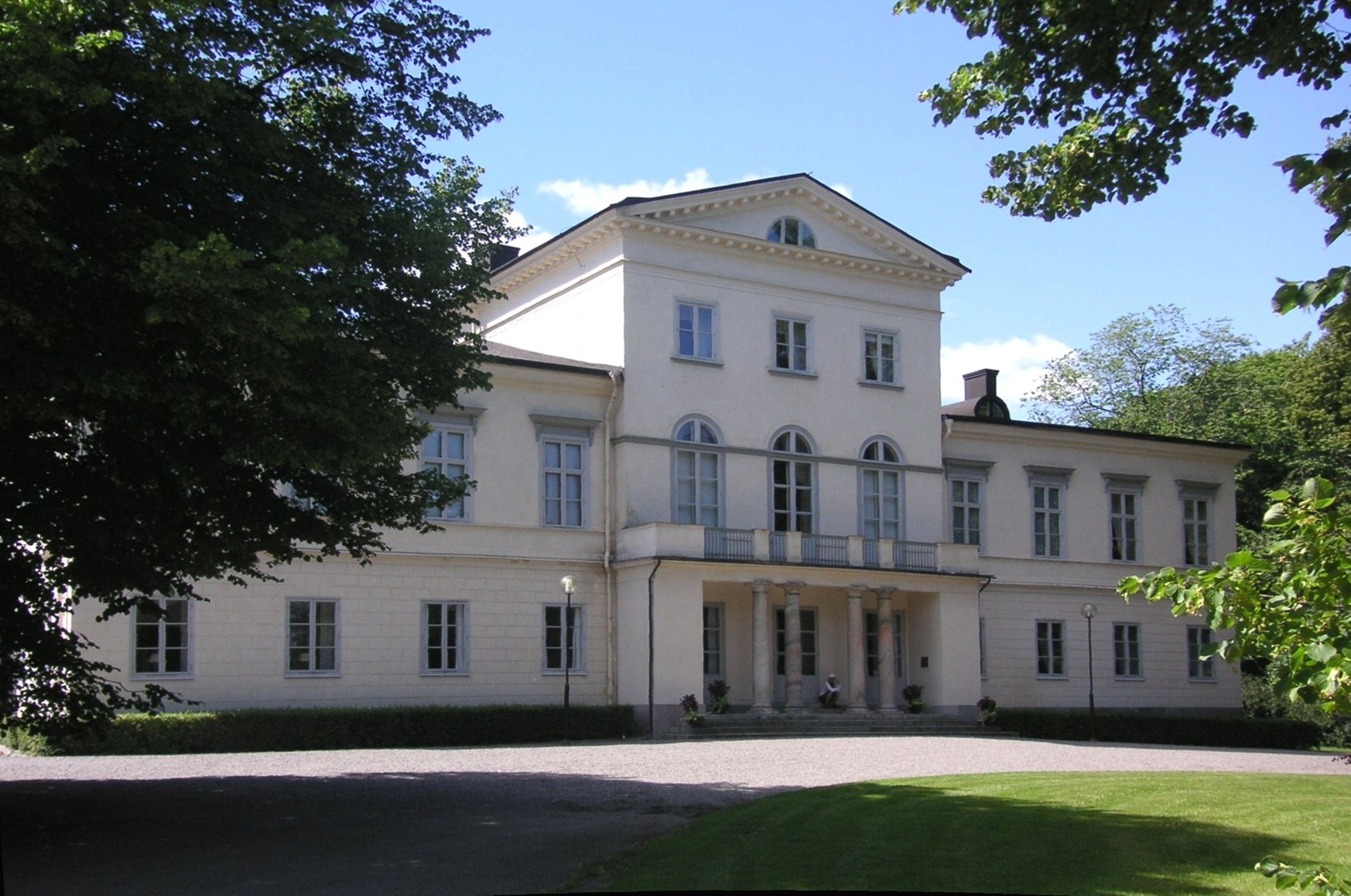
Haga Palace is the residence of Crown Princess Victoria and her family.

Haga Palace (Swedish: Haga slott), formerly known as the Queen's Pavilion (Swedish: Drottningens paviljong), is located in the Haga Park, Solna Municipality in Metropolitan Stockholm. The palace, built between 1802 – 1805, was modelled after balletmaster Louis Gallodier's Italian villa at Drottningholm by architect Carl Christoffer Gjörwell on appointment by King Gustaf IV Adolf for the royal children. It has been the home or summer house of several members of the Swedish royal family – notably it was the birthplace of the present King Carl XVI Gustaf – until 1966 when King Gustaf VI Adolf transferred its disposal to the prime minister and it was turned into a guest house for distinguished foreign official visitors (heads of state and heads of government et cetera).

In April 2009, it was announced by Prime Minister Fredrik Reinfeldt that the rights of disposal of the palace would be transferred back to the King and thus could be used by Crown Princess Victoria and her husband, Prince Daniel, Duke of Västergötland. They moved into the palace in the autumn after their wedding on 19 June 2010.

== Royal Family ==
The Swedish royal family is, according to the Royal Court, currently categorized into three groups;

- first, those with royal titles and style (manner of address) who perform official and unofficial engagements for the nation, are the members of the Royal Family (Swedish: Kungafamiljen) (currently this category only includes the King, Queen and their descendants, including spouses);
- second, those with royal titles and style (manner of address) who perform no official engagements (Swedish: Kungliga Huset, usually stylized with the shortform Kungl. Huset);
- and third, the extended family of the King (Swedish: Kungliga Familjens övriga medlemmar, usually stylized with the shortform Kungl. Familjens övriga medlemmar) which is other close relatives who are not dynasts and thus do not represent the country officially.

However, in any case, there is no legislation or other public document which delineates the rules of membership in either the Royal House or Royal Family, as it is left to the sole discretion of the King.

=== The line of succession ===
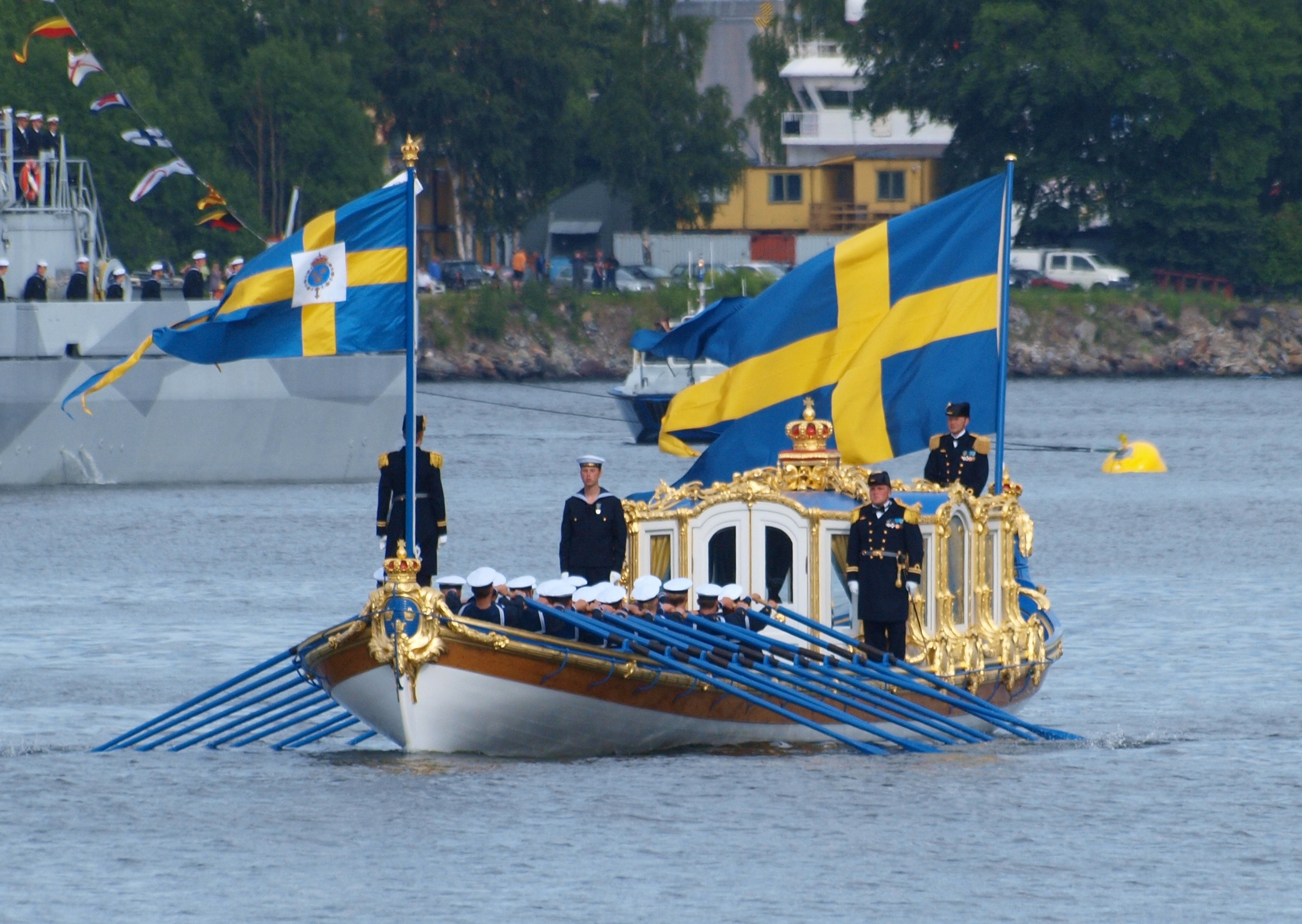
The royal barge Vasaorden

The Act of Succession of 1810 provides the rules governing the line of succession and designates the legitimate heirs to the Swedish Throne; it also states in article 4 that the Monarch and dynastic members of the Royal House must at all times be a Protestant Christian of the pure evangelical faith (by implication the Evangelical-Lutheran Church of Sweden).

A rewrite of the Act, entering into force in 1980, fundamentally changed the rules of succession from agnatic primogeniture to absolute primogeniture. This allowed for the crown to pass to the eldest child regardless of gender and thus retroactively installed Princess Victoria as crown princess over her younger brother, Prince Carl Philip, who had been born as crown prince a few months before.

In its present reading, Article 1 of the Act of Succession limits the potential number of claimants to the throne, so that only the descendants of Carl XVI Gustaf can inherit the Throne. If the royal house were to be extinct, the Riksdag is not obligated to elect a new royal house, as it once was up until the constitutional reforms of the 1970s.

== See also ==
- Courtyard Crisis
- Eriksgata
- Guadeloupe Fund
- Kungssången
- List of heirs to the Swedish throne
- List of Royal Warrant Holders of the Swedish court
- List of Swedish consorts
- List of Swedish monarchs
- List of titles and honours of the Swedish Crown
- Livrustkammaren
- Oath of Allegiance (Sweden)
- Order of Charles XIII
- Order of the Polar Star
- Order of the Sword
- Order of Vasa
- Republicanism in Sweden
- Riddarholm Church
- Royal Court of Sweden
- Royal mottos of Swedish monarchs
- Royal Order of the Seraphim
- Stones of Mora
- Swedish order of precedence
- Swedish Royal Academies
- Swedish royal family
- Swedish Security Service
- Union between Sweden and Norway
