= List of titles and honours of the Swedish Crown =

The list of titles and honours of the Swedish Crown sets out the many titles of the monarch of Sweden since the creation of hereditary monarchy of the Kingdom of Sweden in 1544.

== Titles held by the monarch of Sweden ==
Note: Former titles marked with * are historical titles which are abolished or no longer part of the Swedish crown.

=== Kingdoms and Princely States ===
Coat of Arms	Kingdoms and Princely States	Date formed	Date if abolished
	King of Sweden	14th century – present	
	King of the Swedes *	c. 1000	14th century
	King of the Goths *	12th century	1973
	King of the Wends *	1540	1973
	Grand Duke of Finland *	1581	1720
	King of Norway *	1814	1905
=== Duchies ===
	Duke of Scania *	1658	?
	Duke of Estonia *	1581	1721
	Duke of Livonia *	1629	1721
	Duke of Karelia *	1617	1721
	Duke of Bremen *	1648	1718
	Duke of Verden *	1648	1720
	Duke of Pomerania *	1648	1814
	Duke in Bavaria *	1654	1718
	Duke of Jülich *	1654	1718
	Duke of Cleves *	1654	1718
	Duke of Berg *	1654	1718
=== Count Palatine ===
	Count Palatine by the Rhine in Bavaria *	1654	1718
=== Counties ===
	Count of Zweibrücken–Kleeburg *	1654	1718
	Count of Veldenz *	1654	1718
	Count of Spanheim *	1654	1718
	Count of Ravensberg *	1654	1718
=== Lordships ===
	Lord of Ingria *	1617	1721
	Lord of Wismar *	1648	1903 (1803)
	Lord of Ravenstein *	1654	1718
=== Orders of Sweden ===
	Grand Master of the Royal Order of the Seraphim	1748 – present	
	Lord and Master of the Royal Order of the Sword	1748 – present	
	Grand Master of the Royal Order of the Polar Star	1748 – present	
	Lord and Master of the Royal Order of Vasa	1748 – present	
	Lord and Master of the Royal Order of Charles XIII	1811 – present	

== Titles held by the heir apparent of Sweden ==
- Crown Prince of Sweden (1778 – present)
- Hereditary Prince of Sweden (1544 – 1778)
