= Order of the Seraphim =

Swedish order of chivalry

The Royal Order of the Seraphim Kungliga Serafimerorden
- Collar and badge of the Order of the Seraphim

Awarded by Monarch of Sweden
- Type: Single grade order of merit
- Established: February 23, 1748; 278 years ago
- Country: Sweden
- Royal house: Bernadotte
- Religious affiliation: Christianity
- Motto: Iesus Hominum Salvator (IHS)
- Eligibility: Swedish and foreign nationals
- Awarded for: services to Sweden
- Status: Currently constituted
- Founder: Frederick I of Sweden
- Sovereign: King Carl XVI Gustaf
- Chancellor: Svante Lindqvist
- Grades: Since 2023: Knight (RSerafO); Prior 2023: Knight/Member (of the Cloth) (general: RSerafO/LSerafO, Swedes: RoKavKMO/LoKavKMO)

Statistics
- First induction: 1748, Frederick I of Sweden
- Last induction: 10 March 2026, President of Poland Karol Nawrocki
- Total inductees: 891

Precedence
- Next (higher): None (highest)
- Next (lower): Royal Order of the Sword
- Ribbon bar of the Royal Order of the Seraphim

The Royal Order of the Seraphim (Swedish: Kungliga Serafimerorden; Seraphim being a category of angels) is the highest order of chivalry of the Kingdom of Sweden. It was created by King Frederick I on 23 February 1748, together with the Order of the Sword and the Order of the Polar Star. The order has only one class with the dignity of Knight. Since 2023, no distinction is made anymore, but prior to that, only men were designated as knights, while women and priests who received the order were referred to as Member and Member of the Cloth, respectively.

The Collar may be bestowed upon Knights of the Order of the Seraphim as a special mark of honor and is not automatically included upon conferral. This change, regarding the Collar being awarded only as a special honor, was implemented in 1975.

The three above-mentioned Orders together with the Order of Vasa form the Orders of His Majesty the King (Swedish Kungl. Maj:ts Orden). A Swedish Knight of the Order of the Seraphim is not referred to as a Knight of the Seraphim, but rather as a Knight and Commander of the Orders of His Majesty the King's Orden (Swedish: Riddare och Kommendör av Kunglig Majestäts Orden). This form is used because the Swedish word orden is an old plural form which indicates that a knight has to be a Commander Grand Cross or Commander of at least one of the other Swedish Orders. Foreign Knights are for the greater part Knights of the Order of the Seraphim. A Knight of the Order may be styled "Herr" + surname, which used to be the formal style for Swedish secular Knights (untitled high-ranking noblemen) appointed by the Swedish King, a practice that ceased in the 17th century.

When originally instituted the knights of the Order were required to supervise the major hospitals and mental asylums in Sweden, and in particular, the Seraphim Hospital, which was a major hospital in Stockholm until it was closed in 1980. This requirement would die out as boards of physicians and other professionals made such supervision by the Knights of the Seraphim anachronistic during the course of the 19th century.

As part of the reorganization of Swedish orders in 1975, appointments of Swedish citizens to the various orders ceased and conferrals were restricted to foreigners (the last non-royal Swedish holder was Sten Rudholm). Likewise, the Order of the Seraphim was restricted to foreign heads of state and equivalents. In 1995, the law was revised and conferrals upon members of the royal family were allowed. On 20 December 2022, the Swedish Government published a new regulation that repealed the 1974 regulation, and once again opened the Royal Orders to Swedish citizens again, which came into effect from 1 February 2023.

== History ==
=== Crusading Order ===
In the Middle Ages, an order was founded, Knights of the Name of Jesus, who was also known as the Seraphim. Although some sources trace it back to 1280, there is more compelling evidence that it was created around the 1330s. It may have also been active in Norway. The order as a crusading order was disbanded in the Reformation.

=== Chivalric Order ===
The medieval custom of new crowned monarchs dubbing knights at their coronations as a way of specially honoring particular noblemen was apparently accompanied in Sweden with the gift of a chain apparently specially designed for the occasion. These chains did not indicate the initiation into an order of chivalry as this is usually understood, since the bestowal of a chain of a particular design only occurred at a particular coronation and was not repeated at any other coronations or royal event. The description of some of these chains from the some of pre-Vasa coronations states that they consisted of alternating link of seraphim heads and patriarchal crosses, thus perhaps creating the later impression that there had been an earlier order of the Seraphim of which the 1748 order was seen as a revival. It seems reasonable to assume, at very least, that the accounts of these earlier knightly collars influenced the choice of design for the collar of the 1748 order.

This medieval custom survived into the period of the Vasa dynasty as well, for Eric XIV is known to have bestowed the Order of the Saviour at his coronation in 1561. Similarly, John III had bestowed the Order of the Lamb of God (Agnus Dei) in 1569. It is noteworthy that a contemporary representation of this order shows a collar of alternating red-enameled seraphim heads and gold patriarchal crosses from which hangs as pendant an oval badge enameled blue and bearing the Greek letters of the Christogram IHS (Iesus Hominum Salvator) with a cross above and the three nails of the Passion below between the three crowns of the Swedish royal arms—the same as the central medallion of the latter Order of the Seraphim. Charles IX bestowed the Royal Order of Jehova or Jehova Order at his coronation in 1606—perhaps as Calvinist alternative or reaction to the Catholic devotion to the Name of Jesus implied in his brother's coronation order. Charles X Gustav's Order of the Name of Jesus took the form of a similar circular medallion bearing the letters IHS in diamonds surrounded by a border of diamonds in the center of a cross formed of four enameled Vasa sheaves and hanging from a pink ribbon worn around the neck, of which one example survives in the collections of the Royal Armory. Queen Christina founded an Order of the Amaranth, although apparently not at her coronation, but it also did not survive her reign. Because of these previous orders the first set of statutes described the Order as "revived".

The French Order of the Holy Spirit may have inspired the idea of placing the earlier medallion of the Name of Jesus in the center of a white enameled Maltese cross with gold Seraphim heads between the arms of this cross guarding this medallion with their wings, just as the French order bore the white dove of the Holy Spirit surrounded by green flames on similar white Maltese cross. Also like the French royal orders of chivalry the breast stars of the Swedish orders similarly took the form of silver crosses.

Associated with the Order was the Seraphim Medal awarded to people who made significant contributions to Swedish charities, especially to the hospitals and mental asylums patronized by the Order. This medal consisted a gold coin-like representation of the bust of the Order's founder, King Frederick I, beneath a royal crown hanging by eight small chains from a suspension bar ornamented with a design of acanthus leaves.

The Order of the Seraphim is sometimes listed as a dynastic order, but its status is actually more complex. The Order of the Seraphim has a semi-dynastic or state-royal character. It is awarded by the King and is highly exclusive, but since it remains part of the Swedish state order system (and not a private royal order), it is not a dynastic order in the strict sense, like the Danish Order of the Elephant or the British Order of the Garter.

== Royal family ==
Until 1975 the sons of the Swedish monarch received a miniature version of the order's insignia at their baptism. As part of a reform on orders and decorations, a law was passed in 1974 restricting the conferral of orders to foreign citizens. This law was revised in 1995 to allow members of the Swedish Royal Family to receive the order. That year, on her 18th birthday, Crown Princess Victoria became a member of the order. Prince Carl Philip and Princess Madeline likewise became a knight/member of the order on their 18th birthday. The tradition of conferring the order upon the baptism of a member of the royal family returned when Princess Estelle, the first-born of Crown Princess Victoria and Prince Daniel, received a miniature of the Order's insignia from her grandfather, King Carl XVI Gustaf, at her baptism on 22 May 2012. Princess Leonore, daughter of Princess Madeleine and Christopher O'Neill, was also conferred the order at her baptism on 8 June 2014.

== Insignia and habits ==
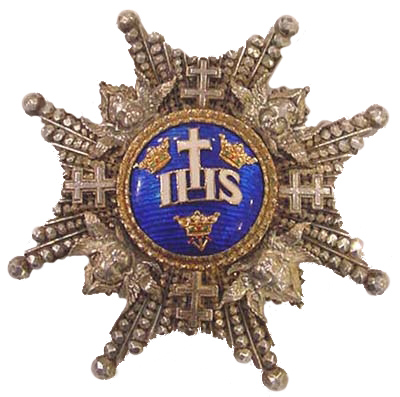
Star of the order.

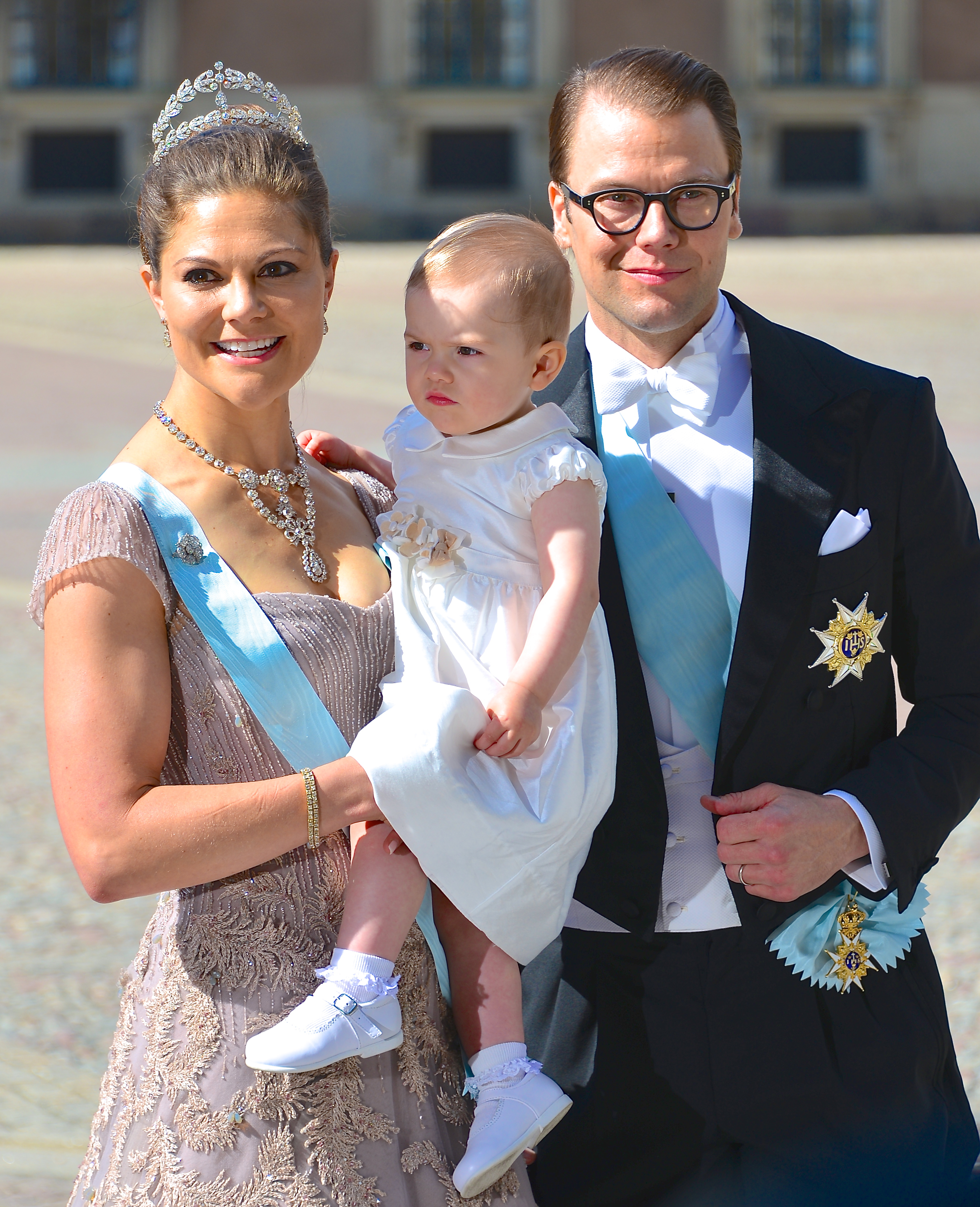
Sash and star as worn by Victoria, Crown Princess of Sweden and her husband Prince Daniel, Duke of Västergötland

Knights and Members of the Order wear the badge on a collar (chain) or on a sash from the right shoulder, and the star on the left chest:

- The collar of the Order is in gold, with eleven patriarchal crosses enamelled in turquoise blue and eleven gold seraphim, each represented as a child's head surrounded by six wings, each with a slightly different facial expression.
- The badge of the Order is a white-enamelled gold Maltese Cross, with a gold patriarchal cross on each arm of the cross, and gold seraphim between the arms of the cross and framing with their wings the central medallion. The obverse central medallion is in blue enamel, with a white-enamelled "IHS" Christogram between three gold crowns, beneath which are represented the three nails with which Jesus Christ was crucified. The reverse central medallion is also in blue enamel, with the white-enamelled letters "FRS" (Fredericus, Rex Sueciae, Frederick King of Sweden), the founder of the Order. The badge hangs from a gold and enamelled royal crown. The infant-sized badge is slightly smaller than the regular one.
- The star of the Order is the same as the obverse of the badge without the royal crown, except that the star is entirely of silver and only the central medallion is enamelled as on the badge but larger.
- The ribbon (sash) of the Order is pale blue, referred to in Sweden as seraphim blue. The infant-sized sash is significantly smaller than the regular one.

=== Habits of the Order ===
Formerly Knights of the Order also had two distinctive habits, worn on special and formal occasions such as coronations, chapters, etc. They were called the Great Habit and the Lesser Habit.

- The Great Habit was in black and white. The habit included white satin breeches and doublet, with black buttons and trimmed in black lace, over which was worn a black satin mantle, lined with white satin and also trimmed in black lace and a white collar. Both the doublet and the mantle bore the star of the Order embroidered over the left breast and the habit included a pair of white boots with black toes and heels and trimmed in black lace and gilded spurs and a black top hat with a white satin hat band and a plume of white ostrich and black egret feathers.
- The Lesser Habit was in amaranth purple and pale gold. This habit had amaranth velvet breeches and doublet with padded shoulders and pale gold buttons, piping and cuffs and a pale gold satin tasseled sash around the waist, over which was worn an amaranth purple satin mantle lined with pale gold satin and with a pale gold collar. The star of the Order was also embroidered over the left breast on both the mantle and the waistcoat. The habit had black boots and gilded spurs and was worn with the same black top hat with a plume of white ostrich and black egret feathers as the Great Habit, but a pale gold satin hat band.
- The collar of the Order was worn over the doublets of both habits.
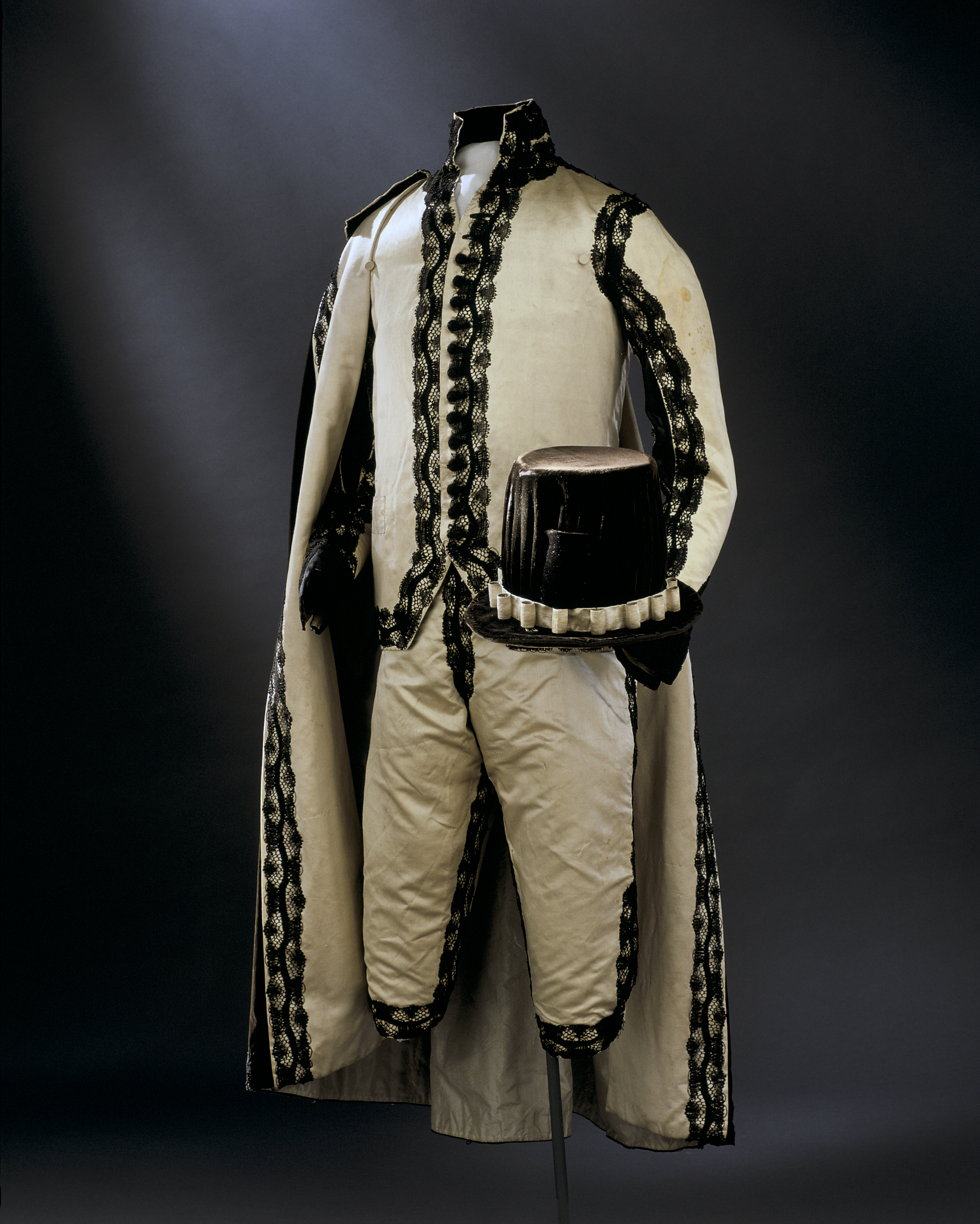
Greater Habit of Prince Fredrik Adolf

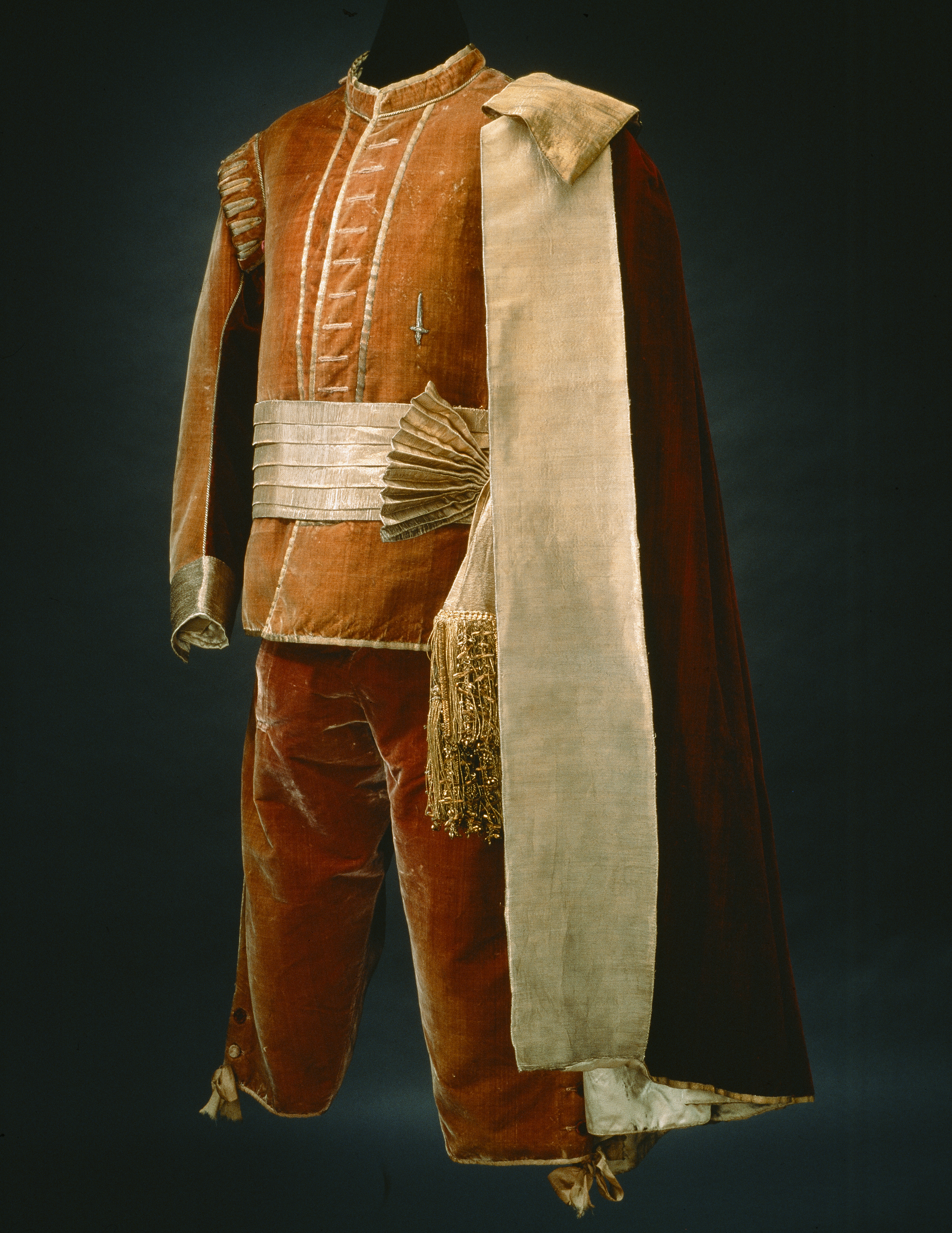
Lesser Habit of King Gustav III

== Former investiture ceremony ==
The nomination of new members took place once a year in the Seraphim Chamber of the Stockholm Palace, usually on the Monday after the first Sunday of Advent, to remind the Knights that faith was due to the King of Zion.

The actual reception into the Order, however, was fixed at 28 April, the birthday of King Frederick I, the founder of the Order. In the interval between the nomination and the reception, the newly elected member could only wear the star, but not the cross with the ribbon.

The reception of new knights into the Order took place at Stockholm in the Riddarholmen Church or in the royal chapel in the Stockholm Palace, in the presence of all the Knights and functionaries of the Order, as also of the Commanders of all the other orders.

The ceremonies were as follows:

The king was seated under a canopy to the right of the altar and the Knights assembled occupied benches to the right and the left, while the newly elected Knight was placed before the altar between two senior Knights, who acted, as it were, as sponsors. After the hymn, "Come, Holy Spirit", was chanted, the chief preacher of the Court briefly addressed those assembled on the duties of the subjects towards God, the King and the country. The Chancellor, who stood to the left of the sovereign, then explained in a few words the object of the order, the honour attached to it, and the reasons which had induced His Majesty to elect the new Knight. The two sponsors, thereupon, conduct the postulant before the King, where he kneels down, and replies affirmatively, with a simple "Yes," to all the following questions:

Did he promise before God and the King:

1. To honour, defend and preserve the laws and statutes of the Order?
2. To be ready to shed his blood for the Evangelical Lutheran religion and for the welfare of the country?
3. To assist, by his courage, to sustain the ancient glory of the Swedish Name?
4. To contribute, to the best of his power, to a life of peace and union amongst the Knights of the Order?
5. To watch over the honours and privileges now granted to him?
6. To do good to the poor and to protect widows and orphans?

On these questions being answered, the King handed the diploma to the Secretary from whom the Chancellor received the document and read it aloud to the assembly, after which the new Knight swore to defend with his life and property the Christian faith, to remain true to the King and the State, to protect the poor, widows and orphans, and to promote their welfare to the best of his power. The King then took from the Treasurer the chain of the Order, hung it round the neck of the new knight and, dubbed him with the coronation sword, saying:

"We, N., King of the Swedes, the Goths and the Wends, receive thee as our brave and honourable Swedish and Gothic Knight of our Order of the Seraphim. Be worthy of it," and embracing him amid the sound of drums and trumpets, he concluded with the words: "May the Lord protect thee!" The new Knight, then thanked His Majesty, kissed his hand, and embraced all his new colleagues, whereupon each of them repeated the words: "May the Lord protect thee!" With this the ceremony concluded.

The practice of dubbing ceased in 1902.

== Coats of arms ==
Serafimerringningen 11 February 2015 for Richard von Weizsäcker.

Each new knight or member has their coat of arms, surrounded with the collar or sash of the order, painted on a copper plate. A selection of these plates is exhibited in Seraphim room at the Royal Palace in Stockholm. When a knight of the Order dies, his coat of arms is hung in the former royal burial church Riddarholmskyrkan in Stockholm, and when the funeral takes place the church bells are rung constantly from 12:00 to 13:00, a practice known as the Serafimerringningen.

== Gallery ==
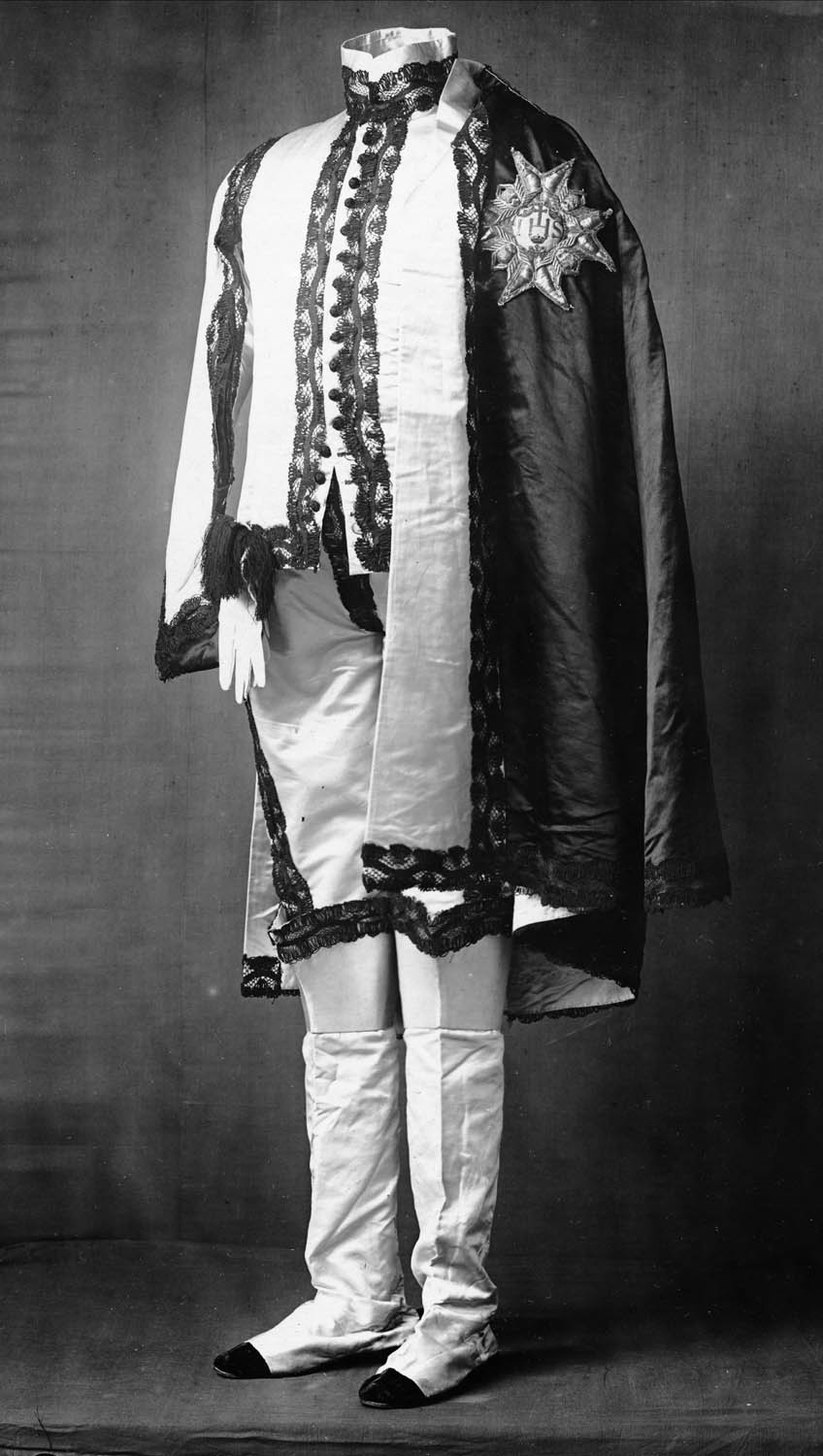
Greater Habit worn by Count Carl Axel Trolle Wachtmeister.

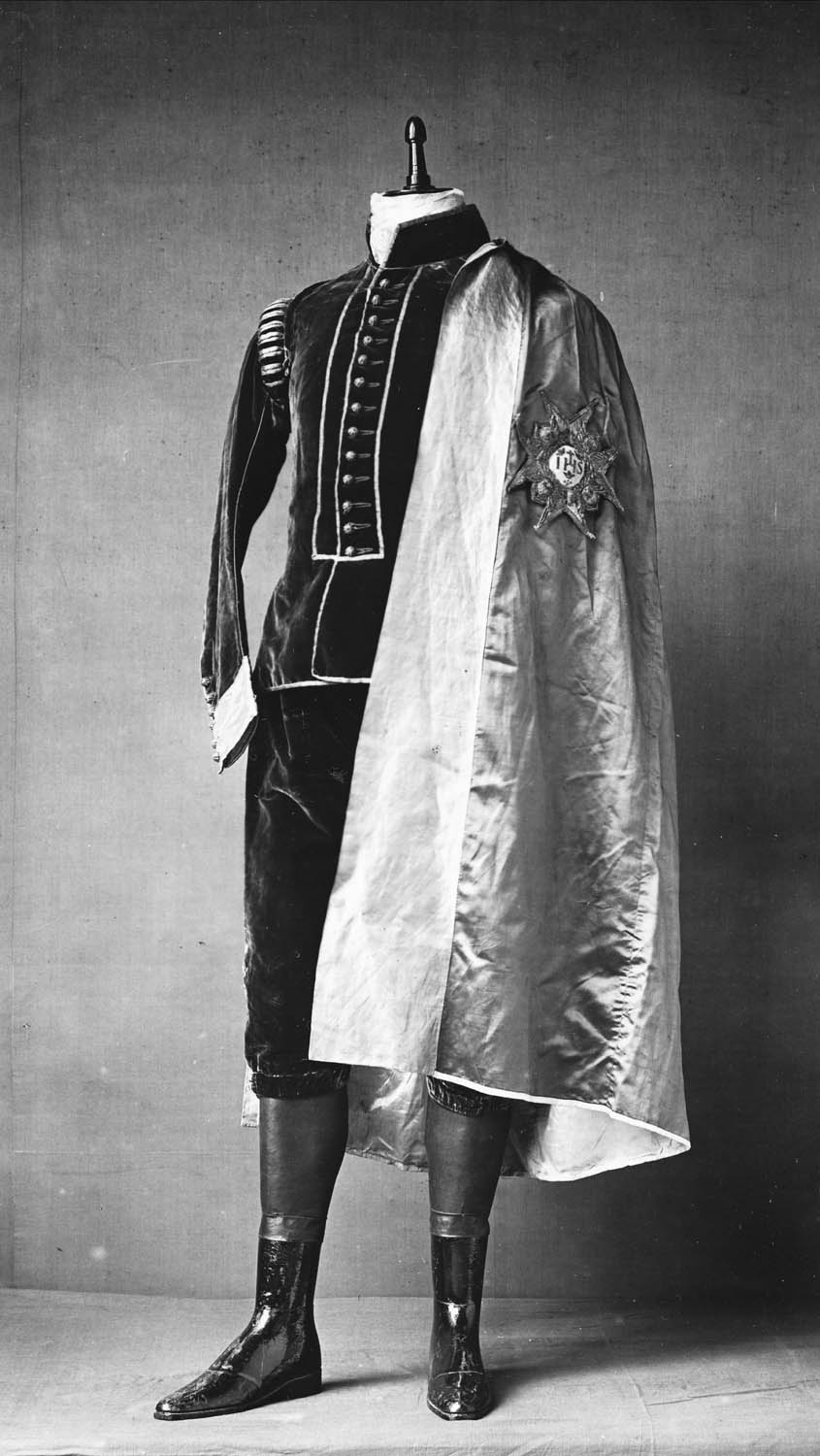
Lesser Habit worn by Count Carl Axel Trolle Wachtmeister.

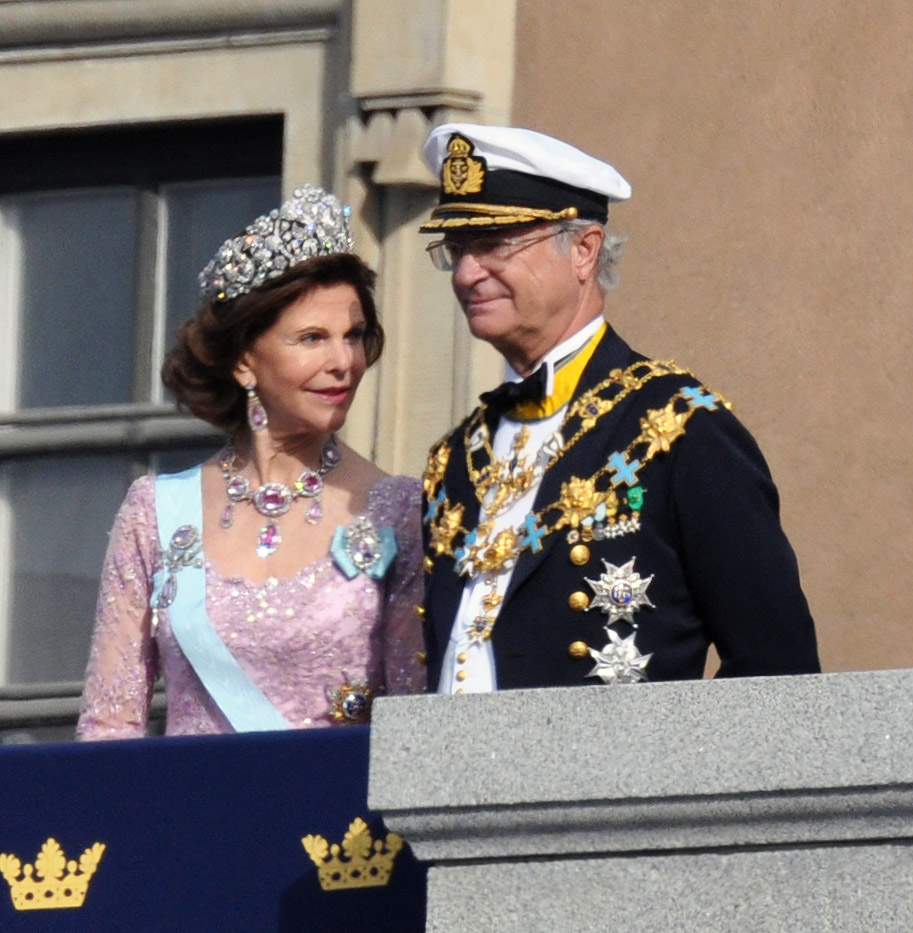
King Carl XVI Gustaf with his Collar.

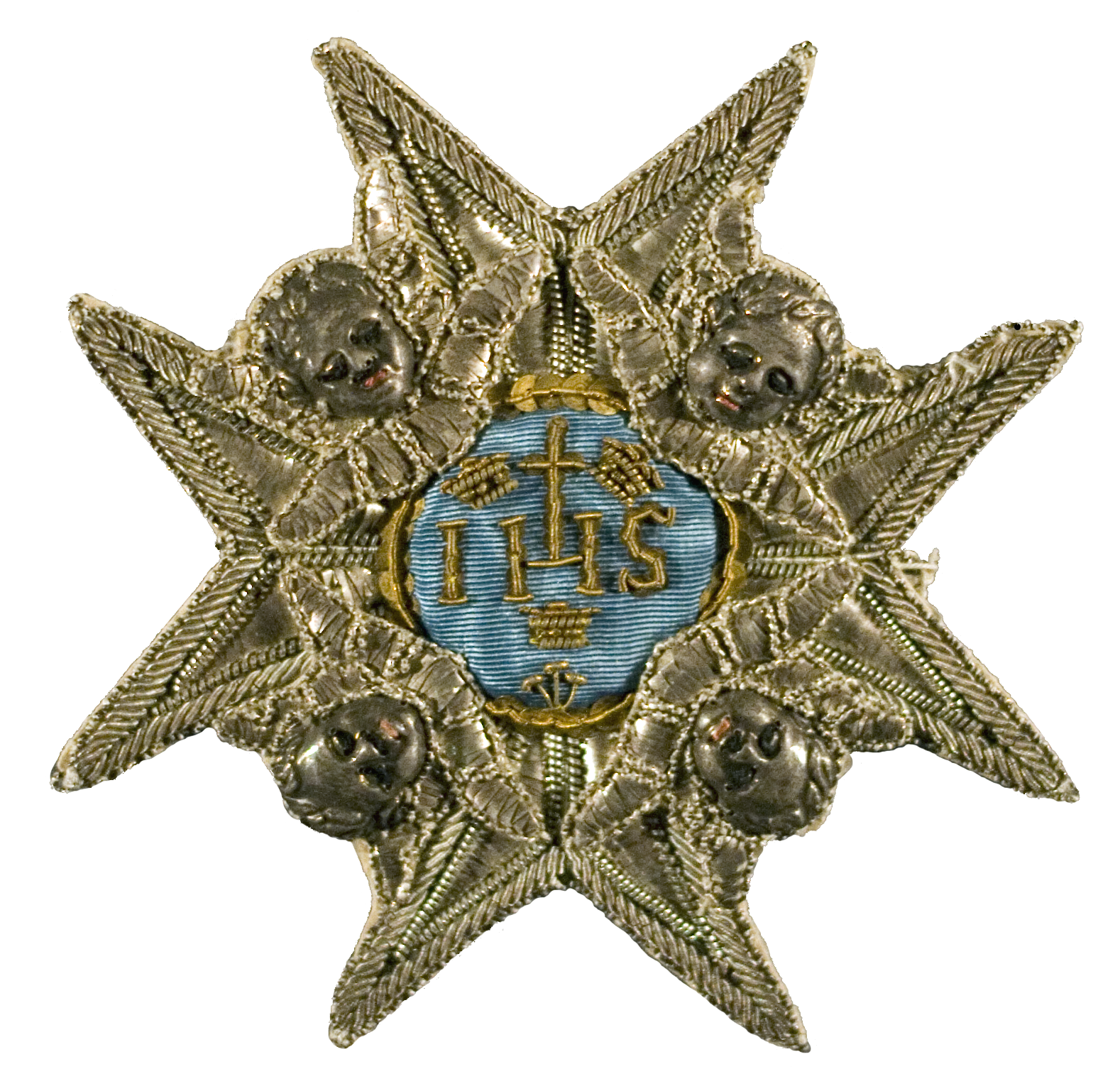
Early model of the star of the order.

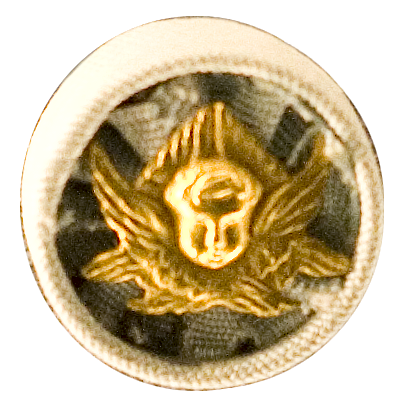
Rosette of the order. Earlier specimen, reintroduced of late.

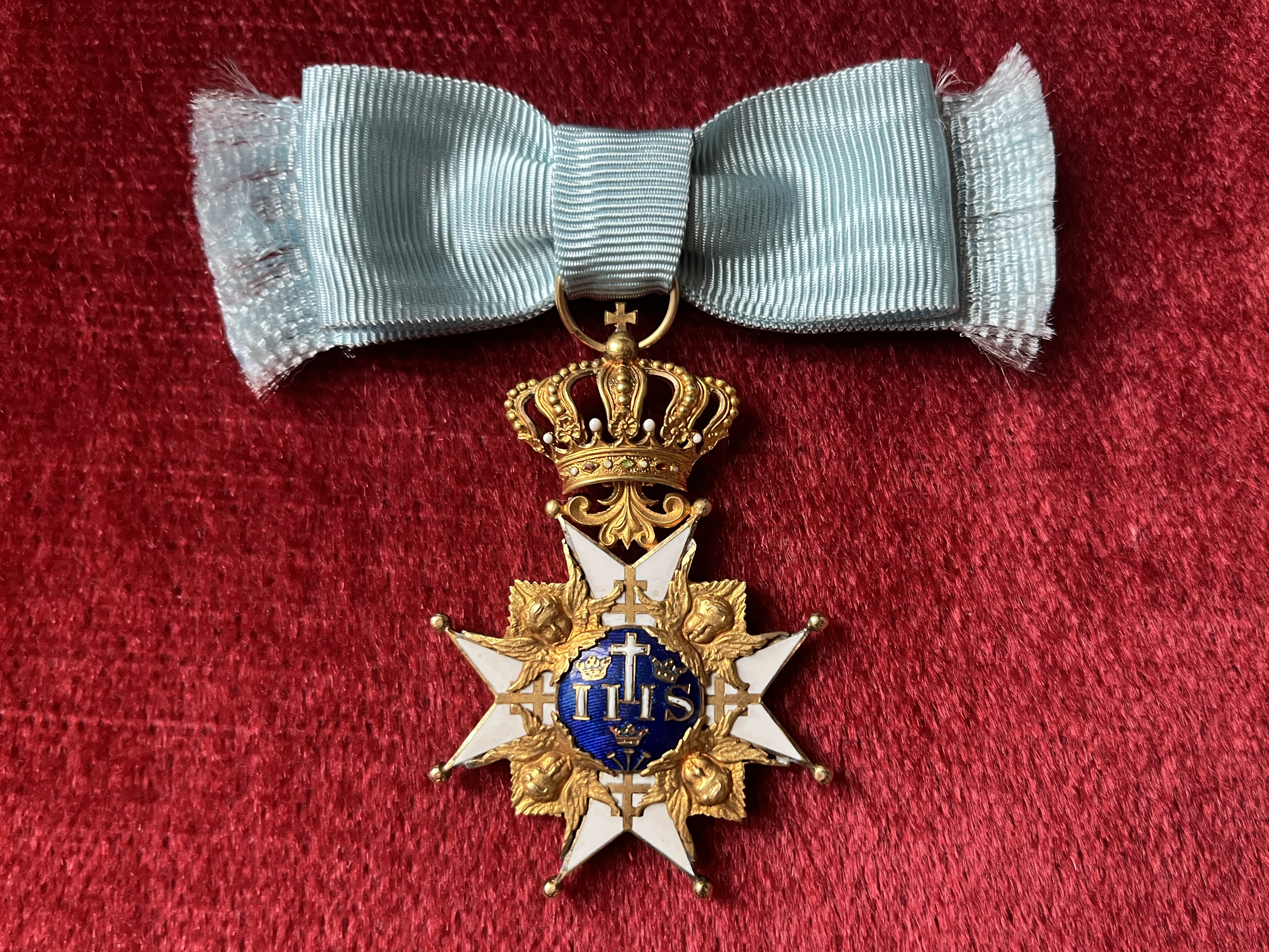
Badge of Office for female officer the Swedish Royal Orders of Knighthood

Collar of the order. As used in heraldry.

== See also ==
- List of knights of the Order of the Seraphim (the whole historical list)
- List of current knights of the Order of the Seraphim (currently living ones)
- Orders, decorations, and medals of Sweden
