= Norsta Runestone =

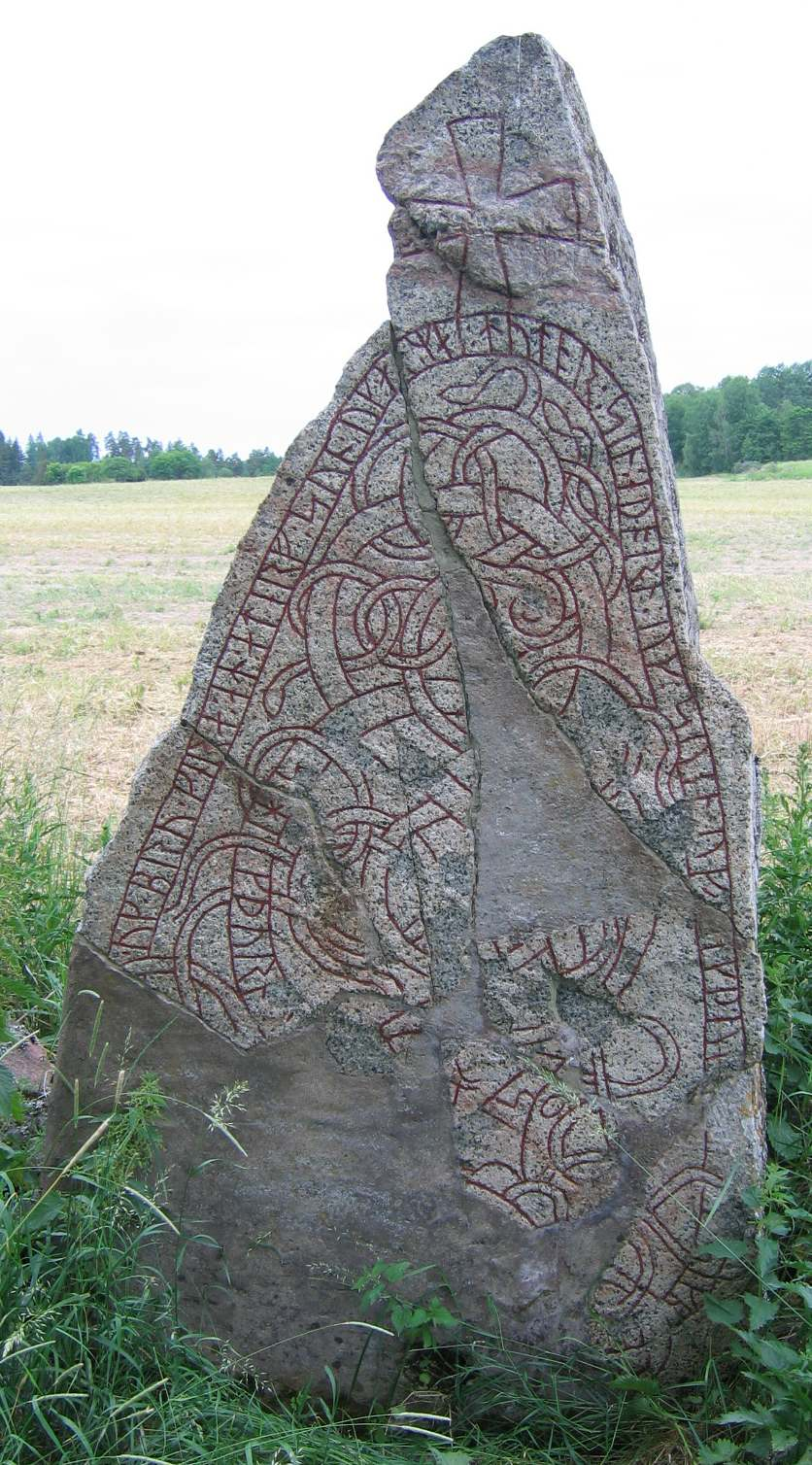
- Created: 11th century
- Discovered: Norsta, Uppland, Uppland, Sweden
- Rundata ID: U 861

Text – Native
- Old Norse : See article

Translation
- See article

The Norsta runestone is an 11th-century runestone inscribed in Old Norse with the Younger Futhark that stands near Wik Castle outside Uppsala, Sweden. It is notable because of the mention of two people named "maiden" and Sweyn. The form møy which appears on this runestone is the accusative form of Old East Norse māʀ which meant "maiden" and this is the only attestation of this word as the name of a girl, in Old Norse, besides a mention in the Hervarar saga, where a Mær ("maiden" in Old West Norse) married the Swedish king Inge I. Her brother was Blot-Sweyn, who succeeded Inge. As the runestone is from about the same time as Blot-Sweyn, it is likely that the Sweyn mentioned in the runestone is the same as the Swedish king Blot-Sweyn.

== Inscription ==
sihikþurn ' ... [risa * stin] ' uk ' bru ' kera : at : aterf : sun : uk ' a(t) ' mai : tutor : sin : eþorn : uk : suen : uk ' (u)ikþu-... ' sikb--... ...(ʀ) ' isi
Sigþorn {} ... ræisa {} stæin {} ok {} bro {} gærva {} at {} Adiarf, {} sun, {} ok {} at {} Møy, {} dottur {} sina, {} Æiþorn {} ok {} Svæinn {} ok {} Vigþo[rn] {} ... ... {} <isi>
Sigþorn ... the stone raised and the bridge made in memory of Ádjarfr, (his) son, and in memory of Mey, his daughter; Eiþorn and Sveinn and Vígþorn ..

== See also ==
- List of runestones

== Sources ==
- Sveriges runinskrifter (1922) by Erik Brate
- Rundata
