= Order of Jehova =

Order of Sweden

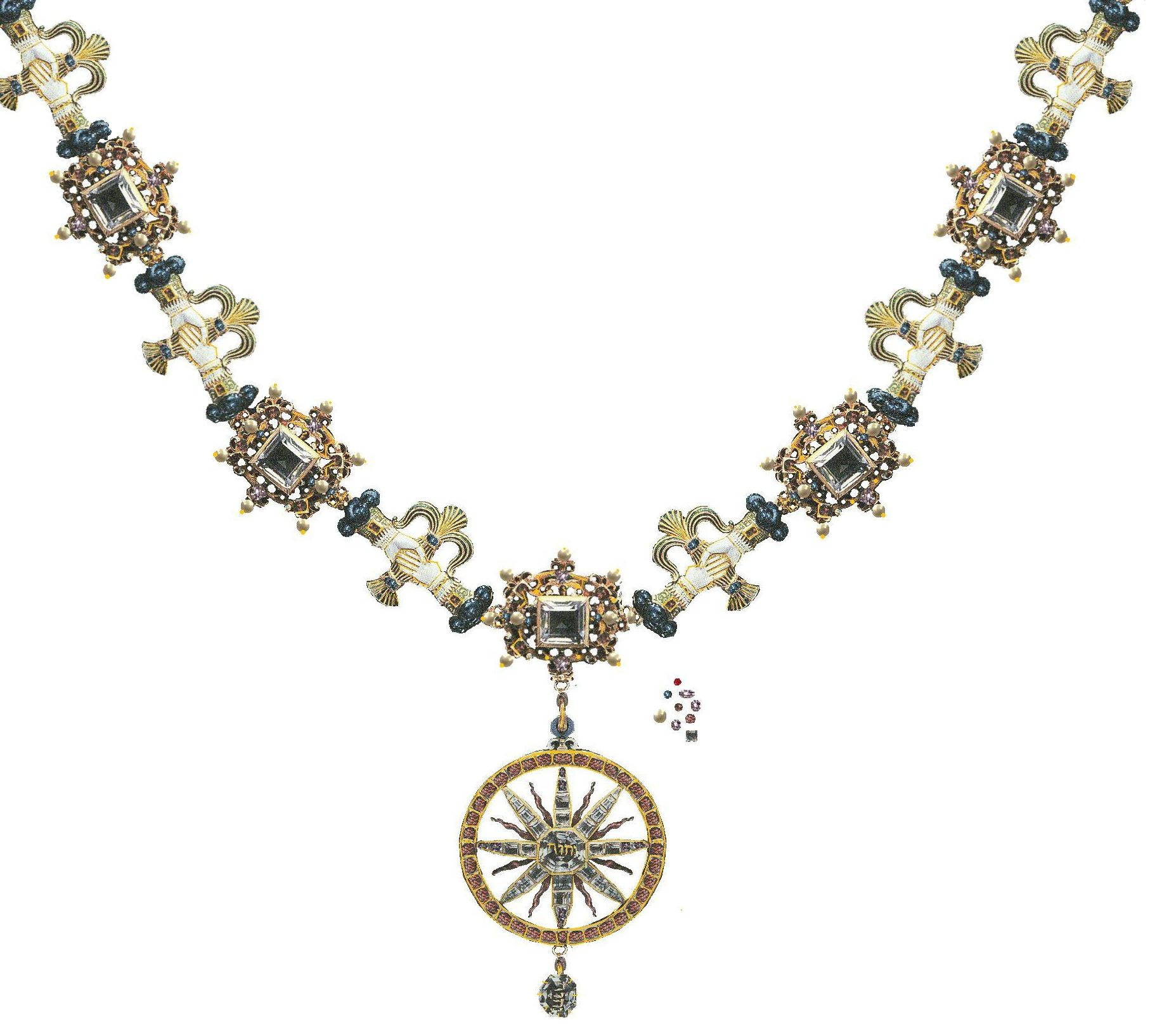
- The collar of the order.

Awarded by Charles IX of Sweden
- Type: Chivalric order in one class
- Established: 1606
- Motto: Iehovah solatium meum
- Status: Disestablished
- Grades: Commander Grand Cross; Commander; Knight

The Order of Jehova (Swedish: Jehovaorden) was a Swedish dynastic order of knighthood instituted in 1606 by King Charles IX of Sweden. The collar of the order was worn by the king alone, as head, although a report indicates that three Swedish princes wore a collar at the coronation of King Charles IX on 15 March 1606.

The kings motto was "Iehovah solatium meum" (Swedish: Gud är min tröst; English: God is my comfort).

== Literature ==
- Karl Löfström: Sverges riddarordnar (Stockholm 1948)
- Arvid Berghman: Nordiska riddareordnar och dekorationer (Malmö 1949)
- Rudolf Cederström: Katalog (Stockholm 1948)
- Rudolf Cederström: Svenskt Silversmide 1520 - 1850 (Stockholm 1941)
- Michael Conforti en Guy Walton: Royal treasures of Sweden 1500 - 1700 (Washington 1988)
