= List of princes of Sweden =

This is a list of Swedish princes from the adoption of Jean-Baptiste Jules Bernadotte, and through the Houses of Bernadotte.

An individual holding the title of "Prince of Sweden" would usually also be styled His Royal Highness. Additionally, on 7 October 2019, Carl XVI Gustaf issued a decree limiting the style of Royal Highness to his children and his heir's heirs, though allowing his grandsons who lost the style through this decree to retain their titles, duchies and place in the line of succession.

== List of Swedish princes by birth; House of Bernadotte ==
Portrait	Name	Arms	Born	Died	Royal lineage	Notes
	Joseph François Oscar		1799	1859	Only son of Charles XIV John and Désirée Clary	Prince of Sweden in 1818; Crown Prince (1818–1824); Duke of Södermanland (1818–1824); King (1844–1859)
	Carl Ludvig Eugen		1826	1872	Eldest son of Oscar I and Josephine of Leuchtenberg	Duke of Scania (1826–1859); Crown Prince (1844–1859); King (1859–1872)
	Frans Gustaf Oscar		1827	1852	Seconed son of Oscar I and Josephine of Leuchtenberg	Duke of Uppland
	Oscar Fredrik		1829	1907	Third son of Oscar I and Josephine of Leuchtenberg	Duke of Östergötland (1829–1872); King (1872–1907)
	Nikolaus August		1831	1872	Fourth son of Oscar I and Josephine of Leuchtenberg	Duke of Dalarna
	Carl Oscar Vilhelm Frederik		1852	1854	Son of Charles XV and Louise of the Netherlands	Duke of Södermanland
	Oscar Gustaf Adolf		1858	1907	First son of Oscar II and Sophia of Nassau	Duke of Värmland (1858–1907); Crown Prince (1872–1907); King (1907–1950)
	Oscar Carl August		1859	1953	Second son of Oscar II and Sophia of Nassau	Duke of Gotland (1859–1888 ); Renounced Titles on Maridge cr.; Prince Bernadotte (1892–1953); Count of Wisborg (1892–1953)
	Carl		1861	1951	Third son of Oscar II and Sophia of Nassau	Duke of Västergötland
	Eugen Napoleon Nicolaus		1865	1947	Fourth son of Oscar II and Sophia of Nassau	Duke of Närke
	Oscar Fredrik Wilhelm Olaf Gustaf Adolf		1882	1973	First son of Gustaf V and Victoria of Baden	Duke of Skåne (1882-1905); Crown Prince (1907–1950); King (1950–1973)
	Carl Wilhelm Ludvig		1884	1965	Second son of Gustaf V and Victoria of Baden	Duke of Södermanland
	Erik Gustav Ludvig Albert		1889	1918	Third son of Gustaf V and Victoria of Baden	Duke of Västmanland
	Carl Gustaf Oscar Fredrik Christian		1911	2003	Son of Prince Carl, Duke of Västergötland and Princess Ingeborg of Denmark	Duke of Östergötland (1911–1937); Renounced Titles on Maridge cr.; Prince Bernadotte (1937–2003)
	Gustaf Adolf Oscar Fredrik Arthur Edmund		1906	1947	First son of Gustaf VI Adolf and Princess Margaret of Connaught	Duke of Västerbotten
	Sigvard Oscar Fredrik		1907	2002	Second son of Gustaf VI Adolf and Princess Margaret of Connaught	Duke of Uppland (1907–1934); Renounced Titles on Maridge cr.; Prince Bernadotte (1934–2002); Count of Wisborg (1951–2002)
	Bertil Gustaf Oskar Carl Eugén		1912	1997	Third son of Gustaf VI Adolf and Princess Margaret of Connaught	Duke of Halland
	Carl Johan Arthur		1916	2012	Fourth son of Gustaf VI Adolf and Princess Margaret of Connaught	Duke of Dalarna (1916–1946); Renounced Titles on Maridge cr.; Prince Bernadotte (1946–2012); Count of Wisborg (1951–2012)
	Lennart		1909	2004	Son of Prince Wilhelm, Duke of Södermanland and Grand Duchess Maria Pavlovna of Russia	Duke of Småland (1909–1932); Renounced Titles on Maridge cr.; Prince Bernadotte (1932–2004); Count of Wisborg (1951–2004)
	Carl Gustaf Folke Hubertus		1973		Son of Prince Gustaf Adolf, Duke of Västerbotten and Princess Sibylla of Saxe-Coburg and Gotha	Duke of Jämtland (1946–1973); Crown Prince (1950–1973); King (1973-present)
	Carl Philip Edmund Bertil		1979		Son of Carl XVI Gustaf and Silvia Sommerlath	Crown Prince (1979–1980); Duke of Värmland
	Olof Daniel Westling		1973		Husband of Victoria, Crown Princess of Sweden	Mr. Olof Daniel Westling (1973–2010); Cr. on Mardige in 2010; Prince of Sweden; Duke of Jämtland
	Oscar Carl Olof		2016		Son of Victoria, Crown Princess of Sweden and Daniel Westling	Duke of Skåne
	Nicolas Paul Gustaf		2015		Son of Princess Madeleine, Duchess of Hälsingland and Gästrikland and Christopher O'Neill	Duke of Ångermanland; Lost style of Royal Highness by decree on 7 October 2019
	Alexander Erik Hubertus Bertil		2016		First son of Prince Carl Philip, Duke of Värmland and Sofia Hellqvist	Duke of Södermanland; Lost style of Royal Highness by decree on 7 October 2019
	Gabriel Carl Walther		2017		Second son of Prince Carl Philip, Duke of Värmland and Sofia Hellqvist	Duke of Dalarna; Lost style of Royal Highness by decree on 7 October 2019
	Julian Herbert Folke		2021		Third son of Prince Carl Philip, Duke of Värmland and Sofia Hellqvist	Duke of Halland; Not given style of Royal Highness due to royal decree from 7 October 2019
