= Swedish royal family =

Family of the Swedish monarch

The Swedish royal family since 1818 has consisted of members of the Swedish Royal House of Bernadotte (Swedish: Kungahuset), closely related to the King of Sweden. Today those members who are recognized by the king are entitled to royal titles and styles (manner of address), and perform official engagements and ceremonial duties of state. The extended family of the King (Swedish: Kungafamiljen) consists of other close relatives who are not royal and thus do not represent the country officially.

== History ==
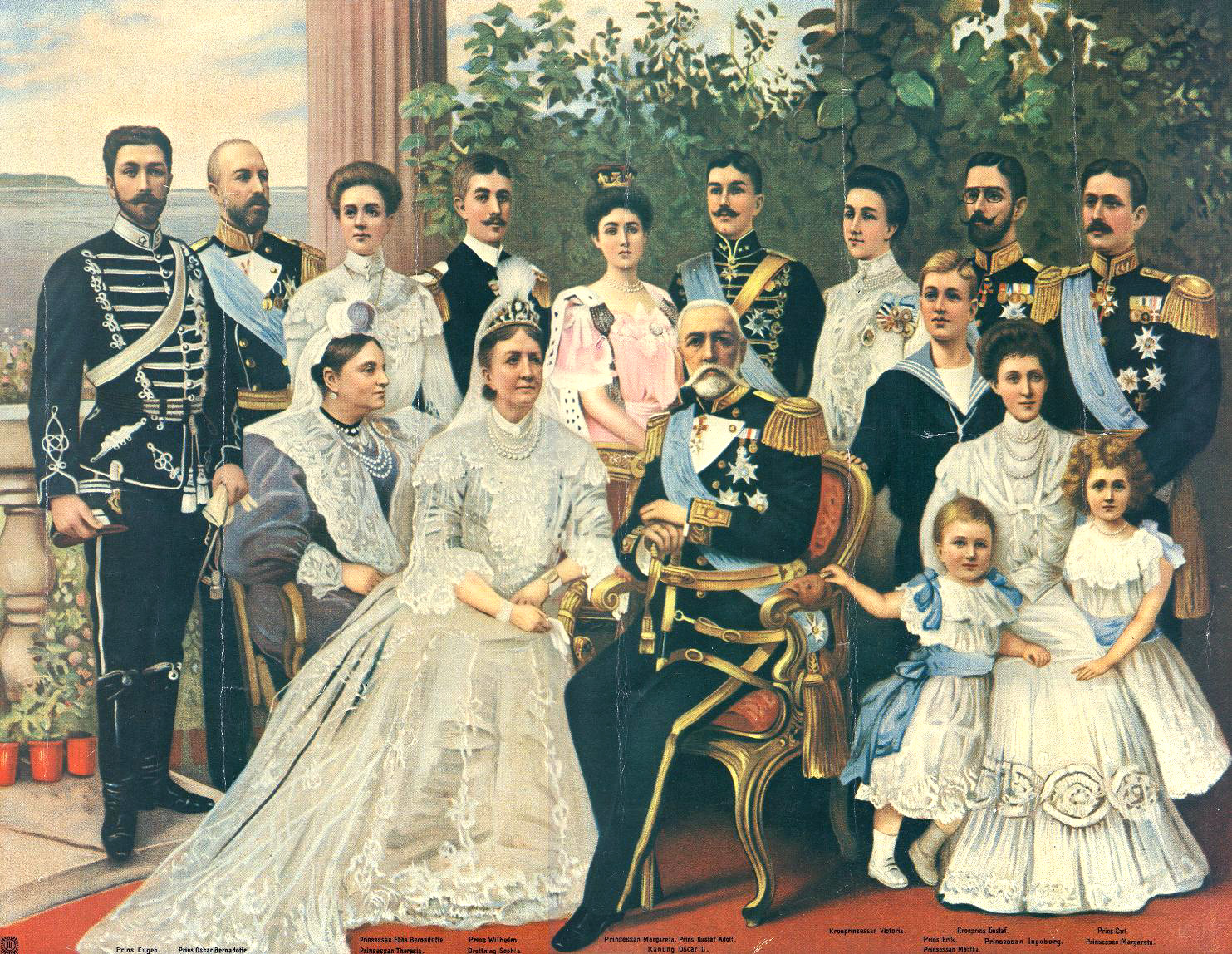
The Swedish Royal Family (including extended family members) in 1905.

A Swedish royal family, as closely related to a head of state, has been able to be identified as existent from as early as the 10th century A.D., with more precise detail added during the two or three centuries that followed. An exceptional case is that of Saint Bridget (1303–1373) who outside of Sweden became known as the Princess of Nericia, a title which appears to have been a noble, rather than a royal one, since she was not the daughter of a king. Historically confirmed monarchs are listed officially by the Swedish Royal Court.

Until the 1620s Swedish provinces were granted as territorial appanages to royal princes which, as dukes thereof, they governed semi-autonomously. Beginning during the reign of Gustav III, and as codified in § 34 of the 1772 Instrument of Government, provincial dukedoms have existed in the royal family as nominal non-hereditary titles only, without any inherent property ownership or trust attached to them; although several members of the royal family have maintained a special public connection to, and sometimes a secondary residence in, "his or her duchy".

The son of a Swedish king has usually held the princely title as a royal dynast (such as Prince Bertil, Duke of Halland), but on a rare occasion also as a rank of nobility (such as Fursten Prince Frederick William of Hessenstein), or as a courtesy title for an ex-dynast (such as Prins Oscar Bernadotte).

== Members ==
=== Royal House ===
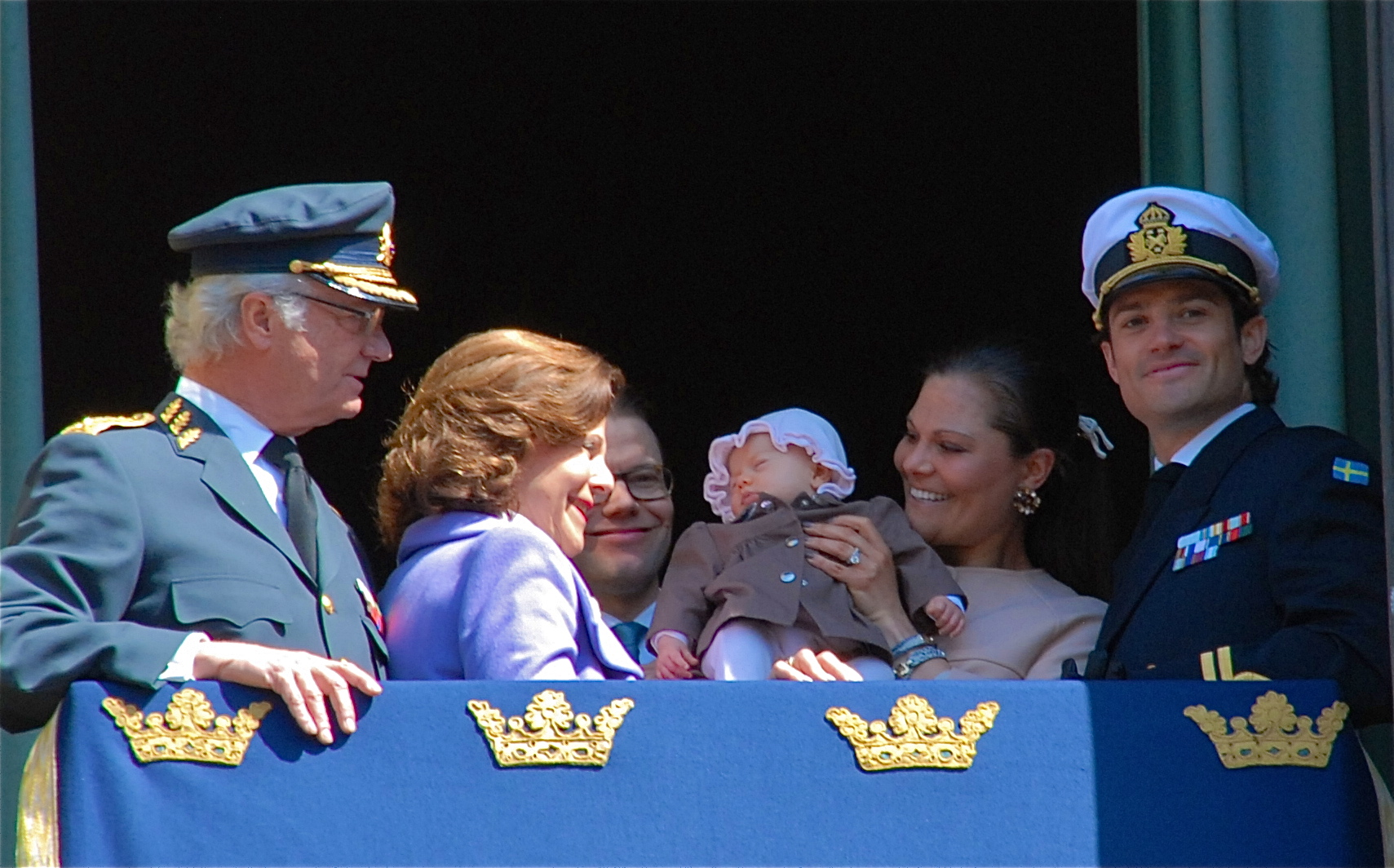
Some of the governmentally recognized (royal) members of the Swedish Royal Family in 2012.

The Swedish Royal Court lists the following persons as members of the Royal House (Kungl. Huset):

- King Carl XVI Gustaf (born 1946)
- Queen Silvia (the King's wife, born 1943)
  - Crown Princess Victoria, Duchess of Västergötland (the King's elder daughter, born 1977)
  - Prince Daniel, Duke of Västergötland (the King's son-in-law, born 1973, husband of Crown Princess Victoria)
    - Princess Estelle, Duchess of Östergötland (the King's granddaughter, born 2012, daughter of Crown Princess Victoria)
    - Prince Oscar, Duke of Skåne, (the King's grandson, born 2016, son of Crown Princess Victoria)
  - Prince Carl Philip, Duke of Värmland (the King's only son, born 1979)
  - Princess Sofia, Duchess of Värmland (the King's daughter-in-law, born 1984, wife of Prince Carl Philip)
  - Princess Madeleine, Duchess of Hälsingland and Gästrikland (the King's younger daughter, born 1982),
    married to Christopher O'Neill (born 1974, he declined a royal title and is not a member of the Royal House)

=== Royal Family ===
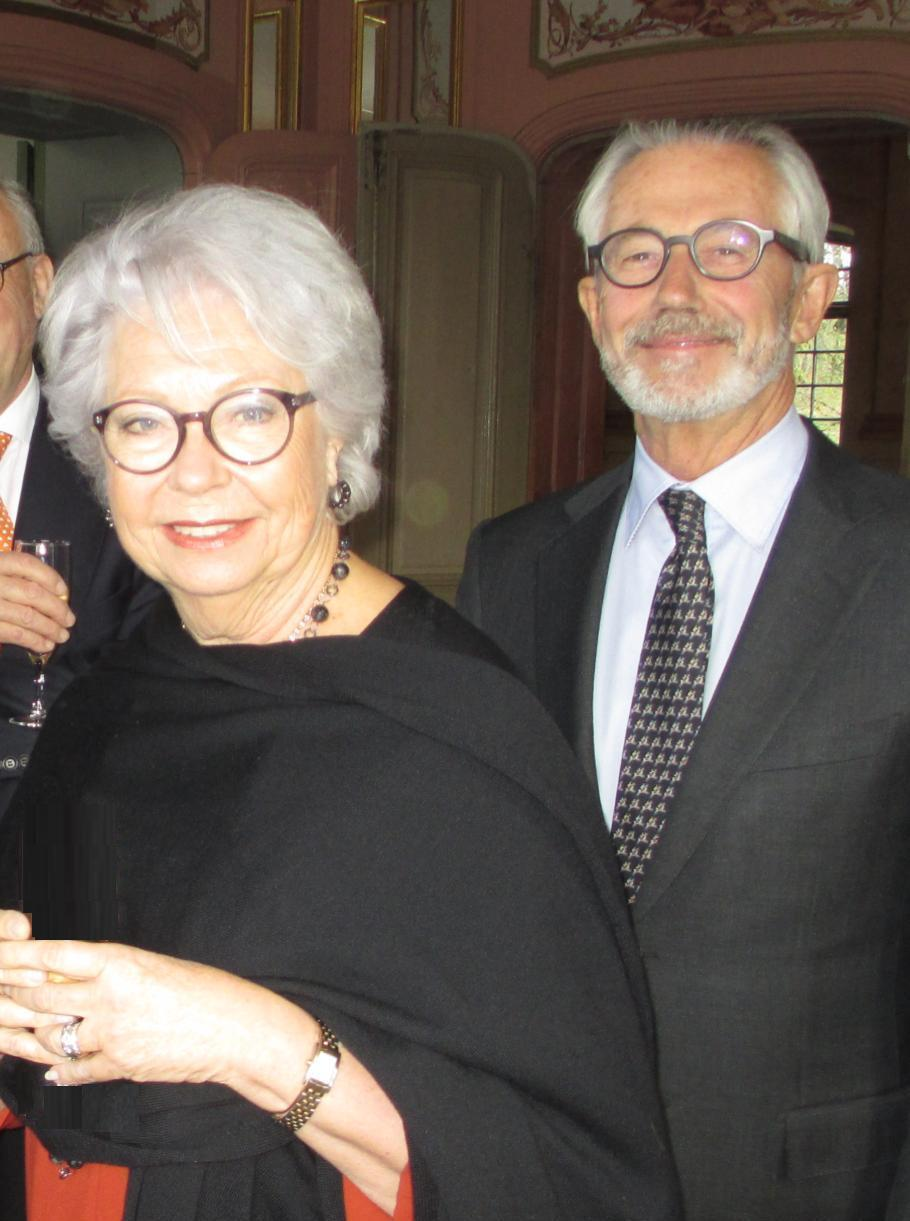
Princess Christina, Mrs. Magnuson (pictured with her husband)

The Royal Court lists the following persons additionally as members of the Royal Family (Kungl. Familjen):

- Prince Alexander, Duke of Södermanland (the King's grandson, born 2016, son of Prince Carl Philip)
- Prince Gabriel, Duke of Dalarna (the King's grandson, born 2017, son of Prince Carl Philip)
- Prince Julian, Duke of Halland (the King's grandson, born 2021, son of Prince Carl Philip)
- Princess Ines, Duchess of Västerbotten (the King's granddaughter, born 2025, daughter of Prince Carl Philip)
- Princess Leonore, Duchess of Gotland (the King's granddaughter, born 2014, daughter of Princess Madeleine)
- Prince Nicolas, Duke of Ångermanland (the King's grandson, born 2015, son of Princess Madeleine)
- Princess Adrienne, Duchess of Blekinge (the King's granddaughter, born 2018, daughter of Princess Madeleine)
- Princess Margaretha, Mrs. Ambler (the King's first sister, born 1934), widow of John Ambler (1924–2008)
- Princess Christina, Mrs. Magnuson (the King's fourth sister, born 1943), married to Consul General Tord Magnuson (born 1941)

=== Relationships of current members ===
- Red-framed persons are deceased.

King Gustaf VI Adolf	Crown Princess Margareta
Prince Gustaf Adolf	Princess Sibylla
Princess Margaretha**	Princess Birgitta	Princess Désirée	Princess Christina**	The King*	The Queen*
Prince Daniel*	The Crown Princess*	Prince Carl Philip*	Princess Sofia*	Christopher O'Neill	Princess Madeleine*
Princess Estelle*	Prince Oscar*	Prince Alexander**	Prince Gabriel**	Prince Julian**	Princess Ines**	Princess Leonore**	Prince Nicolas**	Princess Adrienne**

Notes

* Member of the Royal House (Kungl. Huset)

** Member of the Royal Family (Kungl. Familjen)

== See also ==
- Monarchy of Sweden
- Succession to the Swedish throne
- Duchies in Sweden
- List of longest-living members of the Swedish royal family
