= Armorial of the House of Bernadotte =

Armorial of the House of Bernadotte is a list of coats of arms only of past kings and currently living members of the royal family of Sweden. Deceased princes and princesses are not included.

== Royal House of Bernadotte ==
Figure	Name of Prince and Blazon
	Charles XIV John of Sweden (1763-1844), Sovereign Prince of Ponte-Corvo, 1806–1810, Crown Prince of Sweden 1810-1818, Crown Prince of Norway 1814-1818. King of Sweden and Norway 1818-1844. Arms as Sovereign Prince of Ponte-Corvo 1806-1810. Arms as Crown Prince of Sweden 1810-1814 Arms as Crown Prince of Sweden and Norway 1814-1818. Arms as King of Sweden and Norway 1818-1844.
	Oscar I of Sweden (1799-1859), Duke of Södermanland 1810-1844, Crown Prince of Sweden and Norway 1818-1844. King of Sweden and Norway 1844-1859. Son of Charles XIV John. Arms as Duke of Södermanland 1810-1818 Arms as Crown Prince of Sweden and Norway and Duke of Södermanland 1818-1826 Arms as Crown Prince of Sweden and Norway and Duke of Södermanland 1826-1844 Arms as King of Sweden and Norway 1844-1859
	Charles XV of Sweden (1826-1872), Duke of Scania 1826-1859. Crown Prince of Sweden and Norway 1844-1859. King of Sweden and Norway 1859-1872. Eldest son of Oscar I. Arms as Duke of Scania 1826-1844 Arms as Crown Prince of Sweden and Norway and Duke of Scania 1844-1859 Arms as King of Sweden and Norway, 1859-1872.
	Oscar II of Sweden (1829-1907), Duke of Östergötland 1829-1872. King of Sweden 1872-1907. King of Norway 1872-1905. Second son of Oscar I and brother of Charles XV. Arms as Duke of Östergötland 1829-1844. Arms as Duke of Östergötland 1844-1872 Arms as King of Sweden and Norway, 1872-1905. Arms as King of Sweden, 1905-1907.
	Gustaf V of Sweden (1858-1950), Duke of Värmland 1858-1950. King of Sweden 1950-1973. Eldest son of Oscar II. Arms as Duke of Värmland 1858-1872 Arms as Crown Prince of Sweden and Norway and Duke of Värmland 1872-1905 (missing here). Arms as Crown Prince of Sweden and Duke of Värmland 1905-1907 Arms as King of Sweden 1907-1950.
	Gustaf VI Adolf of Sweden (1882-1973), Duke of Skåne 1882-1950. King of Sweden 1950-1973. Eldest son of Gustav V. Arms as Duke of Skåne 1882-1905 Arms as Crown Prince of Sweden and Duke of Skåne 1907-1950 Arms as King of Sweden 1950-1973.
	Prince Gustaf Adolf, Duke of Västerbotten (born 1906, d.1947), Duke of Västerbotten 1906-1947. Eldest son of Gustav VI Adolf and father of Charles XVI Gustav. Died before he could accede to the throne. Arms as Duke of Västerbotten 1906-1947
	Carl XVI Gustaf of Sweden (born 1946), Duke of Jämtland 1947-1973. King of Sweden 1973–present. Only son of Prince Gustaf Adolf. Arms as Duke of Jämtland 1947-1973. Arms as King of Sweden 1973–present.
	Victoria, Crown Princess of Sweden (born 1977), Duchess of Västergötland 1977–present. Crown Princess of Sweden 1980–present. Eldest daughter and eldest child of Carl XVI Gustaf. Arms borne 1977–present.
	Prince Carl Philip, Duke of Värmland (born 1979), Duke of Värmland 1979–present. Crown Prince of Sweden 1979-1980. Only son of Carl XVI Gustaf. Arms borne 1979–present.
	Princess Madeleine, Duchess of Hälsingland and Gästrikland (born 1982), Duchess of Hälsingland and Gästrikland 1982–present. Second daughter of Carl XVI Gustaf. Arms borne 1982–present.
	Prince Daniel, Duke of Västergötland (born 1973), Duke of Västergötland 2011–present as of his marriage to the Crown Princess, when he also assumed the surname of Bernadotte. Arms as Duke of Västergötland 2011–present. Västergötland
	Princess Estelle, Duchess of Östergötland (born 2012), Duchess of Östergötland 2012–present. Daughter of Prince Daniel and Crown Princess Victoria and matrilineal granddaughter of Carl XVI Gustaf. Arms as Duchess of Östergötland 2012–present.
	Princess Leonore, Duchess of Gotland (born 2014), Duchess of Gotland 2014–present. Daughter of Princess Madeleine and Christopher O'Neill and matrilineal granddaughter of Carl XVI Gustaf. Arms as Duchess of Gotland 2014–present.
	Princess Birgitta of Sweden and Hohenzollern (1937-2024), second older sister of Carl XVI Gustaf. Arms as Princess of Sweden 1937-1961 Arms as Princess of Hohenzollern and Sweden 1961–present.
	Princess Marianne Bernadotte (1924-2025), widow of an uncle of Carl XVI Gustaf (member of royal family, not royal house). Arms as Princess Bernadotte in the nobility of Luxembourg
