= Prince Daniel, Duke of Västergötland =

Member of the Swedish royal family (born 1973)

Prince Daniel
- Duke of Västergötland
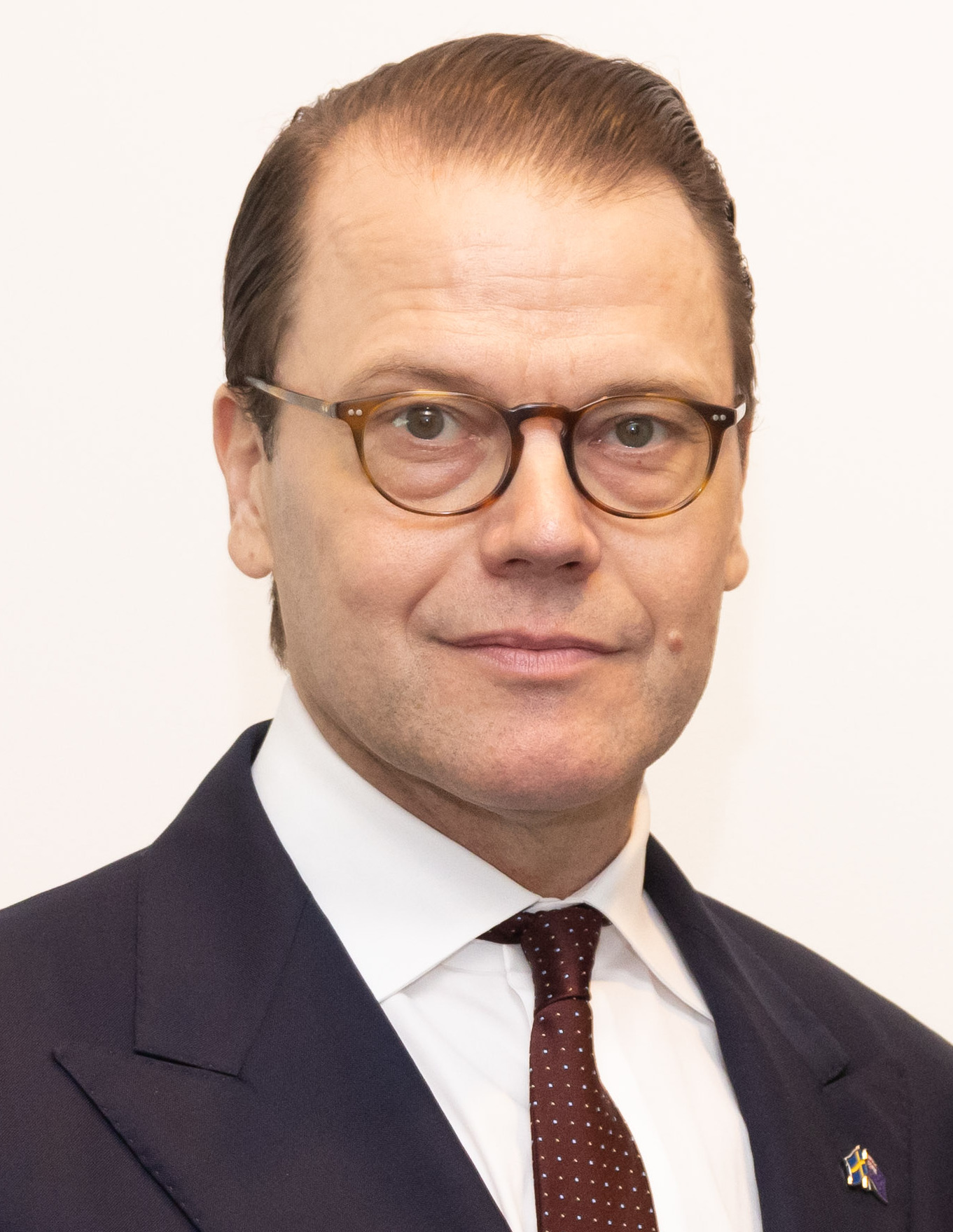
- Daniel in 2023
- Born: Olof Daniel Westling; 15 September 1973 (age 53); Örebro Hospital, Örebro, Sweden
- Spouse: Victoria, Crown Princess of Sweden (m. 2010)
- Issue: Princess Estelle, Duchess of Östergötland; Prince Oscar, Duke of Skåne
Names
- Olof Daniel Westling Bernadotte
- House: Bernadotte (by marriage)
- Father: Olle Westling
- Mother: Ewa Westring
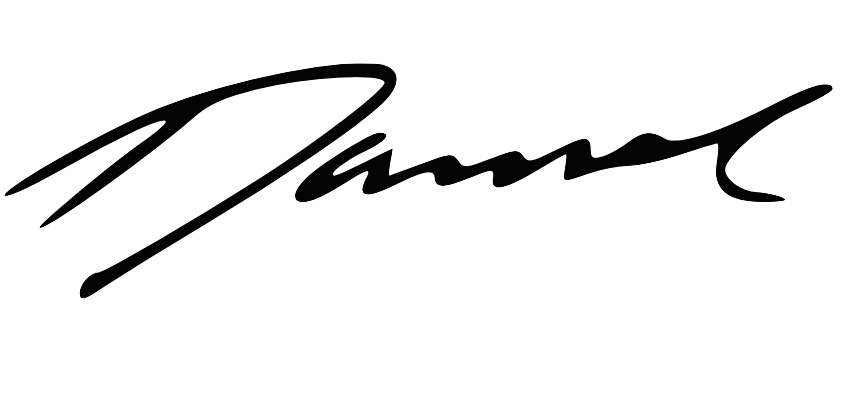
- Signature

Prince Daniel, Duke of Västergötland (Note: His full name, as registered with the Swedish Tax Authority's national census, is Olof Daniel Westling Bernadotte.) (born Olof Daniel Westling; born 15 September 1973) is a member of the Swedish royal family by marriage to Victoria, Crown Princess of Sweden, making him the presumptive consort of Sweden. Prior to his marriage to the heir apparent to the Swedish throne, he was a personal trainer and gym owner and ran a company called Balance Training with three gyms in central Stockholm.

== Early life and education ==
Olof Daniel Westling was born on 15 September 1973 to Olle Westling and Ewa (née Westring) at Örebro Hospital, the same day that Carl XVI Gustaf's reign began. His mother and father worked for the postal service and social services, respectively. Shortly after his birth, the family moved to a suburb of Falun, and then again in 1978 to Ockelbo. He has an older sister, Anna. Most of his ancestors were farmers in the province of Hälsingland. Daniel was christened at Almby Church in January 1974. His father has Forest Finnish ancestry.

He graduated from Perslundaskolan, and also played hockey at the junior and A-team level. After completing his education, he worked as a care assistant in a nursing home. He completed 15 months of military service as part of national conscription in the Swedish Army at Hälsinge Regiment in Gävle. He was honorably discharged as a second lieutenant. Daniel then worked at an after-school center for children with special needs for about a year.

== Career ==
In November 2009 it was reported that Westling was to step down as CEO and member of the Board of Directors of the Balance company, although he would continue to be an equity partner. It was expected that the same procedure would be followed with his involvements in other companies before he became prince. Since his marriage to the Crown Princess, he is now a working royal, assisting the Crown Princess in her capacity as heir to the Swedish throne, accompanying her on visits and royal affairs.

== Personal life ==
=== Relationship with Crown Princess Victoria ===
In 2001, Westling met Crown Princess Victoria when he became her personal trainer. In May 2002 Expressen reported that they were dating. As the relationship progressed, the press noted that he did not appear comfortable with public attention. In July 2002, Daniel and Victoria were pictured kissing for the first time at a party. On 1 July 2008, he moved into a one-bedroom rental apartment in the Pagebyggnaden building on the grounds of Drottningholm Palace. The move was confirmed by the Royal Court.

=== Marriage and children ===
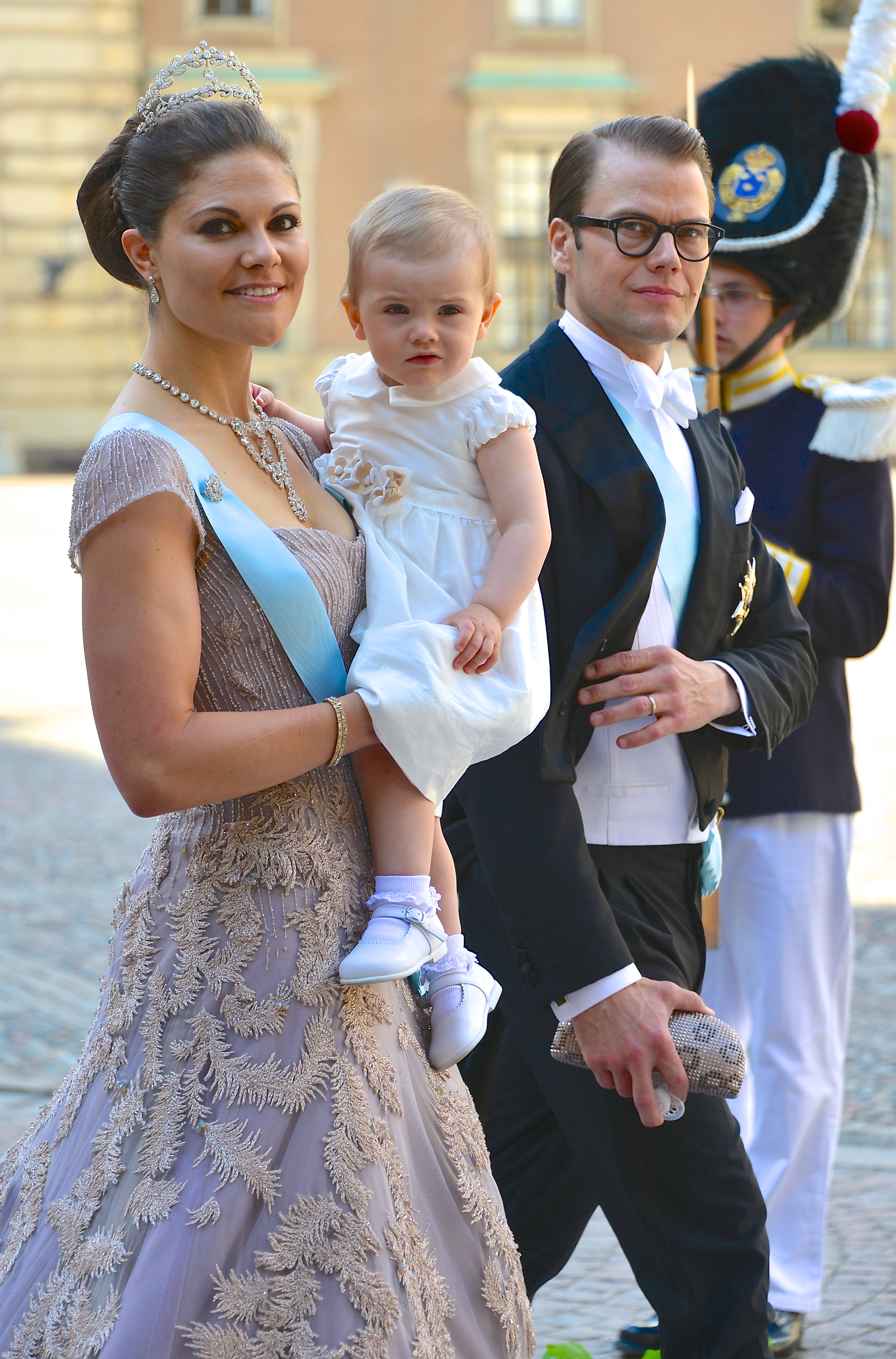
Daniel with his wife and daughter arriving at the wedding of his sister-in-law Madeleine, 2013.

On 24 February 2009, Daniel and Crown Princess Victoria received the required consent of King Carl XVI Gustaf and the Government of Sweden for marriage. Such permission is necessary according to Article 5 of the Swedish Act of Succession.

The wedding took place at the Stockholm Cathedral on 19 June 2010, the 34th anniversary of her parents' wedding. After the wedding, Daniel and Victoria moved into the Haga Palace in Stockholm, Sweden. On 26 September 2010, Daniel went on his first tour with Victoria, visiting France in connection with the Bernadotte anniversary.

On 17 August 2011, the Swedish royal court announced that Daniel and Victoria were expecting their first child in March 2012. She gave birth to a girl on 23 February 2012, Princess Estelle, Duchess of Östergötland. Daniel took his paternity leave and switched parental roles with Victoria when Estelle began preschool. Their second child, Prince Oscar, Duke of Skåne, was born on 2 March 2016.

=== Health ===
Daniel has a congenital, non-hereditary kidney disease, which was discovered in connection with an accident at age 16. The condition became more severe around 2008–2009, and he underwent dialysis while his parents were tested as potential donors. Three months after his engagement, on 29 May 2009, Westling underwent a kidney transplant at Karolinska University Hospital. His father was the donor and the operation was a success. Victoria could not be present during the operation as she was on a state visit to Greenland at the time. He has since discussed his experience with the press and advocated for organ donation.

== Charity work ==
=== Patronages ===
Daniel is a patron in the following organizations: A Swedish Classic, The Healthy Generation Foundation, International Society of Nephrology, More Organ Donation.

=== Sport ===
Daniel is a keen sportsman. He has attended the Ryder Cup and also plays golf himself; as of October 2023 had a handicap of 4.4. He also enjoys football and ice hockey, and supports AIK Fotboll and AIK Hockey, respectively.

Daniel invented Prince Daniel's Race and Sports Day, which are arranged each year to encourage more young people to get exercise and to take an interest in sport. The game is in association with the Swedish Sports Confederation.

Daniel and Victoria established a foundation to mark the occasion of their marriage in 2010. The focus of the foundation is to combat exclusion and promote good health among children and young people in Sweden. The couple established Generation Pep, a non-profit organisation that works to raise awareness of and encourage commitment to issues relating to the health of children and young people. It awards one school each year for promotion of physical activity in young people. Schools can also earn a certification for creating initiatives to increase movement and sport participation amongst its students. In association with the organization, Daniel has visited schools in Sweden and Finland.

In 2022, the Karolinska Institute conferred him with an honorary doctorate for his public health advocacy.

=== Health and medicine ===
He is an honorary chairman of the board of the Swedish Heart-Lung Foundation and has given his name to Prince Daniel's Grant for Promising Young Researchers.

=== Entrepreneurship ===
Each year, Daniel visits the Swedish Young Enterprise Championship. He is also a member of Young Enterprise's national board.

The Prince Daniel's Fellowship project and its entrepreneurial programme were launched in January 2013. Prince Daniel with business leaders and entrepreneurs visits upper secondary schools, universities and university colleges around Sweden to inspire young people to get involved in entrepreneurship. This project is a long-term partnership between Prince Daniel and the Royal Swedish Academy of Engineering Sciences.

== Titles, styles, honours and arms ==
=== Titles and styles ===
Sweden has practised absolute primogeniture only since 1980. This means that Victoria is the first female heir apparent, and questions arose as to how Daniel would be known after their marriage.

When Carl XVI Gustaf married Silvia Sommerlath in 1976, he discontinued the established norm that Swedish princes must marry royalty to be eligible to inherit the throne. But men, royal or not, had only twice before, in the 13th and 17th centuries, obtained new title or rank as the spouse of a Swedish princess, and even three queens regnant left no clear precedent. Margaret (reigned 1388–1412) was the widow of Haakon VI of Norway and Christina (reigned 1632–1654) was unmarried. The most recent Ulrika Eleonora (reigned 1718–1720) was already married during her tenure as queen regnant: her husband, Frederick of Hesse-Kassel, was given the style "Royal Highness" during his tenure as consort, a style granted to him by the estates. Ulrika Eleonora abdicated so her consort Frederick could be king. In Daniel's case, the Swedes were treading on new ground.

The Swedish Royal Court announced that Daniel would become "Prince Daniel" and "Duke of Västergötland", corresponding in form to the style used by previous Swedish princes, including Victoria's younger brother Prince Carl Philip, Duke of Värmland, i.e. Prince + Given name + Duke of Province.

As was further announced in May 2010, on his wedding day Daniel was made a prince of Sweden and was granted the style Royal Highness, making him an official member of the Swedish royal family and on par with other senior members of the royal family, such as Prince Carl Philip, Princess Madeleine and Princess Lilian. At Stockholm Cathedral, he was also then made a knight of the Royal Order of the Seraphim.

Since his marriage, Daniel has been styled as "His Royal Highness Prince Daniel, Duke of Västergötland". He added the surname of the Swedish royal family, Bernadotte, making his full legal name Olof Daniel Westling Bernadotte. When referring to both him and his wife, they are called the Crown Princess Couple (Swedish: Kronprinsessparet).

=== Honours ===
==== National honours ====
- Sweden:
  - Knight and Commander of the Royal Order of the Seraphim (RoKavKMO)
  - Commander of the Royal Order of the Polar Star (KNO)
  - Recipient of the Ruby Jubilee Medal of King Carl XVI Gustaf (15 September 2013).
  - Recipient of the 70th Birthday Medal of King Carl XVI Gustaf (30 April 2016).
  - Recipient of the Golden Jubilee Medal of King Carl XVI Gustaf (15 September 2023).

==== Foreign honours ====
- Chile: Grand Cross of the Order of Bernardo O'Higgins
- Denmark: Knight of the Order of the Elephant (R.E.; 6 May 2024)
- Estonia: Grand Cross of the Order of the Cross of Terra Mariana
- Finland: Grand Cross of the Order of the White Rose of Finland
- France: Grand Officer of the National Order of the Legion of Honour (30 January 2024)
- Germany: Grand Cross 1st class of the Order of Merit of the Federal Republic of Germany (7 September 2021)
- Iceland: Grand Cross of the Order of the Falcon
- Italy: Grand Cross of the Order of Merit of the Italian Republic
- Netherlands: Grand Cross of the Order of the Crown (11 October 2022)
- Norway: Grand Cross of the Royal Norwegian Order of Saint Olav
- South Korea: Gwanghwa Medal of the Order of Diplomatic Service Merit
- Spain: Knight Grand Cross of the Royal Order of Civil Merit (16 November 2021)
- Tunisia: Grand Officer of the National Order of Merit

=== Arms ===
Coat of arms

Monogram

Daniel's coat of arms is based on the greater coat of arms of Sweden. It features in the first and fourth quarters, the Three Crowns; in the second, the lion of the House of Bjälbo; and in the third, the lion of the arms of Västergötland, representing the titular designation of his and his wife's dukedom. In the centre, on an inescutcheon, is his personal arms (Westling). This Westling escutcheon is based on the arms of Ockelbo. Surrounding the shield is the chain of the Order of the Seraphim, of which he has been a member since his wedding.
