= Prince Oscar of Sweden =

Prince Oscar of Sweden may refer to:

- Prince Oscar Bernadotte (1859–1953), second son of King Oscar II
- Prince Oscar, Duke of Skåne (born 2016), only son and second child of Victoria, Crown Princess of Sweden
