= Oscar of Sweden =

Oscar or Oskar of Sweden may refer to:

- Oscar I of Sweden (1799–1859), King of Sweden 1844 to 1859
- Oscar II of Sweden (1829–1907), King of Sweden 1872 to 1907
- Oscar, Prince Bernadotte, Prince of Sweden 1852
- Prince Oscar, Duke of Skåne, Prince of Sweden 2016
