= Princess Estelle, Duchess of Östergötland =

Swedish princess (born 2012)

Princess Estelle
- Duchess of Östergötland
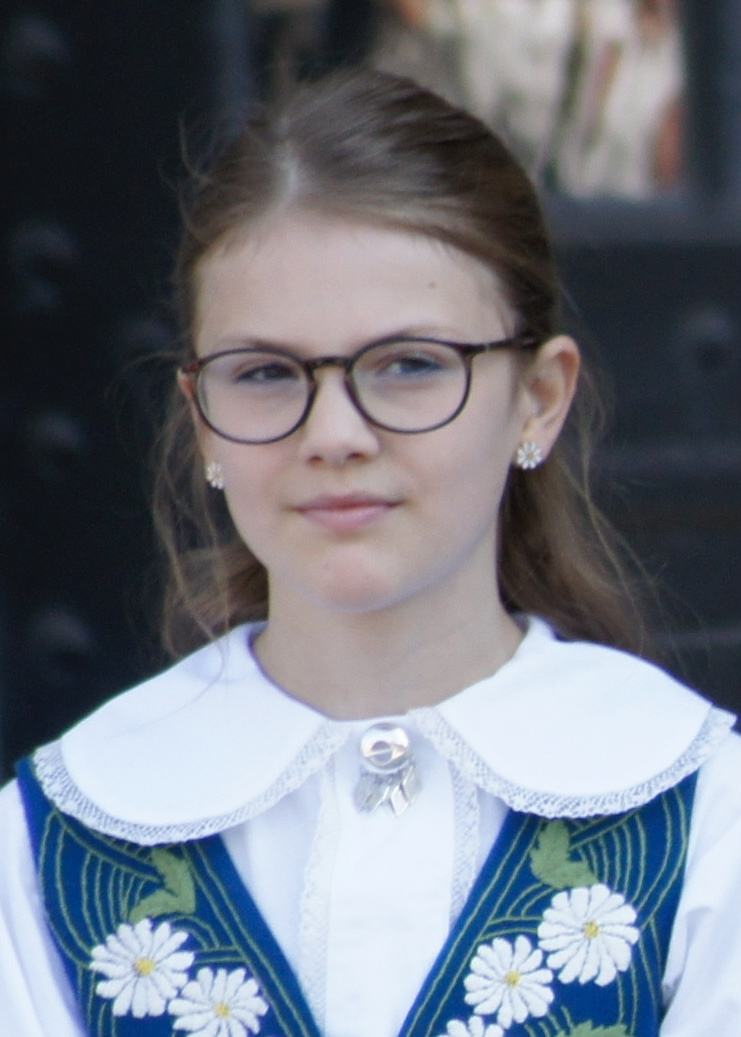
- Estelle in 2023
- Born: 23 February 2012 (age 14); Karolinska University Hospital, Solna, Sweden
Names
- Estelle Silvia Ewa Mary
- House: Bernadotte
- Father: Daniel Westling
- Mother: Victoria, Crown Princess of Sweden

Princess Estelle of Sweden, Duchess of Östergötland (Estelle Silvia Ewa Mary; (Note: The father of the princess, Prince Daniel, registered his legal surname as Bernadotte after marrying her mother, Crown Princess Victoria, who belongs to that royal dynasty. Princess Estelle, like other members of the royal family, does not have a surname.) born 23 February 2012) is a member of the Swedish royal family. She is the elder child of Crown Princess Victoria and Prince Daniel, Duke of Västergötland. She is the eldest grandchild of King Carl XVI Gustaf, and is second in line of succession to the Swedish throne, after her mother.

== Birth ==
Princess Estelle was born to Crown Princess Victoria and Prince Daniel at 04:26 CET on 23 February 2012 at the Karolinska University Hospital in Solna. The birth was greeted by two 21-gun salutes on the island Skeppsholmen, opposite the Royal Palace in the capital Stockholm. Her names and title were announced on 24 February 2012 by her grandfather King Carl XVI Gustaf at a cabinet meeting. After the cabinet meeting, a Te Deum was held in the palace's royal chapel. Prior to the official announcement of her name and title, an error resulted in the royal website displaying the incorrect name and title – Ulrika Marianna Annika David, Duchess of Upplands Väsby, which was later removed. The staff eventually revealed the reason was that they were testing the system.

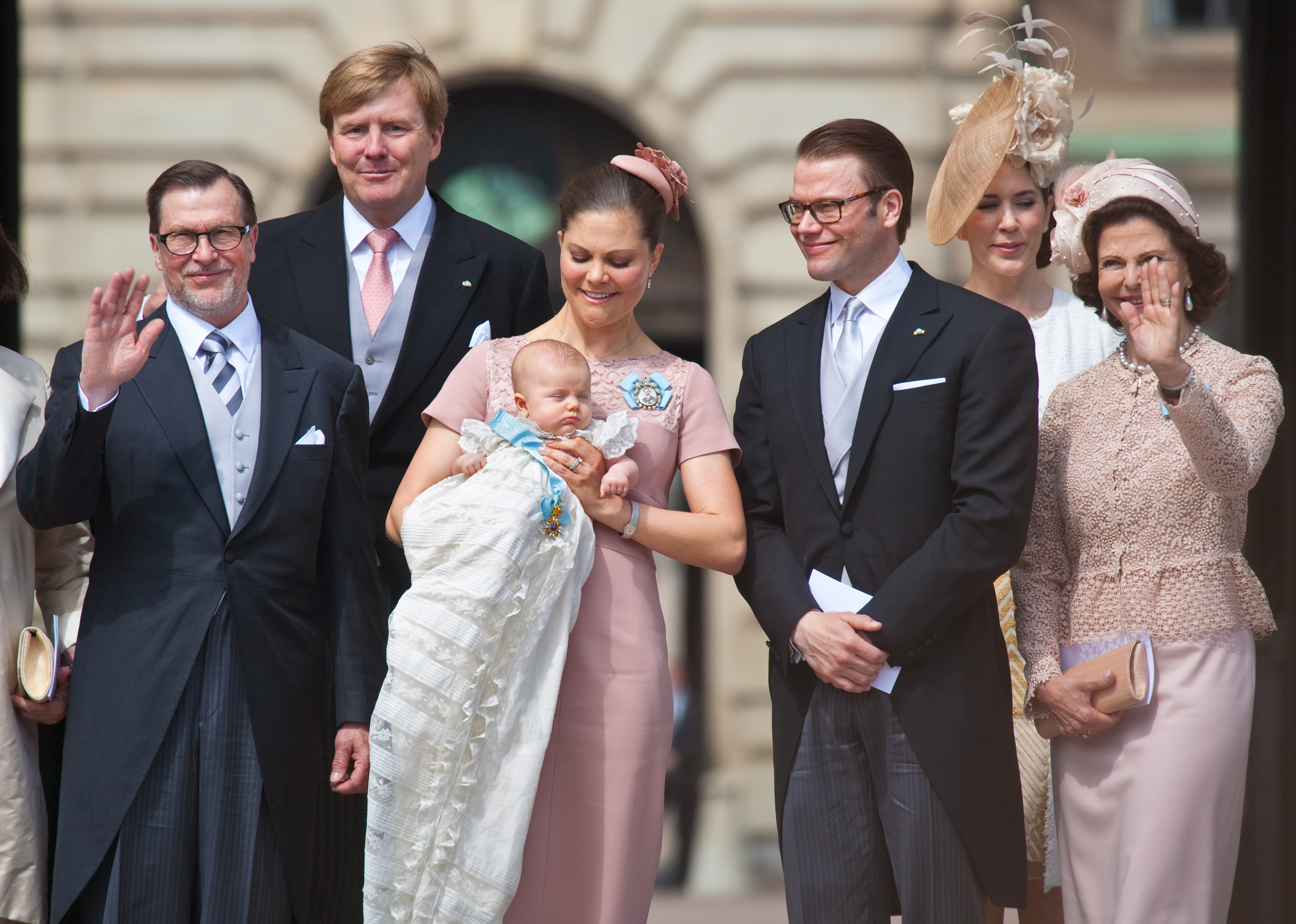
Estelle with her parents, grandparents and godparents

Estelle was baptised on 22 May 2012 at the Royal Chapel of Stockholm Palace in Stockholm, Sweden. Archbishop Anders Wejryd conducted the ceremony. (Note: Estelle had five godparents identified at her baptism: her maternal uncle Prince Carl Philip of Sweden; her paternal aunt Anna Westling-Söderström, Willem-Alexander of the Netherlands (then the Prince of Orange); Queen Mary of Denmark (then Crown Princess); and King Haakon VIII (then Crown Prince).) She was baptised in the family's antique baptismal gown, which was first worn by her great-grandfather Prince Gustaf Adolf when he was baptised in 1906. Her name and date of the baptism were added in embroidery to the gown. On the date of the baptism, a limited-edition prayer book titled Princess Estelle's Prayerbook (Swedish: Prinsessan Estelles bönbok) was released and published.

Princess Estelle is second in the line of succession to the Swedish throne and the first female in Swedish history to be born with a right to inherit the crown that cannot be superseded by the birth of a male heir, as well as the first person in Swedish history to be born of a female heir apparent. The only two princesses of Sweden to be born first in line for the throne were heir presumptive at their birth: Christina (who eventually became queen regnant) and Hedwig Sophia (who was superseded by a younger brother).

== Education ==
On 25 August 2014, Estelle started preschool at Äventyret Preschool in Danderyd Municipality, Stockholm. She started to attend the Campus Manilla School in Royal Djurgården in August 2018.

== Public life ==
As second in line to the Swedish throne, she has been in the public eye since birth. On 17 May 2014, two-year-old Estelle inaugurated a fairytale path, named in her honour as "Duchess Estelle's Fairytale Path" in Tåkern, Östergötland. At the time of her christening, she was presented with a miniature swan and certificate to the trail indicating that in the future she would perform official engagements there. She also visited Linköping Castle, where she was received by Elisabeth Nilsson, Kristina Zetterström and Ann-Catrine Hjerdt, the mayor of Linköping. In 2022 the new Stena Line ferry Stena Estelle was named in honour of the young Princess.

Estelle was named godmother of her first cousin, Princess Ines, in June 2025.

== Honours ==
Styles of Princess Estelle, The Duchess of Östergötland
- Reference style: Her Royal Highness
- Spoken style: Your Royal Highness

Princess Estelle's monogram.

- Sweden :
  - Member of the Royal Order of the Seraphim (LoK av KMO) (23 February 2012, presented 22 May 2012)
  - Recipient of the Commemorative Ruby Jubilee Medal of His Majesty The King (15 September 2013)
  - Recipient of the Commemorative 70th Birthday Medal of His Majesty The King (30 April 2016)
  - Recipient of the Commemorative Golden Jubilee Medal of His Majesty The King (15 September 2023)

== Notes ==
Princess Estelle, Duchess of Östergötland House of Bernadotte Born: 23 February 2012
Swedish royalty
Vacant Title last held by Prince Carl	Duchess of Östergötland; 2012–present	Incumbent
Lines of succession
Preceded by Crown Princess Victoria	Succession to the Swedish throne 2nd in line	Followed by Prince Oscar
