= House of Bernadotte =

Currently regnant royal house of Sweden

- Royal house
- Arms of Bernadotte
- Country: United Kingdoms of Sweden and Norway; Kingdom of Sweden; Principality of Pontecorvo
- Origin: Béarn, Kingdom of France
- Founded: 1818; 208 years ago
- Founder: Charles XIV John
- Current head: Carl XVI Gustaf
- Final ruler: Norway: Oscar II
- Titles: King of Sweden (Note: "By the Grace of God, King of the Swedes, the Goths and the Wends" (used until 1973)); Former titles: King of Norway (Note: "By the Grace of God, King of Norway"); Prince of Pontecorvo
- Estate: Sweden
- Deposition: Norway: Dissolution of the union (1905); Pontecorvo: 1810

The House of Bernadotte (Note: Pronunciation: UK: /ˌbɜːrnəˈdɒt/ BUR-nə-DOT, US: /ˌbɜːrnəˈdɔːt, ˈbɜːrnədɒt/ BUR-nə-DAWT, -dot; Swedish: [bæɳaˈdɔtː]; French: [bɛʁnadɔt].) is the current royal house of Sweden, founded there in 1818 by King Charles XIV John. It was also the royal house of Norway between 1818 and 1905. Its founder was born in Pau in southern France as Jean Bernadotte. Bernadotte, who had been made a General of Division and Minister of War for his service in the French Army during the French Revolution, and Marshal of the French Empire and Prince of Pontecorvo under Napoleon, was adopted by the elderly king of Sweden Charles XIII, who had no other heir and whose Holstein-Gottorp branch of the House of Oldenburg thus was soon to be extinct on the Swedish throne. The current king of Sweden, Carl XVI Gustaf, is a direct descendant of Charles XIV John.

== History of the house ==
Following the conclusion of the Finnish War in 1809, Sweden lost possession of Finland, which had constituted roughly the eastern half of the Swedish realm for centuries. Resentment towards King Gustav IV Adolf precipitated an abrupt coup d'état. Gustav Adolf (and his son Gustav) was deposed and his uncle Charles XIII was elected King in his place. However, Charles XIII was 61 years old and prematurely senile. He was also childless; one child had been stillborn and another died after less than a week. It was apparent almost as soon as Charles XIII ascended the throne that the Swedish branch of the House of Holstein-Gottorp would die with him. In 1810 the Riksdag of the Estates, the Swedish parliament, elected a Danish prince, Prince Christian August of Augustenborg, as heir-presumptive to the throne. He took the name Charles August, but died later that same year.

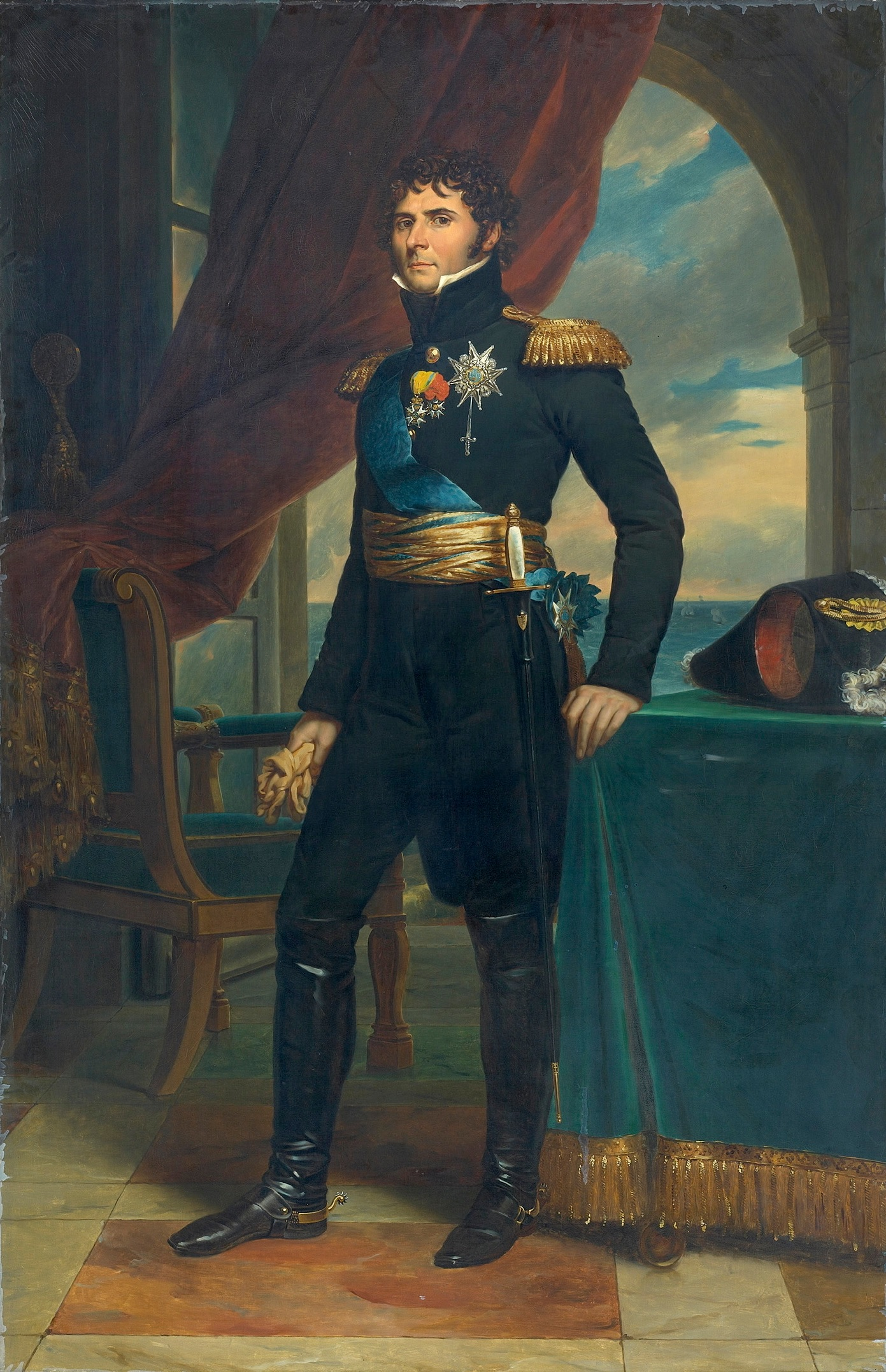
Charles XIV John as Crown Prince of Sweden, portrait by François Gérard, 1811

At this time, Emperor Napoleon of France controlled much of continental Europe, and some of his client states were headed by his siblings. The Riksdag decided to choose a king of whom Napoleon would approve. On 21 August 1810, the Riksdag elected Jean-Baptiste Jules Bernadotte, a Marshal of France, as heir presumptive to the Swedish throne.

The coat of arms of the House of Bernadotte impales the coat of arms of the House of Vasa (heraldic right) and the coat of arms of Bernadotte as Prince of Pontecorvo (heraldic left; which has the Eagle of Zeus, that shares with the House of Bonaparte). It is visible as an inescutcheon in the Greater Coat of Arms of the Realm.

When elected to be Swedish royalty the new heir had been called Prince Bernadotte according to the promotions he received from Emperor Napoleon I, culminating in sovereignty over the Principality of Pontecorvo. Some Swedish experts have asserted that all of his male heirs have had the right to use that Italian title, since the Swedish government never made payments promised Charles John to get him to give up his position in Pontecorvo.

Some members of the house who lost their royal status and Swedish titles due to unapproved marriages have also been given the titles Prince Bernadotte and Count of Wisborg in the nobility of other countries.

=== Bernadotte ===
Bernadotte's arms as sovereign of Pontecorvo

Bernadotte, born in the town of Pau, in the province of Béarn, France, had joined the French army as a simple soldier, becoming a sergeant, then later rose to the rank of general after the French Revolution. In 1798, he married Désirée Clary, whose sister was married to Joseph Bonaparte, Napoleon's elder brother. In 1804, Napoleon promoted Bernadotte to be a Marshal of France. Napoleon also granted him the title "Prince of Pontecorvo".

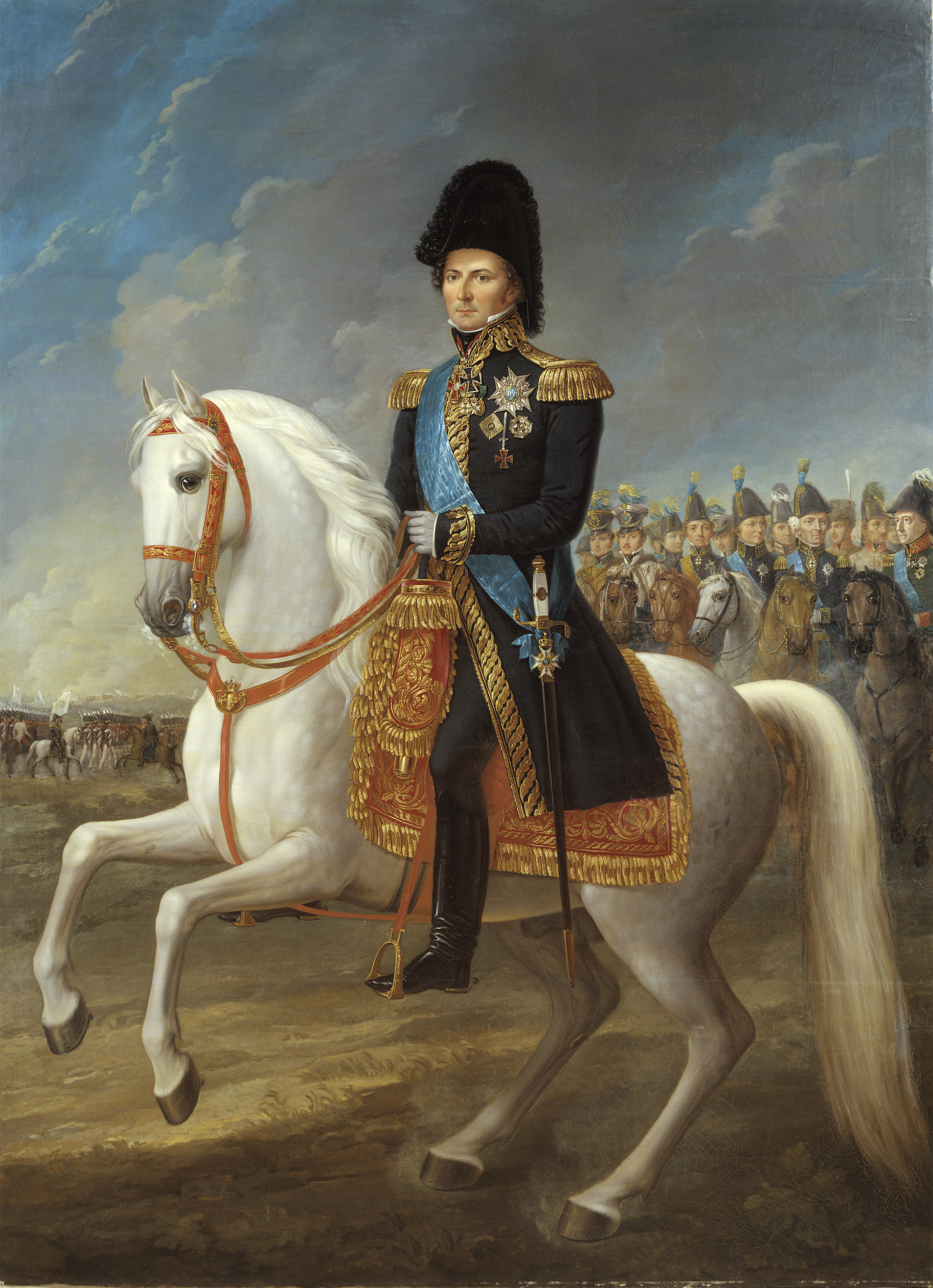
Charles XIV John, born Jean Bernadotte, King of Sweden and Norway 1818–1844 Portrait by Fredric Westin.

As the Crown Prince of Sweden, he assumed the name Charles John (Swedish: Karl Johan) and acted as regent for the remainder of Charles XIII's reign. In 1813, he broke with Napoleon and led Sweden into the Sixth Coalition, an anti-Napoleon alliance. When Norway was awarded to Sweden by the Treaty of Kiel, Norway resisted and declared independence, triggering a brief war between Sweden and Norway. The war ended when Bernadotte persuaded Norway to enter into a personal union with Sweden. Instead of being merely a Swedish province, Norway remained an independent kingdom, though sharing a common monarch and foreign policy. Bernadotte reigned as Charles XIV John of Sweden and Charles III John of Norway from 5 February 1818 until his death on 8 March 1844.

The House of Bernadotte reigned in both countries until the dissolution of the union between Norway and Sweden in 1905. Prince Carl of Denmark was then elected as King Haakon VII of Norway. Carl was a grandson of King Charles XV of Sweden and a great-great-grandson of Charles XIV.

=== French origins ===
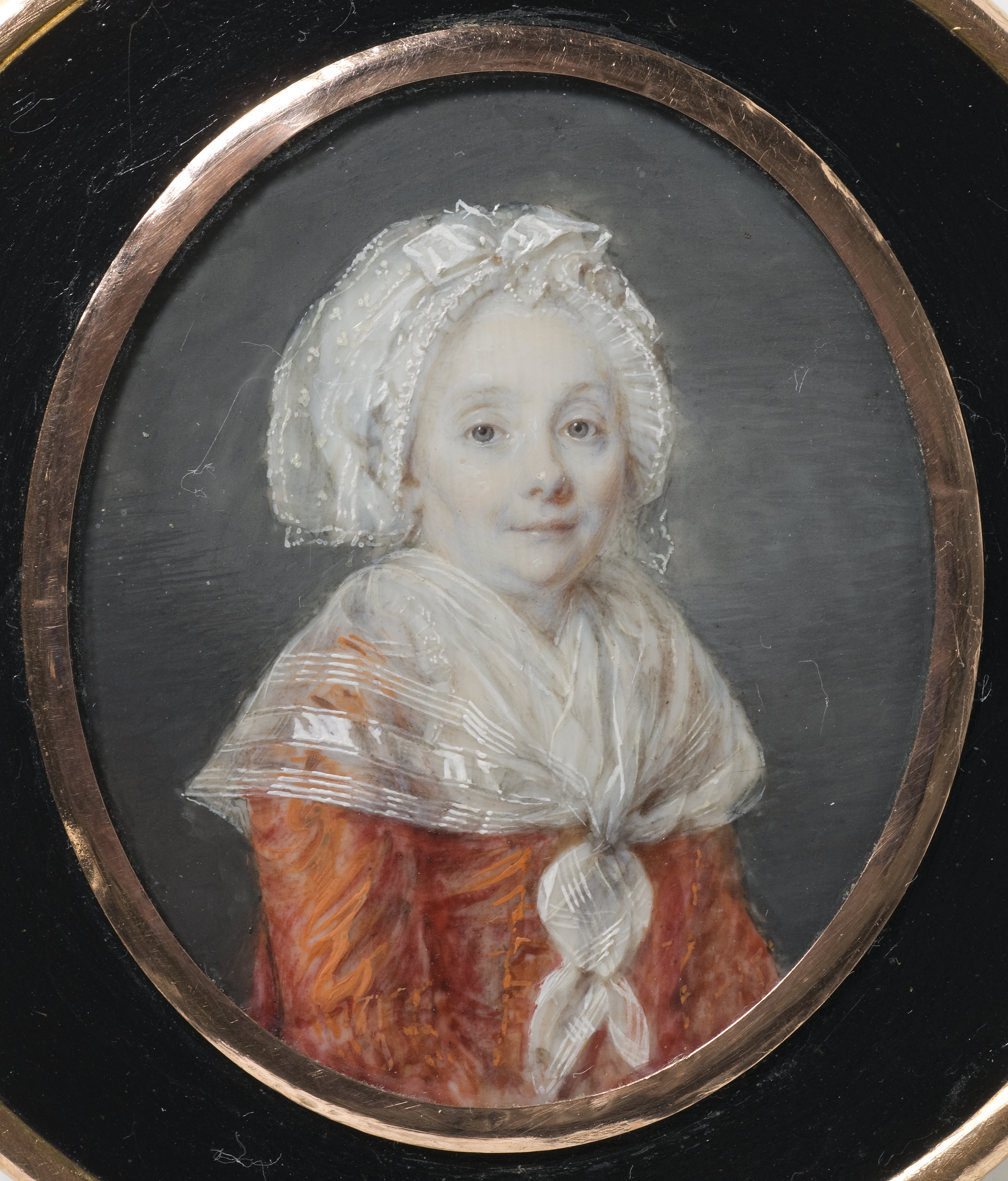
The king's mother Jeanne

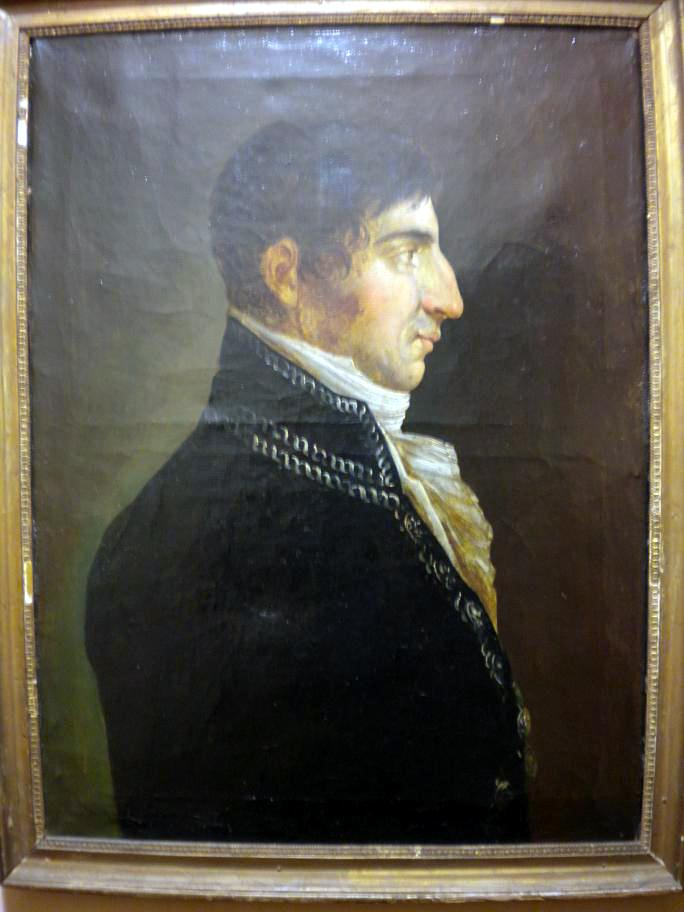
Baron J. E. Bernadotte

King Charles John's first known paternal ancestor was Joandou du Poey, who was a shepherd. He married Germaine de Bernadotte in 1615 in the southern French city of Pau and began using her surname. Through her the couple owned a building there called de Bernadotte, the surname theoretically meaning Young woman of Béarn in local dialect.

His son Henri Bernadotte (1711–1780) married Jeanne de Saint-Jean (1728–1809) and with her was the father of the future Swedish–Norwegian king. Henri was a local prosecutor, from a family of artisans, who had once been imprisoned for debt. This was a modest family which occupied only one floor of the house in a cross street in a popular and peripheral district of Pau.

Two branches of the French Bernadotte family survive. The elder descends from Andrew (André) Bernadotte, an older granduncle of Carl John's, with descendants today in the general population of France. The younger branch divided in two, one branch descending from the king's older brother John (Jean Évangéliste) Bernadotte (1754–1813), the heads of which were French barons as of 1810 with Château Louvie in Louvie-Juzon, in the south of Pau, as their seat (branch extinct with the death of Baron Henri Bernadotte in 1966), and the other branch being the Swedish Royal House.

== Kings of Sweden ==
Greater Coat of Arms of Sweden

- 1818–1844: Charles XIV John
- 1844–1859: Oscar I
- 1859–1872: Charles XV
- 1872–1907: Oscar II
- 1907–1950: Gustaf V
- 1950–1973: Gustaf VI Adolf
- 1973–present: Carl XVI Gustaf

== Kings of Norway ==
- 1818–1844: Charles III John
- 1844–1859: Oscar I
- 1859–1872: Charles IV
- 1872–1905: Oscar II

== Entire royal house ==
This is a list only of the royal house, not of the royal whole family. It excludes in-laws and living persons (2022) who were royal, i.e. born members of the royal house, who no longer are royal today. Royals currently alive are listed in italics. All are listed primarily as Swedish royalty unless otherwise noted.

- King Charles XIV & III John of Sweden and Norway (1763–1844)
  - King Oscar I of Sweden and Norway (1799–1859)
    - King Charles XV & IV of Sweden and Norway (1826–1872)
      - Prince Carl Oscar, Duke of Södermanland (1852–1854)
      - Queen Louise of Denmark (1851–1926)
    - Prince Gustav, Duke of Uppland (1827–1852)
    - King Oscar II of Sweden and Norway (1829–1907)
      - King Gustaf V of Sweden (1858–1950)
        - King Gustaf VI Adolf of Sweden (1882–1973)
          - Prince Gustaf Adolf, Duke of Västerbotten (1906–1947)
            - King Carl XVI Gustaf of Sweden (born 1946)
              - Crown Princess Victoria of Sweden, Duchess of Västergötland (b. 1977)
                - Princess Estelle, Duchess of Östergötland (b. 2012)
                - Prince Oscar, Duke of Skåne (b. 2016)
              - Prince Carl Philip, Duke of Värmland (b. 1979)
              - Princess Madeleine, Duchess of Hälsingland and Gästrikland (b. 1982)
            - Princess Birgitta of Sweden (1937–2024)
          - Prince Sigvard, Duke of Uppland (1907–2002)
          - Prince Bertil, Duke of Halland (1912–1997)
          - Prince Carl Johan, Duke of Dalarna (1916–2012)
          - Queen Ingrid of Denmark (1910–2000)
        - Prince Wilhelm, Duke of Södermanland (1884–1965)
          - Prince Lennart, Duke of Småland (1909–2004)
        - Prince Erik, Duke of Västmanland (1889–1918)
      - Prince Oscar, Duke of Gotland (1859–1953)
      - Prince Carl, Duke of Västergötland (1861–1951)
        - Prince Carl, Duke of Östergötland (1911–2003)
        - Princess Margaretha of Sweden (1899–1977)
        - Crown Princess Märtha of Norway (1901–1954)
        - Queen Astrid of Belgium (1905–1935)
      - Prince Eugen, Duke of Närke (1865–1946)
    - Prince August, Duke of Dalarna (1831–1873)
    - Princess Eugenie of Sweden and Norway (1830–1889)

House of Bernadotte and Link to Earlier Swedish Dynasties

Charles XIV John (1763–1844); Elected Crown Prince by the Riksdag 1810 r. 1818–1844	Eugène de Beauharnais (1781–1824)	Princess Augusta of Bavaria (1788–1851)	Gustav IV Adolf (1778–1837) r. 1792 – 1809
Oscar I (1799–1859) r. 1844–1859	Josephine of Leuchtenberg (1807–1876)	Leopold, Grand Duke of Baden (1790–1852)	Princess Sophie (1801–1865)	Crown Prince Gustav (1799–1877)
Charles XV (1826–1872) r. 1859–1872	Prince Gustaf; Duke of Uppland (1827–1852)	Oscar II (1829–1907) r. 1872–1907	Frederick I, Grand Duke of Baden (1826–1907)
Frederik VIII of Denmark (1843–1912)	Princess Louise; Queen consort of Denmark (1851–1926)	Prince Carl Oscar; Duke of Södermanland (1852–1854)	Gustaf V (1858–1950) r. 1907–1950	Victoria of Baden (1862–1930)
Gustaf VI Adolf (1882–1973) r. 1950–1973
Prince Gustaf Adolf; Duke of Västerbotten (1906–1947)
Carl XVI Gustaf (b. 1946) r. 1973–present
Crown Princess Victoria; Duchess of Västergötland; 1977– (Crown Princess from 1980)	Prince Carl Philip; Duke of Värmland (b. 1979) (Crown Prince 1979–1980)
Princess Estelle; Duchess of Östergötland (b. 2012)

== Bernadotte arms ==
On 5 June 1806, the Marshal of the Empire Jean-Baptiste Jules Bernadotte received from Napoleon the title of prince of Pontecorvo (Pontecorvo is an enclave of the Papal States within the Kingdom of Naples). He was granted these arms with his princedom:

D'azur, au pont à trois arches d'argent, sur une rivière de même, ombrée d'azur, et supportant deux tours du second; au chef des princes souverains d'Empire.

On 21 August 1810, Bernadotte, as crown prince of Sweden, adopted as his personal arms the blason Sweden ancient (Three Crowns) and Sweden modern (Arms of Birger Jarl). After the personal union of Sweden and Norway, Bernadotte became crown prince of Norway. On 14 January 1814, he added to his arms the coat of arms of Norway.

On 5 February 1818 Bernadotte became King of Sweden–Norway under the name Charles XIV John, and Charles III John in Norway. For his personal arms he joined the arms of the House of Vasa with his arms as prince of Pontecorvo:

Tiercé en bande d'azur, d'argent et de gueules à la gerbe d'or brochant [de Vasa] et d'azur, au pont à trois arches d'argent, sur une rivière de même, ombrée d'azur et supportant deux tours du second [de Pontecorvo], le tout surmonté d'une aigle (Aigle de Jupiter) contournée d'or au vol abaissé, empiétant d'un foudre du même [de Bernadotte].

In 1826, following the birth of his grandson prince Charles of Sweden and Norway, King Charles XIV John gave him with the title duke of Scania, with these arms:

Écartelé en sautoir d'or, qui est la croix de Saint-Éric, cantonnée en I, d'azur à trois couronne d'or [de Suède moderne], en II de gueules au lion d'or, couronné du même armé et lampassé de gueules tenant une hache d'armes d'argent emmanchée d'or [de Norvège], en III d'azur à trois barres ondées d'argent, au lion d'or couronné du même, armée et lampassé de gueules [de Suède ancien], au IV d'argent à la tête de griffon de gueules couronnée d'or [brisé de Scanie] sur le tout parti tranché d'azur et de gueules à la banche d'argent et à la gerbe d'or brochant sur le tout [de Vasa] et d'azur, à un pont de trois arches sommé de deux tours crénelées et posé sur une champagne ondée, le tout d'argent [de Pontecorvo], au corbeau de sable, empiétant d'un foudre d'or surmonté d'un chef cousu d'azur semé d'étoiles d'or [de Bernadotte].

The new feature of these arms was that the eagle of Napoleon was replaced by a black raven of Odin. Over this was a field of stars of gold in reference to the title of Marshal of France.

After the death of his father in 1844, prince Oscar became King Oscar I of Sweden and Norway, replaced the field of stars with the Big Dipper/Charles' Wain. In addition to the rules governing the arms of the kingdoms of Sweden-Norway, rules were established for the arms of the queen and the royal prince and princesses.

In 1885, King Oscar II of Sweden replaced the raven with the beak and talons of gold.

In 1908, King Gustav V of Sweden returned the color gold to the Napoleonic Eagle.

Prince Bernadotte, personal, and Count of Wisborg (Swedish: Greve av Wisborg, French: Comte de Wisborg, German: Graf von Wisborg), hereditary, are titles of nobility granted by the Monarch of Luxembourg to four male-members of the Swedish royal family, including their spouses. Since 1892, the comital title has been borne by the male-line descendants of the four princes of Sweden who married without the consent of the King of Sweden, thereby losing their right of succession to the throne for themselves and their descendants, and thus had their royal titles prohibited.

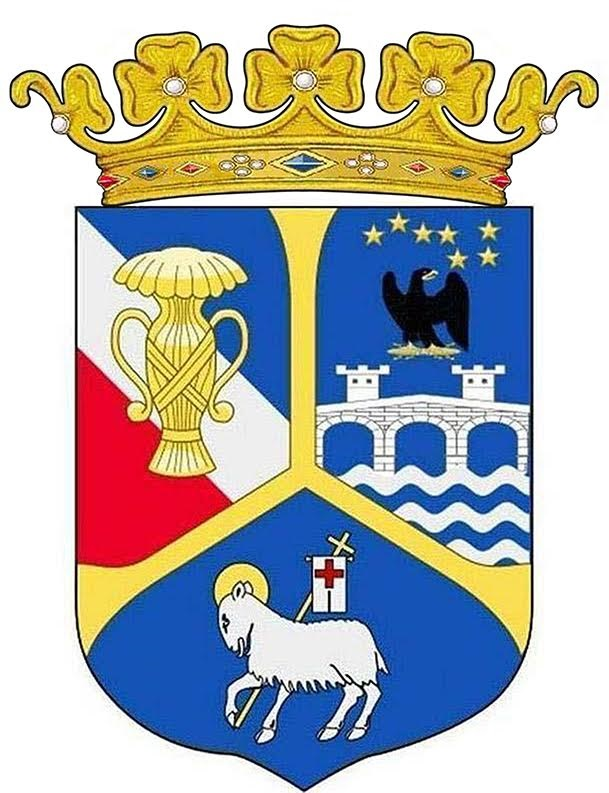
Prince Bernadotte

Bernadotte af Wisborg

Evolution of the Bernadotte Inescutcheon in the Swedish Royal Arms

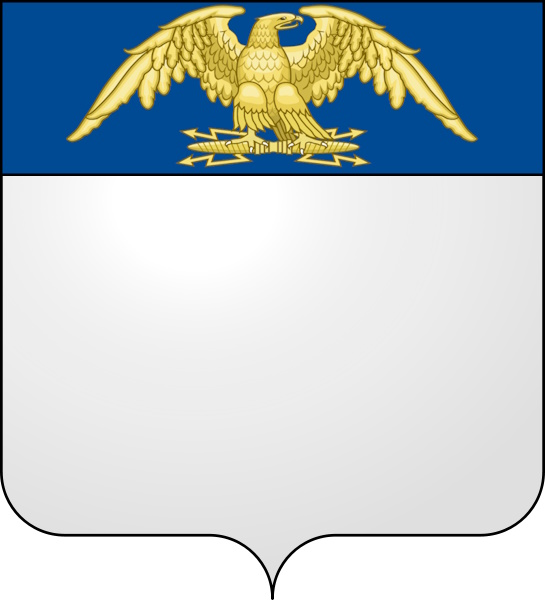
Arms of Jean-Évangéliste Bernadotte, elder brother of Jean-Baptiste Bernadotte	Arms of the city of Pontecorvo	Arms of Sovereign Prince within the French Empire
Arms of the Royal Swedish House of Vasa	Arms of Jean-Baptiste Bernadotte as Prince of Pontecorvo
Viking Raven Banner showing one of the Ravens of Odin.	Inescutcheon Arms of Charles XIV (and III) John (since 1818), emphasizing his kinship with the Swedish Royal House of Vasa.	Arms of Charles XIV (and III) John as King of Sweden and Norway
Big Dipper/Charles' Wain (in Swedish: Karlavagnen) to symbolize the northern sky.	Inescutcheon arms changed in 1826 to one of the Ravens of Odin against a star field symbolizing Marshal of the Empire
Eagle of Jupiter with Lightning Bolt	Inescutcheon Arms of the Bernadottes 1844–1885 showing the Big Dipper
Napoleonic Eagle	In 1885, King Oscar II of Sweden replaced the raven with a black Napoleonic Eagle (Eagle of Jupiter) with the beak, talons, and lightning bolt of gold. Odin was believed to shapeshift to an eagle.
In 1908, King Gustav V of Sweden returned the color of the eagle to gold to match a Napoleonic Eagle.

== See also ==
- Monarchy of Sweden
- List of Swedish monarchs
- Maison Bernadotte (French)
- Swedish royal family
- Guadeloupe Fund
- Count of Wisborg
- Swedish Act of Succession
- Line of succession to the Swedish throne
- Coat of arms of Sweden
- Armorial of the House of Bernadotte

== Notes ==
House of Bernadotte
Preceded by House of Oldenburg (Holstein-Gottorp branch)	Ruling house of the Kingdom of Sweden; 1818–present	Incumbent
Preceded by House of Oldenburg (Holstein-Gottorp branch)	Ruling house of the Kingdom of Norway; 1818–1905	Succeeded by House of Oldenburg (Glücksburg branch)
