= Duchies in Sweden =

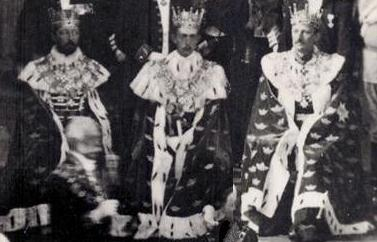
Prince Eugen, Duke of Närke, Prince Wilhelm, Duke of Södermanland and Prince Carl, Duke of Västergötland in their coronets attend the 1905 opening of parliament in the Throne Room of Stockholm Palace.

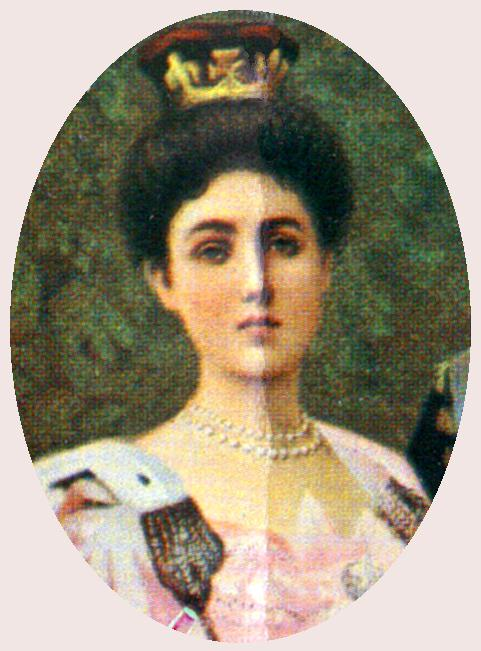
Princess Margareta, Duchess of Scania (Margaret of Connaught) poses in 1905 at Stockholm Palace, wearing her British coronet, for a subsequently colored photograph.

Duchies in Sweden have been allotted since the 13th century to powerful Swedes, almost always to princes of Sweden (only in some of the dynasties) and wives of the latter. From the beginning these duchies were often centers of regional power, where their dukes and duchesses had considerable executive authority of their own, under the central power of their kings or queens regnant. Since the reign of King Gustav III the titles have practically been nominal, with which their bearers only rarely have enjoyed any ducal authority, though often maintaining specially selected leisure residences in their provinces and some limited measure of cultural attachment to them.

== Today ==
In Sweden today, Duke (hertig) is considered a dynastical title, and is only given to members of the Royal House (currently Bernadotte). Unlike British dukedoms, for example, these Swedish titles are not hereditary. Modern Swedish duchies have always been named for the historical provinces of Sweden, which are no longer governmental entities. Currently, there are twelve such duchies one of which includes two of the provinces:

- The Duchess and Duke of Västergötland (Crown Princess Victoria and Prince Daniel)
  - The Duchess of Östergötland (Princess Estelle)
  - The Duke of Skåne (Prince Oscar)
- The Duke and Duchess of Värmland (Prince Carl Philip and Princess Sofia)
  - The Duke of Södermanland (Prince Alexander)
  - The Duke of Dalarna (Prince Gabriel)
  - The Duke of Halland (Prince Julian)
  - The Duchess of Västerbotten (Princess Ines)
- The Duchess of Hälsingland and Gästrikland (Princess Madeleine)
  - The Duchess of Gotland (Princess Leonore)
  - The Duke of Ångermanland (Prince Nicolas)
  - The Duchess of Blekinge (Princess Adrienne)

The titles today are given to, and kept by, legitimate members of the Swedish royal family for life, except for Swedish monarchs, who do not continue to hold ducal titles after ascending the throne. Only in connection with his ascension in 1973 has the current king occasionally been referred to as King of Sweden and Duke of Jämtland. He became the Duke of Jämtland after his christening, and held that title until his ascension to the Swedish throne in 1973. However, his wife, current Queen Silvia, whom he married in 1976, is not a duchess, and no other queen consorts have ever continued to have any such title either, after their husbands became King. Otherwise, royal spouses of ducal title holders are also created dukes and duchesses upon marriage (this would not include spouses who do not become Swedish royalty, such as those who married former dukes who had given up their titles for unapproved marriages). The first example of a man acquiring the Swedish ducal title of a woman was at the 2010 marriage of Crown Princess Victoria to Prince Daniel. Currently the prerequisite for a ducal title has been assumed by the public to be the position of Prince or Princess of Sweden, and for that being a Swedish citizen, however no definite policy has been published.

== History ==
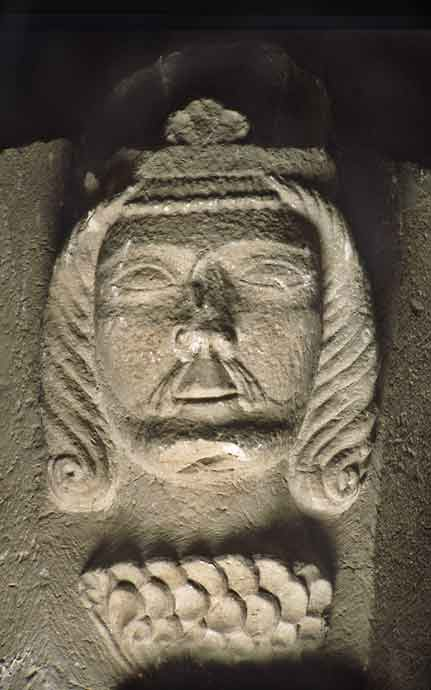
Prince Magnus as Duke of Sweden in a 13th-century bust

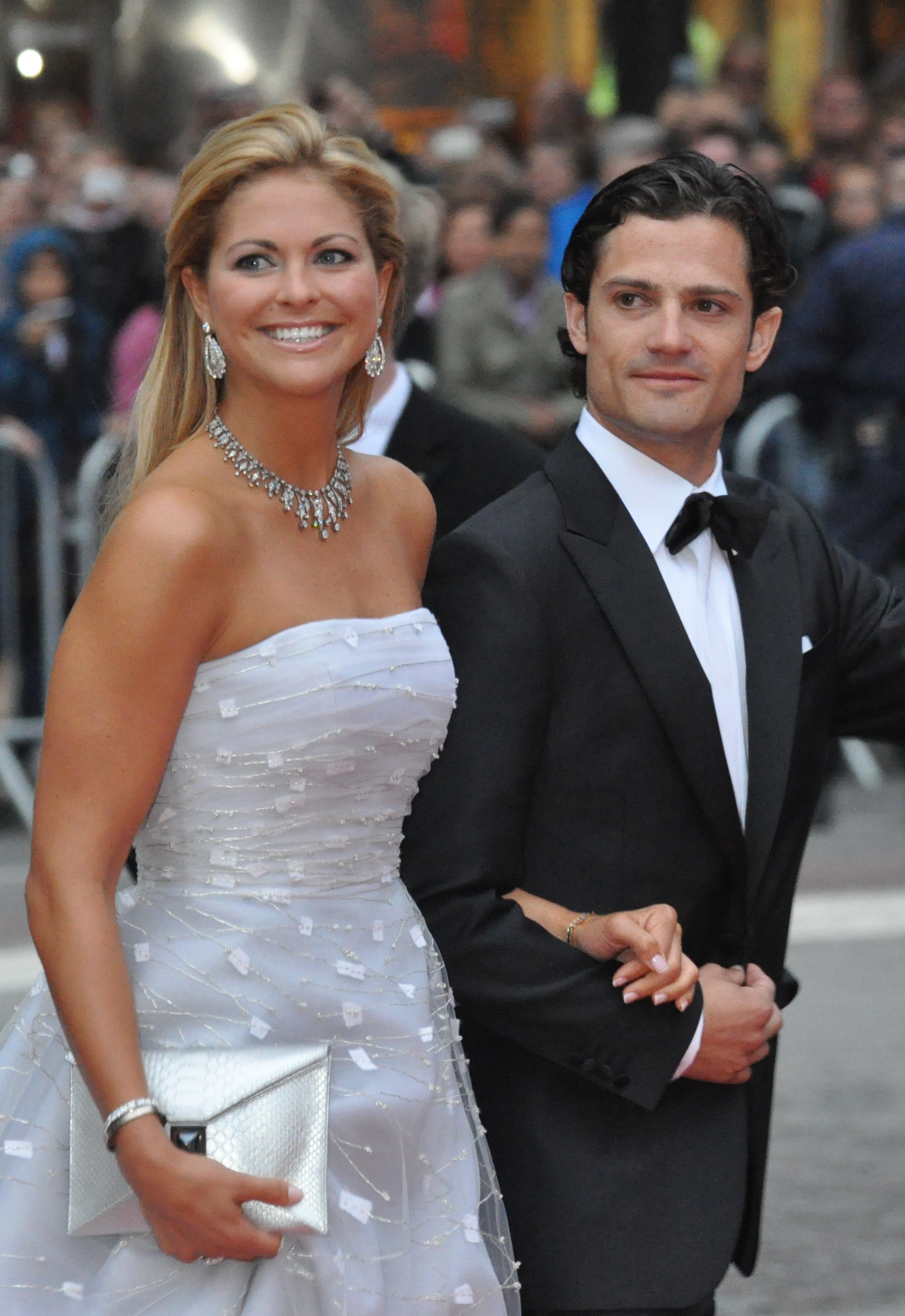
Princess Madeleine, Duchess of Hälsingland and Gästrikland, with her brother Prince Carl Philip, Duke of Värmland, in 2010.

The first use in Swedish of the title of hertig was in 1266 by Prince Magnus, son of Princess Ingeborg and Birger Jarl. That title (derived from German "herzog") then replaced the older Nordic "jarl", both translated into the Latin title dux, However, professor of art history Jan Svanberg is of the opinion that since Birger Jarl (died 1266) was depicted with a ducal coronet of English and continental European design, he actually was a duke, and that his Latin title of Dux Sueorum should be given as Duke and Regent of Sweden in English. Svanberg's opinion would then make duchesses of both of Birger's wives Ingeborg (died 1254) and Matilda (died 1288), in English usage.

In the 13th and 14th century, kings of the Bjälbo dynasty gave his sons duchies to rule as fiefs. The geography of these duchies could be unclear, as they were not always within the boundaries of one province and could also be reallotted with territorial changes. Feuds between a king and ducal brothers were common, and ended at times in assassination and fratricide. There was only one non-royal Swedish duke, Bengt Algotsson, Duke of Halland and Finland in 1350s. The tradition was discontinued during the Kalmar union.

After the Kalmar Union period, just before his death in 1560, King Gustav I took up the tradition by making his sons John, Magnus and Carl powerful dukes, together ruling much more of the kingdom than their older half-brother Eric, who had held a duchy in the southeast. When Eric became King Eric XIV, the imbalance of power his father had created became destructive. John, with the aid of Carl, eventually revolted, dethroned Eric and became king; Magnus proved unimportant due to mental health issues, but Carl's duchy of Södermanland prospered as a separate territory for several decades and also made his eventual rise to the throne possible. His duchy was inherited by his younger son, Carl Philip, who died in 1622 having been the last holder of one of the semi-autonomous Swedish duchies, which his brother, King Gustav II Adolph, officially abolished in 1618.

During the subsequent rule of Queen Christina of Sweden, however, her cousin and heir Carl Gustav of the Palatinate-Zweibrücken was titled Duke of Öland by the Swedish sovereign herself, but her government refused to acknowledge that title officially. His father was created Duke of Stegeborg in 1651, a title that a younger brother of Carl Gustav's eventually inherited.

In 1772, King Gustav III reinstated the appointment of dukes, now non-hereditary, for his brothers as courtesy titles, which added to their international prestige and domestic influence. Since then, all Swedish princes have been created dukes of a province at birth, as well as one Great Prince or Grand Duke of Finland (who died in infancy). During the 20th century, because of constitutional restraints, several princes gave up their royal titles for marriages that were not approved by the King (see Bernadotte af Wisborg). Whether or not they then actually lost their ducal titles too has never been formally or legally determined.

For the first time since the 14th century a princess of Sweden was created duchess in her own right in 1980, coinciding with the amendment of the Act of Succession allowing female succession to the throne. Thus, King Carl XVI Gustaf's eldest daughter Victoria became Crown Princess (displacing her younger brother Carl Philip) and received the title of Duchess of Västergötland. Her younger sister Madeleine was the first princess to be created duchess at birth, and also the first to get a double duchy (see above), roughly corresponding with the modern governmental limits of Gävleborg County. Such modern ducal titles are handled by the King of Sweden personally, are unregulated by law and not registered as names in the Swedish Tax Agency's population census.

Now the title holders are mainly known domestically as Crown Princess Victoria, Prince Daniel, Princess Estelle, Prince Oscar, Prince Carl Philip, Princess Sofia, Prince Alexander, Prince Gabriel, Prince Julian, Princess Ines, Princess Madeleine, Princess Leonore, Prince Nicolas and Princess Adrienne though the ducal titles often are included in formal communication and royal court usage. In writing to them, it is considered correct to address all of them but the Crown Princess by ducal title. As of 1772, the dukes and duchesses do not normally reside permanently within their duchies, though they are associated with them to some extent by making occasional visits, seen as beneficial to public relations for the County Administrative Boards and local business.

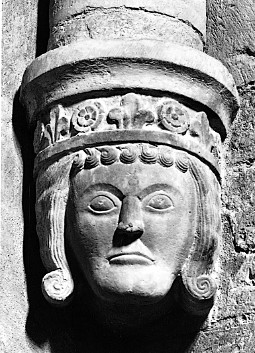
Birger Jarl wears a ducal coronet of European style in a contemporary bust.

== List of dukes and duchesses by duchy in Sweden ==
Since Magnus III of Sweden was the first bearer of the Swedish title hertig, this list begins, in the chronological aspect, with him.

This list of dukes and duchesses in Sweden excludes minor duchies (individual towns, manors, mines, estates) as well as dominions such as Estonia and Bremen-Verden. For ease of reference, most provinces are listed by their modern Swedish names with Latin or English exonyms, by which many past dukes have been known, given as alternatives. Years given are those during which ducal titles incontestably were held, regardless of subsequent status as monarchs or former royalty. Since the accession of Charles XIII in 1809, the Royal Court of Sweden has neither recognized that ducal titles are continued to be borne by kings, nor that those were still valid that had been given to princes who subsequently lost their royal status (also see Sigvard Bernadotte). There is also no evidence that domestic provincial ducal titles continued to be borne by kings in earlier eras.

=== Sweden and Swealand (Dux Sueorum as hertig) ===
Title held (years)	Name	Notes
1252–1275	Prince Magnus	appointed, became King 1275, died 1290
1275	Prince Eric	appointed (also Småland), died with title
1284–1310	Prince Eric	appointed, gave up title (also Södermanland) 1310, then Duke of Dalsland, North Halland, Värmland & Västergötland
1318–1321	Princess Ingeborg	widow of previous Eric, appointed & held this title in her own right as regent, continued as Duchess of North Halland
Title discontinued 1321		

=== Ångermanland also known as Angermannia ===
Title held (years)	Name	Arms	Notes
House of Bernadotte
2015–present	Prince Nicolas		from birth

=== Blekinge also known as Blekingia ===
Title held (years)	Name	Arms	Notes
House of Bernadotte
2018–present	Princess Adrienne		from birth

=== Dalarna also known as Dalecarlia ===
Title held (years)	Name	Arms	Notes
House of Bernadotte
1831–1873	Prince August		from birth, died with title
1864–1914	Princess Teresia		as wife & widow of Prince August, died with title
1916–1946	Prince Carl Johan		from birth, title no longer recognized due to unapproved marriage, died 2012
2017–present	Prince Gabriel		from birth

=== Dalsland also known as Dalia ===
Title held (years)	Name	Notes
1310–1318	Prince Eric	appointed, also Duke of North Halland, Värmland & Västergötland (also see Swealand 1284–1310), died with titles
1312–1326	Princess Ingeborg	as wife & widow of Prince Eric, also Duchess of Värmland & Västergötland, deposed, continued as Duchess of North Halland
1560–1595	Prince Magnus	see Östergötland (same years)

=== Finland ===
Title held (years)	Name	Notes
1284–1291	Benedict	appointed, also Bishop of Linköping, died with title
1302–1318	Valdemar	appointed, also Duke of Uppland & Öland from 1310, died with titles
1302–1305	Christina	as first wife of Waldemar above, until divorce
1312–1353	Ingeborg	as second wife and widow of Valdemar above, deposed, continued as Duchess of Öland in her own right, died c.1357
1353–1357	Benedict	appointed, deposed, also Duke of Halland until 1356, died c.1360
1556–1563	John	appointed, deposed, became King of Sweden & Finland 1569, died 1592 (see below King John III)
1562–1563	Catherine	as (first) wife of Prince John above, deposed, became queen in 1569, died in 1583
1589–1606	John	from birth, deposed, continued as Duke of East Gothland, died with that title 1618
1580s–1599	Kings John III & Sigmund	as monarchs also held the nominal title of Grand Duke of Finland, simultaneously with John just above
1606–1632	Gustav Adolph	appointed, also Duke of Estonia 1607-1618, Södermanland 1604-1607 & Västmanland 1610-1611, became King of Sweden and Finland in 1611

From the reign of Gustavus Adolphus, Grand duke of Finland was a part of the official titles of the king of Sweden until the Treaty of Fredrikshamn in 1809.

=== Gotland also known as Gothland ===
Title held (years)	Name	Arms	Notes
House of Bernadotte
1859–1888	Prince Oscar		from birth, title no longer recognized due to non-royal marriage, died 1953
2014–present	Princess Leonore		from birth

Queen Desideria (1777-1860) was also known outside of Sweden as Countess of Gotland.

=== Gästrikland also known as Gestricland ===
Title held (years)	Name	Arms	Notes
House of Bernadotte
1982–present	Princess Madeleine		see Hälsingland (same period)

=== Halland also known as Hallandia ===
Title held (years)	Name	Arms	Notes
North Halland: 1310–1318	Prince Eric		see Dalsland (same years)
1312–1341	Princess Ingeborg		as wife & widow of Eric above (see further Halland below)
South Halland: 1327–1330	Lord Canute Porse		second husband of Ingeborg above, appointed, died with title
Halland: 1327–1353	Duchess Ingeborg (above)		as wife & widow of Lord Canute above & from 1341 in her own right (also see Swealand 1318–1321), deposed
1330–1350	Lord Canute Canuteson Porse		son of Ingeborg & Canute above, inherited & held title with brother Hacon below & mother, died with title
1330–1350	Lord Hacon Canuteson Porse		son of Ingeborg & Canute above, inherited & held title with brother Canute above & mother, died with title
1353–1356	Lord Benedict Algotsson		appointed (not royal) & deposed (also Duke of Finland till 1357)
1356–1361	Duchess Ingeborg		again appointed in her own right (see 1327-1353 above), died with title
House of Bernadotte
1912–1997	Prince Bertil		from birth, died with title
1976–2013	Princess Lilian		as wife & widow of Prince Bertil above, died with title
2021–present	Prince Julian		from birth

=== Hälsingland also known as Helsingia ===
Title held (years)	Name	Arms	Notes
House of Bernadotte
1982–present	Princess Madeleine		from birth, also Duchess of Gästrikland

=== Jämtland also known as Iemptia ===
Title held (years)	Name	Arms	Notes
House of Bernadotte
1946–1973	Prince Carl Gustaf		from birth, current King as of 1973

=== Närke also known as Nericia ===
Title held (years)	Name	Arms	Notes
1560–1604	Prince Carl		see Södermanland (same years)
1579–1589	Princess Maria		see Södermanland (same years)
1592–1604	Princess Christina		see Södermanland (same years)
1607–1618	Prince Carl Philip		see Södermanland (same years)
House of Bernadotte
1865–1947	Prince Eugen		from birth, died with title
1947–present	Vacant		

Saint Bridget (1303-1373) was also known outside of Sweden as Princess of Nericia.

=== Öland also known as Eyland ===
Title held (years)	Name	Notes
1310–1318	Prince Valdemar	appointed, also Duke of Uppland (and Finland from 1302), died with titles
1312–c.1357	Princess Ingeborg	as wife & widow of Waldemar above, also Duchess of Uppland (& Finland), died with this title
1318–c.1328	Prince Eric	son of Waldemar and Ingeborg above, inherited (at age 2) & held title with mother, died with title
1557–1560	Crown Prince Eric	see Småland (same years)
1650–1654	Crown Prince Carl Gustav	appointed, became King 1654, died 1660

=== Östergötland also known as East Gothland ===
Title held (years)	Name	Arms	Notes
1560–1595	Prince Magnus		appointed, also Duke of Dalsland, died with titles
1606–1618	Prince John		appointed, died with title (also Duke of Finland 1589-1607)
1612–1618	Princess Maria Elizabeth		as wife & widow of Prince John above, died with title
1772–1803	Prince Frederick Adolf		appointed, died with title
House of Bernadotte
1829–1872	Prince Oscar		from birth, became King 1872, died 1907
1857–1872	Princess Sophia		as wife of Prince Oscar above, became his queen 1872, died 1913
1911–1937	Prince Carl		from birth, title no longer recognized due to unapproved marriage, died 2003
2012–present	Princess Estelle		from birth

=== Skåne also known as Scania ===
Title held (years)	Name	Arms	Notes
House of Bernadotte
1826–1859	Prince Carl		from birth, became King 1859, died 1872
1850–1859	Crown Princess Louise		as wife of Carl above, became his queen 1859, died 1871
1882–1950	Prince Gustaf Adolf		from birth, became King 1950, died 1973
1905-1920	Crown Princess Margareta		as first wife of Prince Gustaf Adolf above, died with title
1923–1950	Crown Princess Louise		as second wife of Gustaf Adolf above, became his queen 1950, died 1965
2016–present	Prince Oscar		from birth

=== Småland also known as Small Lands and the Smallands ===
Title held (years)	Name	Arms	Notes
1275	Prince Eric		see Swealand (same year)
1557–1560	Crown Prince Eric		appointed, also Duke of Öland, became King 1560, deposed as such 1569, died 1577
1782–1783	Prince Carl Gustav		from birth, died with title
House of Bernadotte
1909–1932	Prince Lennart		from birth, title no longer recognized due to unapproved marriage, died 2004
1932–present	Vacant		

=== Södermanland also known as Southmanland and Sudermania ===
Title held (years)	Name	Arms	Notes
1302–1310	Prince Eric		see Swealand 1284-1310
1318–1321	Duchess Ingeborg		see Swealand (same years)
1560–1604	Prince Carl		appointed, also Duke of Närke and Värmland, became King 1604, died 1611
1579–1589	Princess Maria		as first wife of Prince Carl above, also Duchess of Närke and Värmland, died with titles
1592–1604	Princess Christina		as second wife of Prince Carl above, also Duchess of Närke and Värmland, became his queen 1604, died 1625
1604–1607	Crown Prince Gustav Adolph		appointed, deposed here, later Duke of Västmanland, became King 1611
1607–1618	Prince Carl Philip		appointed, deposed
1772–1809	Prince Carl		appointed, became King 1809, died 1818
1774–1809	Princess Charlotte		as wife of Prince Carl above, became his queen 1809, died 1818
House of Bernadotte
1811–1844	Prince Oscar		appointed, became King 1844, died 1859
1823–1844	Crown Princess Josephine		as wife of Crown Prince Oscar above, became his queen 1844, died 1876
1852–1854	Prince Carl Oscar		from birth, died with title
1884–1965	Prince Wilhelm		from birth, died with title
1909–1914	Princess Maria		as wife of Prince Wilhelm above, until divorce
2016–present	Prince Alexander		from birth

=== Stegeborg ===
Title held (years)	Name	Notes
1651–1652	Prince John Casimir	appointed, as prince consort widower of Princess Catherine (who was styled Countess of Stegeborg), died with title
1652–1654	Crown Prince Carl Gustav	inherited title as son of Prince John Casimir and Princess Catherine above, see Öland 1650-1654
1654-1689	Prince Adolph John	inherited title as brother of Carl Gustav above, died with title
1662–1689	Elsa Elizabeth	as wife of Prince Adolph John above, died with title
Title defunct 1689		

=== Uppland also known as Upland ===
Title held (years)	Name	Arms	Notes
1310–1318	Prince Valdemar		see Öland (same years)
1312–1318	Princess Ingeborg		see Öland 1312–1357, deposed here
House of Bernadotte
1827–1852	Prince Gustaf		from birth, died with title
1907–1934	Prince Sigvard		from birth, title no longer recognized due to unapproved marriage, died 2002
1934–present	Vacant		

=== Värmland also known as Vermelandia and Wermelandia ===
Title held (years)	Name	Arms	Notes
1310–1318	Prince Eric		see Dalsland (same years)
1312–1326	Princess Ingeborg		see Dalsland (same years)
1560–1604	Prince Carl		see Södermanland (same years)
1579–1589	Princess Maria		see Södermanland (same years)
1592–1604	Princess Christina		see Södermanland (same years)
1607–1618	Prince Carl Philip		see Södermanland (same years)
1798	Prince Carl Adolph		from birth, died with title
House of Bernadotte
1858–1907	Prince Gustaf		from birth, became king 1907, died 1950
1881–1907	Crown Princess Victoria		as wife of Gustaf above, became his queen 1907, died 1930
1979–present	Prince Carl Philip		from birth
2015–present	Princess Sofia		as wife of Prince Carl Philip above

=== Västmanland also known as Westmania ===
Title held (years)	Name	Arms	Notes
1610–1611	Crown Prince Gustav Adolph		appointed, earlier Duke of Södermanland, became King 1611, died 1632 (also Grand Duke of Finland 1607-1611)
House of Bernadotte
1889–1918	Prince Erik		from birth, died with title
1918–present	Vacant		

=== Västerbotten also known as West Bothnia ===
Title held (years)	Name	Arms	Notes
House of Bernadotte
1906–1947	Prince Gustaf Adolf		from birth, died with title
1932–1972	Princess Sibylla		as wife & widow of Prince Gustaf Adolf above, died with title
2025–present	Princess Ines		from birth

=== Västergötland also known as West Gothland ===
Title held (years)	Name	Arms	Notes
1310–1318	Prince Eric		see Dalsland (same years)
1312–1326	Princess Ingeborg		see Dalsland (same years)
House of Bernadotte
1861–1951	Prince Carl		from birth, died with title
1897–1958	Princess Ingeborg		as wife & widow of Prince Carl above, died with title
1980–present	Crown Princess Victoria		appointed
2010–present	Prince Daniel		as husband of Crown Princess Victoria above

Note: For duchies that begin with Å and Ö see A and O above

=== Non-ducal provinces ===
Five of Sweden's 25 modern provinces are not listed above because as of 2025 they have never had any dukes or duchesses:

- Bohuslän also known as Bahusia
- Härjedalen also known as Heriedalia
- Lapland also known as Laponia and since 1809 as Swedish Lappland (Note: Two extramarital sons of King Oscar I were unofficially called Princes of Lapland.)
- Medelpad also known as Medelpadia
- Norrbotten also known as North Bothnia

Heraldically, they are considered duchies. On 18 January 1884 the Privy Council gave all provinces the right of use to a ducal coronet for their coat of arms.

== See also ==
- Duke of Estonia
- Duke of Finland
- Duke of Halland
