= Prince Carl Philip, Duke of Värmland =

Swedish prince (born 1979)

Prince Carl Philip
- Duke of Värmland
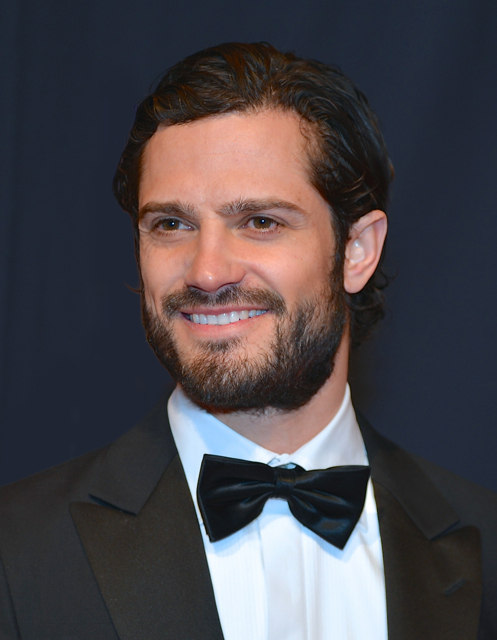
- Carl Philip in 2014
- Born: Carl Philip Edmund Bertil; 13 May 1979 (age 47); Stockholm Palace, Stockholm, Sweden
- Spouse: Sofia Hellqvist (m. 2015)
- Issue: Prince Alexander, Duke of Södermanland; Prince Gabriel, Duke of Dalarna; Prince Julian, Duke of Halland; Princess Ines, Duchess of Västerbotten
Names
- Carl Philip Edmund Bertil
- House: Bernadotte
- Father: Carl XVI Gustaf
- Mother: Silvia Sommerlath
- Education: Swedish University of Agricultural Sciences

Prince Carl Philip of Sweden, Duke of Värmland (Carl Philip Edmund Bertil; born 13 May 1979) is the only son and the second of three children of King Carl XVI Gustaf and Queen Silvia. As of 2022, Prince Carl Philip is fourth in the line of succession, after his older sister, Crown Princess Victoria, his niece and goddaughter Princess Estelle, and his nephew Prince Oscar. He lives with his wife, Princess Sofia, and four children in Villa Solbacken in Djurgården, Stockholm.

== Early life and education ==
Carl Philip was born at Stockholm Palace, Sweden, on 13 May 1979 at 07:20 (CET). He was baptised at the Royal Chapel on 31 August 1979. (Note: His godparents are: Princess Birgitta of Sweden (paternal aunt) Prince Bertil, Duke of Halland (paternal great-uncle), Margrethe II of Denmark (paternal grandfather's niece through his sister Ingrid of Sweden) and Prince Leopold of Bavaria.)

Carl Philip was heir apparent to the throne of Sweden (and thus held the title Crown Prince) for seven months, until 1 January 1980 when a change in the constitution came into effect which made natural birth order the basis for succession to the throne, replacing the principle of agnatic primogeniture. His elder sister Victoria became heir apparent and Crown Princess, with Carl Philip becoming second in line.

During 1984–1986, Carl Philip attended the Västerled parish preschool. In the autumn of 1986, he started school at Smedslättsskolan in Bromma which he attended at junior level. For the intermediate level, he attended Ålstensskolan in Bromma, proceeding from there, in the autumn of 1992, to senior level at Enskilda Gymnasiet in Stockholm. He was confirmed on 9 July 1994 at the Vadstena Abbey Church. In the autumn of 1994, Carl Philip enrolled at Kent School. He then continued his studies in a science programme at Lundsbergs upper secondary school. He graduated in the spring of 1999. In 2007–2008, he studied graphic design at the Rhode Island School of Design for one year. In 2011, Carl Philip finished his studies in Agricultural and Rural Management at the Swedish University of Agricultural Sciences in Alnarp.

Carl Philip has dyslexia, as do his father King Carl XVI Gustaf and his sister Crown Princess Victoria.

== Interests ==
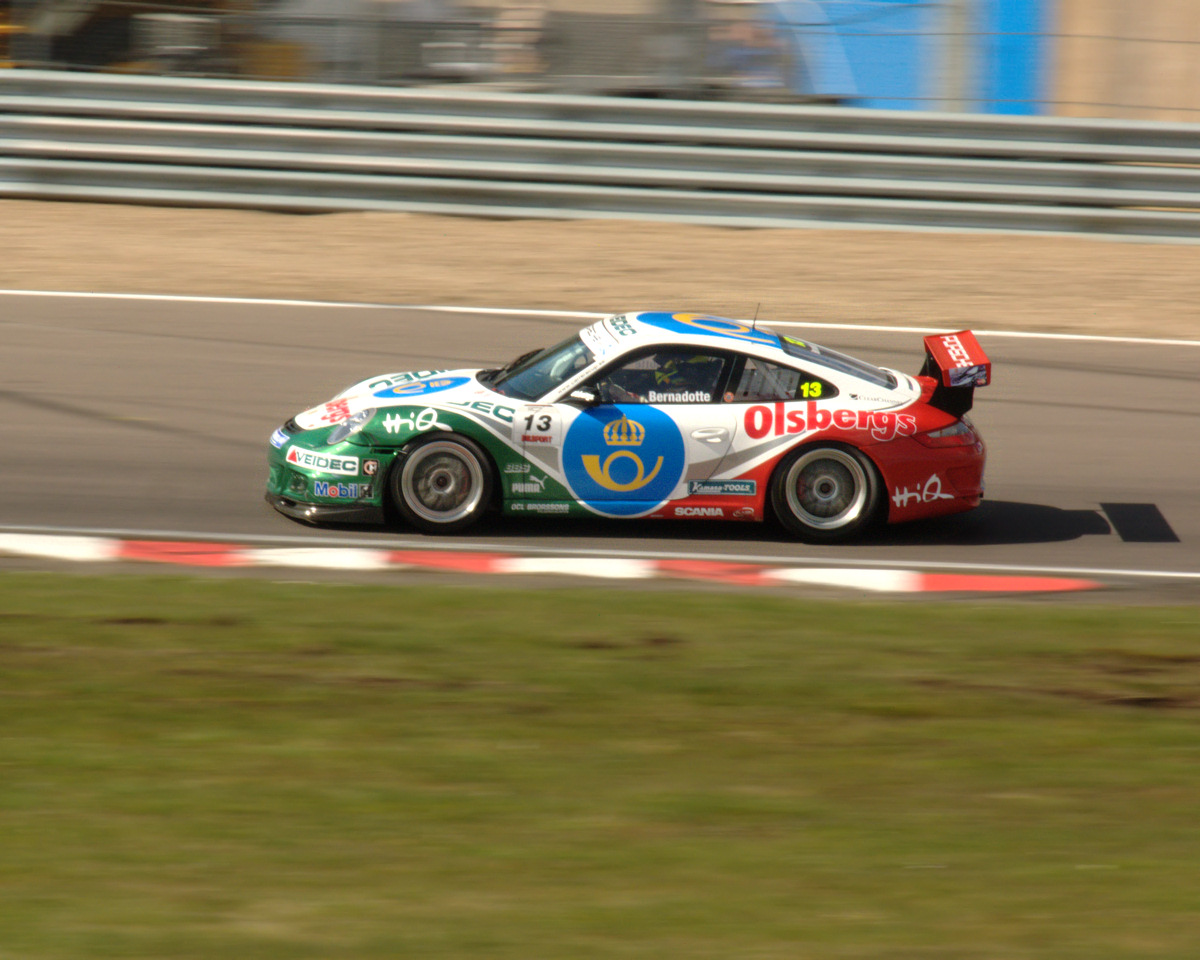
Carl Philip driving a Porsche 911 GT3 Cup

Carl Philip has been a scout and is fond of outdoor life. He is keen on sport and athletics, especially football, swimming, sailing and skiing. In 2003, he completed the historic Swedish "Vasaloppet", the longest cross country ski race in the world. Carl Philip also enjoys car racing, a passion he inherited from his great-uncle and godfather, Prince Bertil, and has a licence to compete. Carl Philip has taken part in the racing series Porsche Carrera Cup Scandinavia in a Porsche 911 GT3. Since 2013 he has raced in the Scandinavian Touring Car Championship.

He completed his military service at the Amphibious Battalion at Vaxholm Coastal Artillery Regiment as a combat boat commander (Combat Boat 90) in the autumn of 2000. In December 2002, Carl Philip was promoted to second lieutenant, and in 2004 to the rank of lieutenant in the Swedish Amphibious Corps. In 2007 and 2008 he went to the Swedish Defence University. The course was divided in three weeks autumn 2007 and three weeks spring 2008. After that course he was appointed captain. On 1 October 2014, Carl Philip achieved the rank of major.

With a great interest for design and drawing, he began studying graphic design in Stockholm in 2003, studies which he continues still. In 2012 he founded Bernadotte & Kylberg with Oscar Kylberg. The company has since designed products for many brands.

== Activities and charity work ==
Carl Philip and Sofia's Foundation was established to mark the occasion of the couple's marriage in 2015. The foundation's purpose is to counteract bullying.

In 2013, the Prince Carl Philip Racing Cup was founded. The racing cup aims to help young people with karting talents progress within the sport. Carl Philip with the Royal Swedish Academy of Engineering Sciences conducts a range of visits to companies, with focus on the companies' creative work.

Carl Philip is a patron of several organizations such as The Swedish National Dyslexia Association, The Swedish Rural Economy and Agricultural Societies, The International Union for Conservation of Nature, The Royal Swedish Motorboat Club and others.

== Personal life ==
=== Bachelorhood ===
Carl Philip dated Emma Pernald from 1999 to 2009. Pernald worked at a PR firm for several years. After the separation, Pernald revealed in the Swedish newspaper Expressen that she and Carl Philip mutually decided to go their separate ways. Pernald made no further comment as to the reason for the break-up.

=== Marriage and family ===
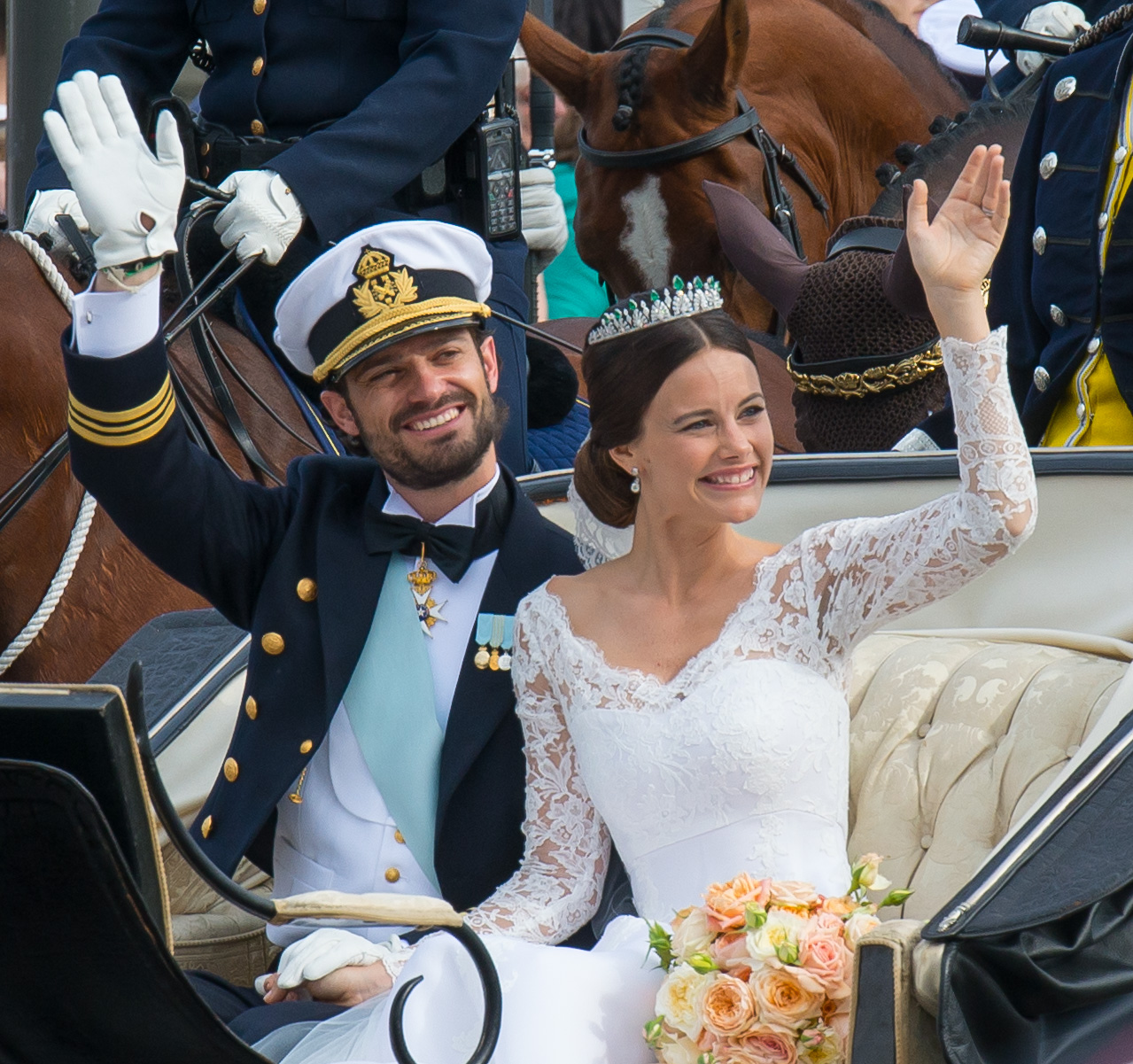
Prince Carl Philip and his wife after their wedding ceremony on 13 June 2015

In April 2010, Carl Philip was linked in the press with former glamour model Sofia Hellqvist. In August 2010, Royal Court spokesperson Nina Eldh confirmed the relationship between Carl Philip and Hellqvist in a statement released by the palace. On 27 June 2014, it was announced that Carl Philip and Hellqvist were engaged.

They married on 13 June 2015 in Stockholm's Royal Palace chapel, and thousands of people lined the streets for the occasion. In an interview he criticized the press for suggesting that Hellqvist was not welcome in the royal family. He told the press that the opposite was true and that his family easily accepted her into the family. He compared the "bullying" of her past to that of himself being bullied for having dyslexia.

The couple was due to move into the Villa Solbacken which had been vacant since the death of Princess Lilian and, while it was being renovated, they lived in Rosendal Palace until 2017.

Carl Philip and Sofia have four children:

- Prince Alexander Erik Hubertus Bertil, Duke of Södermanland, born on 19 April 2016.
- Prince Gabriel Carl Walther, Duke of Dalarna, born on 31 August 2017.
- Prince Julian Herbert Folke, Duke of Halland, born on 26 March 2021.
- Princess Ines Marie Lilian Silvia, Duchess of Västerbotten, born on 7 February 2025.

All four children were born at Danderyd Hospital.

On 7 October 2019, Carl Philip's father, the king, issued a statement rescinding the royal status of Alexander and Gabriel in an effort to more strictly associate Swedish royalty to the office of the head of state; they are still to be styled as princes and dukes of their provinces, and they remain in the line of succession to the throne. Carl Philip and his wife commented that their sons now will have more freedom of choice for their future lives.

== Honours ==
=== National honours ===
- Knight and Commander of the Royal Order of the Seraphim (RoKavKMO)
- Commander of the Royal Order of the Polar Star (KNO)
- Knight of the Royal Order of Charles XIII (RCXIII:sO, not worn as Prince Carl Philip is not a Freemason)
- Recipient of the King Carl XVI Gustaf's Jubilee Commemorative Medal I (30 April 1996)
- Recipient of the Crown Princess Victoria and Prince Daniel's Wedding Commemorative Medal (8 June 2010)
- Recipient of the King Carl XVI Gustaf's Jubilee Commemorative Medal II (23 August 2013)
- Recipient of the King Carl XVI Gustaf's Jubilee Commemorative Medal III (30 April 2016)
- Recipient of the King Carl XVI Gustaf's Jubilee Commemorative Medal IV (15 September 2023)
- Recipient of the Uppland Medal of Merit
- Recipient of the Swedish Armed Forces Conscript Medal
- Recipient of the Swedish National Defence College Commemorative Medal (Försvarshögskolans minnesmedalj)
- Recipient of the Swedish Veterans Federation - Peace Berets Medal of Merit in gold (Fredsbaskrarna Sveriges förtjänstmedalj i guld) (22 January 2013)

=== Foreign honours ===
- Bulgaria: Member 1st Class of the Order of the Balkan Mountains
- Brazil: Grand Cross of the Order of Rio Branco
- Chile: Grand Cross of the Order of Merit
- Estonia: Member 1st Class of the Order of the Cross of Terra Mariana
- Finland: Grand Cross of the Order of the White Rose of Finland
- France: Grand Officer of the Order of the Legion of Honour (30 January 2024)
- Germany: Grand Cross 1st class of the Order of Merit of the Federal Republic of Germany
- Greece: Grand Cross of the Order of Honour
- Iceland: Grand Cross of the Order of the Falcon
- Italy: Knight Grand Cross of the Order of Merit of the Italian Republic (2 November 2018)
- Japan: Grand Cordon of the Supreme Order of the Chrysanthemum
- Jordan: Grand Cordon of the Order of the Star of Jordan
- Latvia: Grand Officer of the Order of the Three Stars
- Luxembourg: Grand Cross of the Order of Adolphe of Nassau
- Malaysia: Honorary Commander of the Order of Loyalty to the Crown of Malaysia (2005)
- Netherlands: Grand Cross of the Order of the Crown (11 October 2022)
- Norway: Grand Cross of the Order of St. Olav (1 September 2005)
- Romania: Grand Cross of the Order of Faithful Service
- Spain: Knight Grand Cross of the Order of Civil Merit (16 November 2021)
- Tunisia: Grand Officer of the National Order of Merit

=== Military ranks ===
- (Sweden) December 2002: Second Lieutenant
- (Sweden) 14 December 2004: Lieutenant
- (Sweden) December 2007: Captain
- (Sweden) 1 October 2014: Major

== Arms ==
Coat of arms

Monogram

Prince Carl Philip's coat of arms is based on the greater coat of arms of Sweden. It features in the first and fourth quarters, the Three Crowns; in the second, the lion of the House of Bjälbo; and in the third, the eagle of the arms of Värmland, representing the titular designation of his dukedom. In the centre, on an inescutcheon, is the dynastic arms of the House of Bernadotte. Surrounding the shield is the chain of the Order of the Seraphim.

Prince Carl Philip, Duke of Värmland House of Bernadotte Born: 13 May 1979
Swedish royalty
Vacant Title last held by Carl Gustaf	Crown Prince of Sweden; 1979	Succeeded by Victoria as Crown Princess
Vacant Title last held by Gustaf	Duke of Värmland; 1979–present	Incumbent
Lines of succession
Preceded by Prince Oscar	Succession to the Swedish throne 4th in line	Followed by Prince Alexander
