= Prince Oscar, Duke of Skåne =

Swedish prince (born 2016)

Prince Oscar
- Duke of Skåne
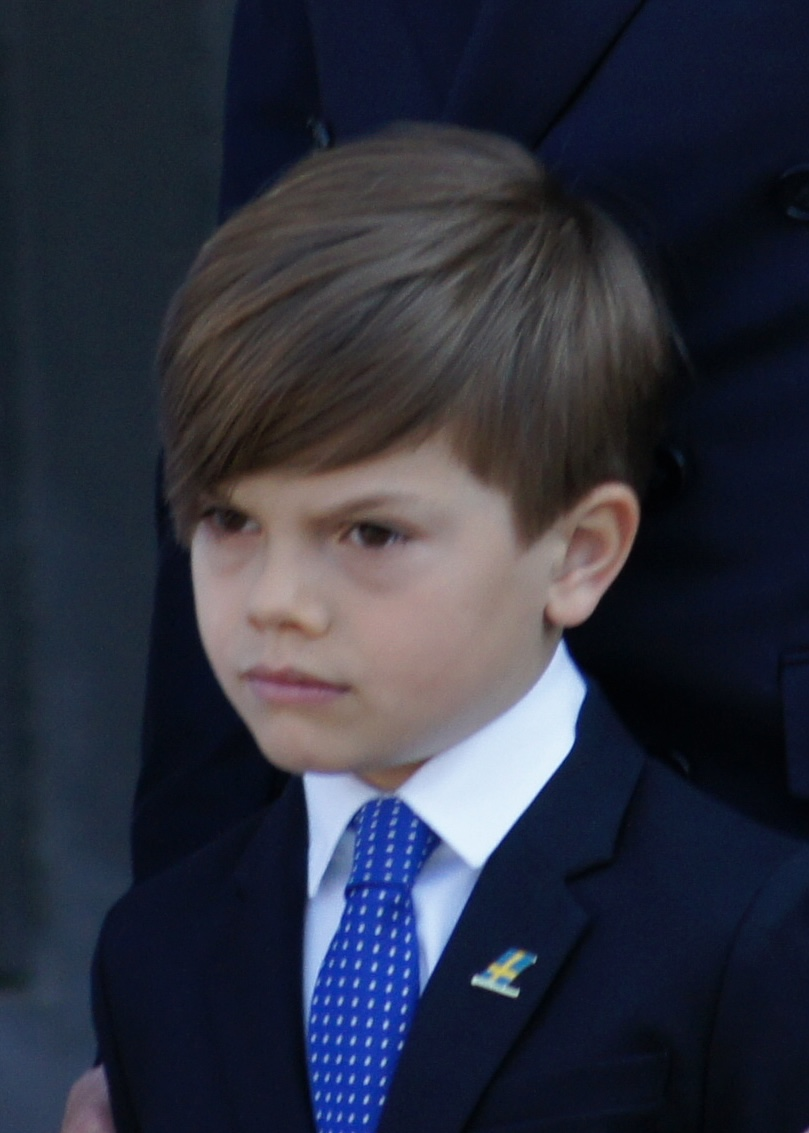
- Prince Oscar in 2023
- Born: 2 March 2016 (age 10); Karolinska University Hospital, Solna, Sweden
Names
- Oscar Carl Olof
- House: Bernadotte
- Father: Daniel Westling
- Mother: Victoria, Crown Princess of Sweden

Prince Oscar of Sweden, Duke of Skåne (Oscar Carl Olof; born 2 March 2016) is the younger child and only son of Crown Princess Victoria and her husband, Prince Daniel. He is a grandson of King Carl XVI Gustaf and Queen Silvia and is third in the line of succession to the Swedish throne, after his mother and his sister, Princess Estelle.

== Birth ==
Prince Oscar was born on 2 March 2016 at Karolinska University Hospital in Solna. His birth was greeted by two 21-gun salutes on the island of Skeppsholmen, opposite Stockholm Palace. His names and title of Duke of Skåne were announced the following day by his maternal grandfather, the King.

A Te Deum thanksgiving service was held in the palace's Royal Chapel on 3 March 2016 to celebrate his birth.

Prince Oscar was christened on 27 May 2016 at the Royal Chapel of Stockholm Palace in Stockholm, Sweden. His godparents are King Frederik X of Denmark (then Crown Prince); Queen Mette-Marit of Norway (then Crown Princess); his maternal aunt Princess Madeleine of Sweden; his mother's cousin Oscar Magnuson; and his father's cousin Hans Åström. He was christened in the family's antique christening gown which was first worn by his great grandfather Prince Gustaf Adolf when he was christened in 1906. His name and date of christening were added in embroidery to the gown.

== Honours and arms ==
- Knight and Commander of the Royal Order of the Seraphim
- Knight of the Order of Charles XIII
- Recipient of the Commemorative Golden Jubilee Medal of His Majesty The King (CXVIG:sJmtIV)

=== Arms ===
Monogram

Prince Oscar's coat of arms is based on the greater coat of arms of Sweden. It features in the first and fourth quarters, the Three Crowns; in the second, the lion of the House of Bjälbo; and in the third, the griffin of the arms of Skåne, representing the titular designation of his dukedom. In the centre, on an inescutcheon, is the dynastic arms of the House of Bernadotte. Surrounding the shield is the chain of the Order of the Seraphim, of which he was presented with at his baptism.

Prince Oscar, Duke of Skåne House of Bernadotte Born: 2 March 2016
Swedish royalty
Vacant Title last held by Gustaf VI Adolf	Duke of Skåne; 2016–present	Incumbent
Lines of succession
Preceded by Princess Estelle	Succession to the Swedish throne 3rd in line	Followed by Prince Carl Philip
