= Swedish Royal Jubilee Commemorative Medals =

Medals given in celebrations of the royal family of Sweden

The Kingdom of Sweden has a long history of awarding royal commemorative insignia. The oldest is the medal awarded to the godparents of Crown Prince Gustav Adolf in 1778. The majority of these medals celebrate birthdays, jubilees, coronations, and weddings within the royal family of Sweden.

Royal commemorative medals are categorized in to Category C in the Swedish order of wear, meaning they are worn after the Royal Order of the Seraphim and all war decorations.

== Medals ==
Photo	Abbreviation	Name	Ribbon	Instituted	Comments	Notes
		Gustav III's Godparent Insignia for Crown Prince Gustaf Adolfs Baptism	Gold chain	10 November 1778	Gustav III:s faddertecken vid kronprinsen Gustaf Adolfs dop was a commemorative insignia awarded by Gustav III to the 45 godparents of his son Crown Prince Gustav Adolf.	
	OII:sJmt	King Oscar II's Jubilee Commemorative Medal		18 September 1897	The Konung Oscar II:s jubileumsminnestecken was made to commemorate 25 years of Oscar II's reign. Made in three different versions: 232 medals in silver with the king's gilded left profile on a background of light blue enamel suspended by the Seraphim ribbon and was presented to royal family members, foreign guests, and executives of certain rank at the Royal Court; 268 in silver with king's profile in silver on a background of dark blue enamel worn on the dark blue ribbon of H. M. The King's Medal; 49 medals of gilded silver with a gilded profile of the king on a background of red enamel worn on a red-violet ribbon and was awarded to higher officials of the Norwegian Court.	
	GV:sbm	Crown Prince Gustaf V and Crown Princess Victoria's Silver Wedding Medal		20 September 1906	The Kronprins Gustafs (V) och Kronprinsessan Victorias silverbröllopsmedalj was created to recognize the silver wedding anniversary of Crown Prince Gustaf and Crown Princess Victoria	
	OII:sGbmt	King Oscar II and Queen Sofia's Golden Wedding Medal		6 June 1907	The Konung Oscar II:s och Drottning Sofias guldbröllopsminnestecken was created to commemorate King Oscar II and Queen Sophia's golden wedding anniversary on 6 June 1907. The 460 of the Royal commemorative badges was awarded to members of the royal family and court officials. The badge was designed by the royal couple's youngest son, Prince Eugen.	
	GV:sJmt	King Gustaf V's Jubilee Commemorative Medal (1928)		25 May 1928	The Konung Gustaf V:s jubileumsminnestecken was made for the occasion of the King's 70th birthday. 950 were awarded to the royal family, the royal court, guests and those who contributed to the anniversary collection.	
	GV:sJmtII	King Gustaf V's Jubilee Commemorative Medal (1948)		21 May 1948	Konung Gustaf V:s jubileumsminnestecken II made in commemoration of King Gustaf V's 90th birthday, 16 June 1948. 800 were awarded.	
	GV:sMt	King Gustaf V's Commemorative Medal		16 February 1951	Konung Gustav V:s minnestecken was awarded to 303 members of the deceased king's royal court and personal staff.	
	GVIA:sMM	King Gustaf VI Adolf's Commemorative Medal		29 August 1967	Konung Gustav VI Adolfs minnesmedalj was awarded to 650 individuals in commemoration of the king's 85th birthday.	
	CXVIG:sJmt	King Carl XVI Gustaf's Jubilee Commemorative Medal		30 April 1996	The Konung Carl XVI Gustafs jubileumsminnestecken was awarded to commemorate the 50th birthday of King Carl XVI Gustaf.	
	VD:sBMM	Crown Princess Victoria and Prince Daniel's Wedding Commemorative Medal		8 June 2010	The Kronprinsessan Victorias och Prins Daniels bröllopsminnesmedalj is a commemorative medal to mark the wedding of Crown Princess Victoria and Daniel Westling on 19 June 2010.	
	CXVIG:sJmtII	King Carl XVI Gustaf's Jubilee Commemorative Medal II		23 August 2013	477 of the Konung Carl XVI Gustafs jubileumsminnestecken II were awarded to members of the royal family, royal, and other guests present at the Te Deum in the Royal Chapel 15 September 2013 in commemoration of the King's 40th anniversary of ascending the throne. It was also awarded to employees at the Royal Court.	
	CXVIG:sJmtIII	King Carl XVI Gustaf's Jubilee Commemorative Medal III		30 April 2016	Awarded to members of the royal family, royal, and other guests present at the Te Deum in the Royal Chapel 30 April 2016 in celebration of the King's 70th birthday. It was also awarded to employees at the Royal Court.	
	CXVIG:sJmtIV	King Carl XVI Gustaf's Jubilee Commemorative Medal IV		15 September 2023	695 awarded to members of the royal family, royal, and other guests present at the Te Deum in the Royal Chapel 15 September 2023 in commemoration of the King's 50th anniversary of ascending the throne. It was also awarded to employees at the Royal Court.	
	CXVIGSGbmt	King Carl XVI Gustaf and Queen Silvia's Golden Wedding Medal		13 June 2026	The Konung Carl XVI Gustaf:s och Drottning Silvias guldbröllopsminnestecken was created to commemorate King Carl XVI Gustaf and Queen Silvia's golden wedding anniversary on 19 June 1976. The medal is inspired by King Oscar II and Queen Sofia's golden wedding commemorative sign from 1907. It was designed by acting councilor Kim Dohm-Hansen based on an idea and sketch by the intendent of the Royal Orders of Knighthood Christian Thorén. About 870 awarded.	
