= Succession to the Swedish throne =

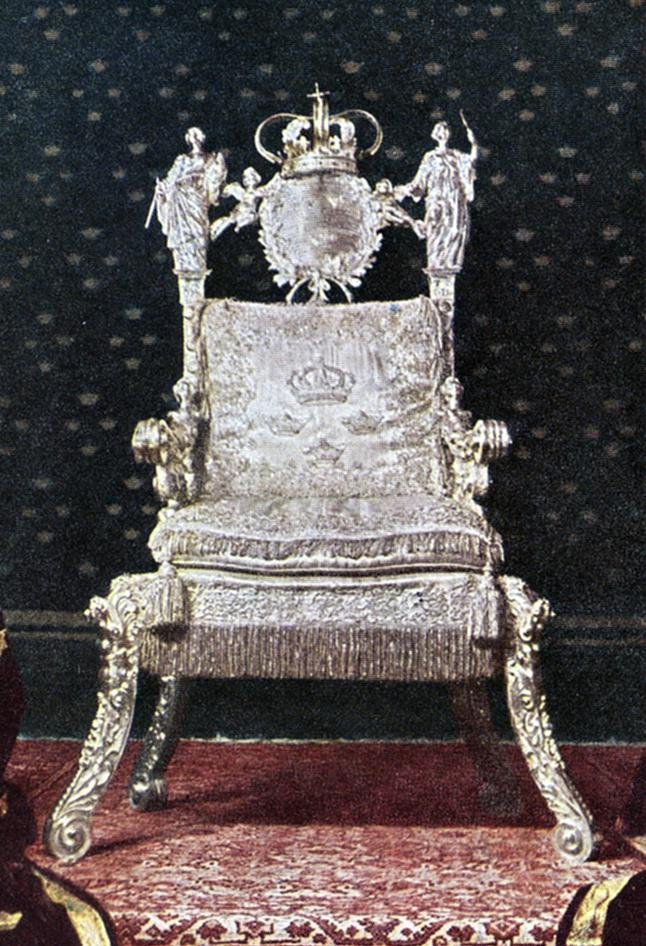
The Silver Throne, used by Swedish monarchs since 1650

The line of succession to the Swedish throne is determined by the Act of Succession (Swedish: successionsordningen), originally approved jointly by the Riksdag of the Estates assembled in Örebro and King Charles XIII in 1810.

In 1979, the Riksdag introduced absolute primogeniture, meaning that the eldest child of the monarch, regardless of gender, is first in the line of succession. The change entered into force on 1 January 1980, making Sweden the first country to adopt absolute primogeniture. The Swedish crown had previously (since 1810) descended according to agnatic primogeniture, meaning that only males could inherit it. Though the change took effect in 1980, its application was backdated so that Crown Princess Victoria, who was born in 1977, became the first in line of succession, replacing her brother, Prince Carl Philip, who was born in 1979.

== Line of succession ==
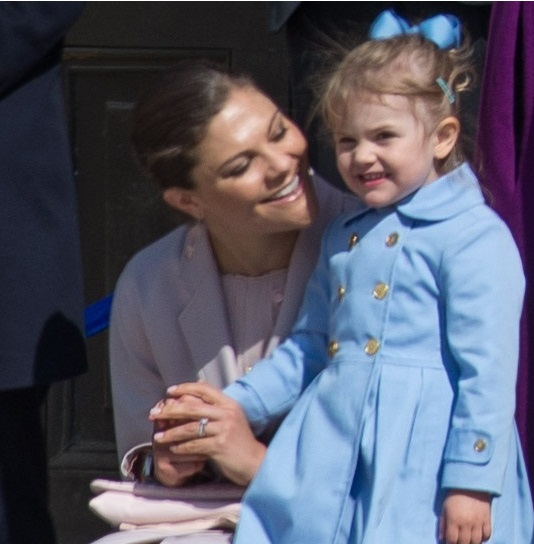
Crown Princess Victoria and her daughter, Princess Estelle, are first and second in line to the throne, respectively.

- King Carl XVI Gustaf (born 1946)
  - (1) Crown Princess Victoria, Duchess of Västergötland (born 1977)
    - (2) Princess Estelle, Duchess of Östergötland (born 2012)
    - (3) Prince Oscar, Duke of Skåne (born 2016)
  - (4) Prince Carl Philip, Duke of Värmland (born 1979)
    - (5) Prince Alexander, Duke of Södermanland (born 2016)
    - (6) Prince Gabriel, Duke of Dalarna (born 2017)
    - (7) Prince Julian, Duke of Halland (born 2021)
    - (8) Princess Ines, Duchess of Västerbotten (born 2025)
  - (9) Princess Madeleine, Duchess of Hälsingland and Gästrikland (born 1982)
    - (10) Princess Leonore, Duchess of Gotland (born 2014)
    - (11) Prince Nicolas, Duke of Ångermanland (born 2015)
    - (12) Princess Adrienne, Duchess of Blekinge (born 2018)

== Eligibility ==
According to more recent adjustments (than 1810) to the Act of Succession, only King Carl XVI Gustaf's Lutheran legitimate descendants brought up in Sweden are presently entitled to succeed. Succession rights are lost when a person:

- is not brought up in Sweden
- ceases to be a Lutheran as defined in the Unaltered Augsburg Confession and the Uppsala Synod of 1593, i.e. by implication the Church of Sweden (Article 4)
- marries without the consent of the Government (Article 5) or
- ascends the throne of another state by election, inheritance or marriage without the consent of the monarch and the Riksdag (Article 8)

== See also ==
- List of Swedish monarchs
