= Inescutcheon =

Heraldic charge

The royal arms of Spain, showing the arms of Bourbon en surtout

Arms of the Duke of Ormond, with an escutcheon of pretence (showing the arms of the duke's wife, who was the daughter and heiress of the Earl of Desmond)

In heraldry, an inescutcheon is a small shield that is used to display a secondary coat of arms over a primary one. A secondary coat borne in this manner is said to be en surtout (from the French surtout, "centrepiece"). Unless otherwise specified, inescutcheons appear at the fess point. They are often used by rulers to combine dynastic coats with territorial ones. The royal arms of Spain, for instance, include an inescutcheon bearing the arms of the ruling Bourbon dynasty.

In British heraldry, it is customary for a man who marries an heiress to place his wife's arms in an inescutcheon, described as an "escutcheon of pretence" (because the husband is "pretending" to the headship of his wife's family). If the wife is a peeress, the inescutcheon may be surmounted by the appropriate coronet. Inescutcheons may also be used by baronets to display their badges. More rarely, they may be used to display augmentations. The arms of the Duke of Wellington, for instance, include an inescutcheon displaying a Union Jack, granted in 1813.

The term "inescutcheon" may also be used to describe a shield that serves merely as a charge, especially if it appears singly. When several shields appear in a blazon, the term "escutcheon" is more commonly employed.
