= Golden Jubilee of Carl XVI Gustaf =

50th anniversary of the Swedish monarch's accession

- Native name: Carl XVI Gustafs 50-årsjubileum som regent
- Date: 15 September 2023
- Location: Kingdom of Sweden
- Type: Golden Jubilee

The Golden Jubilee of Carl XVI Gustaf (Swedish: Carl XVI Gustafs 50-årsjubileum som regent) was celebrated in 2023 in the Kingdom of Sweden, to mark the 50th anniversary of the accession of King Carl XVI Gustaf on 15 September 1973. He is the first Swedish monarch to celebrate a Golden Jubilee. The 500th anniversary of Sweden's regained independence, through the election of King Gustav I, was also marked during the Jubilee year.

A number of events were planned to mark the Jubilee in several places across Sweden throughout the year.

== Emblem ==
During the spring of 2022, the Royal Court of Sweden launched a competition, aimed at students in graphic design, to come up with a symbol for the Jubilee year. The winner of the competition was Elis Nyström, a student at the Royal Institute of Technology.

The emblem consists of different geometric shapes. The green stone symbolizes the King's interest in nature, the blue for the Baltic Sea, purple is a common royal colour and the red stone is also found in the royal crown. Nyström said that the geometric shapes should also be "associated with confetti, which fits well when we have a celebration ahead of us".

== Celebrations ==
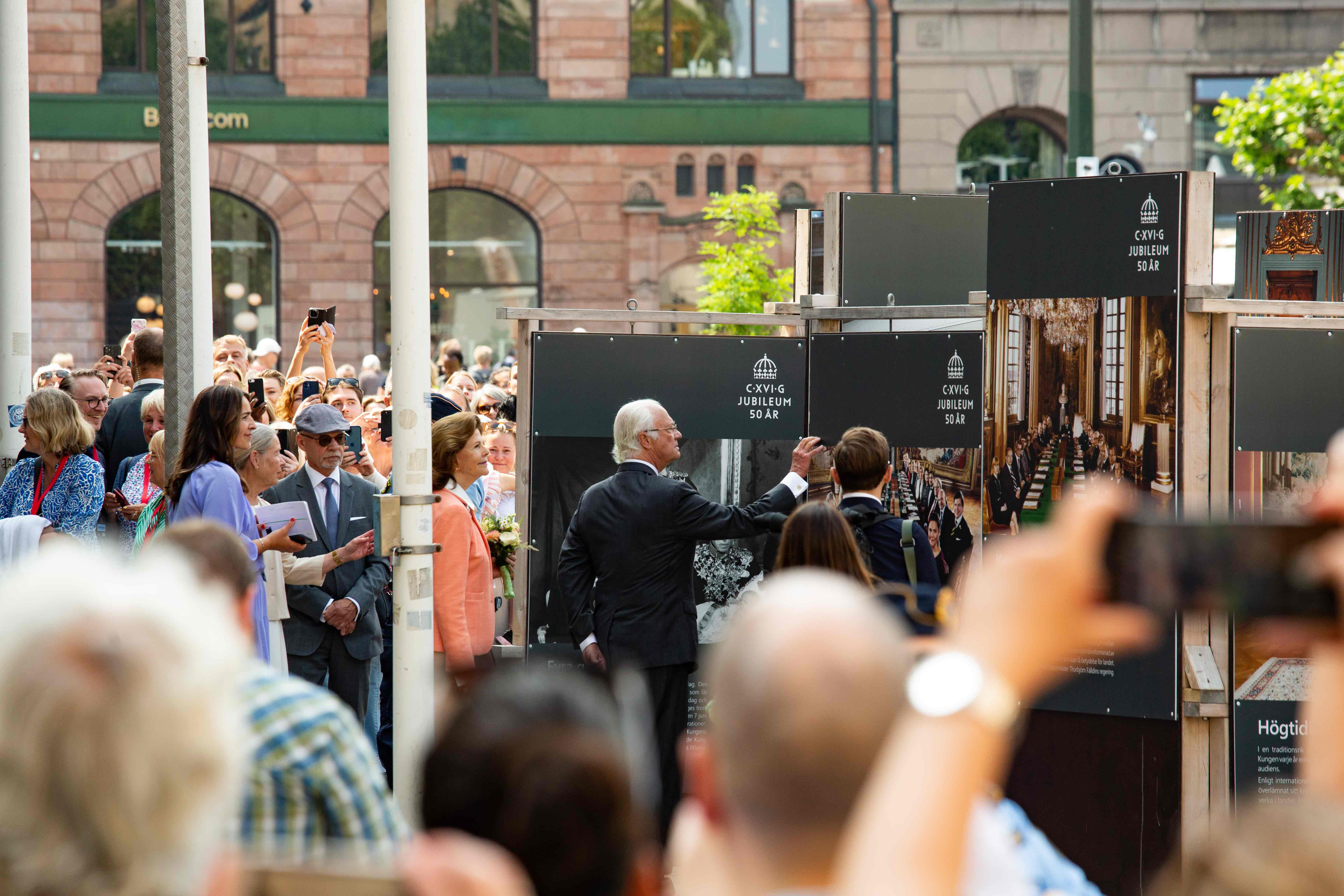
Carl XVI Gustaf

On January 1, the King's official jubilee portrait was released by the court to mark the start of the Jubilee Year. The photograph taken by Thron Ullberg in the Hall of State at Stockholm Palace shows the King in front of Queen Christina's silver throne wearing an admiral's uniform. Additionally, the King wears the collars of the royal orders of the Seraphim, Sword, North Star, and Vasa, alongside the stars of the Seraphim and Vasa orders, the Grand Commander insignia of the Dannebrog Order around his neck, and royal Swedish and Norwegian commemorative medals.

The celebrations began on January 20 when the King held at Sweden Banquet at the Royal Palace. In February, he began his tour of Sweden which would last until September 7. During the tour, he would visit the capitals of all Sweden's 21 counties. The visits are listed below:

- Nyköping, February 9
- Jönköping, February 16
- Västerås, March 9
- Luleå, March 30
- Östersund, April 3
- Karlskrona, April 20
- Uppsala, April 27
- Härnösand, May 8
- Örebro, 12 May
- Kalmar, May 16
- Linköping, May 25
- Växjö, May 31
- Gothenburg, June 4
- Visby, June 14
- Malmö, June 20
- Stockholm, June 22
- Falun, August 17
- Gävle, August 21
- Halmstad, August 24
- Umeå, August 31
- Karlstad, September 7

On June 6, 2023, marking the 500th anniversary of Gustav Vasa's election as king of Sweden, the King and Queen began National Day celebrations in Strängnäs and returned to Stockholm later in the day. The National Day celebration at Skansen were more extensive to mark the Jubilee but included the traditional elements such as the royal procession, the flag raising, the Kings speech and the concert. In the evening, the King hosted a grand National Day reception for representatives of Sweden and the diplomatic corps of some countries around the world at the Nordic Museum. Prime Minister Ulf Kristersson also released a speech to mark the national anniversary.

=== September 15 ===
On the 50th anniversary of the accession of King Carl XVI Gustaf, following the death of his grandfather King Gustaf VI Adolf as king of Sweden on 15 September 1973, the day began with a "Te Deum" in the palace church. The service was led by Bishop Johan Dalman, chief court preacher, and court congregation pastor Michael Bjerkhagen. Attendee’s of the service were awarded the Golden Jubilee commemorative medal.

After the service in the Palace church, the Stockholm Amphibious Regiment fired a gun salute at 12:00 local time from Skeppsholmen. A changing of the guard was subsequently carried out where the Life Squadron of the Life Guard replaced the Life Company of the Life Guard, in the presence of Carl XVI Gustaf and his son, Prince Carl Philip of Sweden. After the changing of the guard, the Royal Academy of Music organized, in collaboration with Sjungande Barn, a singer's tribute to HM the King. Around 130 singers from all over Sweden participated.

In the afternoon, Swedish television and radio broadcast His Majesty the King's anniversary speech to the people of the Kingdom of Sweden. During the speech the King said that he wanted to continue to serve Sweden and finished by saying his royal motto: For Sweden-With the times

An anniversary banquet was later held in Rikssalen at the Palace. Guests include foreign royal guests, heads of state, and representatives from various parts of Sweden. The King and Crown Princess Victoria both delivered speeches during the banquet.

During the day the Royal Cemetery was also kept open so that the public had the opportunity to visit the tomb of King Gustaf VI Adolf.

=== September 16 ===
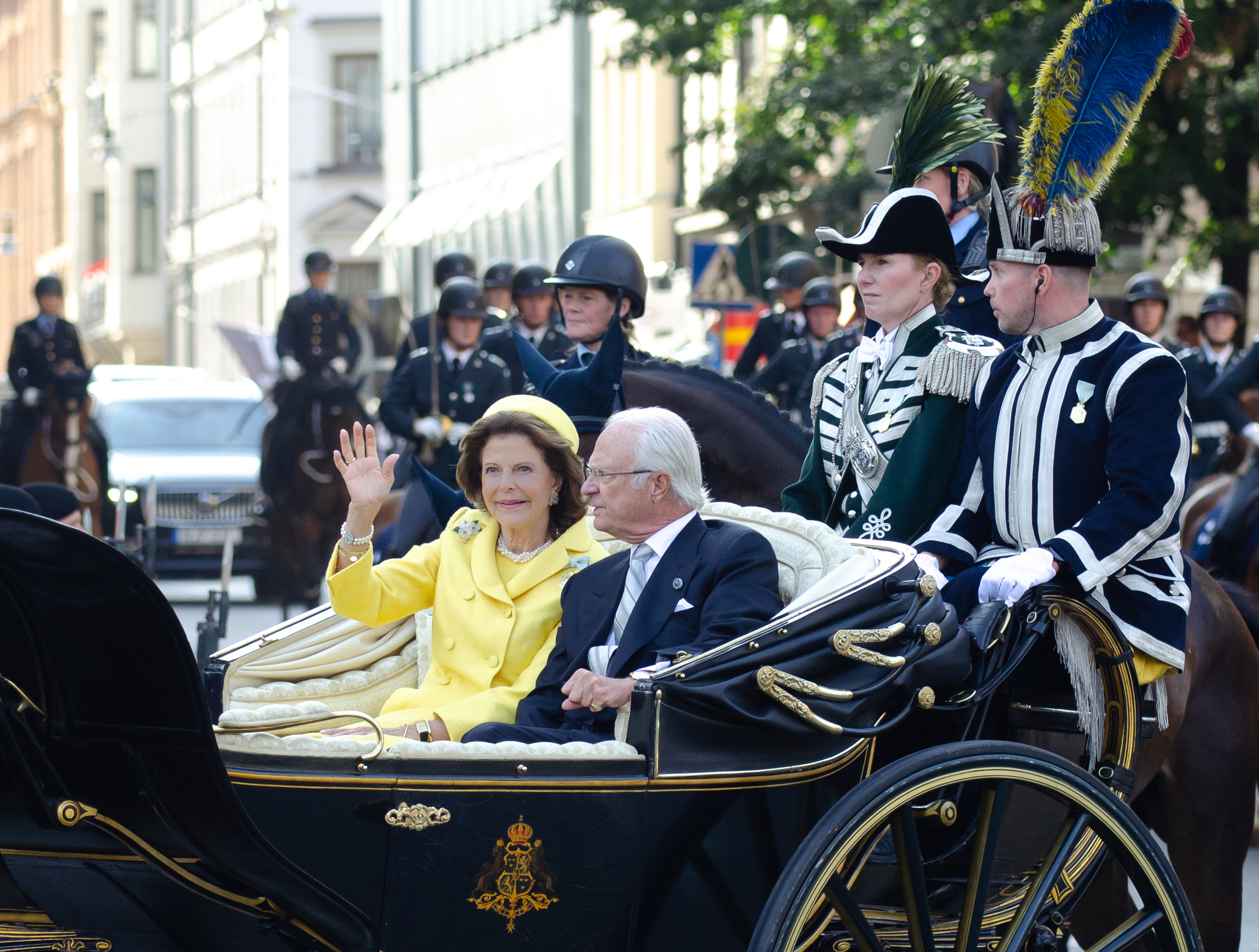
The King and Queen in a carriage

During the day the King and Queen traveled in a procession through the center of Stockholm along a rout guarded by the military. The procession ended with the royal couple traveling on the royal barge Vasaorden past Kastellholmen, across the Stockholm Creek to the lower Logårdstrappan from which they walked to the Royal Palace. After the procession, a flyover took place over the Royal Palace.

The city of Stockholm organized a jubilee concert at Norrbro in honor of HM the King. Several Swedish artists performed during the concert.

=== Flag Day ===
In May 2023, the Kristersson government submitted proposals to amend the regulation (1982:279) on public flag days to introduce a temporary flag day on September 15, 2023, due to the anniversary. The bill was passed by the Riksdag on June 21 with 282 votes in favor and 21 against (only the Left Party was against). The new flag day was formalized with the government meeting on July 6, 2023.

== Guests ==
The main festivities on 14–15 September 2023 were attended by members of the Swedish royal family, members of foreign royal families and heads of state.

=== Swedish royal family ===
- The King and Queen
  - The Crown Princess and the Duke of Västergötland, the King's daughter and son-in-law
    - The Duchess of Östergötland, the King's granddaughter
    - The Duke of Skåne, the King's grandson
  - The Duke and Duchess of Värmland, the King's son and daughter-in-law
    - The Duke of Södermanland, the King's grandson
    - The Duke of Dalarna, the King's grandson
  - The Duchess of Hälsingland and Gästrikland and Mr Christopher O'Neill, the King's daughter and son-in-law
- Princess Christina, Mrs Magnuson, and Mr Tord Magnuson, the King's sister and brother-in-law
- Count Michael Bernadotte af Wisborg, the King's first cousin
- Count Bertil af Wisborg and Countess Jill Bernadotte of Wisborg, the King's second cousin once removed and his wife

=== Other royalty ===
- The Queen of Denmark, the King's first cousin
  - The Crown Prince and Crown Princess of Denmark, the King's first cousin once removed and his wife
- Queen Anne-Marie of the Hellenes, the King's first cousin
- The King and Queen of Norway, the King's second cousin once removed and his wife
  - The Crown Prince of Norway, the King's third cousin

=== Foreign dignitaries ===
- Sauli Niinistö, President of the Republic of Finland, and Jenni Haukio
- Guðni Th. Jóhannesson, President of Iceland, and Eliza Reid

== Exhibitions ==
During the year, a number of exhibitions will be held at royal residences to mark the Jubilee.

One of the jubilee exhibitions will highlight unique objects that are important to the history of Sweden. The objects show how court culture contributed to Sweden’s development and the formation of the country of Sweden in its current form. The exhibition encompasses the establishment of a Swedish central government, the Age of Greatness, academies, parliamentary power, international influences, art collections, and a commitment to the environment.

This photographic exhibition celebrates 50 years during which The King has served as Swedish Head of State. It includes official portraits. The photographs also show five decades of Sweden as a nation. They also show the continuity that The King has brought in his role as the longest-reigning monarch in Sweden's history.

== Popular culture ==
On February 24, 2023, the film The King made by documentarist Karin af Klintberg was released. Klintberg also created the documentary series Kungen och jag, which aired in three episodes on SVT starting on September 3.

=== Criticism ===
Leading up to the jubilee year and including it, beginning already in 2018, some of the most serious criticism ever published took place about King Carl XVI Gustaf and the way his monarchy has developed.

== Gallery ==
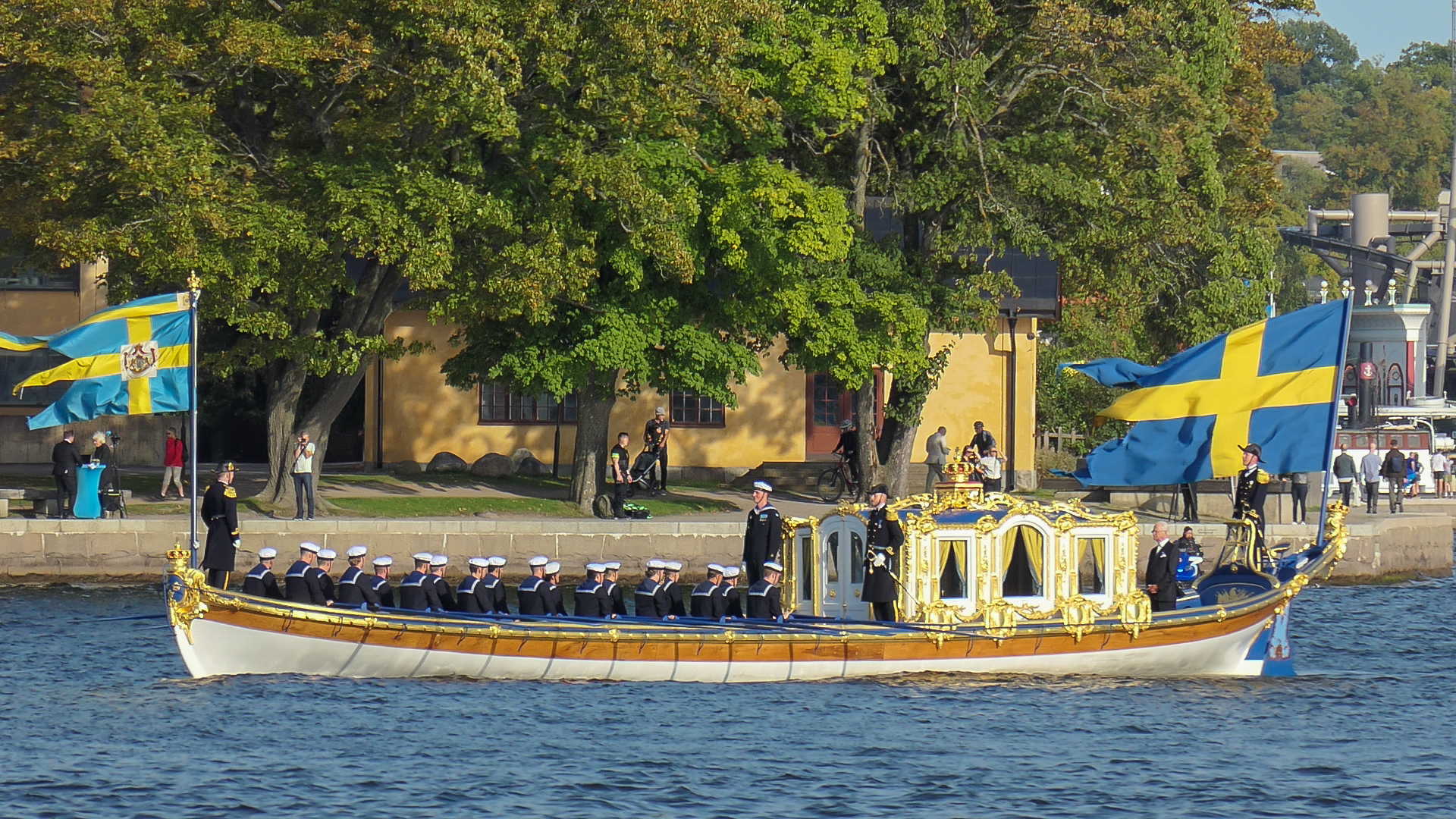
The Royal Sloop Vasaorden at the jubilee

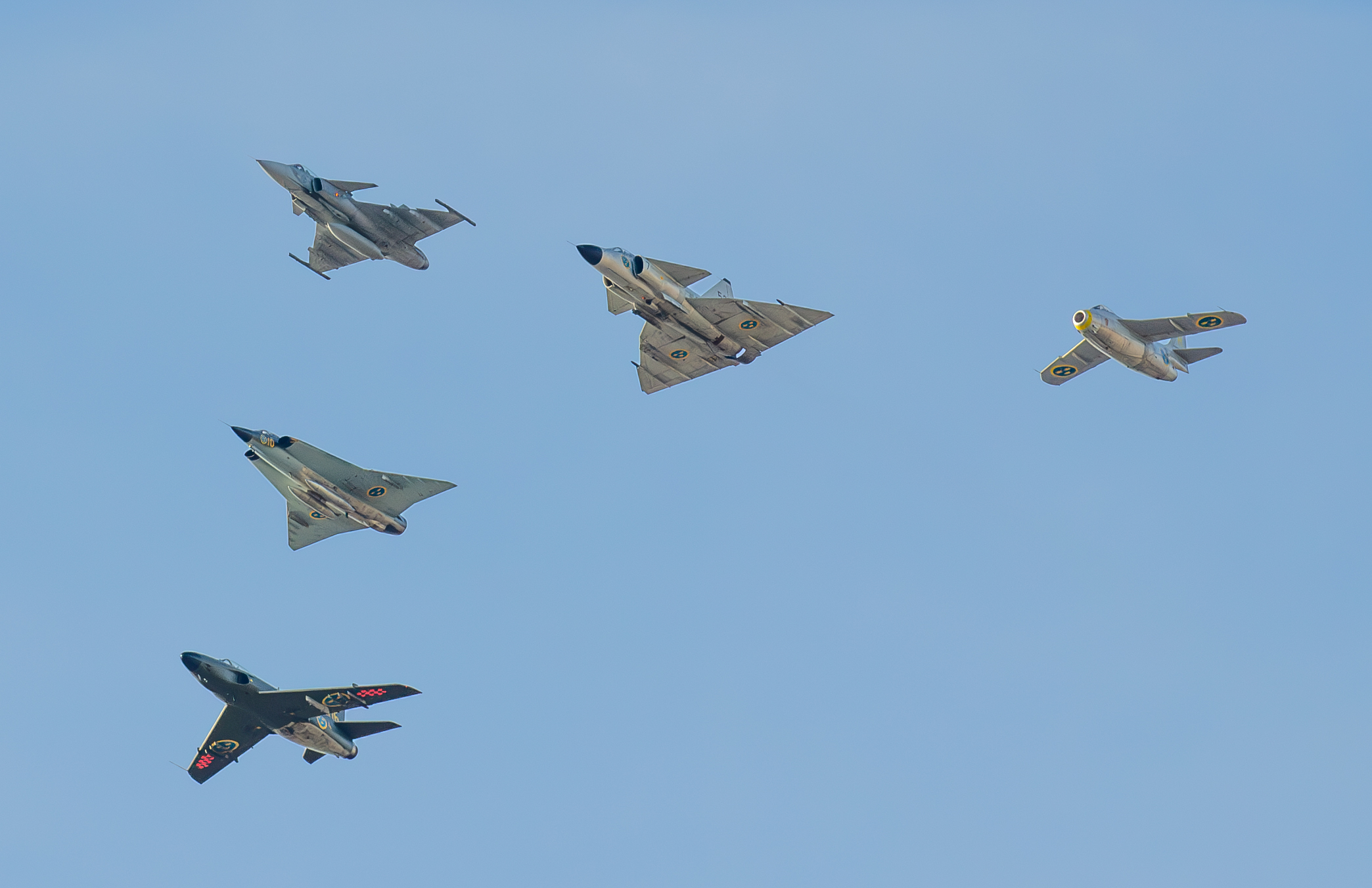
Flyover at the Palace

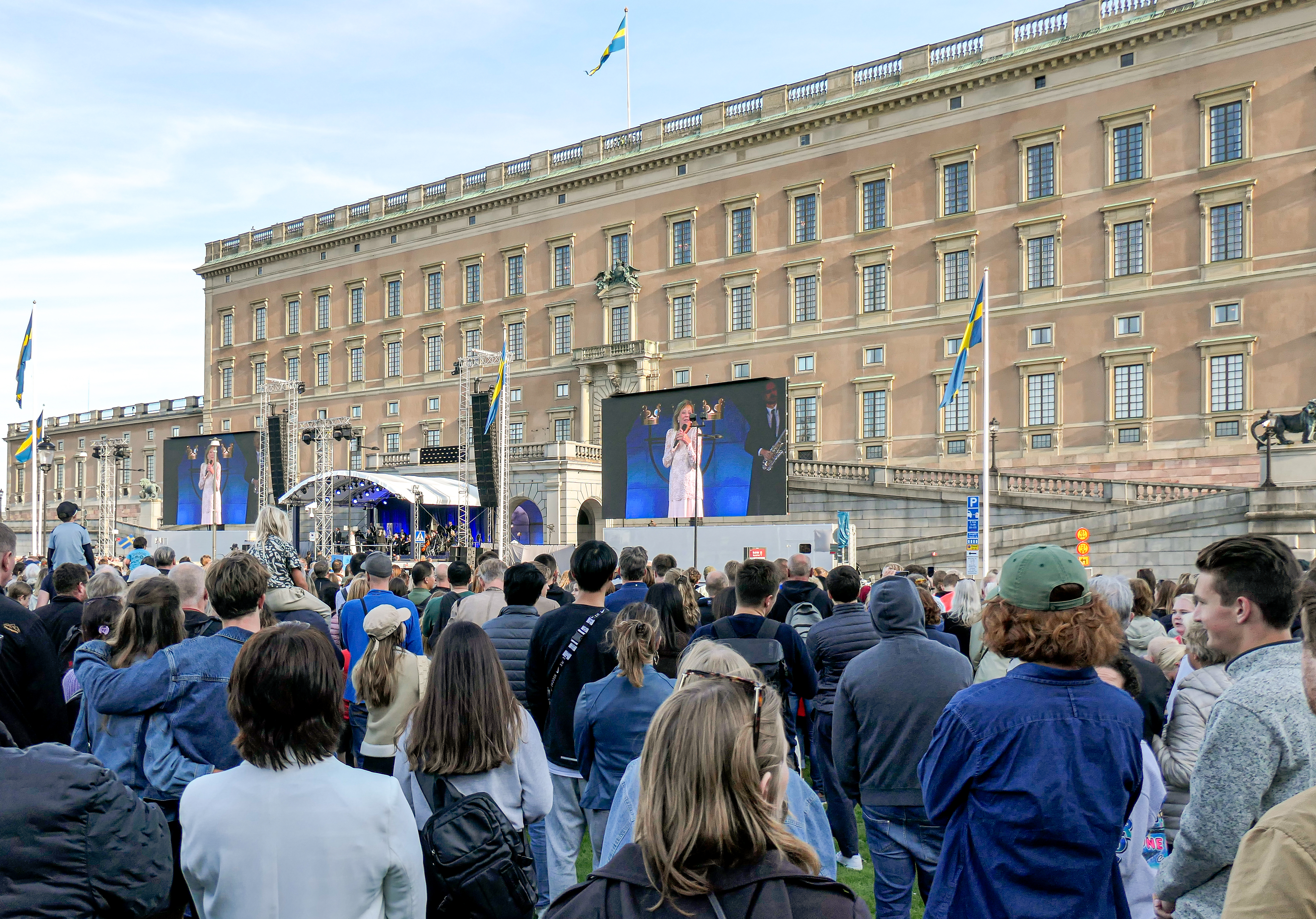
Jubilee concert at the Palace

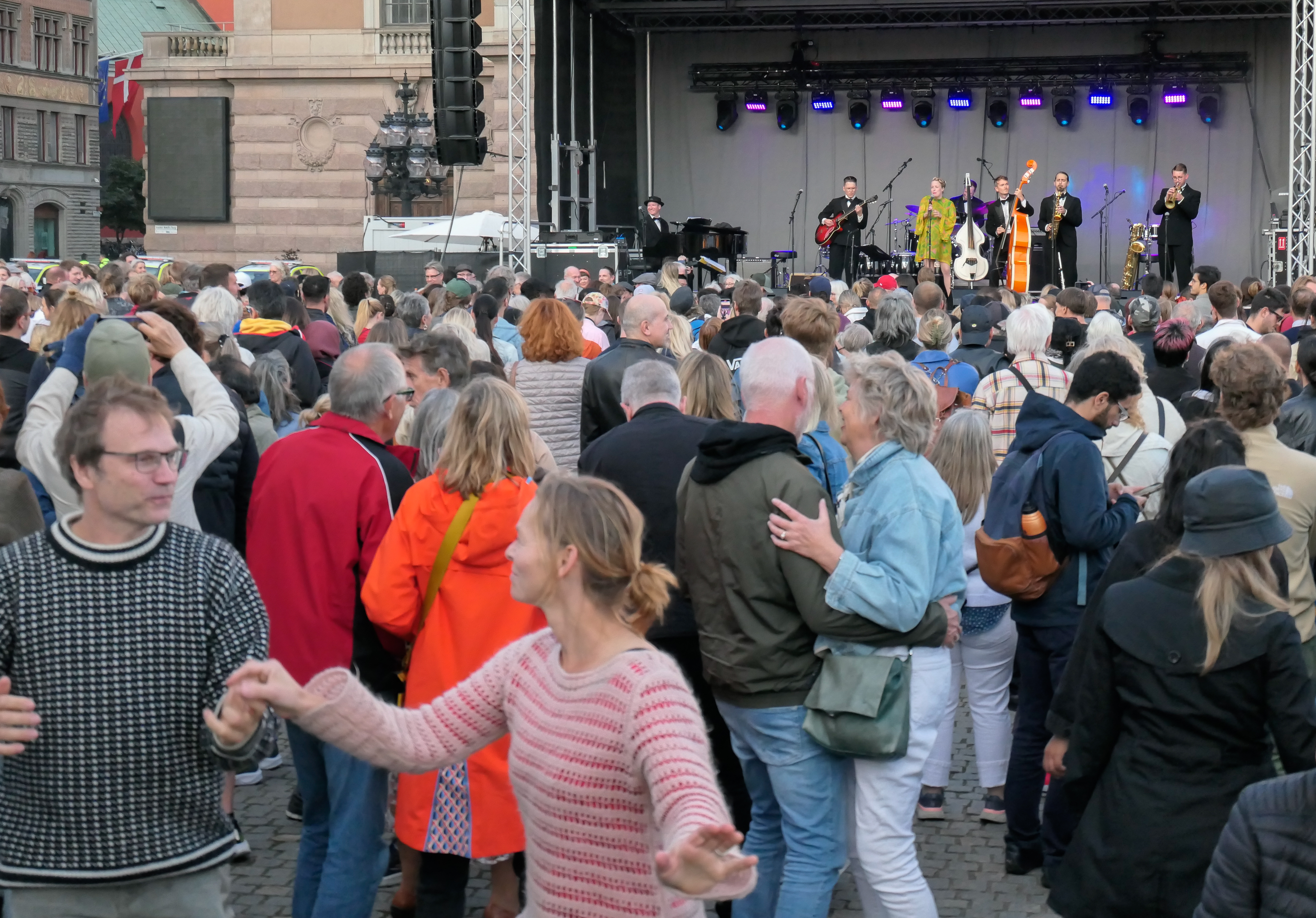
Public celebrations at Gustaf Adolfs Square

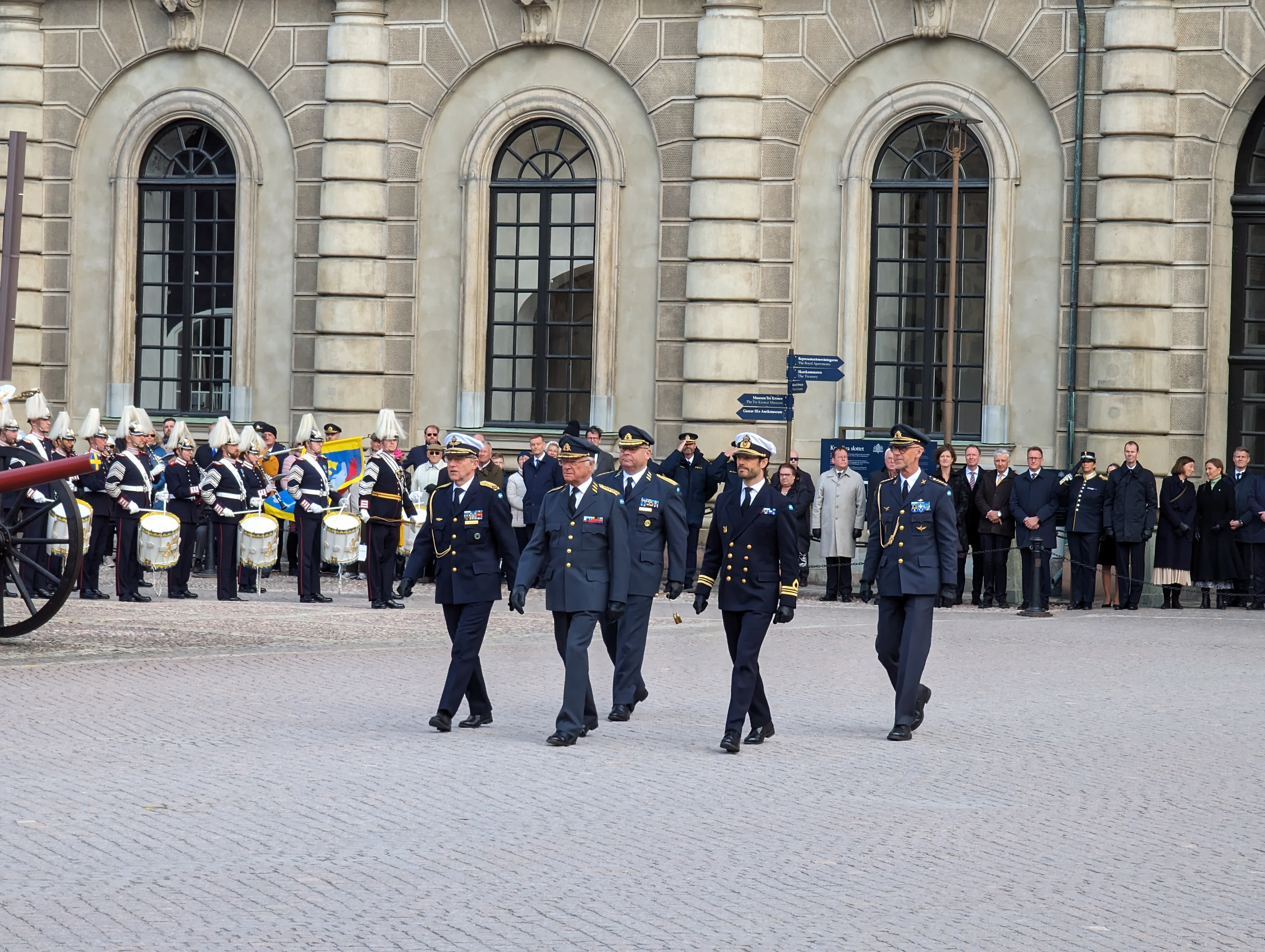
Changing of the Guard to mark the King's birthday during the jubilee year

== See also ==
- Golden Jubilee of Victoria
- Golden Jubilee of Elizabeth II
- Golden Jubilee of Margrethe II
