= King's Golden Jubilee =

King's Golden Jubilee may refer to:

- Golden Jubilee of George III in 1809
- Golden Jubilee of Carl XVI Gustaf in 2023
