= Wedding of Prince Carl Philip and Sofia Hellqvist =

2015 Swedish royal wedding

- Carl Philip and Sofia's dual cypher

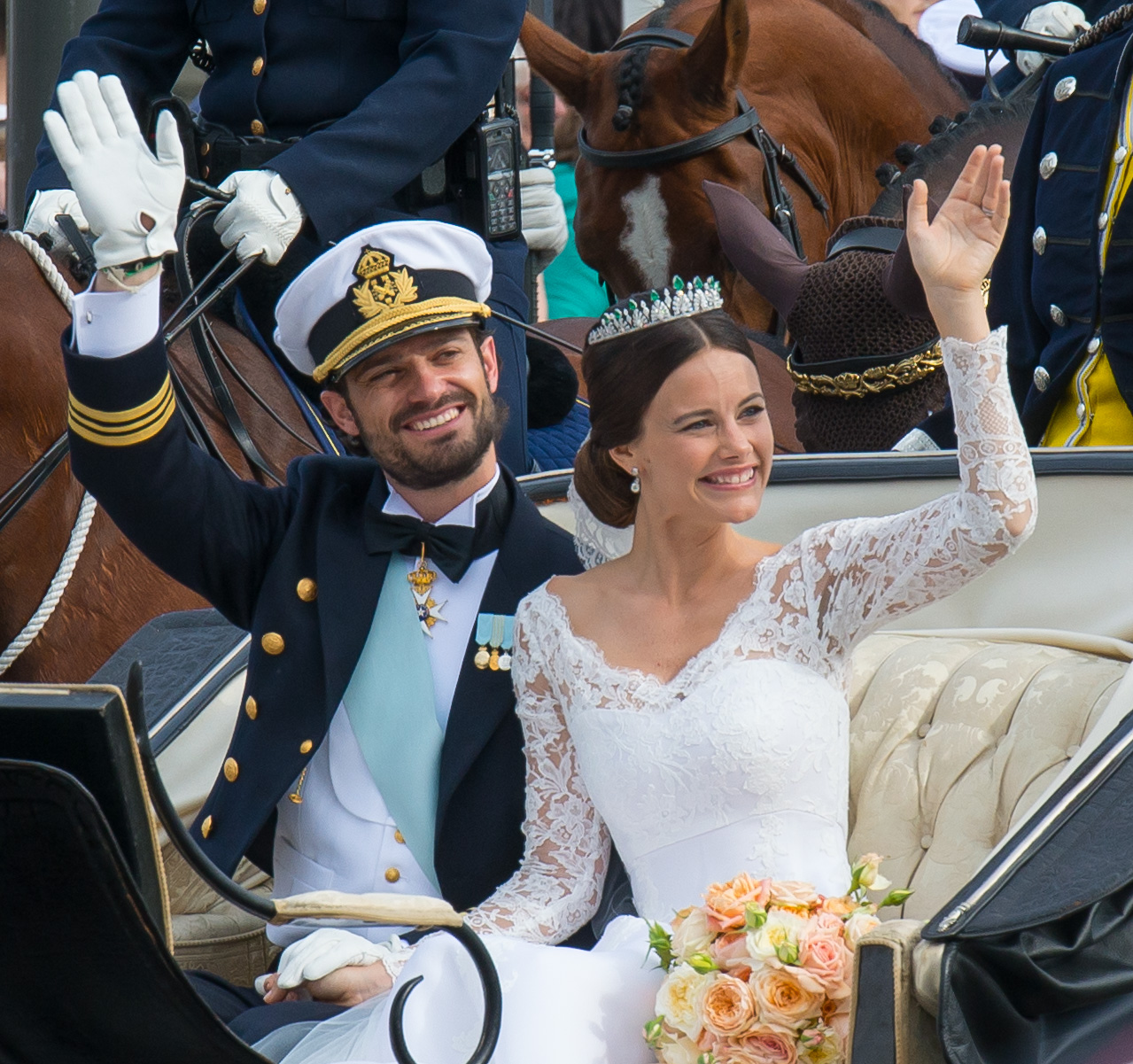
- Carl Philip and Sofia after their wedding
- Date: 13 June 2015
- Venue: Royal Chapel, Stockholm Palace
- Location: Stockholm, Sweden
- Participants: Prince Carl Philip, Duke of Värmland; Sofia Hellqvist

The wedding of Prince Carl Philip, Duke of Värmland, and Sofia Hellqvist took place on 13 June 2015 at Slottskyrkan, Stockholm.

This followed the couple's announcement of their engagement on 27 June 2014 saying: "We are looking forward to a summer wedding in the middle of June, when Sweden is extremely beautiful". The ceremony was broadcast on SVT live.

== Before the ceremony ==
On 17 May, the banns were read in the Royal Chapel of Stockholm Palace. On the same day the court announced that after the wedding, Sofia Hellqvist would be styled as Her Royal Highness Princess Sofia of Sweden, Duchess of Värmland.

The festivities began on Friday, 12 June, with a private dinner for invited guests on the island of Skeppsholmen.

== Ceremony ==
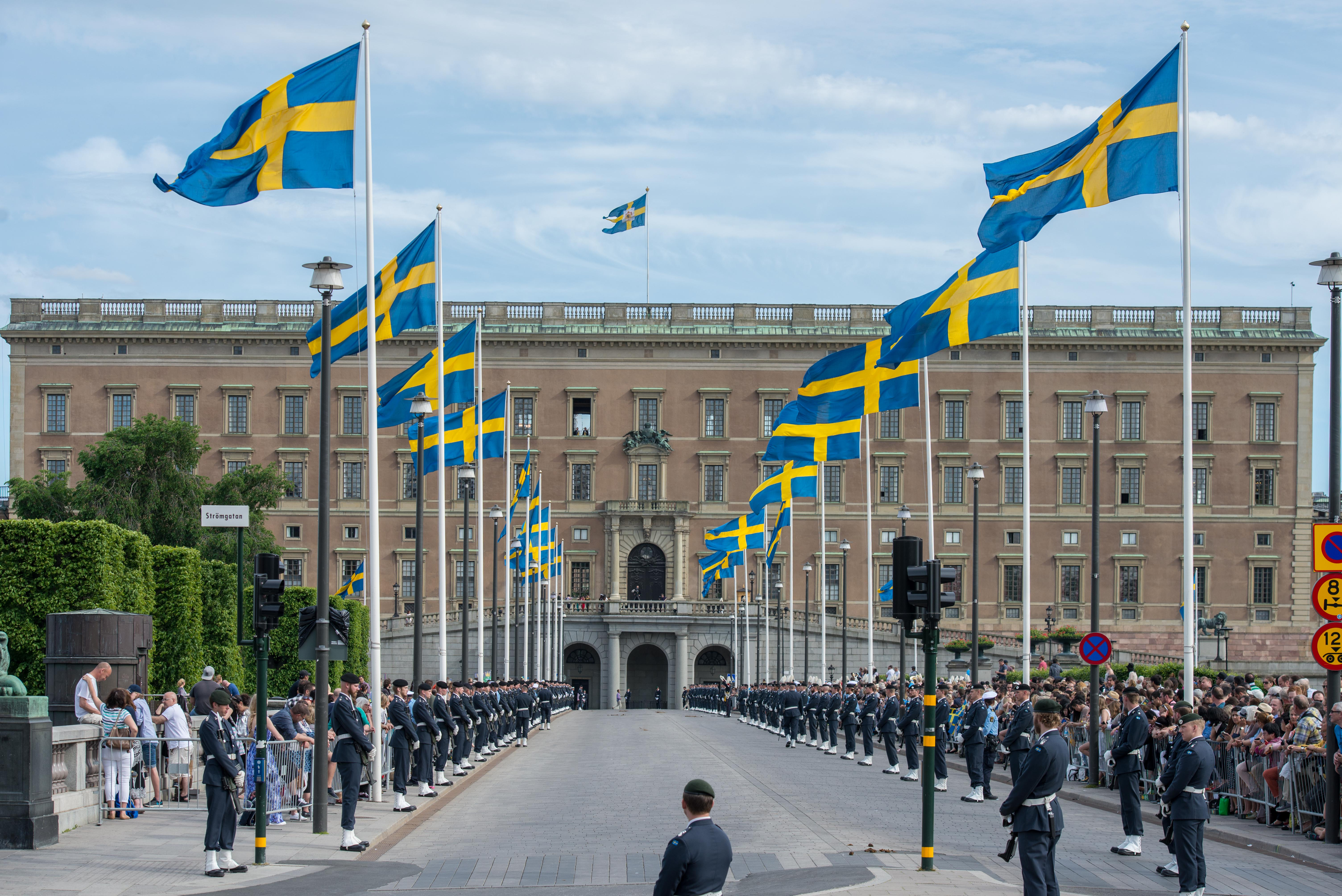
Guards lining the palace

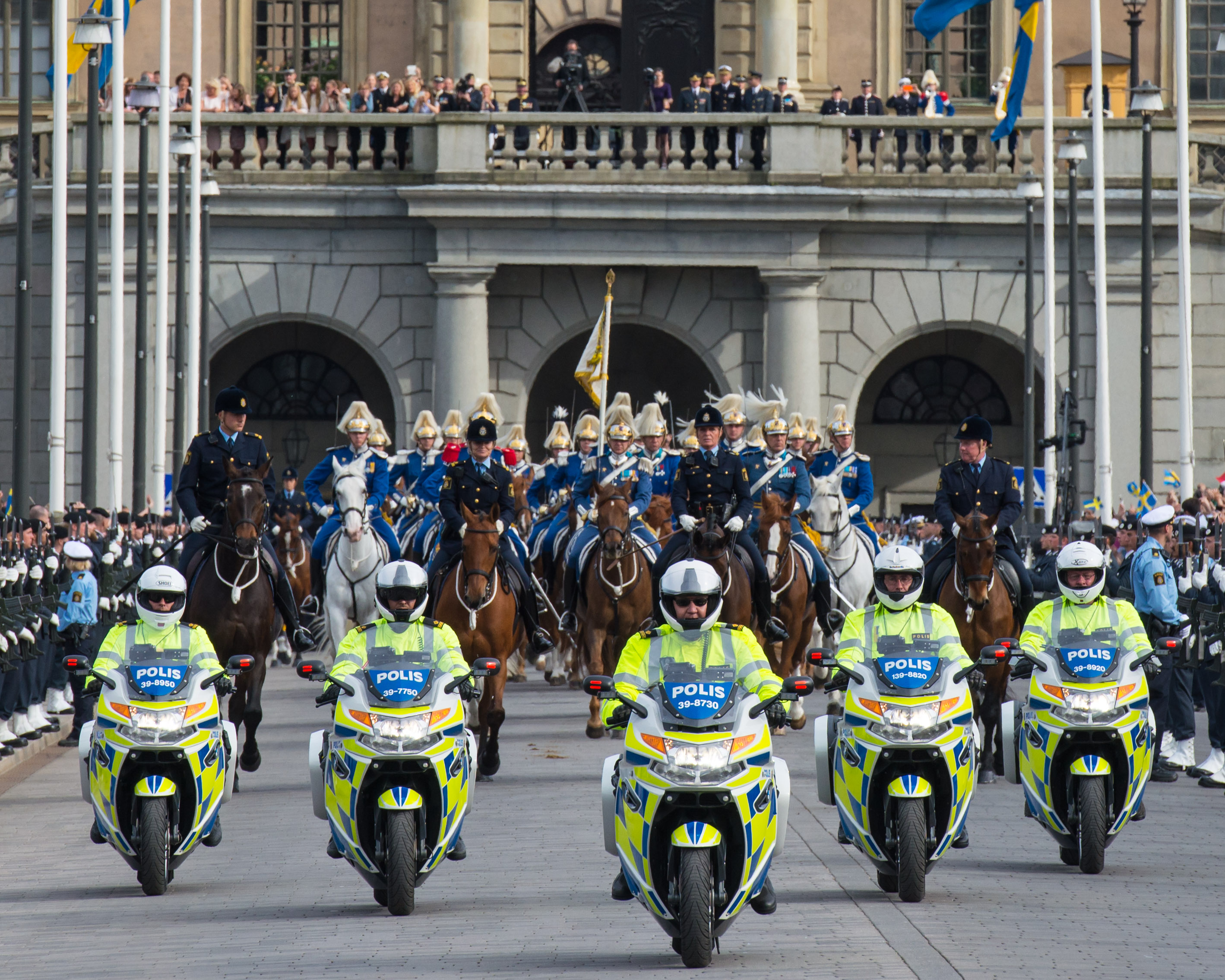
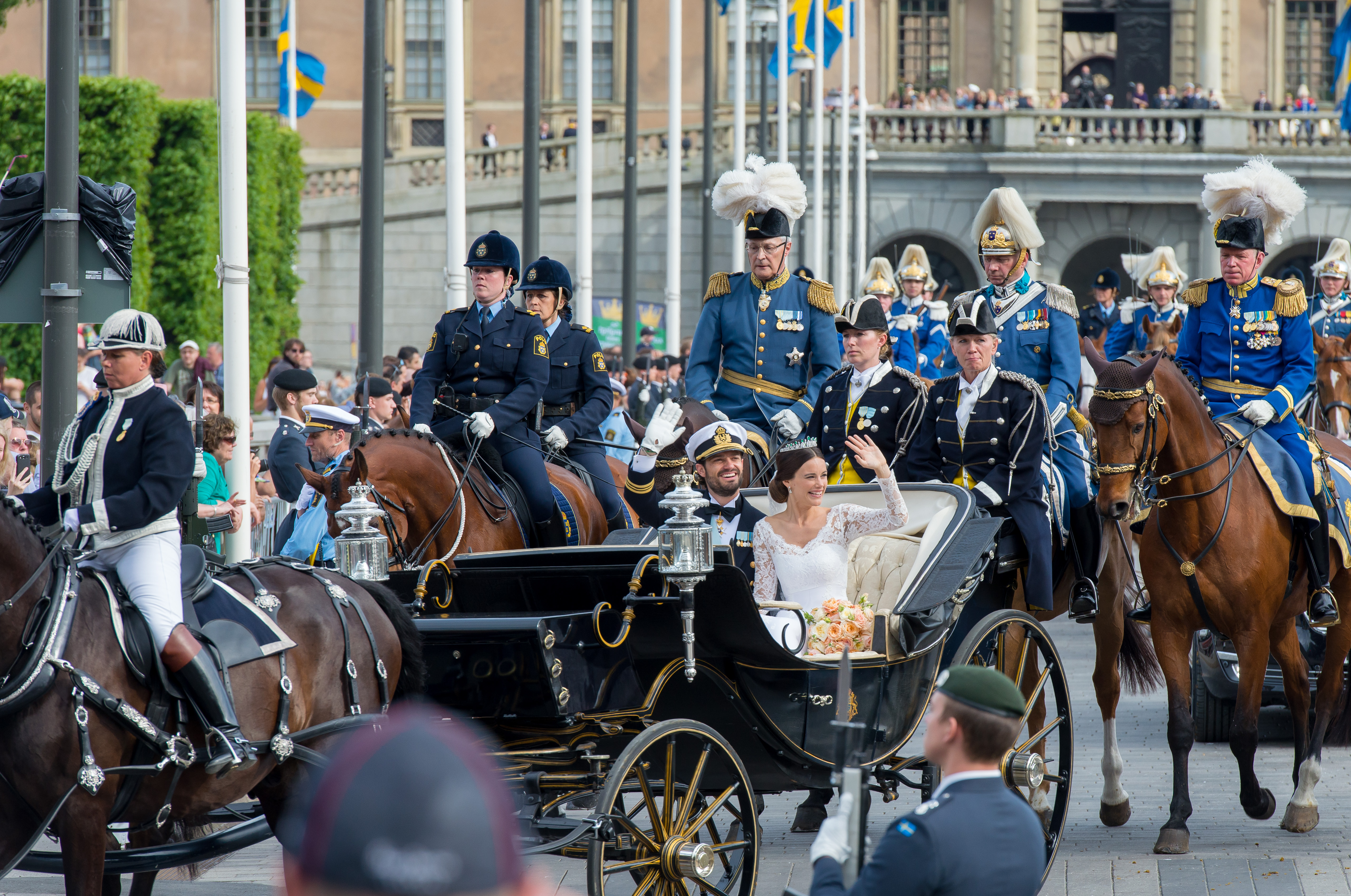
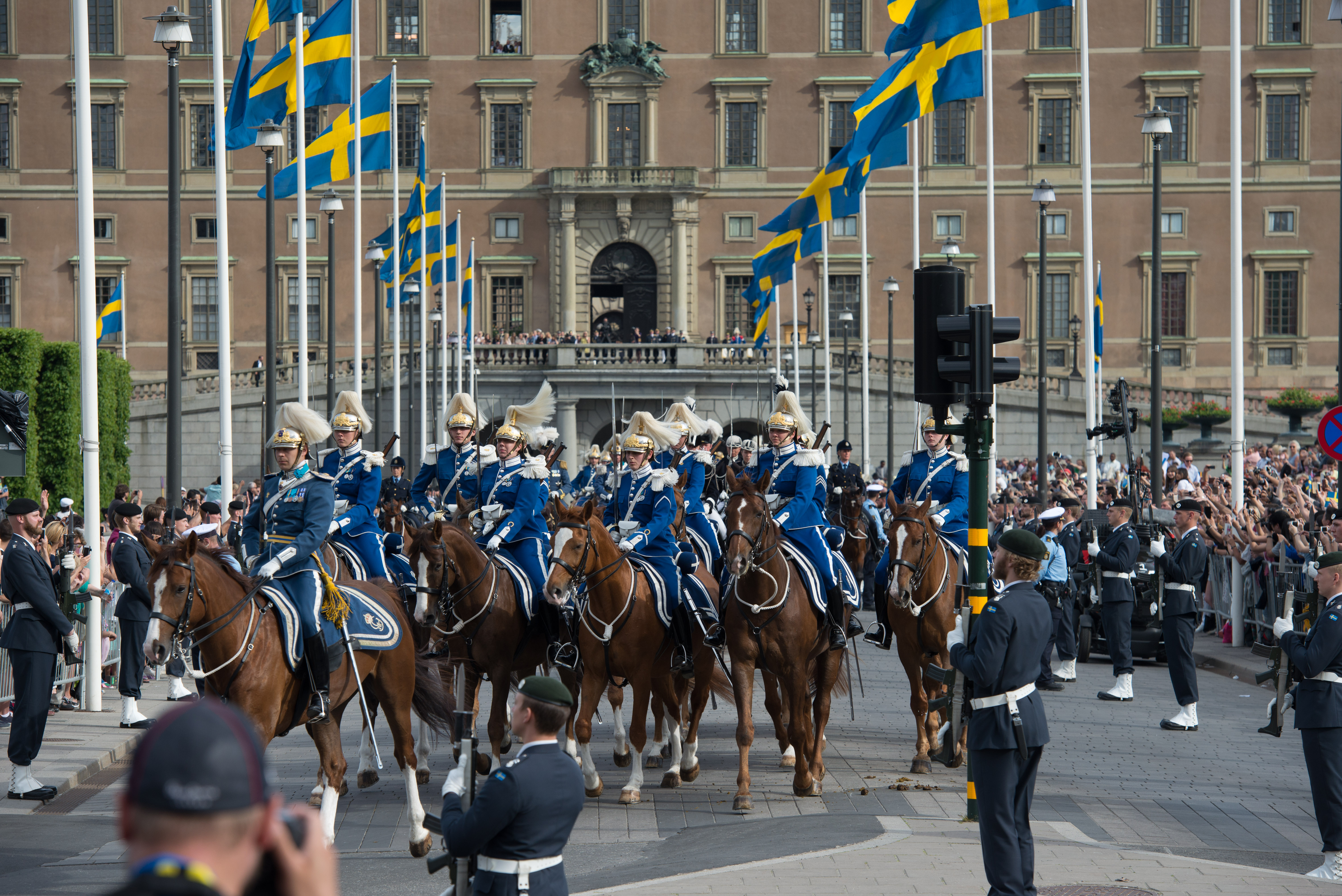
Procession leaving the palace

The wedding took place on Saturday 13 June at 16:30 in the Royal Chapel of Stockholm Palace. It was the seventh royal wedding held in the Slottskyrkan.

The ceremony was conducted by the Right Reverend Lars-Göran Lönnermark, Bishop Emeritus and Chief Court Chaplain, and the Reverend Michael Bjerkhagen, Court Chaplain and Rector of the Royal Court Parish.

The prince's close friend Jan-Åke Hansson served as his best man. The Prince's niece Princess Estelle, his cousin Patrick's children Anaïs Sommerlath and Chloé Sommerlath and Sofia's goddaughter Tiara Larsson served as bridesmaids. Sofia was escorted halfway down the aisle by her father. She and Prince Carl Philip walked together for the other half. During the marriage ceremony lead vocals were performed by Salem Al Fakir, David Pagmar and Samuel Ljungblahd.

Sofia wore a wedding dress designed by Ida Sjöstedt. The dress was in three tones of white and was made in crêpe in-silk that doubled with Italian organza. The dress and the train were embellished with couture lace. The veil was made of thin tulle with appliqués of sheer cotton lace. Sofia's bridal bouquet consisted of roses and myrtle. In keeping with the royal family's wedding bouquet tradition, the myrtle came from the grounds of Sofiero Castle. Sofia wore a diamond and emerald tiara gifted by the King and Queen of Sweden now called Princess Sofias Tiara. The flowers were in shades of cream and coral and were tied together. Carl Philip wore a mess dress dated to 1878.

Prince Carl Philip's crown, Prince Karl XIII's crown, lay on a cushion to the right of the altar while Princess Sofia Albertina's crown lay on a cushion to the left of the altar. The crowns are part of a tradition, crowns are used in association with a person the occasion is about.

After the wedding, the bride and groom rode in a horse-drawn carriage, leading a cortège from Stockholm Palace along its outer courtyard, through the streets of Slottsbacken, Skeppsbron, Slottskajen, Norrbro, Regeringsgatan, Hamngatan, Nybroplan, Nybrokajen, Hovslagargatan, Södra Blasieholmshamnen, Strömbron and finally arriving at the Logården of the Royal Palace. The Armed Forces paraded along the procession route and after arriving at Logården, they gave the couple a 21-gun salute. On the balcony of the palace, Carl Philip gave a short speech to the assembled crowd of well-wishers, asserting that "Sweden is a warm country." The King then "led the crowd in a traditional Swedish 'four cheers' for the couple."

The festivities continued with dinner in the White Sea Ballroom of Stockholm Palace and dancing in Karl XI's Gallery. Fredrik Eriksson, Mathias Dahlgren, Mark Aujalay, Henrik Norström and Mattias Ljungberg were responsible for the wedding dinner. At the wedding banquet, King Carl Gustaf welcomed guests and toasted the couple.

=== Music ===
The ceremony featured classical music as well as a significant amount of popular music. The bride walked down the aisle to an instrumental version of Enya's "Athair ar Neamh". The hymns "Guds kärlek är som stranden" (God's love is like the beach) and "I denna ljuva sommartid" were played on the church organ and sung by the choir and guests. Al Fakir performed "Fix You" by Coldplay. A Swedish version of "Umbrella", called "Paraply", was performed by David Pagmar. The couple exited the church to a rendition of "Joyful, Joyful We Adore Thee" led by gospel vocalist Samuel Ljungblahd. The hymn contained an interpolation of Janet Jackson's "What Have You Done For Me Lately", like the version performed in the film Sister Act 2.

Swedish musicians Avicii and Icona Pop performed at the wedding reception.

== Wedding cake ==
The colourful wedding cake contained pop rocks (fizzing candy) as a surprise for the guests.

== Guests ==
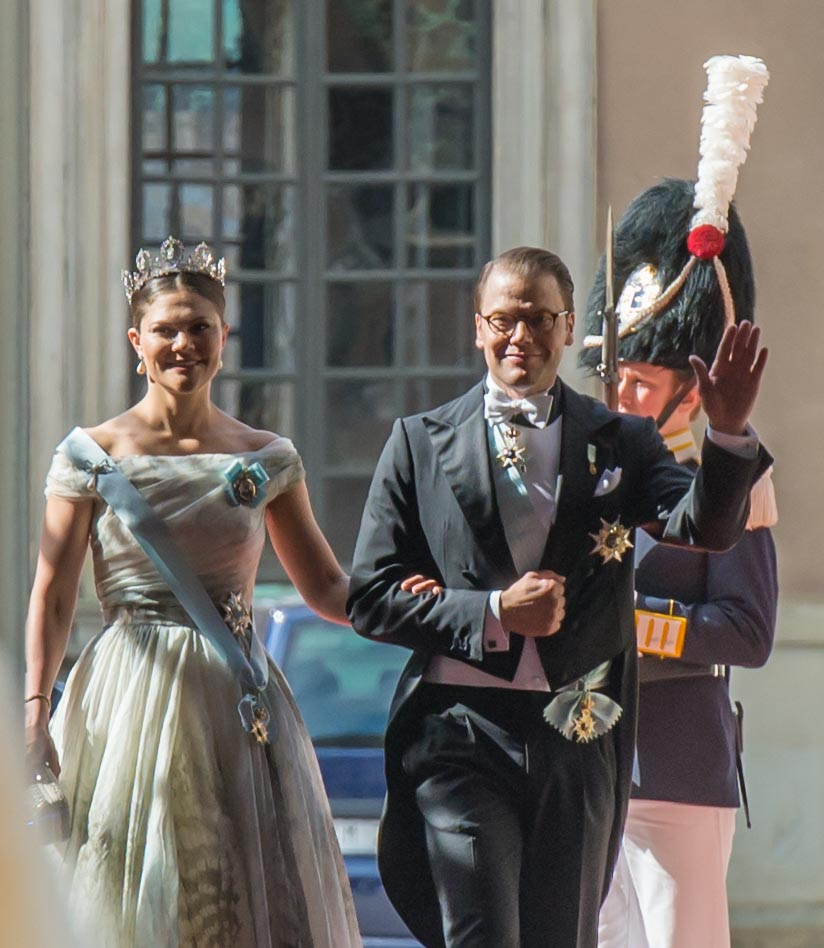
The crown princess of Sweden and Prince Daniel on their way to the church

=== The Groom's family ===
- The King and Queen, the groom's parents
  - The Crown Princess and Prince Daniel, Duke of Västergötland, the groom's older sister and brother-in-law
    - Princess Estelle, Duchess of Östergötland, the groom's niece and goddaughter
  - Princess Madeleine, Duchess of Hälsingland and Gästrikland and Mr Christopher O'Neill, the groom's younger sister and brother-in-law
    - Princess Leonore, Duchess of Gotland, the groom's niece
- Princess Margaretha, Mrs. Ambler, the groom's paternal aunt
  - Baroness Sybilla von Dincklage, the groom's first cousin
  - Mr James and Mrs Ursula Ambler, the groom's first cousin and his wife
- Princess Birgitta of Sweden and Hohenzollern, the groom's paternal aunt
  - Mrs Désirée and Mr Eckbert von Bohlen und Halbach, the groom's first cousin and her husband
  - Prince Hubertus and Princess Ute Maria of Hohenzollern, the groom's first cousin and his wife
- Princess Désirée, Baroness Silfverschiöld, and Baron Niclas Silfverschiöld, the groom's paternal aunt and uncle
  - Baron Carl Silfverschiöld, the groom's first cousin
  - Baroness Christina Louise and Baron Hans De Geer, the groom's first cousin and her husband
  - Baroness Hélène Silfverschiöld and Mr Fredrik Dieterle, the groom's first cousin and her partner
- Princess Christina, Mrs. Magnuson, and Mr Tord Magnuson, the groom's paternal aunt and uncle
  - Mr Gustaf and Mrs Vicky Magnuson, the groom's first cousin and his wife
  - Mr Oscar and Mrs Emma Magnuson, the groom's first cousin and his wife
  - Mr Victor Magnuson and Miss Frida Bergström, the groom's first cousin and his partner
- Countess Marianne Bernadotte of Wisborg, the groom's paternal grandaunt by marriage
- Count Bertil and Countess Jill Bernadotte of Wisborg, the groom's second cousin twice removed and his wife
- Mrs Dagmar von Arbin, the groom's second cousin twice removed
- Countess Bettina Bernadotte of Wisborg and Mr Philipp Haug, the groom's second cousin once removed and her husband
  - Mr Emil Bernadotte of Wisborg, the groom's godson and second cousin twice removed

==== Sommerlath family ====
- Mr Ralf de Toledo Sommerlath and Mrs Charlotte de Toledo Sommerlath, the groom's maternal uncle and aunt
- Mrs Carmita Sommerlath Baudinet and Mr Pierre Baudinet
- Miss Chloé Rdigues de Chennevière
- Mr Thomas de Toledo Sommerlath and Ms Bettina Aussems
- Mr Tim de Toledo Sommerlath and Mrs Kristina de Toledo Sommerlath
- Mr Philip de Toledo Sommerlath
- Miss Giulia de Toledo Sommerlath
- Mr Walther L. Sommerlath and Mrs Ingrid Sommerlath, the groom's maternal uncle and aunt
- Mr Patrick Sommerlath and Mrs Maline Sommerlath
- Mr Leopold Lundén Sommerlath
- Miss Chloé Sommerlath
- Miss Anaïs Sommerlath
- Miss Helena Christina Sommerlath and Dr Jan Sohn
- Ms Maria Salles Souto Ferreira

=== Relatives of the bride ===
- Mr Erik Hellqvist and Mrs Marie Hellqvist, the bride's parents
  - Miss Lina Hellqvist and Mr Jonas Frejd, the bride's sister and her guest
  - Miss Sara Hellqvist and Mr Oskar Bergman, the bride's sister and her guest
- Mrs Britt Rotman, the bride's maternal grandmother
- Mr Anders Rotman and Mrs Laila Rönn Rotman
- Mr Victor Rotman and Miss Eleonora Caiazza
- Mr Johan Rotman
- Mrs Lena Rotman and Mr Peter Nygren
  - Miss Hanna Nygren
  - Mr Andreas Nygren
- Mr Lars Hellqvist and Mrs Irena Hellqvist
- Mr Daniel Hellqvist
- Mr Martin Hellqvist

=== Foreign royalty ===
Members of reigning royal families

- (Belgium) The Queen of the Belgians (representing the King of the Belgians)
- The Queen of Denmark, the groom's first cousin once removed and godmother
  - The Crown Prince and Crown Princess of Denmark, the groom's second cousin and his wife
  - Prince Joachim and Princess Marie of Denmark, the groom's second cousin and his wife
- The Princess Takamado (representing The Emperor of Japan)
- The Queen of Norway (representing the King of Norway)
  - The Crown Prince and Crown Princess of Norway, the groom's third cousin and his wife
  - Princess Märtha Louise of Norway and Ari Behn, the groom's third cousin and her husband
- The Queen of the Netherlands (representing the King of the Netherlands)
- The Earl and Countess of Wessex (representing the Queen of the United Kingdom)

Members of non-reigning royal families

- Prince Leopold and Princess Ursula of Bavaria, the groom's godfather and his wife
  - Prince Manuel and Princess Anna of Bavaria
- Prince Nikolaos and Princess Tatiana of Greece and Denmark, the groom's second cousin and his wife
- The Hereditary Prince of Saxe-Coburg and Gotha, the groom's second cousin

=== Wedding attendants ===
- Princess Estelle, Duchess of Östergötland (bridesmaid)
- Miss Anaïs Sommerlath (bridesmaid)
- Miss Chloé Sommerlath (bridesmaid)
- Miss Tiara Larsson (bridesmaid)
- Mr. Jan-Åke Hansson (best man)

== See also ==
- The Swedish Royal Family's jewelry
- Wedding of Victoria, Crown Princess of Sweden, and Daniel Westling
- Wedding of Princess Madeleine and Christopher O'Neill
