= Michael Bjerkhagen =

Swedish priest and actor

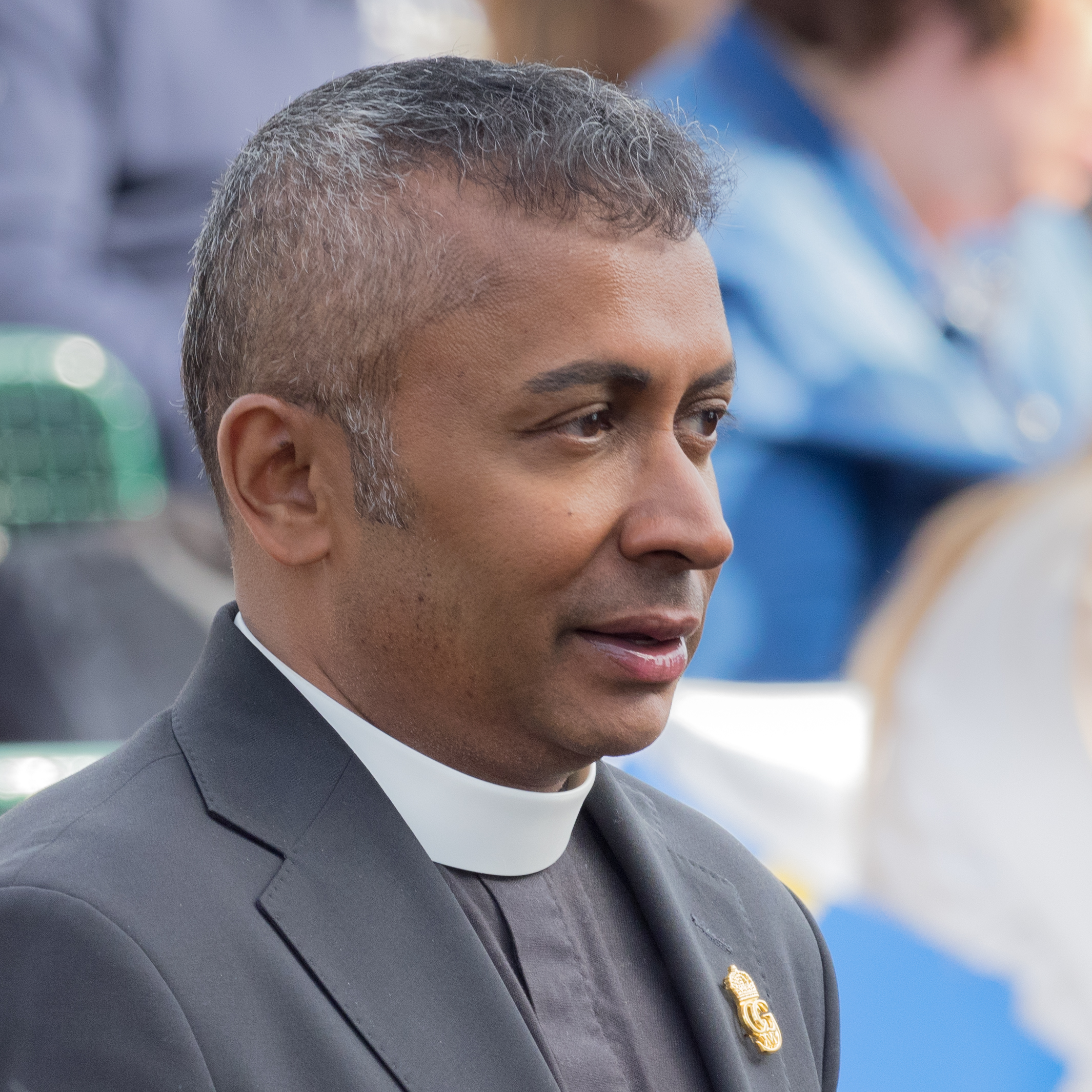
Michael Bjerkhagen at the National Day of Sweden 2016.

Michael Russel Johannes Bjerkhagen (born 28 November 1966 in Kandy, Sri Lanka) is a Swedish priest. He is pastor of the Royal Court Parish and chaplain to the King Carl XVI Gustaf of Sweden.

== Early life ==
He left Sri Lanka in July 1972 when he was 5-years-old with his adoptive sister, having been adopted by a childless Swedish couple Christer Bjerkhagen. Both he and his adoptive sister were at the same orphanage, Evelyn Nurseries Orphanage, in Kandy. His adoptive father, Michael Bjerkhagen, was a Colonel of the Royal Cavalry Regiment and his adoptive mother was an economist. He did not have difficulty communicating with his adoptive parents as he was fluent in English from his childhood as his biological mother was of Burgher descent; his birth father came from a Buddhist family with a long tradition in Sri Lanka.

He had a prosperous upbringing in Sweden. His family has been equestrian competitors leading him to develop riding skills. He was taught to respect the Throne, the Cross and the Sword (meaning the Monarchy, the Church and the Armed Forces), as well as learning to help others and caring for those who are less fortunate. Ten years after his arrival in Sweden, his family adopted his other sister.

== Education ==
His primary education was at Stenstorp School in the west of Sweden. Then he went to Ålleberg High School in Falköping where he studied both Latin and Greek, which alongside religion studies were his favourite subjects. He had a good singing voice and was a boy soprano before he became a tenor.

After he graduated from high school and finished basic military training, he decided to further his studies to become a priest.

He studied to theology at Sweden’s oldest university in Uppsala (founded in 1477) with the intentions of becoming a priest. He also spent a year at an English theological college in Lincoln in Northeastern England.

At Uppsala, his specialist subjects were New Testament Exegesis and classical Greek. Old Testament Exegesis and Hebrew as well as Psychology of Religions and Church History. His other great interests during the study period were ecumenism and the so- necessary dialogue between religions.

In 1990, he took a master's degree in Theology in 1991 was ordained as priest in the Church of Sweden, Diocese of Stockholm, and Stockholm Cathedral. He immediately hired by one of the inner-city congregations St. Johannes, and after that Högalid.

In 2002–2003, he began his graduate studies in Liturgy and Ecumenism at the Pontifical University Angelicum in Rome. He stayed at a home for priests in the Vatican. Hebecame conversant in the Italian language devoted himself to my hobbies: history and archeology.

== Personal life ==
According to Bjerkhagen, his dream since childhood was to become a priest. His parents supported his wish and helped him to become a priest.

He found information about his birth parents through the Evelyn Nurseries his godparents in Sri Lanka. They helped him to find the details of his parents from the files of the Evelyn Orphanage. He went to Sri Lanka for the first time in the summer 2011 to discover his family.

He discovered that his parents had died. However, he met his godparents and seven siblings, spending about two weeks with them before returning to Sweden. But since his visit, he thinks about his family and his country and feels that he has two homes; one in Sweden and one in Sri Lanka.

== Work as a priest ==
He was ordained as priest in the Church of Sweden in 1991. In March 2013, he did liturg at the funeral of Princess Lilian and June 8, 2013 one of the two priests at the wedding of Princess Madeleine and Christopher O'Neill and also one of the two priests at the wedding between Prince Carl Philip and Sofia Hellqvist June 13, 2015.

He also wants to work for the people of Sri Lanka to share knowledge to help people and to develop his country. One of his causes Father Michael Bjerkhagen is helping orphanages in Sri Lanka. One of them is The St. Johns boys home in Kegalle.
