= Wedding of Princess Madeleine and Christopher O'Neill =

2013 Swedish royal wedding

- Madeleine and Christopher’s dual cypher

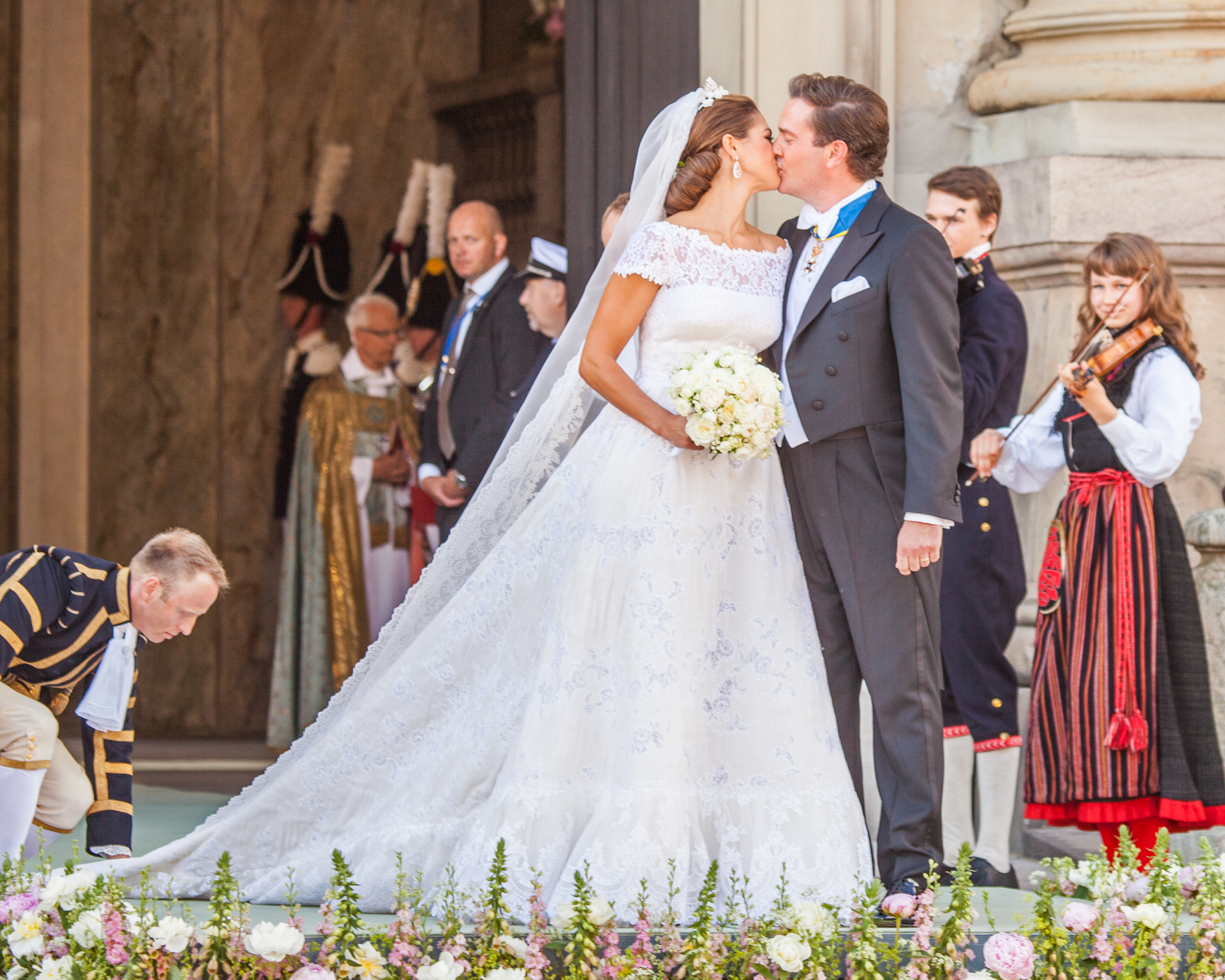
- The newlyweds following the ceremony
- Date: 8 June 2013
- Venue: Royal Chapel, Stockholm Palace
- Location: Stockholm, Sweden
- Participants: Princess Madeleine, Duchess of Hälsingland and Gästrikland; Christopher O'Neill

The wedding of Princess Madeleine, Duchess of Hälsingland and Gästrikland, and the British-born American financier Christopher O'Neill took place in Stockholm on 8 June 2013.

== Background ==
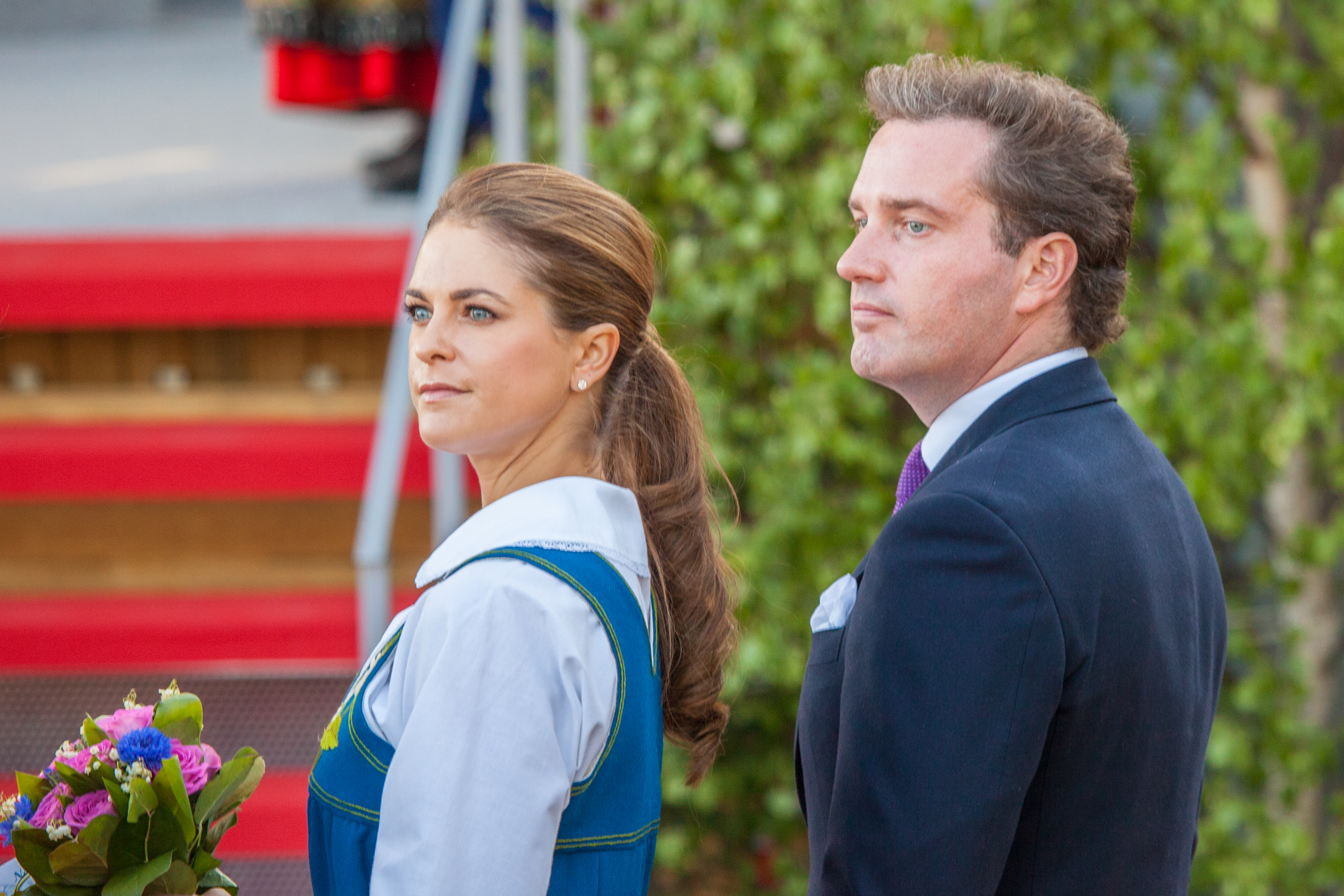
The couple at the celebrations of the National Day of Sweden, two days prior to the wedding.

Princess Madeleine is the second daughter and youngest child of King Carl XVI Gustaf and Queen Silvia of Sweden. As such, she is currently ninth in the line of succession to the throne. In 2009, she was engaged to marry the Swedish lawyer Jonas Bergström, with whom she had been in relationship since 2002. The wedding was set to take place in 2010, shortly after the June wedding of Princess Madeleine's elder sister and heir apparent to the throne, Crown Princess Victoria. In April 2010, however, the wedding was canceled and the engagement was broken off. Madeleine subsequently moved to New York City, where she met the British-born financier Christopher O’Neill. The first time they appeared in public as a couple was in January 2011. Their engagement was announced on 25 October 2012. The wedding was both publicly financed and paid by for by the king (who did not reveal how much he paid). The wedding cost an estimated 3 million kronor.

== Ceremony ==
The ceremony was held at the Royal Palace chapel in Stockholm on 8 June 2013. Lars-Göran Lönnermark, Chief Court Chaplain of the Royal Court and Bishop Emeritus of Skara, and Michael Bjerkhagen, Vicar of the Royal Court, conducted the ceremony. SVT, TV4 and TV4 News broadcast the wedding live throughout the entire day for Swedish viewers. Madeleine wore a wedding dress designed by Italian fashion designer Valentino Garavani. She wore a private tiara called modern fringe tiara. Madeleine was escorted halfway down the aisle by her father King Carl XVI Gustaf. She and Chris walked together for the other half. At the left of the altar sat the crown of Hedvig Elisabeth Charlotte, Queen of Norway and Sweden, the same crown that was present at the baptismal font at Princess Madeleine's christening.

== Wedding cake ==
The cake was made of 700 macarons stacked into a pyramid shape.

== After the wedding ==
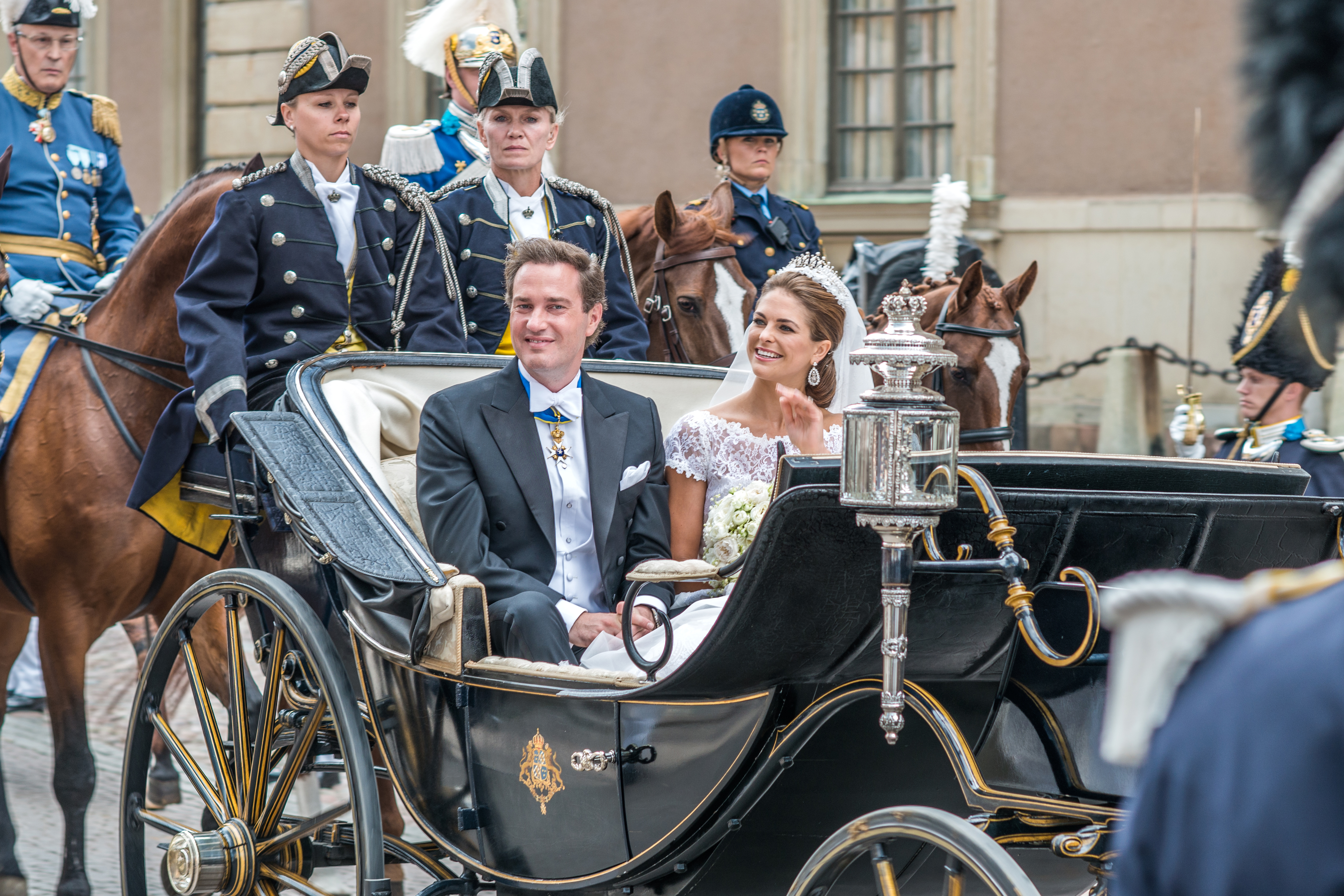
The procession after the wedding

Princess Madeleine did not adopt the surname O'Neill and instead remained without a surname, allowing her to retain the style of Royal Highness. Christopher O'Neill also did not change his last name, unlike his brother-in-law Daniel, husband of Crown Princess Victoria.

In May 2013, the Marshal of the Realm Svante Lindqvist announced that O'Neill had asked not to be granted royal status and to remain a private citizen. O'Neill wished to retain his UK and US citizenships and his business as Head of Research at an investment firm in New York City, while relinquishing both the citizenships and business are necessary to become a member of the Swedish Royal Family. O'Neill therefore did not become Prince of Sweden or Duke of Hälsingland and Gästrikland. On the website of the Swedish Royal Court he was listed as a member of the royal family until the site was updated.

O'Neill is Roman Catholic and the couple intended to continue residing in New York immediately after their wedding (but later moved to London, England for a few years), but their children will have to be raised in Sweden and as Lutherans, like their mother, in order to have succession rights. On 7 October 2019 Madeleine's father the king issued a statement rescinding the royal status of her three children in an effort to more strictly associate Swedish royalty to the office of the head of state; they are still to be styled as princesses and prince, as well as duchesses and duke of their provinces, and they remain in the line of succession to the throne. Madeleine commented that her children now will have greater possibilities to format their own lives as private persons.

In August 2018, the Swedish Royal Court announced that the princess and her family were to move to Florida.

== Guests ==
=== The bride's paternal family ===
- The King and Queen, the bride's parents
  - The Crown Princess and Prince Daniel, Duke of Västergötland, the bride's sister and brother-in-law
    - Princess Estelle, Duchess of Östergötland, the bride's niece
  - Prince Carl Philip, Duke of Värmland, the bride's brother
- Princess Margaretha, Mrs Ambler, the bride's paternal aunt
- Princess Birgitta and Prince Johann Georg of Hohenzollern, the bride's paternal aunt and uncle
  - Prince Carl Christian and Princess Nicole of Hohenzollern, the bride's first cousin and his wife
    - Prince Nicolas of Hohenzollern, the bride's first cousin, once removed
- Princess Désirée, Baroness Silfverschiöld, and Baron Niclas Silfverschiöld, the bride's paternal aunt and uncle
- Princess Christina, Mrs Magnuson, and Mr Tord Magnuson, the bride's paternal aunt and uncle
- Countess Marianne Bernadotte of Wisborg, the bride's paternal grandaunt by marriage
- Countess Gunnila Bernadotte of Wisborg, the bride's paternal grandaunt by marriage

=== The Bride's maternal family ===
- Ralf de Toledo Sommerlath and Mrs Charlotte de Toledo Sommerlath, the bride's maternal uncle and aunt
  - Carmita Sommerlath Baudinet and Mr Pierre Baudinet, the bride's cousin and her husband
  - Thomas de Toledo Sommerlath and Ms Bettina Aussems, the bride's cousin and his partner
    - Tim de Toledo Sommerlath and Ms Kristina Junghans, the bride's cousin, once removed and his partner
    - Philip de Toledo Sommerlath, the bride's cousin, once removed
    - Giulia de Toledo Sommerlath, the bride's cousin, once removed
- Walther L. Sommerlath and Mrs Ingrid Sommerlath, the bride's maternal uncle and aunt
  - Patrick Sommerlath and Mrs Maline Sommerlath, the bride's cousin and his wife
    - Leopold Lundén Sommerlath, the bride's cousin, once removed
    - Chloé Sommerlath, bridesmaid, the bride's cousin, once removed
    - Anaïs Sommerlath, bridesmaid, the bride's cousin, once removed
  - Helena Christina Sommerlath, the bride's cousin
  - Vivien Nadine Sommerlath, the bride's cousin

=== The groom's family ===
- Eva Maria O'Neill, the groom's mother
  - Annalisa O'Neill, the groom's half-sister
  - Karen O'Neill, the groom's half-sister
  - Stefanie O'Neill, the groom's half-sister
  - Tatjana d'Abo and Henry d'Abo, the groom's half-sister and her husband
    - Anouska d'Abo, the groom's niece
    - Celina d'Abo, the groom's niece
    - Jasper d'Abo, pageboy, the groom's nephew
  - Countess Natascha von Abensberg-Traun and Count Ernst von Abensberg-Traun, the groom's half-sister and her husband
    - Countess Milana von Abensberg-Traun, the groom's niece
    - Count Moritz von Abensberg-Traun, the groom's nephew
    - Countess Chiara von Abensberg-Traun, bridesmaid, the groom's niece
    - Count Louis Cajetan von Abensberg-Traun, pageboy, the groom's nephew

=== Foreign royalty ===
The following members of foreign royal families attended the wedding:

==== Members of reigning royal families ====
- The Crown Prince and Crown Princess of Denmark (representing the Queen of Denmark)
- Prince Joachim and Princess Marie of Denmark
- Princess Benedikte of Denmark (Princess Madeleine's godmother)
- Princess Takamado (representing the Emperor of Japan)
- The Princess of Monaco (representing the Prince of Monaco)
- The Crown Prince and Crown Princess of Norway (representing the King of Norway)
- Princess Märtha Louise of Norway and Ari Behn
- The Earl and Countess of Wessex (representing the Queen of the United Kingdom and Commonwealth Realms)
- The Hereditary Grand Duke and Hereditary Grand Duchess of Luxembourg (representing the Grand Duke of Luxembourg)

==== Members of non-reigning royal families ====
- Prince Leopold and Princess Ursula of Bavaria
  - Prince Manuel and Princess Anna of Bavaria
- Crown Prince Pavlos and Crown Princess Marie-Chantal of Greece
- Prince Nikolaos and Princess Tatiana of Greece and Denmark
- Princess Theodora of Greece and Denmark
- Prince Philippos of Greece and Denmark
- The Prince of Saxe-Coburg and Gotha
  - The Hereditary Prince and Hereditary Princess of Saxe-Coburg and Gotha
- Maharana Arvind Singh Mewar of Udaipur

== Wedding attendants ==
- Chloé Sommerlath (bridesmaid)
- Anaïs Sommerlath (bridesmaid)
- Lillie von Horn (bridesmaid)
- Countess Chiara Abensperg und Traun (bridesmaid)
- Jasper d'Abo (pageboy)
- Count Louis Cajetan Abensperg und Traun (pageboy)
- Cedric Notz (best man)

== See also ==
- The Swedish Royal Family's jewelry
- Wedding of Victoria, Crown Princess of Sweden, and Daniel Westling
- Wedding of Prince Carl Philip and Sofia Hellqvist
