= Johan Elf =

Swedish biophysicist

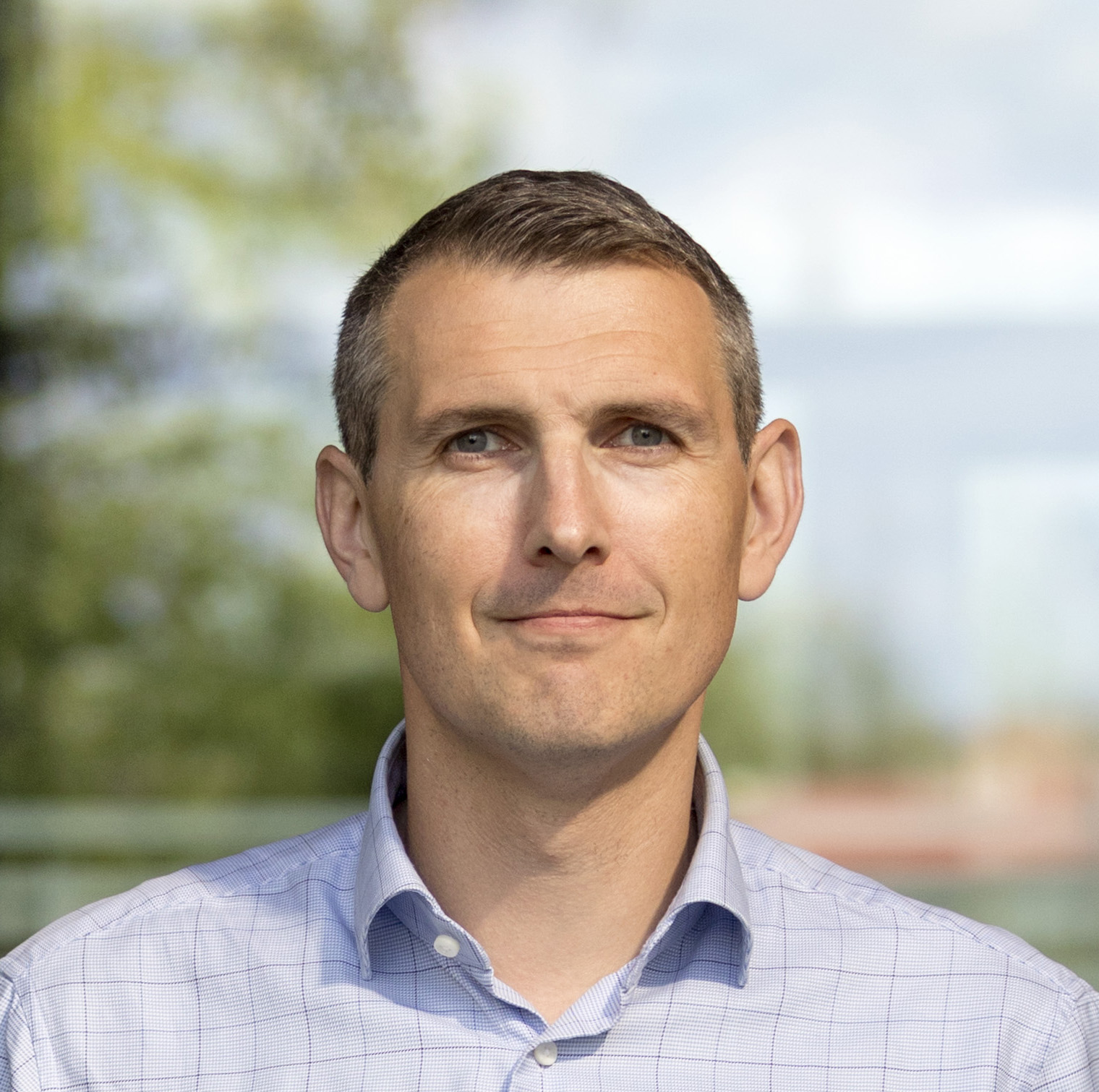
- Johan Elf in 2017
- Born: Per Johan Sven Elf; May 8, 1975 (age 51); Motala, Sweden
- Education: Uppsala University (PhD)
- Scientific career
- Fields: Biophysics
- Workplaces: Uppsala University
- Thesis: Intracellular flow and fluctuations (2004)
- Doctoral advisor: Måns Ehrenberg
- Website: elflab.icm.uu.se

Per Johan Sven Elf (born 1975) is a Swedish biophysicist and professor of physical biology at Uppsala University. He is known for single-molecule studies of how transcription factors find their targets in living bacteria, for early work on image-based pooled genetic screening, and for a rapid antibiotic susceptibility test that was commercialised by Astrego Diagnostics, a company he founded, and won the 2024 Longitude Prize on antimicrobial resistance. He is a member of the Royal Swedish Academy of Sciences and a Wallenberg Scholar.

== Early life and education ==
Elf was born in 1975 in Motala, Sweden. He studied molecular biotechnology at Uppsala University, where he received his PhD in 2004 under Måns Ehrenberg with a thesis on flows and fluctuations in intracellular biochemical processes.

== Career ==
After his doctorate, Elf was a postdoctoral researcher in the group of Xiaoliang Sunney Xie at Harvard University, where he worked on single-molecule imaging of transcription factors in living cells. He returned to Uppsala University in 2008, where he held a research fellowship of the Royal Swedish Academy of Sciences and became docent in molecular biotechnology, and was appointed professor of physical biology in 2013. Elf has received grants from the European Research Council in each of its three main categories: a Starting Grant in the ERC's first call in 2007, a Consolidator Grant in the first Consolidator call in 2013, and an Advanced Grant in 2019.

Elf was elected to the class for chemistry of the Royal Swedish Academy of Sciences in 2016, to the membership of EMBO in 2022, and as a Fellow of the Royal Swedish Academy of Engineering Sciences in 2025. He has been supported by the Knut and Alice Wallenberg Foundation as a Wallenberg Academy Fellow from 2012 and as a Wallenberg Scholar from 2019.

== Research ==
Elf's research combines fluorescence microscopy, microfluidics and computational modelling to study how molecular processes in bacterial cells operate at the level of single molecules and single cells.

=== Single-molecule tracking in living cells ===
As a postdoctoral researcher with Xie at Harvard, Elf developed methods for observing single fluorescently labelled transcription factors in living Escherichia coli cells, which the group used to measure how a lac repressor molecule finds and binds its target on the chromosome. The work was described at the time as the first direct, real-time observation of transcription factor search in a living cell. In Uppsala, his group extended the approach to show that the lac repressor searches for its operator by a combination of three-dimensional diffusion and one-dimensional sliding along DNA, a mechanism that had been proposed theoretically and observed in vitro but not previously demonstrated in living cells. Later single-molecule studies from the group examined how the repressor explores the DNA surface and can pass over its target without binding. The Swedish Chemical Society awarded Elf its Norblad-Ekstrand Medal for 2021 for this body of work on characterising single molecules inside living cells.

=== Rapid antibiotic susceptibility testing ===
In 2017, Elf's group reported a method for determining whether bacteria from a urine sample are susceptible to an antibiotic in under 30 minutes, by trapping individual cells in a microfluidic chip and imaging their growth response. Conventional susceptibility testing takes one to two days; the new method was intended to allow the choice of antibiotic to be made during the patient's first visit. The technique grew out of imaging methods the group had developed for basic research on single bacterial cells.

The same year, Elf founded Astrego Diagnostics AB in Uppsala to develop the method into a point-of-care product, and received the Swedish Foundation for Strategic Research's first Utilisation Prize for the work. The company, which had entered the Longitude Prize on antimicrobial resistance in 2015 under the name Rivendell Fluidics, was later acquired by the Japanese diagnostics company Sysmex Corporation and renamed Sysmex Astrego. In June 2024, Sysmex Astrego's PA-100 system, based on the Uppsala research, was awarded the £8 million Longitude Prize on AMR, chosen from more than 250 entries from around the world.

=== Optical pooled screening ===
In 2017, Elf's group reported one of the first pooled genetic screens in which cells were first characterised by live-cell microscopy and then genotyped in situ, linking each cell's phenotype to its genetic perturbation. The approach was highlighted by Nature Methods, alongside a concurrent method from another group, as extending pooled screening to image-based phenotypes. Screens of this kind are now generally referred to as optical pooled screening. In 2021, Elf became a scientific co-founder of Bifrost Biosystems, a Cambridge, Massachusetts spin-out from Harvard Medical School that is commercialising optical pooled screening.

== Awards and honours ==
- 2010 – Göran Gustafsson Prize in molecular biology
- 2012 – Wallenberg Academy Fellow, Knut and Alice Wallenberg Foundation (prolongation grant 2017)
- 2007 – European Research Council Starting Grant
- 2013 – European Research Council Consolidator Grant
- 2019 – European Research Council Advanced Grant
- 2016 – Member of the Royal Swedish Academy of Sciences, class for chemistry
- 2017 – Utilisation Prize (Nyttiggörandepriset) of the Swedish Foundation for Strategic Research, awarded in its inaugural year
- 2019 – Wallenberg Scholar, Knut and Alice Wallenberg Foundation
- 2021 – Norblad-Ekstrand Medal of the Swedish Chemical Society
- 2022 – Member of the European Molecular Biology Organization
- 2022 – Uppsala University Innovation Prize Hjärnäpplet, shared with Özden Baltekin
- 2024 – The Longitude Prize on AMR (£8 million) was awarded to Sysmex Astrego for a rapid antibiotic susceptibility test based on technology developed in Elf's laboratory
- 2025 – Fellow of the Royal Swedish Academy of Engineering Sciences
