= Princess Madeleine, Duchess of Hälsingland and Gästrikland =

Swedish princess (born 1982)

Princess Madeleine
- Duchess of Hälsingland and Gästrikland
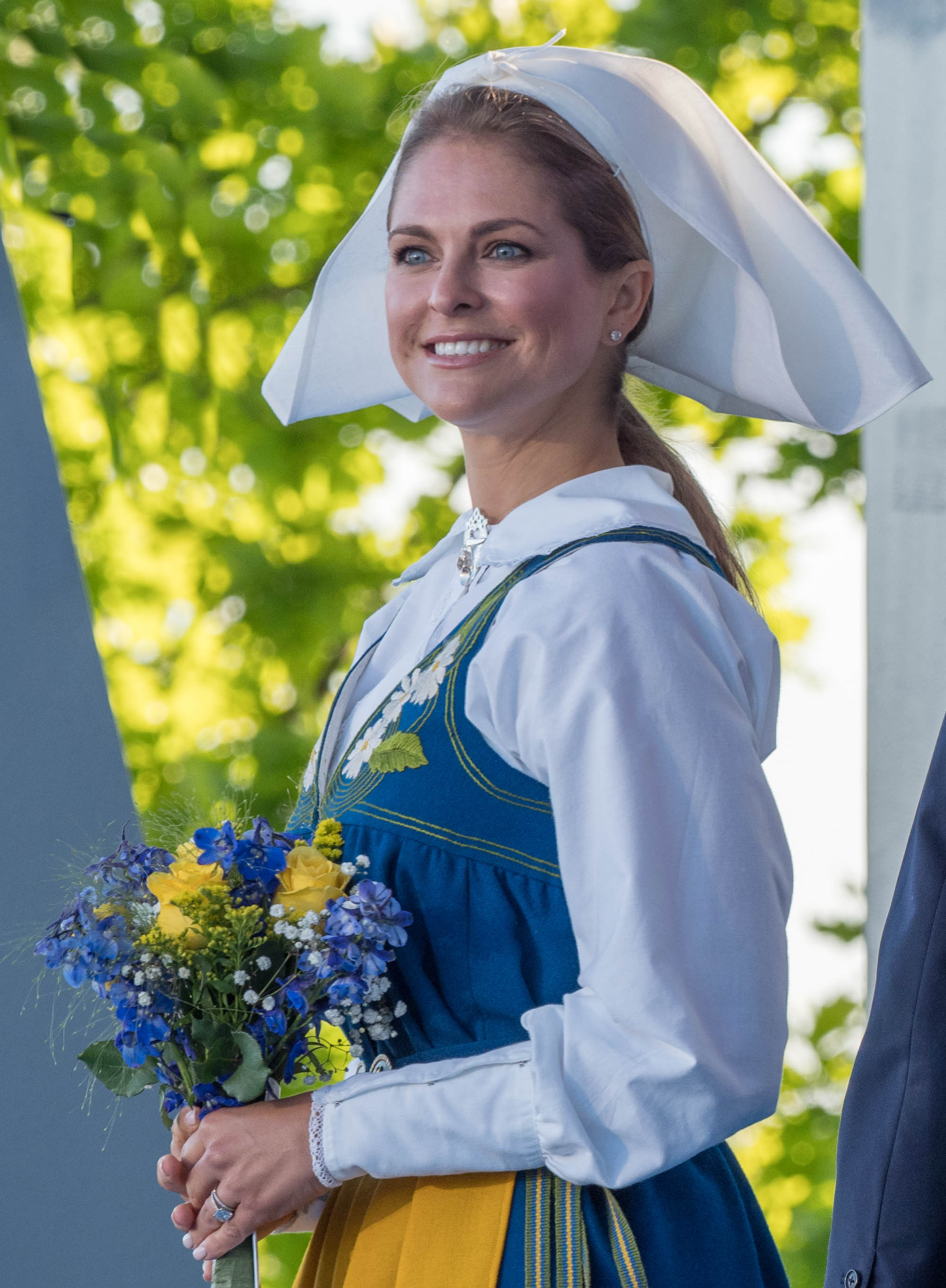
- Madeleine in 2017
- Born: 10 June 1982 (age 44); Drottningholm Palace, Ekerö, Sweden
- Spouse: Christopher O'Neill (m. 2013)
- Issue: Princess Leonore, Duchess of Gotland; Prince Nicolas, Duke of Ångermanland; Princess Adrienne, Duchess of Blekinge
Names
- Madeleine Thérèse Amelie Josephine
- House: Bernadotte
- Father: Carl XVI Gustaf
- Mother: Silvia Sommerlath
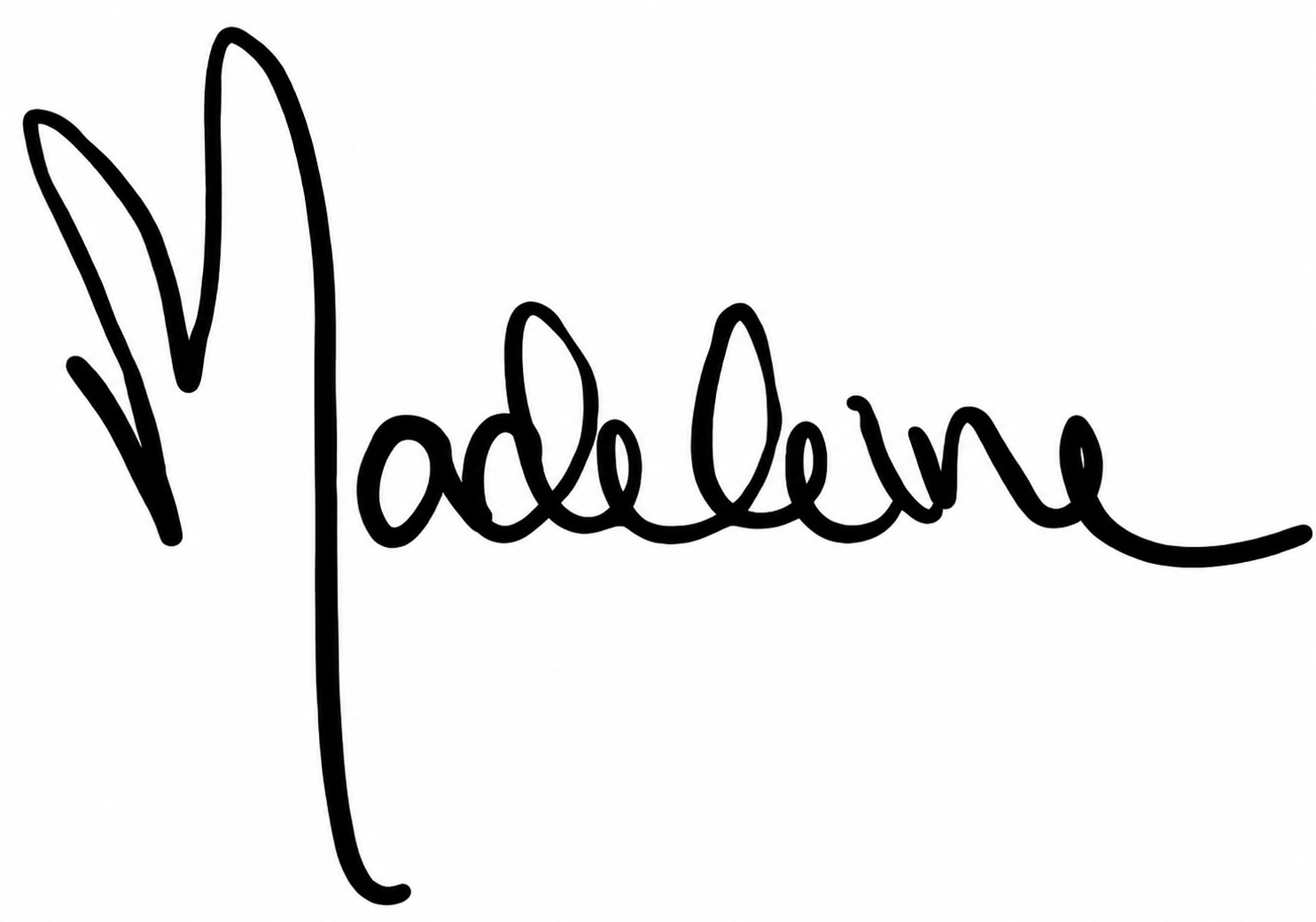
- Signature
- Education: Stockholm University

Princess Madeleine of Sweden, Duchess of Hälsingland and Gästrikland (Madeleine Thérèse Amelie Josephine; born 10 June 1982) is the second daughter and youngest child of King Carl XVI Gustaf and Queen Silvia. Upon her birth, she was third in line of succession to the Swedish throne; currently, she is ninth. Princess Madeleine is married to British-American financier Christopher O'Neill. They have three children, Princess Leonore, Prince Nicolas and Princess Adrienne.

== Early life ==
Madeleine was born on 10 June 1982 at 19:05 CEST at Drottningholm Palace and is a member of the Swedish royal family from the House of Bernadotte. She was christened at The Royal Palace Church on 31 August 1982, her godparents being her father's maternal cousin the Hereditary Prince of Saxe-Coburg and Gotha, her maternal uncle Walther L. Sommerlath, her father's paternal cousin Princess Benedikte of Denmark, and her paternal aunt Princess Christina, Mrs. Magnuson. Madeleine was given the honorary title of Duchess of Hälsingland and Gästrikland. It was the first time since the early 17th century (when such titles were still more than honorary) that a Swedish ducal title included more than one province. Both Hälsingland and Gästrikland are encompassed by Gävleborg County.

== Education ==
From 1985 to 1989, Madeleine began her education at Västerled Parish Pre-School. In the autumn of 1989, she entered Smedslättsskolan in Bromma, attending at the junior level. For the intermediate level, she proceeded to Carlssons School in Stockholm, and then went on to Enskilda Gymnasiet in Stockholm, which she attended at the senior level. She also completed upper secondary school at Enskilda, from which she graduated in 2001. During the autumn of 2001, she lived in London, where she studied English. In the spring of 2002, she took a basic module in Introduction to Swedish Law and studied for the European Computer Driving Licence. In January 2003, she enrolled at the Stockholm University where she began studies in art history. She took 60 Swedish academic units in this subject (two semesters). In the autumn of 2004, she began a course in ethnology at the same university. She speaks English, German and Swedish fluently, and also intermediate-level French. She graduated 23 January 2006 with a Bachelor of Arts in art history, ethnology and modern history. During 2007, she studied child psychology at Stockholm University.

== Leisure pursuits ==
Madeleine is an enthusiastic equestrian. She has owned horses (which were stabled at the Royal Stables) and competed in showjumping under the name "Anna Svensson". She also enjoys skiing, and is interested in theatre, dance and art. In recognition of her age of majority in 2001, a scholarship fund was created in her name by the Gävleborg County, which comprises her duchies of Hälsingland and Gästrikland. It encourages and supports young people involved in horse riding. In 2001, Madeleine first distributed such awards as 'Pony Rider of the Year with trainer in Gävleborg' and 'Gold Rider'.

== Activities ==
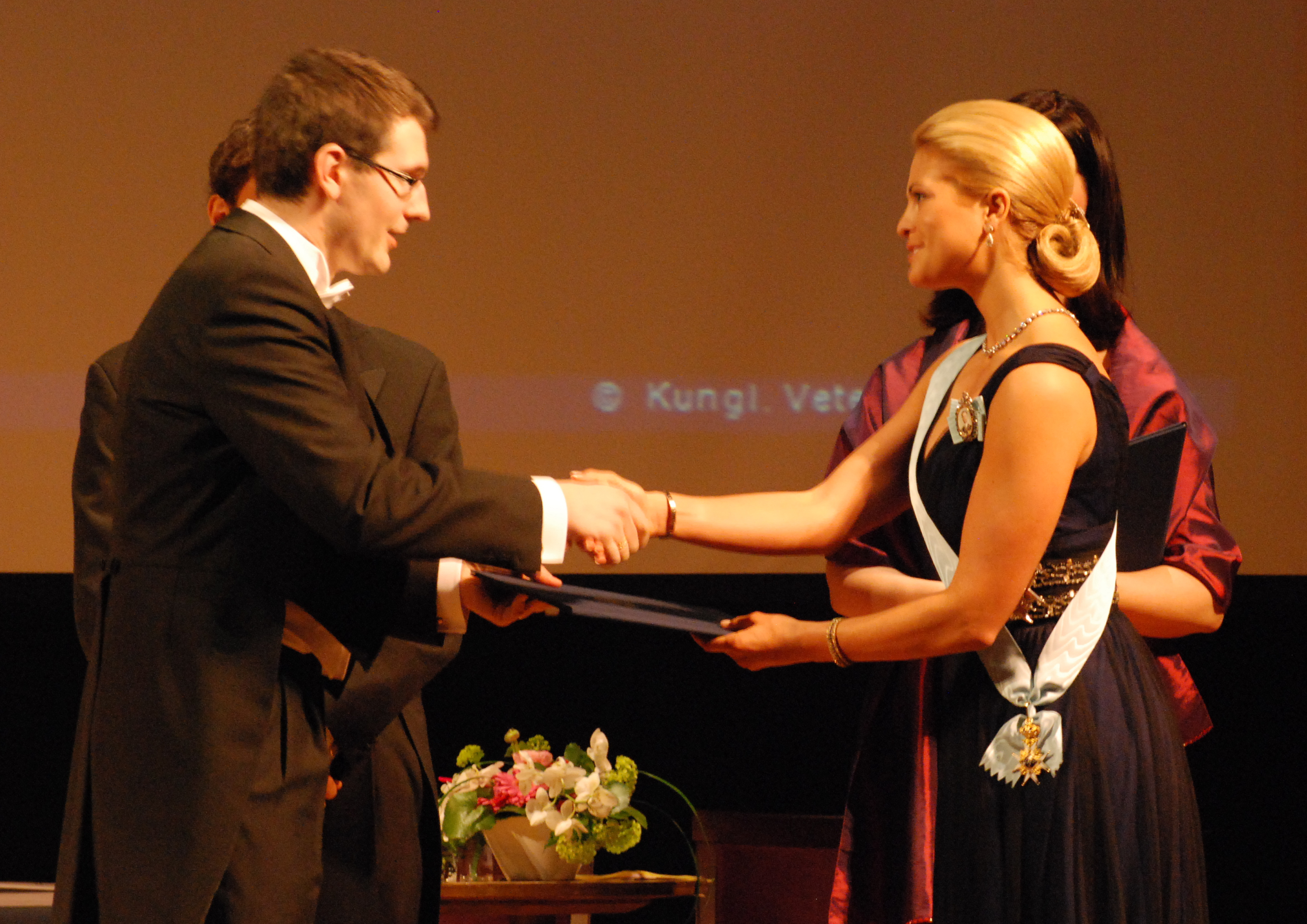
Madeleine handing the Göran Gustafsson Prize to Johan Elf in 2010.

Madeleine undertakes various engagements on behalf of her father and the people of Sweden. She participates in the celebrations of Sweden's National Day, the Nobel festivities, dinners and state visits with other members of the royal family. She represented Sweden at the opening of the New Sweden Gallery on 5 June 2011, at the American Swedish Historical Museum in Philadelphia, Pennsylvania, which features an animated map of the New Sweden settlement by Sean Moir.

From 25 October to 1 November 2024, Madeleine temporarily acted as Regent Ad Interim. This is because her father the King was traveling to Brazil together with Crown Princess Victoria and Prince Carl Philip, leaving Madeleine as the closest in line to the throne remaining in Sweden.

=== Charity work ===
==== Patronages and interests ====
Madeleine is the patron of the organisation Min Stora Dag (the Swedish equivalent of Make-A-Wish Foundation), more commonly known as My Big Day (its translation into English). She is also affiliated with Europa Nostra, Carl Johan-League and the Royal Motorboat Club.

==== Victims of child exploitation ====
In 2006, Princess Madeleine interned for UNICEF for six months in New York City and worked for the division of Child Protective Services. In 2012, she co-founded the ThankYou by Childhood campaign which works to raise awareness of the issues surrounding the sexual abuse of children and the work the World Childhood Foundation does to prevent it. Princess Madeleine became involved in the work of the World Childhood Foundation during her studies. She became one of the juries of the Childhood Prize. She serves on the board of Swedish branch and is an honorary member of the board of the American branch of the World Childhood Foundation since 2016. She became the vice honorary chair of the World Childhood Foundation in December 2021. Her first visit as a vice honorary chair was in July 2022 when the Princess visited Frankfurt, Germany. There, she visited the German branch of the World Childhood Foundation, construction of Child House and met a former child sexual abuse victim. She also visited Frankfurt University Hospital and toured the hospital's children department to meet with doctors to learn about their work.

In 2015, the Princess initiated the #EyesWideOpen campaign. It aims to increase the awareness about the sexual abuse of children. In conjunction with a high-level meeting in New York City in the autumn of 2016, the Princess presented the continuation of the campaign – an app that makes it easier for adults to prevent, recognise and react to sexual abuse and exploitation of children. The app is a collaboration between the World Childhood Foundation, Darkness to Light and Ericsson. In February 2017, the Princess announced she was writing a children's book during a visit to London's Southbank Centre. On 28 January 2019, the Princess shared the book's title and cover via Instagram. She wrote: "I'm very excited to finally share with you a book which will hopefully show children how important it is to stand up for themselves and to tell someone when something doesn't feel right." The book titled Stella och hemligheten (English: Stella and the Secret) was published in support of the World Childhood Foundation and was released on 4 June 2019.

== Personal life ==
=== First engagement ===
Madeleine announced her engagement to lawyer Jonas Bergström (b. 1979) in August 2009. She said in her engagement interview that they became engaged in Capri in early June that year. An engagement dinner took place on the engagement day in Solliden Palace on Öland. The engagement could only take place after Bergström had been awarded the official approval of the Swedish Cabinet Regeringen and that had been communicated to her father, the King.

The wedding was originally due to take place in the second half of 2010 but was postponed due to "many things happening in an intense period of time", mainly her sister Victoria's wedding in June. Queen Silvia denied the rumoured relationship issues. However, media reporting of the relationship issues escalated, and on 24 April 2010 it was announced that the wedding would not go ahead, and the engagement was broken off.

=== Marriage and children ===
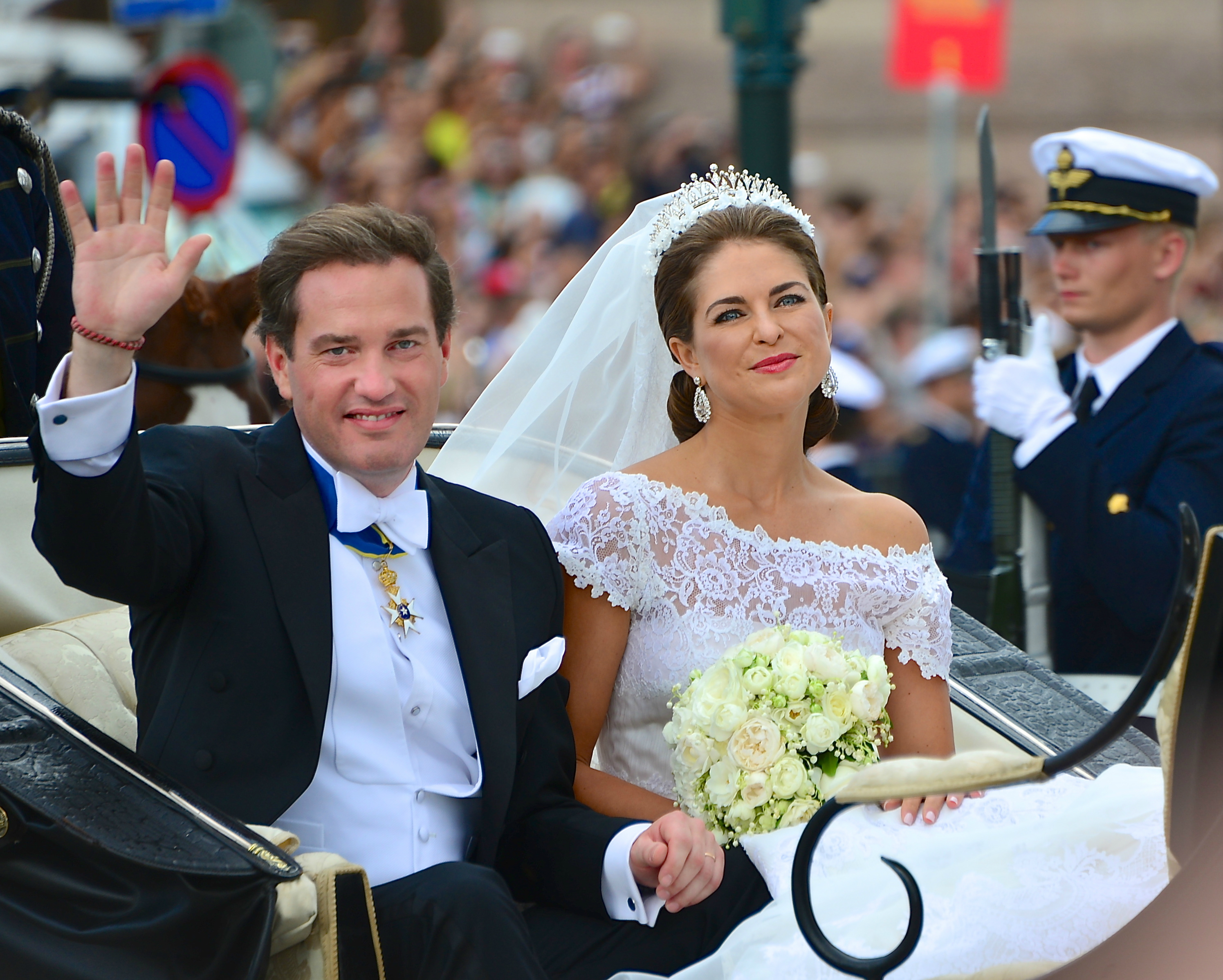
Princess Madeleine and Christopher O'Neill following their wedding.

On 25 October 2012, the Swedish Royal Court announced Princess Madeleine's engagement with the British-born American financier Christopher O'Neill. On 23 December 2012, it was announced that the wedding would take place on 8 June 2013, at the Royal Palace chapel in Stockholm. O'Neill chose to remain untitled, as members of the Swedish royal family must hold Swedish citizenship, which O'Neill declined.

The couple has three children:

- Princess Leonore Lilian Maria, Duchess of Gotland, born on 20 February 2014 at Weill Cornell Medical Center in New York City.
- Prince Nicolas Paul Gustaf, Duke of Ångermanland, born on 15 June 2015 at Danderyds sjukhus in Danderyd Municipality, Stockholm.
- Princess Adrienne Josephine Alice, Duchess of Blekinge, born on 9 March 2018 at Danderyds sjukhus in Danderyd Municipality, Stockholm. She was baptised at Drottningholm Palace Chapel on 8 June 2018.

In February 2015, the Swedish Royal Court announced that the family had moved to Stockholm from New York. In May 2015, the Swedish Royal Court announced that O'Neill had moved to London in April. In Autumn 2015, several months after the birth of Prince Nicolas, the entire family moved to London, where O'Neill's business is located. In August 2018, the Swedish Royal Court announced that the princess and her family would move to Florida. In March 2023, it was announced that the family would move back to Sweden in August 2023. In June 2023, it was announced that the move has been postponed until 2024.

On 7 October 2019, the king issued a statement rescinding the royal status of her three children in an effort to more strictly associate Swedish royalty to the office of the head of state; they are no longer styled as His/Her Royal Highness (HRH), but their princely titles remain and they are still duchesses and duke of their provinces, remaining in the line of succession to the throne. Madeleine commented that her children now will have greater possibilities to shape their own lives as private individuals.

== Honours ==
Styles of Princess Madeleine, Duchess of Hälsingland and Gästrikland
- Reference style: Her Royal Highness
- Spoken style: Your Royal Highness

Princess Madeleine's monogram.

=== Swedish honours ===
- Sweden:
  - Member and Commander of the Royal Order of the Seraphim (LoKavKMO)
  - Member of the Royal Family Decoration of King Carl XVI Gustaf
  - Recipient of the Ruby Jubilee Badge Medal of King Carl XVI Gustaf
  - Recipient of the Wedding Medal of Crown Princess Victoria to Daniel Westling
  - Recipient of the 50th Birthday Badge Medal of King Carl XVI Gustaf
  - Recipient of the 70th Birthday Badge Medal of King Carl XVI Gustaf
  - Recipient of the Golden Jubilee Badge Medal of King Carl XVI Gustaf
  - Recipient of the King Carl XVI Gustaf and Queen Silvia's Golden Wedding Medal

=== Foreign honours ===
- Bulgaria: Member 1st Class of the Order of the Balkan Mountains
- Brazil: Grand Cross of the Order of Rio Branco
- Germany: Grand Cross of the Order of Merit of the Federal Republic of Germany
- Greece: Grand Cross of the Order of Honour
- Iceland: Grand Cross of the Order of the Falcon
- Japan: Grand Cordon of the Order of the Precious Crown
- Jordan: Grand Cordon of the Order of the Star of Jordan
- Latvia: Grand Officer of the Order of the Three Stars
- Luxembourg: Grand Cross of the Order of Adolphe of Nassau
- Malaysia: Honorary Commander of the Order of Loyalty to the Crown of Malaysia
- Norway: Grand Cross of the Order of St. Olav
- Romania: Grand Cross of the Order of Faithful Service

=== Award ===
- Sweden: Honorary Grand Cross of the Social Order of Innocence

== Bibliography ==
=== Books ===
- Bernadotte, Madeleine; Gustafson-Teixeira, Karini; Oskarsson, Marie (4 June 2019). Stella och hemligheten. Illustrated by Stina Lövkvist. Bonnier Carlsen. ISBN 9789178031726.

Princess Madeleine, Duchess of Hälsingland and Gästrikland House of Bernadotte Born: 10 June 1982
Lines of succession
Preceded by Princess Ines	Succession to the Swedish throne 9th in line	Succeeded by Princess Leonore
