= Christopher O'Neill =

British-American businessperson and spouse of Swedish princess

Herr Christopher O'Neill KNO
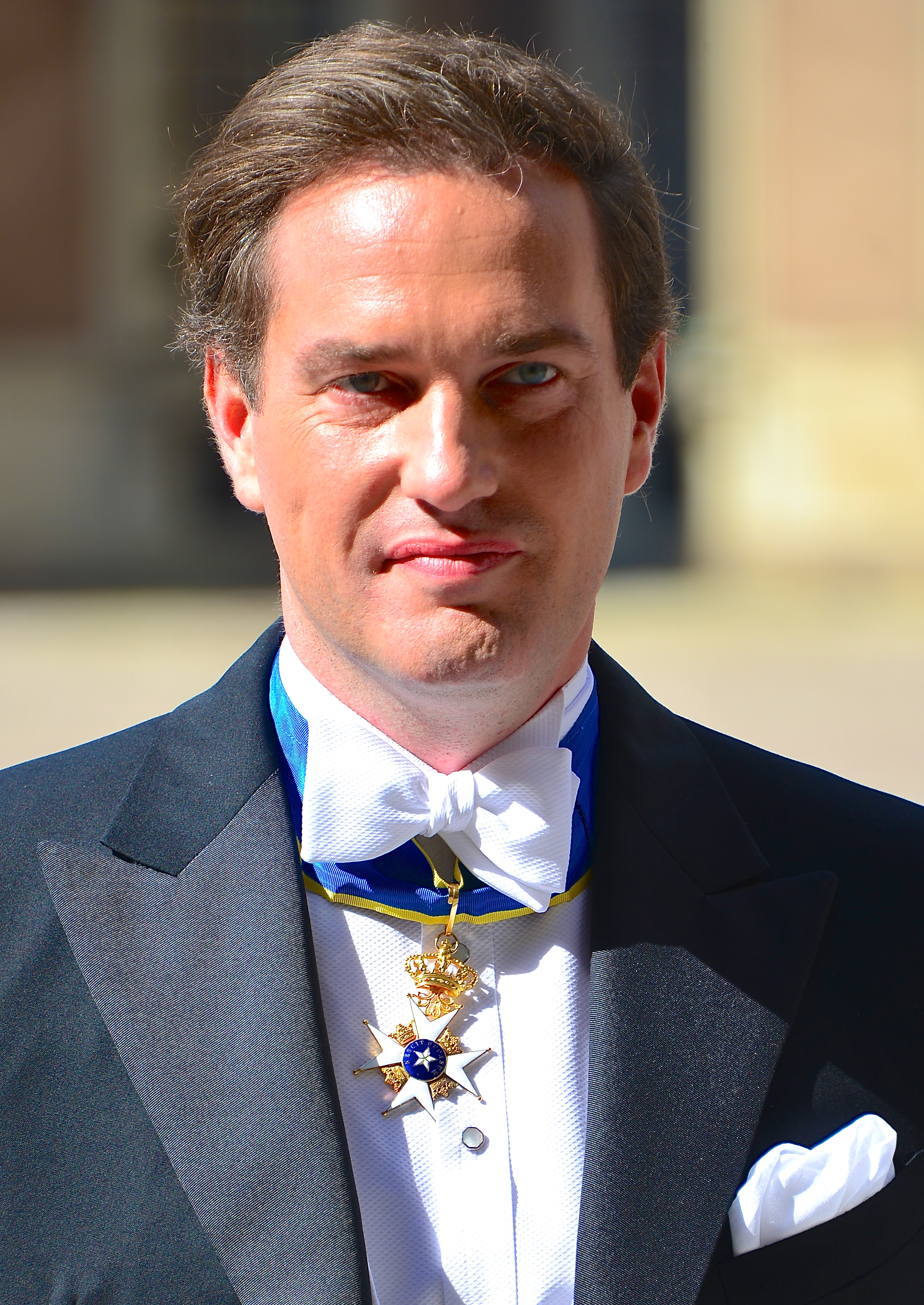
- O'Neill on his wedding day, 8 June 2013
- Born: Christopher Paul O'Neill; 27 June 1974 (age 52); London, England
- Education: Boston University (BA); Columbia Business School (MBA)
- Spouse: Princess Madeleine, Duchess of Hälsingland and Gästrikland (m. 2013)
- Children: 3
- Parents: Paul Cesario O'Neill (father); Eva Maria Walter (mother)

Christopher Paul O'Neill, KNO (born 27 June 1974) is a British-American financier and husband of Princess Madeleine, Duchess of Hälsingland and Gästrikland, with whom he has three children. He declined to become a Swedish citizen and accept any titles; he could then continue as a businessman with no royal duties.

== Early life ==
O'Neill was born in London to Paul Cesario O'Neill (1926–2004), an American investment banker who came to London in the 1960s to set up the European head office of Oppenheimer & Co. His mother is Eva Maria O'Neill (née Walter). O'Neill has two half-sisters on his mother's side: Tatjana d'Abo and Countess Natascha von Abensberg und Traun, and three on his father's side: Stefanie, Annalisa and Karen. He grew up in London, St. Gallen, Austria and Germany, and holds dual American and British citizenship.

== Education and career ==
O'Neill was educated at Eaton House and Westminster Under School in London, Institut auf dem Rosenberg in St. Gallen, Switzerland, and graduated with a BA degree in International Relations from Boston University. He also obtained an MBA from Columbia Business School in New York City. He was a partner and head of research at Noster Capital and former employee of NM Rothschild and Sons and Steinberg Asset Management. His marriage to a Swedish princess necessitated that, if he continued with Noster Capital, the fund would have to divest entirely from companies that traded on the Stockholm Stock Exchange and, moreover, divest from any company which had more than a third of its sales in Sweden. O'Neill resigned from Noster Capital in consequence of these demands.

== Marriage and family ==
The first time Princess Madeleine and O'Neill appeared publicly together was in January 2011. Their engagement was announced in an official interview on 25 October 2012, and in late April 2013, it was announced that their wedding would take place on 8 June 2013 at the Royal Chapel, Stockholm Palace, and be followed by dinner at the Swedish royal family's residence, Drottningholm Palace.

Unlike his brother-in-law Prince Daniel and his sister-in-law Princess Sofia, O'Neill is untitled and undertakes no royal duties, since members of the Swedish royal family must hold Swedish citizenship, which O'Neill has declined. The Royal Court refers to him in Swedish as Herr Christopher O'Neill, a form of title which is not normally used (it would normally be herr). Thus, remaining a private citizen, he can continue his career in finance.

Their daughter, Princess Leonore, was born in New York on 20 February 2014. Their second child, Prince Nicolas, was born in Stockholm on 15 June 2015. On 9 March 2018, their second daughter, Princess Adrienne, was born at Danderyd Hospital, Stockholm.

In February 2015, the Swedish Royal Court announced that the family had moved to Stockholm from New York. In May 2015, the Swedish Royal Court announced that O'Neill had moved to London in April. In Autumn 2015, several months after the birth of Prince Nicolas, the entire family moved to London, where O'Neill's business is located. In August 2018, the Swedish Royal Court announced that the O'Neill family was moving to Florida.

== Distinctions ==
His father-in-law, King Carl XVI Gustaf, conferred upon O'Neill:

- Commander of the Royal Order of the Polar Star (KNO) (6 June 2013).
- Recipient of the Commemorative Ruby Jubilee Medal of King Carl XVI Gustaf (15 September 2013).
- Recipient of the 70th Birthday Badge Medal of King Carl XVI Gustaf (30 April 2016).
- Recipient of the Golden Jubilee Badge Medal of King Carl XVI Gustaf (15 September 2023).

=== Foreign honours ===
- Iceland: Grand Knight's Cross of the Order of the Falcon (6 May 2025)
