= Princess Sofia, Duchess of Värmland =

Member of the Swedish royal family (born 1984)

Princess Sofia
- Duchess of Värmland
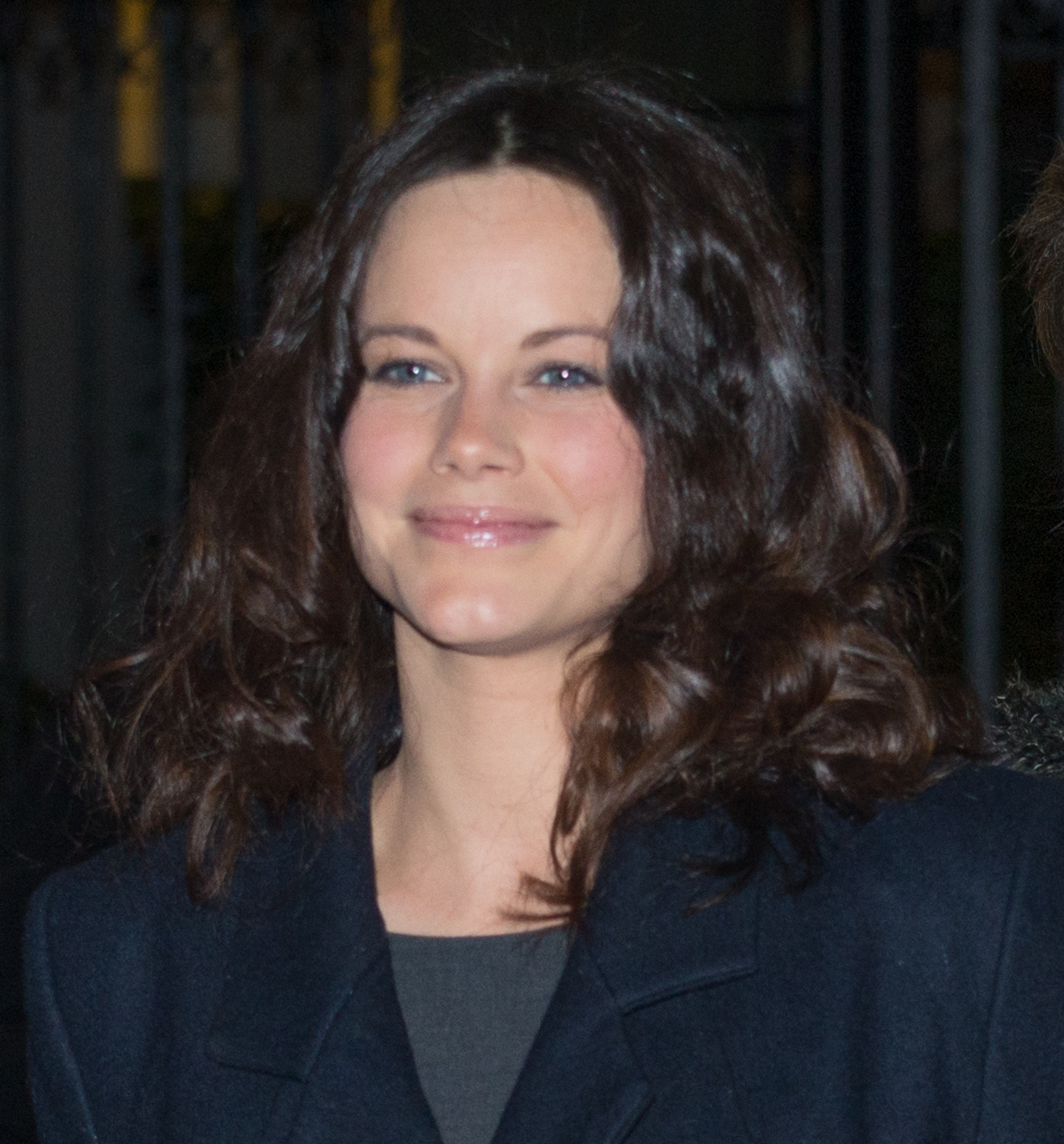
- Princess Sofia in 2016
- Born: Sofia Kristina Hellqvist; 6 December 1984 (age 41); Danderyd Hospital, Danderyd, Sweden
- Spouse: Prince Carl Philip, Duke of Värmland (m. 2015)
- Issue: Prince Alexander, Duke of Södermanland; Prince Gabriel, Duke of Dalarna; Prince Julian, Duke of Halland; Princess Ines, Duchess of Västerbotten
- House: Bernadotte (by marriage)
- Father: Erik Oscar Hellqvist
- Mother: Marie Britt Rotman

Princess Sofia, Duchess of Värmland (born Sofia Kristina Hellqvist, 6 December 1984), is a member of the Swedish royal family. Before marrying Prince Carl Philip in 2015 and becoming a princess of Sweden, Sofia was a glamour model and reality television contestant. They have four children, Prince Alexander, Prince Gabriel, Prince Julian and Princess Ines, who are fifth, sixth, seventh, and eighth in the line of succession to the Swedish throne, respectively.

== Early life and education ==
Sofia Kristina Hellqvist was born on 6 December 1984 at Danderyd Hospital in Danderyd, to a Swedish mother, Marie Britt Rotman (born 1957), a marketing manager in the plastics industry, and a Danish-Swedish father, Erik Oscar Hellqvist (born 1949), an employment counsellor at the Swedish employment agency. She was baptised on 26 May 1985 in Tibble Church. She moved to Älvdalen at the age of six. She has two sisters, Lina Hellqvist (a humanitarian project coordinator, born 1982) and Sara Hellqvist (a criminologist, born 1988). She attended Älvdalen Montessori School and Älvdal School. She studied the arts programme at Vansbro Education Centre.

== Career ==
At the age of 20, Hellqvist was published in photos in the men's magazine Slitz wearing only a bikini bottom and a live boa constrictor around her upper body and was later voted Miss Slitz 2004 by readers. Expressen republished the photos in 2010 after her relationship with Prince Carl Philip was confirmed. Hellqvist was subsequently cast in the Paradise Hotel reality show on TV4 where she made it to the final. Hellqvist was mentioned in some newspapers for having kissed American adult film star Jenna Jameson while in Las Vegas to film the show. She had a much publicised feud with co-star Olinda Castielle and finally voted Castielle off the show.

In 2005, she moved to New York to study accounting, specialising in business development while working as a certified yoga instructor. While working in New York, she met American financier Jeffrey Epstein on a few occasions around 2005, before he was convicted of soliciting prostitution, including with a minor, in 2008. Leaked emails by Dagens Nyheter showed correspondence between Epstein and Swedish financier Barbro Ehnbom, a mentor figure who introduced Hellqvist to him. A 2005 email showed Epstein inviting her to his Caribbean estate, an offer the Swedish royal court said she declined. Documents released in January 2026 by the US authorities showed that Ehnbom had sent a 2010 photograph of Sofia to Epstein and that she had been invited to a private Broadway screening in New York in 2012 as Epstein's guest.

After relocating back to Sweden, Hellqvist studied global ethics, child and youth science, children's communication and the UN Convention on the Rights of the Child in theory, and in Swedish practice at Stockholm University. She also worked part-time as a waitress and glamour model.

== Marriage and motherhood ==
In July 2010, the Swedish Royal Court confirmed the relationship between Sofia Hellqvist and Prince Carl Philip. In April 2011, the couple moved in together in Djurgården of Stockholm, which was confirmed by the palace.

On 27 June 2014, the couple's engagement was announced, and in December, Hellqvist made an appearance at the Nobel Banquet with her future husband. In May 2015, it was announced that she would receive the title of princess. The couple married at Slottskyrkan in Stockholm on 13 June 2015.

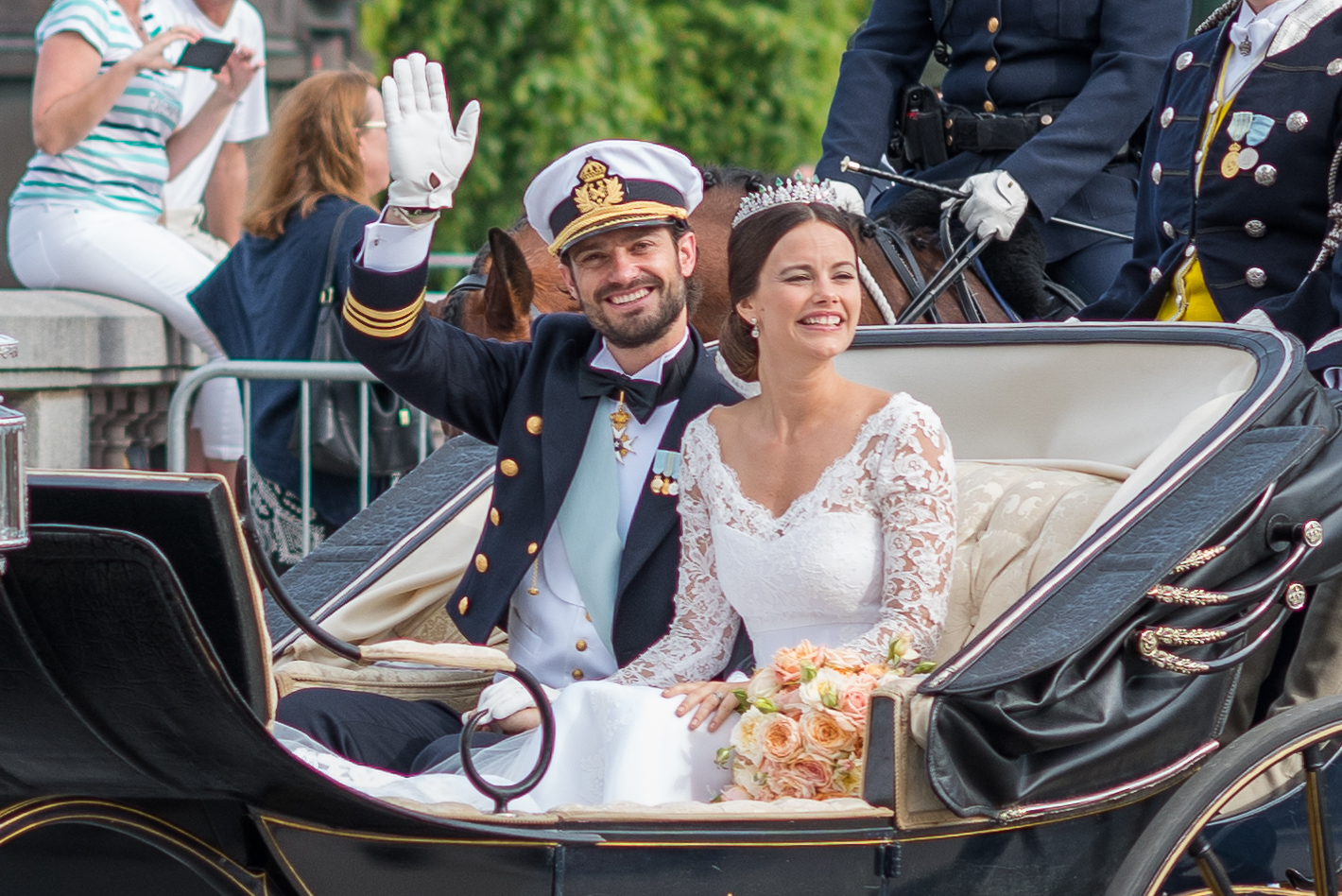
Sofia and Carl Philip on their wedding day

On 19 April 2016, Sofia gave birth to their first child, Prince Alexander Erik Hubertus Bertil, Duke of Södermanland. Their second child, Prince Gabriel Carl Walther, Duke of Dalarna, was born on 31 August 2017. Their third child, Prince Julian Herbert Folke, Duke of Halland, was born on 26 March 2021. Their fourth child, a daughter, Princess Ines Marie Lilian Silvia, Duchess of Västerbotten, was born on 7 February 2025. All four children were born at Danderyd Hospital.

On 7 October 2019, Sofia's father-in-law, the king, issued a statement rescinding the royal status of Prince Alexander and Prince Gabriel in an effort to more strictly associate Swedish royalty to the office of the head of state; they are still to be styled as princes and dukes of their provinces, and they remain in the line of succession to the throne. Sofia and Carl Philip commented that their sons now will have more freedom of choice for their future lives.

== Charity work ==
In 2010, Hellqvist was one of the co-founders of non-profit organisation Project Playground, a charity that assists underprivileged children in South Africa. Princess Sofia is the honorary chair.

To mark the occasion of Prince Carl Philip and Princess Sofia's marriage in 2015, the couple founded Prince Carl Philip and Princess Sofia's Foundation. The foundation's purpose is to counteract bullying.

Princess Sofia is an honorary chair of Sophiahemmet since 2016. She succeeded Princess Christina, Mrs. Magnuson, who had been honorary chair since 1972.

In April 2020, the Princess completed a three-day emergency online training course from Sophiahemmet University, created to help hospitals amidst the COVID-19 pandemic. It was announced that she would work as a volunteer at the Sophiahemmet Hospital in Stockholm, where she would support "doctors and nurses through kitchen shifts, disinfecting instruments and cleaning."

== Honours ==
Styles of Princess Sofia, The Duchess of Värmland
- Reference style: Her Royal Highness
- Spoken style: Your Royal Highness

Princess Sofia's monogram.

=== National ===
- Sweden:
  - Member and Commander of the Royal Order of the Seraphim
  - Member of the Royal Family Decoration of King Carl XVI Gustaf
  - Recipient of the 70th Birthday Medal of King Carl XVI Gustaf
  - Recipient of the Golden Jubilee Medal of King Carl XVI Gustaf

=== Foreign ===
- Chile: Grand Cross of the Order of Bernardo O'Higgins (10 May 2016)
- Finland: Grand Cross of the Order of the White Rose of Finland (17 May 2022)
- France: Grand Officer of the Order of the Legion of Honour (30 January 2024)
- Germany: Grand Cross 1st Class of the Order of Merit of the Federal Republic of Germany (7 September 2021)
- Iceland: Grand Cross of the Order of the Falcon (17 January 2018)
- Italy: Knight Grand Cross of the Order of Merit of the Italian Republic (2 November 2018)
- Netherlands: Grand Cross of the Order of the Crown (11 October 2022)
- Spain: Dame Grand Cross of the Order of Civil Merit (16 November 2021)
