= Carl Mörner =

Carl Mörner may refer to:

- Carl Otto Mörner (1781–1868), Swedish courtier and member of the Diet
- Carl Carlsson Mörner (1755–1821, Swedish nobleman, officer, and politician
