= Principality of Pontecorvo =

Italian commune

Principality of Pontecorvo Principato di Pontecorvo (Italian)
- 1806–1815
- Coat of arms of Bernadotte

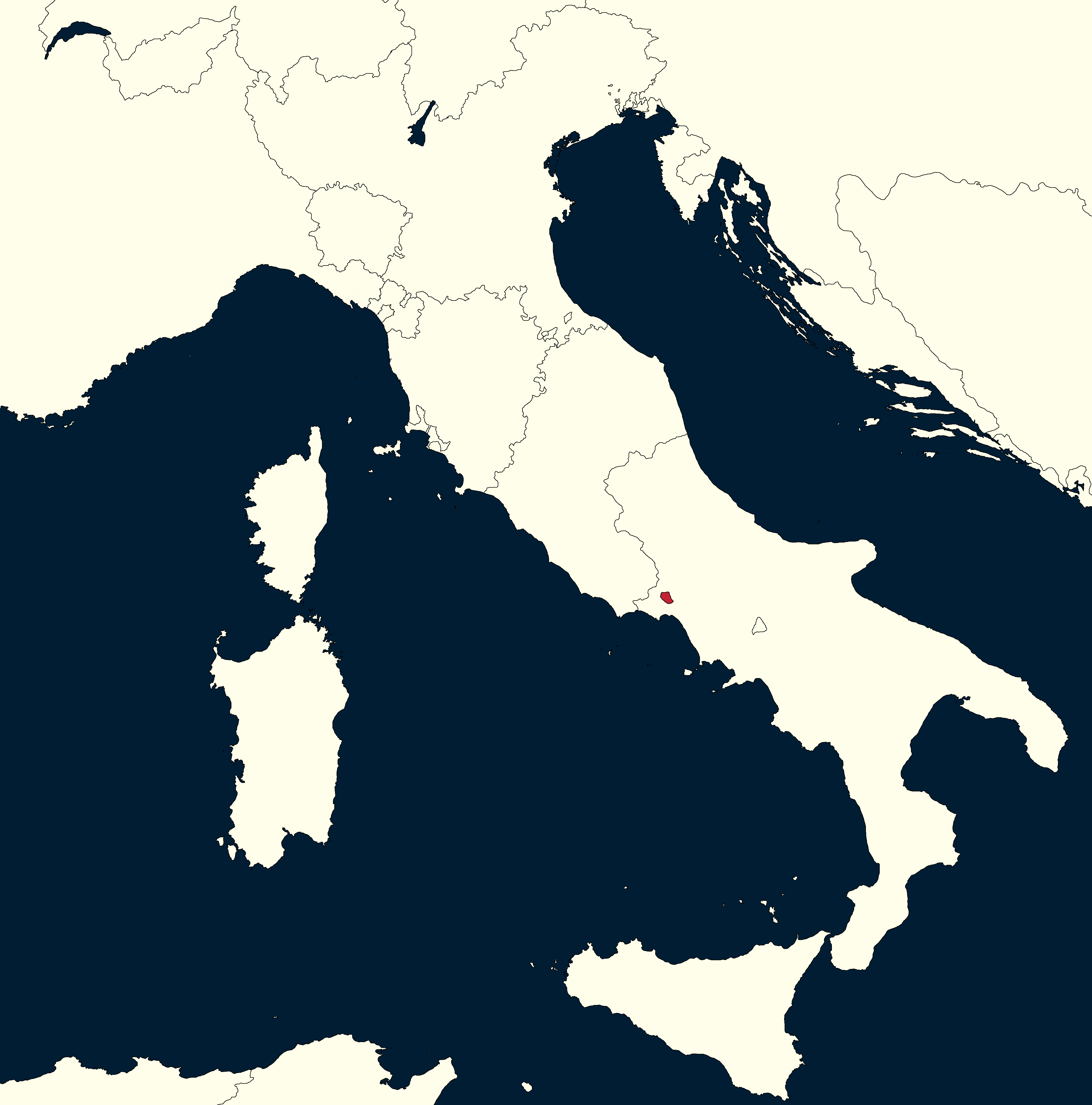
- Status: Client state
- Capital: Pontecorvo
- Government: Principality
  - Prince: Jean Bernadotte (1806–1810); Lucien Murat (1812–1815)
- Historical era: Napoleonic Wars
  - Creation: 28 August 1806
  - Restored to papal control: 28 August 1815
Preceded by	Succeeded by
Papal States	Papal States

The Principality of Pontecorvo was a principality in Italy created by Napoleon after he became King of Italy in 1805. It consisted of the Italian commune of Pontecorvo, an exclave of the Papal States from 1463 within the territory of the Kingdom of Naples.

The principality was created by Napoleon for Marshal of the Empire Jean-Baptiste Bernadotte. It was nominally sovereign, but the prince did have to take an oath to Napoleon as king of Italy.

The principality was short-lived. In 1815, after the Napoleonic Wars, the town was ceded back to the Papal States.

In 1820, the so-called Republic of Pontecorvo seceded from the Papal States, but papal rule was restored in March 1821.

In 1860, it joined Benevento, the other southern Italian papal exclave, in being united with the new Kingdom of Italy.

== Princes of Pontecorvo ==
=== Jean-Baptiste Jules Bernadotte (1806–10) ===
Jean-Baptiste Jules Bernadotte was the first Prince of Pontecorvo and was as such styled Prince Bernadotte. He was subsequently elected Crown Prince of Sweden and then agreed to give up Pontecorvo, but under conditions that never were resolved. He was partially compensated with the French colony of Guadeloupe. Later, he gave up Guadeloupe for a payment which established the Guadeloupe Fund. Since his accession as King of Sweden in 1818, the arms of Pontecorvo have been a part of the Swedish Greater Coat of Arms.

=== Prince Napoleon Lucien Charles Murat (1812–15) ===
Prince Napoleon Lucien Charles Murat was the son of Joachim Murat, King of Naples. Though the reign of the Murat family over Pontecorvo lasted only three years and ended in 1815, the descendants of Prince Lucien still unofficially use "Prince of Pontecorvo" as the courtesy title of the heir to the Prince Murat. It is currently used by Joachim Murat, who was born in 1973.
