= Luke Spicola of Pontecorvo =

Italian Catholic priest

Servant of God Luca Spicola OP
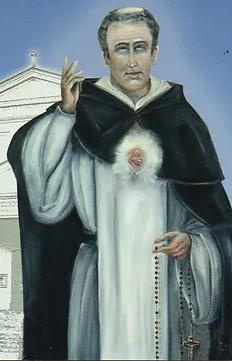
- Born: c. 1425; Pontecorvo, Frosinone, Italy
- Died: 1490 (aged 64–65); Pontecorvo, Frosinone, Italy
- Venerated in: Roman Catholic Church
- Feast: 22 April
- Attributes: Dominican habit Rosary

Luke Spicola (c. 1425 – 1490) was an Italian Catholic priest belonging to the Order of Friars Preachers.

== Life ==
Luca Spicola was born about 1425, in Pontecorvo. He soon began to attend the local Dominican convent of the "Santissima Maria Annunziata" and at a young age received the religious habit.

In 1454 he moved to Naples to the Convent of San Domenico Maggiore of which he had become Prior. He also stayed for some time in Gaeta. Later he received an invitation, apparently from some nobles of Pontecorvo, to return to his native city as Prior of the convent of "Santissima Maria Annunziata", where he had been ordained. After an initial refusal, Friar Luca accepted the assignment and moved back to Pontecorvo.

As the new Prior of his old convent, which at that time was made up of a church and a hospital, he worked to enlarge and improve the structure of the convent at a considerable expense. Fra' Luca Spicola died in Pontecorvo in 1490.

== Veneration ==
According to one account, he was buried in the cloister of the convent of San Domenico Maggiore in Naples, where he had been Prior. According to the version of Teodoro Valle, he was initially buried at the convent of Pontecorvo, where he died, but then he was moved to Gaeta, by decision of the then Prior of the convent of Pontecorvo, who was originally from that city. His relics remained for some time at the convent of Gaeta until the invasion of the French when they were then moved to a secret place, together with the silverware and the documents of the convent. Since then, every trace of them has been lost.

According to tradition, several miracles are attributed to Luca Spicola. The Holy See, through the efforts of the Provincial Fathers of the Dominican Order, officially recognized the virtues of Spicola, issuing a decree to have him beatied, though no official beatification took place.

In the convent in Naples, there is a painting depicting his image, in the refectory. The veneration of Blessed Luke was maintained at least until the middle of the nineteenth century, and his memory was celebrated on April 22 (which perhaps corresponded to his day of birth).

== Sources ==
- Marco Sbardella, “Il Beato Luca Spicola di Pontecorvo in un’inedita elegia dell’arcade Pietro Pellisieri”, Studi Cassinati. Bollettino trimestrale di studi storici del Lazio meridionale, III, 2003 pp. 64–68;
- Pasquale Cayro, Storia Sacra, e profana d'Aquino, e sua Diocesi, Napoli, 1808
- P. Centi, Un figlio illustre di Pontecorvo: il Beato Luca Spicola, La Lucerna, 1961
- Bonanni R., Uomini illustri di Aquino e diocesi, Alatri, 1923
- Theodore Valle, "Breve Compendio degli più illustri padri nella vita, dignità, uffici e lettere ch'ha prodotto la Prou.del Regno di Nap.dell'Ord.de Predic. diviso in cinque parti fino al presente anno".– 1651
