= Guadeloupe Fund =

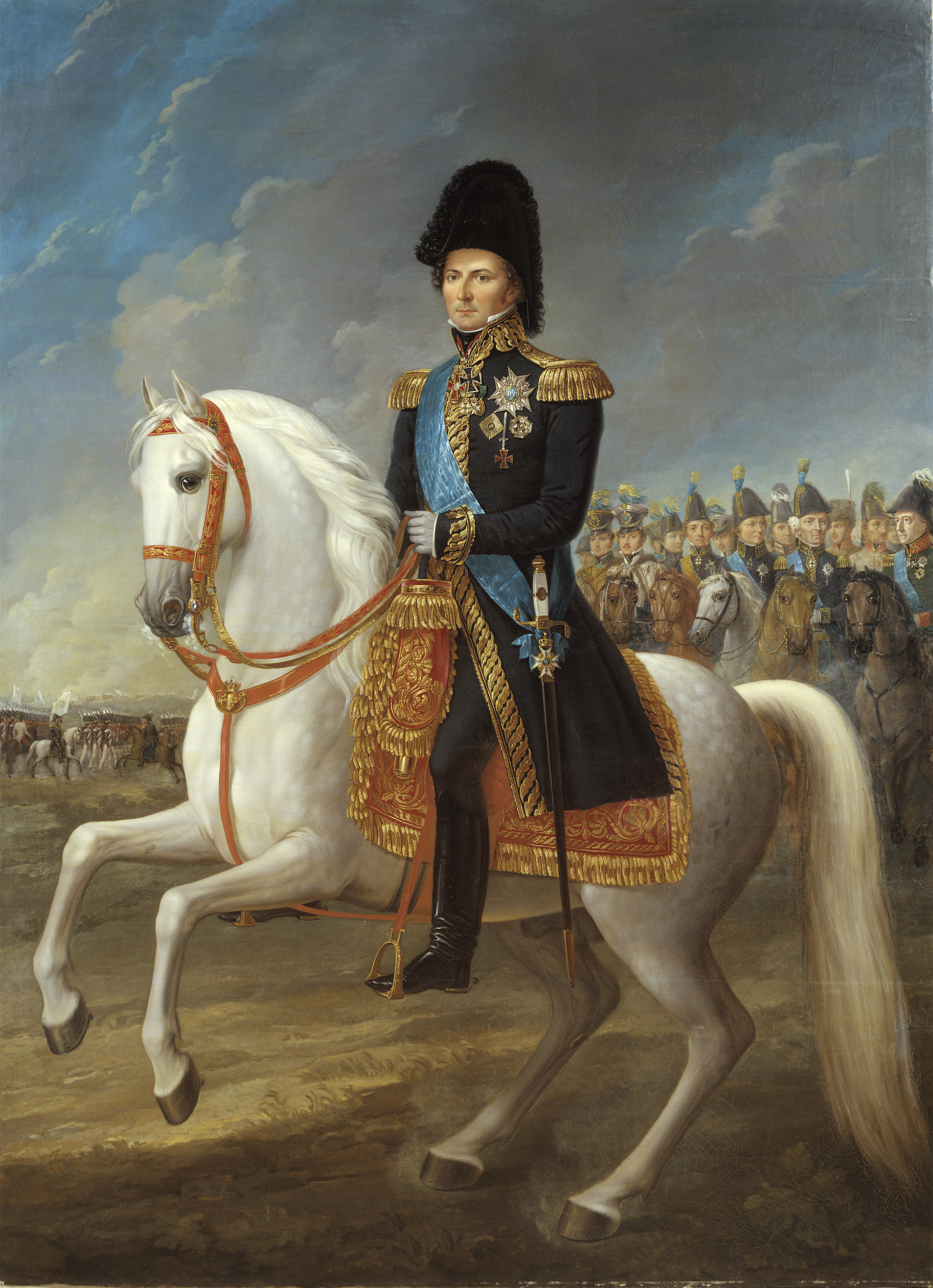
A posthumous portrait of Charles XIV John

The Guadeloupe Fund (Swedish: Guadeloupefonden) was established by Sweden's Riksdag of the Estates in 1815 for the benefit of Crown Prince and Regent Charles XIV John (Swedish: Karl XIV Johan), also known as Jean-Baptiste Jules Bernadotte, and his heirs.

Bernadotte had been one of the most successful soldiers in Napoleon's army. He was a Marshal of France, former minister of war and had been created Prince of Pontecorvo by Napoleon, before accepting the election as Crown Prince and heir to the Swedish throne. Under his adoptive father, the reigning and yet powerless King Charles XIII of Sweden, Crown Prince Charles John was effectively the regent of the country, and when Sweden sided with Napoleon's enemies, Charles John came to be seen as a traitor to his native France. Upon Sweden's accession to the Sixth Coalition, Britain's offer of an island in the West Indies was an attempt to, in some way, compensate for this.

In 1810, British forces captured the island of Guadeloupe from the French. It was conveniently located in proximity to the Swedish colony of Saint Barthélemy. On 3 March 1813, Guadeloupe was ceded by Britain to Sweden, which was done in order to keep the Swedish Crown Prince "at least partially compensated for the donations and other property, which he had lost since being called to the succession of the Swedish throne", having also used proceeds of sales of his Italian and French property to pay off debts of Sweden and losses as a consequence of Sweden's involvement in the Napoleonic Wars.

After France had been defeated and Napoleon exiled to Elba, the 1814 Treaty of Paris settled the terms of the peace, in which Guadeloupe, having previously been a French possession, was returned to France. On 13 August 1814, a settlement of 24 million French francs was given by Britain to Sweden as a replacement for the intended compensation. The Crown Prince, acting as regent, used about half of the sum to pay off government debts; the rest went to various projects of public benefit. In recognition of this, the Riksdag of 1815 instituted that the Crown Prince and his heirs would receive an annual installment of 300,000 Riksdaler, which was to be paid out in perpetuity.

In the middle of the 20th century the scheme came under close scrutiny. Following a settlement between Britain and the House of Bernadotte, the last payment of the fund was made in 1983 after a decision of the parliament on 14 April 1982.

== See also ==
- Possessions of Sweden
- History of Sweden
- History of Guadeloupe

== Other sources ==
- Calloway, Colin G. (2006) The Scratch of a Pen: 1763 and the Transformation of North America (Oxford University Press) ISBN 978-0195331271
- Höjer, Torvald (1943) Carl XIV Johan: Kronprinstiden (Stockholm: Nordstedts Förlag)
- Knight, Franklin W. (1997) General History of the Caribbean (UNESCO) ISBN 9789231031465
