= Carl Otto Mörner =

Swedish courtier (1781–1868)

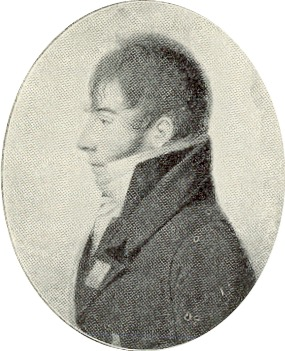
- Carl Otto Mörner (from Hildebrand, Sveriges historia)
- Born: 22 May 1781; Uppsala
- Died: 17 August 1868 (aged 87); Vaxholm
- Occupations: courtier and member of the Diet

Baron Carl Otto Mörner (22 May 1781 – 17 August 1868) was a Swedish courtier, and member of the Diet. He is chiefly remembered for his role in advocating for Frenchman Jean Baptiste Bernadotte's succession to the Swedish crown in 1810.

== Role in the succession to Charles XIII of Sweden ==
In 1810 King Charles XIII of Sweden was childless and the crown prince Charles August had died of a stroke. Baron Mörner was then a lieutenant in the Uppland Regiment. Entirely on his own initiative, Mörner offered the succession to the Swedish crown to Bernadotte (thus becoming known as Kingmaker). Although the Swedish government, amazed at Mörner's effrontery, placed him under arrest, the candidature of Bernadotte gradually gained favor. On 21 August 1810 in Örebro, Bernadotte was elected by the Riksdag of the Estates to be the new Crown Prince, and was subsequently made Generalissimus of the Swedish Armed Forces by the King, Charles XIII. Bernadotte was crowned Charles XIV of Sweden on 5 February 1818.

== Later life ==
Shortly after the succession to the throne, Mörner married Sofia Emerentia af Wetterstedt. In 1811, Mörner became a captain, and the same year he became adjutant to the newly adopted Crown Prince. After that, Mörner advanced in the army until he was promoted to colonel in 1818. He resigned the following year.

He was deputy governor of Jämtland from 1824, until he was appointed customs inspector at Blockhusudden in 1829, remaining in that office until he retired in 1841.

He is buried in Linköping's old cemetery.

== In film ==
Baron Mörner is a character in Désirée, a 1954 historical film biography. The film tells a fictionalized story of Désirée Clary, spouse of Charles XIV of Sweden, and her relationship with Napoleon.
