= Charles XIV John =

King of Sweden and Norway from 1818 to 1844

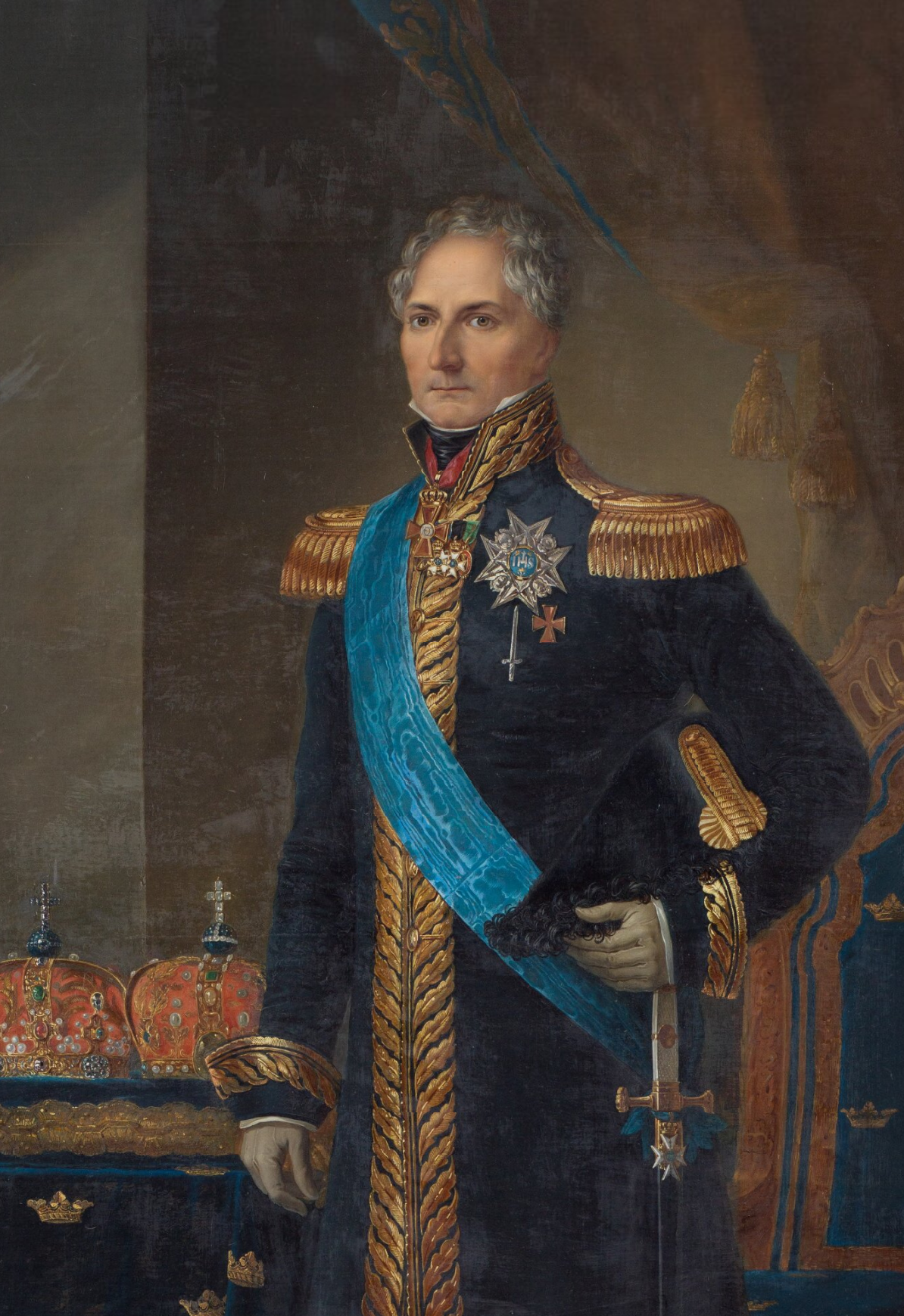
- Portrait by Fredric Westin, c. 1843

King of Sweden and Norway
- Reign: 5 February 1818 – 8 March 1844
- Coronations: 11 May 1818 Stockholm Cathedral, Sweden; 7 September 1818 Nidaros Cathedral, Norway
- Predecessor: Charles XIII & II
- Successor: Oscar I

Prince of Pontecorvo
- Reign: 5 June 1806 – 21 August 1810
- Successor: Lucien Murat

Minister of War of the French Republic
- In office 2 July 1799 – 14 September 1799
- Preceded by: Louis Marie de Milet de Mureau
- Succeeded by: Edmond Louis Alexis Dubois-Crancé
- Born: Jean Bernadotte; 26 January 1763; Pau, Pyrénées-Atlantiques, France
- Died: 8 March 1844 (aged 81); Stockholm, Sweden
- Burial: 26 April 1844; Riddarholm Church
- Spouse: Désirée Clary (m. 1798)
- Issue: Oscar I of Sweden
Names
- Swedish: Karl Johan Baptist Julius; French: Jean-Baptiste Jules
- House: Bernadotte
- Father: Henri Bernadotte; Charles XIII (adoptive)
- Mother: Jeanne de Saint-Jean
- Military career
- Allegiance: France; Sweden–Norway
- Service years: 1780–1844
- Rank: Marshal (France); Generalissimo (Sweden)
- Commands: Governor of Hanover; Governor of Ansbach; Governor of the Hanseatic Cities; Army of the Rhine (1798); Army of the West; I Corps; IX Corps; Army of Antwerp; Allied Army of the North; Supreme Commander of the Swedish Armed Forces and Norwegian Armed Forces
- Conflicts: See list: French Revolutionary Wars; War of the First Coalition; Battle of Fleurus (1794); Battle of Theiningen; Passage of the Tagliamento (1797); Capture of Gradisca (1797); Napoleonic Wars; War of the Third Coalition; Battle of Austerlitz; War of the Fourth Coalition; Battle of Halle; Battle of Lübeck; Battle of Mohrungen; Battle of Guttstadt-Deppen; War of the Fifth Coalition; Battle of Linz-Urfahr; Battle of Wagram; Walcheren Campaign; War of the Sixth Coalition; Battle of Großbeeren; Battle of Dennewitz; Battle of Leipzig; Dano-Swedish War (1813–1814); Swedish–Norwegian War (1814)
- Awards: See list: Grand Master Order of the Seraphim; Grand Master Order of the Sword; Grand Master Order of the Polar Star; Grand Master of the Order of Vasa; Grand Collar Legion of Honour; Grand Cross of the Iron Cross; Order of St. George 1st Class; Order of the Iron Crown; Order of the Elephant; Military Order of Maria Theresa; Names inscribed on the Arc de Triomphe
- Other work: Councillor of State; Ambassador to the Court of Vienna and the Holy Roman Emperor, King of Hungary

Charles XIV John (Swedish: Karl XIV Johan; 26 January 1763 – 8 March 1844) was King of Sweden and Norway from 1818 until his death in 1844 and the first monarch of the Bernadotte dynasty. In Norway, he is known as Charles III John (Norwegian: Karl III Johan); before he became royalty in Sweden, his name was Jean-Baptiste Jules Bernadotte. During the Napoleonic Wars, he participated in battles as a Marshal of France.

Born in Pau in the region of southern France known as Béarn, Bernadotte joined the French Royal Army in 1780. Following the outbreak of the French Revolution, he demonstrated great military talent, rising rapidly through the ranks and becoming a brigadier general by 1794. He served with distinction in Italy and Germany, and was briefly Minister of War. His relationship with Napoleon was turbulent; nevertheless, Napoleon named him a Marshal of the Empire on the proclamation of the French Empire. Bernadotte played a significant role in the French victory at Austerlitz, and was made Prince of Pontecorvo as a reward. His marriage to Désirée Clary, whose sister was married to Joseph Bonaparte, made Bernadotte a member of the extended Imperial family.

In 1810, Bernadotte was unexpectedly elected the Crown Prince to the childless King Charles XIII of Sweden, thanks to the advocacy of Baron Carl Otto Mörner, a Swedish courtier and obscure member of the Riksdag of the Estates. He assumed the name Charles (Carl) after his adoptive father and John (Johan), which is a Swedish version of Jean. He was subsequently named regent and generalissimo of the Swedish Armed Forces, soon after his arrival becoming de facto head of state for most of his time as Crown Prince. In 1812, following the sudden unprovoked French invasion of Swedish Pomerania, Crown Prince Charles John was instrumental in the creation of the Sixth Coalition by allying with Alexander I of Russia and using Swedish diplomacy to bring warring Russia and Britain together in alliance. He then played a major role in the writing of the Trachenberg Plan, the war-winning Allied campaign plan, and commanded the Allied Army of the North that defeated two concerted French attempts to capture Berlin and made the decisive attack on the last day of the catastrophic French defeat at Leipzig.

Following the conclusion of the Leipzig campaign and after liberating Bremen and Lübeck from the French in late November 1813, Charles John invaded Denmark, aiming to knock Napoleon's last major ally out of the war to secure the Coalition's northern flank in preparation for the invasion of France in 1814 and to secure Norway for Sweden, as stipulated in the several treaties that created the Sixth Coalition. After a brief campaign that saw the defeat of the Danish Army, King Frederick VI of Denmark was forced to sign the Treaty of Kiel on 15 January 1814 that ceded Norway to Sweden, that in turn led to the Swedish–Norwegian War of 1814, where Norway was defeated in nineteen days. This put Norway into a union with Sweden, which lasted for almost a century before its peaceful 1905 dissolution. The Swedish–Norwegian war is viewed as Sweden's last direct conflict and war.

Upon the death of Charles XIII in 1818, Charles John ascended to the throne. He presided over a period of peace and prosperity, and reigned until his death in 1844.

== Early life and family ==
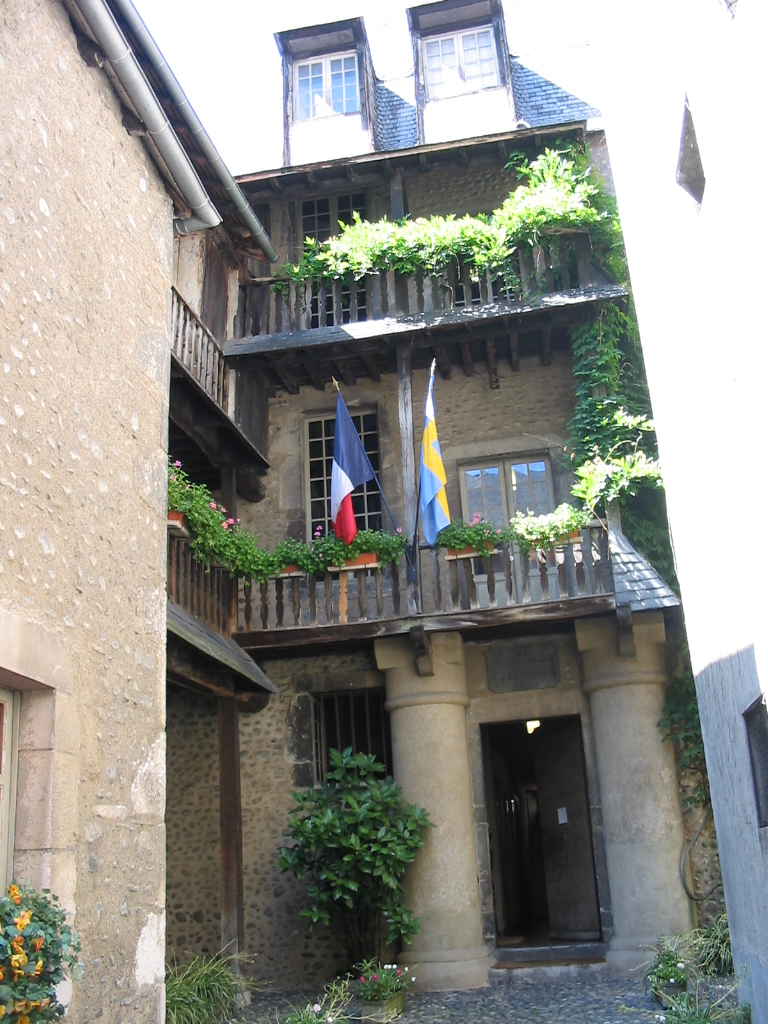
Bernadotte's birthplace in Pau, France

Jean Bernadotte was born on 26 January 1763 in Pau, the capital of the province of Béarn in the southwestern part of the Kingdom of France. He was the son of Jean Henri Bernadotte (1711–1780), prosecutor at Pau, and his wife (married at Boeil, 20 February 1754) Jeanne de Saint-Jean (1728–1809), niece of the lay abbot of Sireix. The family name was originally du Poey (or de Pouey), but was changed to Bernadotte – a surname of an ancestress at the beginning of the 17th century. He was the youngest of five siblings, two of whom died in childhood. Soon after his birth, Baptiste was added to his name to distinguish him from his elder brother Jean Évangeliste. Bernadotte himself added Jules to his first names as a tribute to the French Empire under Napoleon I.

At the age of 14, he was apprenticed to a local attorney. Aged 17, his father's death dissuaded him from following in his career.

== Early military career ==
Bernadotte joined the army as a private in the Régiment Royal–La Marine on 3 September 1780, and first served in the newly conquered territory of Corsica. Subsequently, the Régiment stationed in Besançon, Grenoble, Vienne, Marseille and Île de Ré. He reached the rank of sergeant in August 1785 and was nicknamed Sergeant Belle-Jambe, for his smart appearance. In early 1790, he was promoted to adjutant-major, the highest rank for non-commissioned officers in the Ancien Régime.

== Revolutionary Wars ==
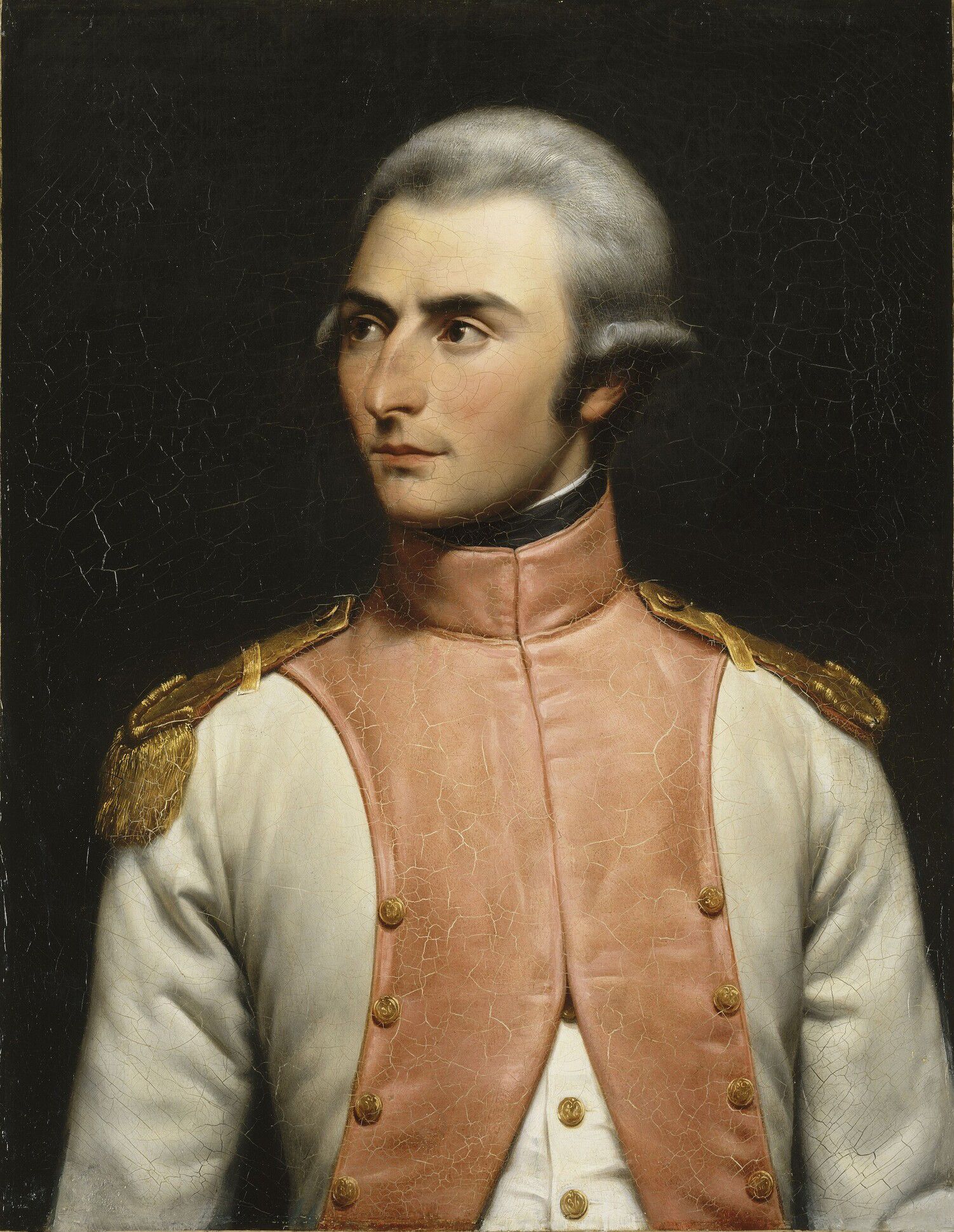
Bernadotte during the French Revolution

Following the outbreak of the French Revolution, his eminent military qualities brought him speedy promotion. Bernadotte's promotions came both from the esteem of his commanders as well as from his men; having been elected to the rank of lieutenant colonel and colonel by his men, though he refused both nominations in favor of traditional advancement.

It was during this period of rapid advancement that the military qualities he became known for, daring assaults and gasconades, came to the fore. Of the latter, Bernadotte was gifted in his ability to inspire his men to prodigious feats of valor. He has been compared by historians to a fellow Gascon, d'Artagnan. One of his biographers asserts that Alexandre Dumas used Bernadotte as the model for his d'Artagnan. As Colonel and commander of the 71st Demi-Brigade, Bernadotte rallied his men, who were retreating in disorder before an Austrian attack, by tearing off his epaulettes, throwing them to the ground before his men, and shouting, “If you dishonor yourselves by flight, I refuse to remain your colonel!” Soldiers left the ranks, gathered his epaulettes, pressed them into his hands, formed ranks and reformed the line, and counter-attacked.

By 1794, he was promoted to brigadier, attached to the Army of Sambre-et-Meuse. After Jourdan's victory at Fleurus (26 June 1794), where he distinguished himself with a decisive attack and seizure of key terrain that led to the Austrian retreat, he became a divisional general.

Bernadotte played key roles throughout the next 18 months during the three French invasions into Germany; often employed in the place of honor during offensives, leading the vanguard, and in retreat as a defensive specialist commanding the rearguard.

At the Battle of Theiningen (1796), where the Austrians outnumbered the French three to one, Bernadotte's rear-guard successfully repulsed numerous attacks while inflicting heavy losses on the enemy, preventing the Archduke Charles from cutting off the retreat of the French army over the Rhine after its defeat by the Austrians at the Battle of Würzburg.

At the beginning of 1797, he was ordered by the Directory to march with 20,000 men as reinforcements to Napoleon Bonaparte's army in Italy. His successful crossing of the Alps through the storm in midwinter was highly praised but coldly received by the Army of Italy. Upon receiving insult from Dominique Martin Dupuy, the commander of Milan, Bernadotte was to arrest him for insubordination. Dupuy was a close friend of Louis-Alexandre Berthier, and this started a long-lasting feud between Bernadotte and Berthier, who would become Napoleon's chief of staff.

He had his first interview with Napoleon in Mantua and was appointed the commander of the 4th division. During the invasion of Friuli and Istria, Bernadotte distinguished himself greatly at the passage of the Tagliamento where he led the vanguard, and at the capture of the fortress of Gradisca (19 March 1797). After the 18th Fructidor, Napoleon ordered his generals to collect from their respective divisions' addresses in favor of the coup d'état of that day; but Bernadotte sent an address to the Directory different from that which Napoleon wished for and without conveying it through Napoleon's hands.

After the Treaty of Campo Formio, Napoleon gave Bernadotte a friendly visit at his headquarters at Udine, but immediately after deprived him of half his division of the army of the Rhine, and commanded him to march the other half back to France. Paul Barras, one of five directors, was cautious that Napoleon would overturn the Republic, so he appointed Bernadotte commander-in-chief of the Army of Italy in order to offset Napoleon's power. Bernadotte was pleased with this appointment but Napoleon lobbied Talleyrand-Périgord, the Minister of Foreign Affairs, to appoint him to the embassy of Vienna instead. Bernadotte was very dissatisfied; he finally accepted the post in Vienna, but had to quit owing to the disturbances caused by his hoisting the tricolour over the embassy.

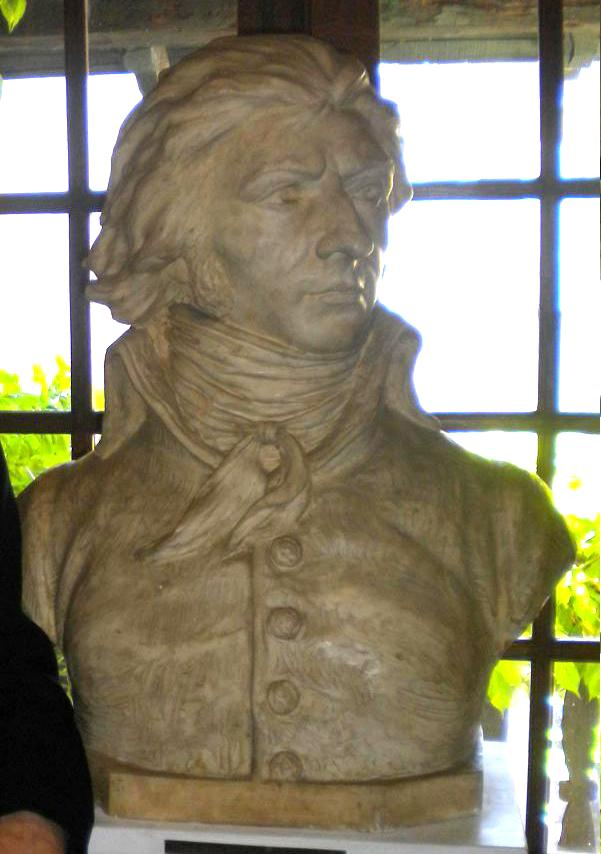
Bust of a young Bernadotte at the Bernadotte Museum in Pau, France

After returning from Vienna, he resided in Paris. He married Désirée Clary in August 1798, the daughter of a Marseilles merchant, and once engaged to Napoleon, and Joseph Bonaparte's sister-in-law. In November of the same year, he was made commander of the army of observation on the upper Rhine. Although solicited to do so by Barras and Joseph Bonaparte, he did not take part in the coup d'état of the 30th Prairial. From 2 July to 14 September, he was Minister of War, in which capacity he displayed great ability. His popularity and contacts with radical Jacobins aroused antipathy of him in the government. On the morning of 13 September, he found his resignation announced in Le Moniteur Universel before he was aware that he had tendered it. This was a trick; played upon him by Sieyès and Roger Ducos, the directors allied to Napoleon.

Though Bernadotte declined to help Napoleon Bonaparte stage his coup d'état of November 1799, Napoleon was resolved to win over the "Obstacle Man" and showered him with honors. Napoleon acknowledged Bernadotte's administrative ability and influence by naming him a Councillor of State in February 1800. In April 1800, despite his republican sympathies, Bernadotte was offered, and freely accepted, from April 1800 to 18 August 1801, the post of Commander-in-Chief of the Army of the West in the rebellious Vendée, where he successfully restored its tranquility. This was seen as an appointment of trust, as while Napoleon embarked on his summer Italian Campaign, where he ultimately prevailed at the Battle of Marengo, he left Bernadotte not far from Paris with an army. In his farewell note to Bernadotte on his way to Italy, Napoleon wrote: "I am going to fling myself once more into the hazards of war. We do not know how it may turn out. If I fall, you will find yourself with 40,000 men at the gates of Paris. In your hands will be the fate of the Republic." As Bernadotte was brother-in-law to Joseph and close friends with his other brothers and sisters, Napoleon is thought to have been considering the welfare of his family in the possible event of his death on the battlefield, as well as the future of the country, by leaving his erstwhile rival in a position to seize the reins of government as, of his former rivals, only Bernadotte had the political and military skill and popularity to maintain the Republic.

In 1802, Napoleon Bonaparte proposed that Bernadotte head to New France to serve as governor of Louisiana, which was to be transferred back to French control following the Third Treaty of San Ildefonso. In accepting the position, Bernadotte requested additional soldiers, settlers, and funding to support the colony, but Napoleon refused. In response, Bernadotte declined the posting and instead was named plenipotentiary ambassador to the United States. His posting was cancelled after the Sale of Louisiana.

== Marshal of the French Empire ==
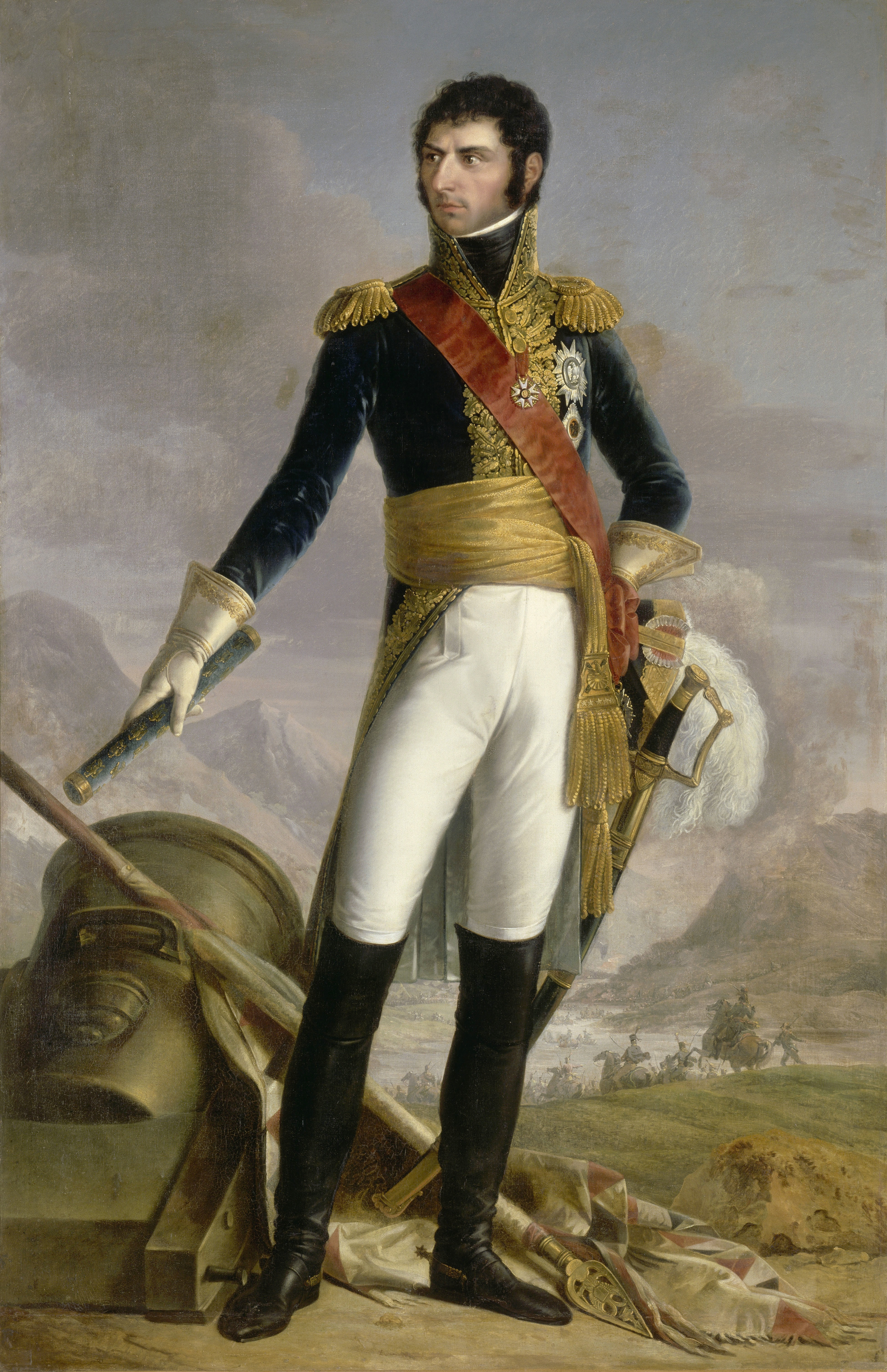
Bernadotte as a Marshal of the Empire; copy of an 1804 portrait by François Kinson

On the introduction of the First French Empire, Bernadotte became one of the eighteen Marshals of the Empire, and from June 1804 to September 1805 served as governor of the recently occupied Hanover. In this capacity, as well as during his later command of the army of northern Germany, he built a reputation for independence, incorruptibility, moderation, and administrative ability. Bernadotte's rule was popular, and despite the exactions taken from the populace as part of Napoleon's policy of making occupations pay for themselves, Hanover's economy prospered. Bernadotte extended his protection and made private contributions to Gottingen University, befriending many of the professors and other men of learning whom he often had over for dinner and employed to tutor himself and his wife.

During the campaign of 1805, Bernadotte, with his army corps from Hanover, formed into the I Corps, commanded the Left Wing of the Grande Armée overseeing Auguste de Marmont's II Corps and having the majority of the Bavarian Army attached to his command; some 65,000 men or 1/4th of the Army. Bernadotte was also tasked with assuring France's newest ally, the Elector of Bavaria, Maximillian IV Joseph, that the Austrians would be driven from his country.

Bernadotte, with Davout's III Corps attached to his command, and the Bavarians, gained a victory over the Austrians, driving them out of Munich on 12 October, taking some 3000 prisoners and 19 guns and installing Maximillian Joseph back onto his throne. I Corps then co-operated in the great movement which resulted in the shutting off of Mack in the Battle of Ulm. Bernadotte's troops then captured Salzburg on 30 October. In the Battle of Austerlitz (2 December 1805) he was posted with his corps in the center between Soult and Lannes, and contributed to defeating the attempt of the right wing of the allies to outflank the French army. As a reward for his services at Austerlitz, he became the 1st Sovereign Prince of Pontecorvo (5 June 1806), a district in southern Italy formerly subject to the Pope.

During the 1806 campaign against Prussia, Bernadotte was reproached by Napoleon for not participating with his army corps in the battles of Jena and Auerstädt (14 October 1806). Napoleon, on the night of 13 October, thinking he had faced the whole Prussian Army at Jena, sent orders to Davout, through Marshal Berthier, Davout relayed the order to Bernadotte at 0400 on 14 October with the order stating: "If the Prince of Ponte Corvo [Bernadotte] is with you, you may both march together, but the Emperor hopes that he will be in the position which had been indicated at Dornburg." This was in accordance with Bernadotte's last set of written orders from 12 October, which ordered him and Davout to get across the Prussian line of retreat. In pursuance of these orders, Bernadotte, separately from Davout, left Naumburg at dawn on the morning of the 14th for Dornburg and marched toward Apolda, which he reached by 16:00. Hampered by the very poor state of the roads, and a steep defile within which Dornburg is situated and the narrow bridge which passes over the Saale, that could pass but one artillery piece at a time according to General Dupont, he could not engage in the Battle of Jena, though he effectively compelled the Prussians to retreat from both battlefields by posting his troops on the heights of Apolda.

The defile was such an obstacle that Bernadotte's 3rd Infantry division, commanded by Jean-Baptiste Drouet, Comte d'Erlon, was still in the midst of crossing the bridge well after nightfall, making it unlikely that Bernadotte could have intervened at Auerstädt in any event. He later was accused of deliberately refusing to support Davout, who had unexpectedly encountered the Prussian main army at Auerstädt, out of jealousy, and Napoleon, if reminiscences from St. Helena may be believed, once intended to put Bernadotte before a court-martial. In fact, he did what he had been ordered to do, and more fundamental responsibility for his absence rests upon the ambiguous and indirect orders issued by Berthier and Napoleon's unawareness of the Prussian position. Documentary evidence supports Bernadotte's assertion that he was ordered to Dornberg, as no orders from Napoleon to Bernadotte to march with Davout were ever found in French Imperial Archives, while Berthier's order of 14 October was confirmed.

After the Battle of Jena, Bernadotte crushed the Prussian Reserve Army, all fresh troops fortified behind a marsh and the River Saale, under Duke Eugen of Württemberg at Halle (17 October 1806), though Imperial Headquarters did not much appreciate this victory. When visiting Halle after the battle, and commenting on the degree of difficulty of storming a fortified position accessible only by a single bridge, Napoleon enigmatically commented, "Bernadotte stops at nothing. Someday the Gascon will get caught." Subsequently, Bernadotte pursued, conjointly with Soult and Murat (known as the "Pursuit of the Three Marshals"), Prussian general Blücher's Corps to Lübeck, where his troops stormed the Prussian defenses, taking the city and forcing Blücher's capitulation at Ratekau (7 November 1806). When the French forced their way into Lübeck, the city became the target of large-scale looting and rampage by the French soldiers. Bernadotte, struggling desperately to prevent his men from sacking the city, was given six horses from the Council of Lübeck as a token of their appreciation. He also treated with courtesy 1600 Swedish prisoners, under the command of Colonel Count Gustaf Mörner, and allowed them to return to their home country. The impressed Swedes went home with a tale of Bernadotte's fairness in maintaining order within the city. Count Mörner would later play a prominent role in the election of Bernadotte as Crown Prince of Sweden.

Thereafter, he marched to Poland in command of the French Left Wing, composed of his I Corps and Ney's VI Corps. Left unsupported by Ney's unexpected movement toward Königsberg, the Russians under Levin August von Bennigsen passed over to the offensive and attempted to destroy Bernadotte's and Ney's isolated Corps. Napoleon, having received word of the Russian offensive, gave word to Bernadotte to retreat West to draw the Russians toward him so that Napoleon could then cut off and surround the Russians. Bernadotte moved West as ordered, pursued by Bennigsen, where he defeated the numerically superior Russian vanguard at Mohrungen (25 January 1807).

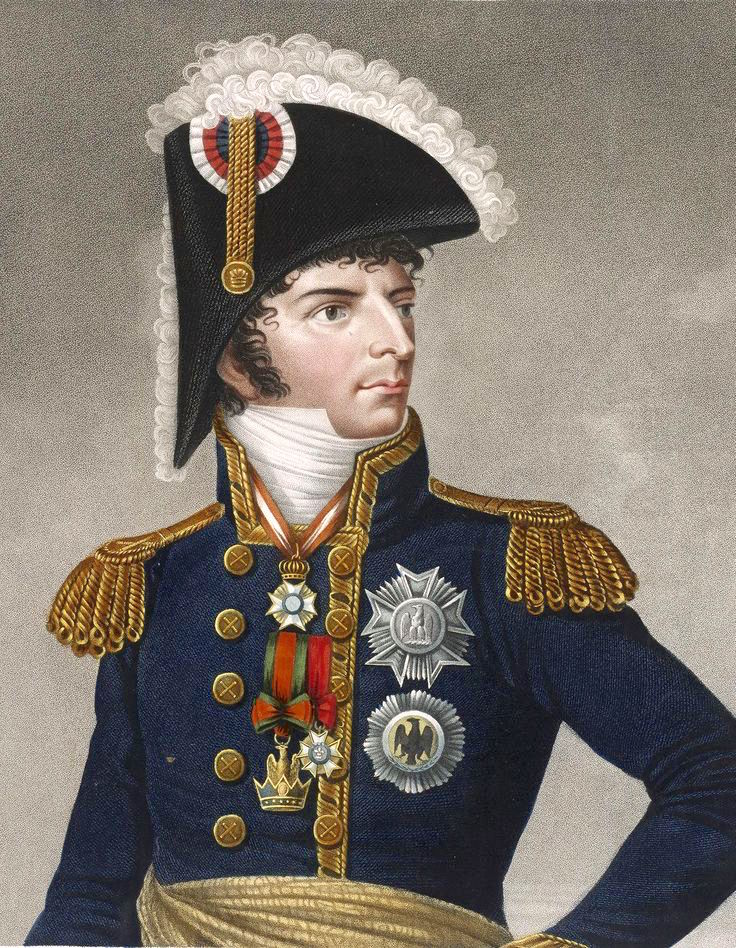
Bernadotte as a French Marshal

During the battle, Bernadotte's personal wagon was captured by the Russians, and he was accused, by the Cossacks who looted his baggage, of having extorted a large quantity of silver plate from minor German states. This claim is unsubstantiated and contrary to his reputation. He was known throughout the army for his probity and honesty in the conduct of his affairs on campaign, and he refrained from the looting and brigandage that many of his fellow marshals engaged in. As a consequence, his table fare was considered poor by his brother marshals, and while others dined on fine service and employed chefs, he habitually used his own money to pay for food for his troops, and to give money awards to those who merited recognition. He held his troops to the same high standard; he punished looting and rape severely, and was known to intervene with his sword drawn against those engaged in pillaging, as was the case following the capture of Lübeck.

Due to the capture of a courier carrying the Emperor's latest orders, Bernadotte was not informed of a change of strategy to move East toward the rest of the French Army. As a consequence, Bernadotte's I Corps was too far away to take part in the Battle of Eylau (7 to 8 February 1807). Napoleon rebuked him for his absence, but it became acknowledged that it was not due to Bernadotte but Berthier's carelessness in dispatching the orderly. The Russians resumed the offensive that summer and Bernadotte was attacked by, and defeated, a strong Prussian Corps at Spanden, preserving the French bridgehead over the Pasłęka, where he was nearly killed when a spent ball struck him in the neck. Due to this near-fatal wound, Bernadotte was invalided to the rear and missed the remainder of the Polish Campaign.

After the Peace of Tilsit, on 14 July 1807, he became governor of the Hanseatic towns, where he once again proved his administrative and diplomatic abilities and was well-liked. He was to direct the expedition against Sweden, via the Danish islands, but the plan came to naught because of the want of transports and the defection of the Spanish contingent, which went back to Spain to fight against Napoleon at the start of the Peninsular War. Pursuant to the projected invasion of Sweden, and by virtue of Denmark becoming an ally of France in 1808, Bernadotte found himself de facto head of a French occupation of Denmark. He maintained strict discipline of his troops, and his good treatment of the Danes made him popular with the populace and the Danish Royal Family. Upon his departure from Denmark, he was one of the few Frenchmen of the period to be awarded the Order of the Elephant.

During Bernadotte's time as governor of the Hanseatic cities, the Abdications of Bayonne occurred, an event that triggered the Peninsular War, which would play a large role in Napoleon's defeat. For a time, Napoleon considered the notion of placing Bernadotte on the Spanish throne, going so far as to hint at it in a letter to him. Bernadotte informed Napoleon that he did not want the Spanish Crown. Joseph Bonaparte, Bernadotte's friend and brother-in-law, was chosen instead. It was not the first or last time Napoleon considered placing Bernadotte on a foreign throne. Indeed, Napoleon, on several occasions, both during his days as First Consul and as Emperor, considered naming Bernadotte (Napoleon also considered Murat) as his successor by adoption. Despite their rivalry, Napoleon thought Bernadotte alone had the popularity, administrative, and military skill to safeguard the Empire he had built. The birth of the King of Rome put an end to Napoleon's need for an heir. Ironically, Bernadotte eventually wore a crown, not through the auspices of Napoleon, but as an enemy of France.

Recalled to Germany to assist in the new war between France and Austria, he received the command of the 9th Corps, which was mainly composed of Saxons. Further difficulties with Berthier, and a saddling with ill-prepared Saxons, combined with an illness, compelled Bernadotte to beg for release from service. Bernadotte wrote to Napoleon that "I see my efforts perpetually paralyzed by a hidden force over which I can not prevail." Napoleon disregarded these appeals, and Bernadotte proceeded with the campaign, commanding mostly foreign troops with few French troops under his command. At the Battle of Wagram (5 July 1809), he entered battle with his Saxon corps, to which the division of Dupas was attached and which formed his reserve. Resting on the French Left, Bernadotte's corps was battered during the night but resisted the full fury of the Austrian attack, facing superior numbers. At a critical moment, the officer ordered Dupas forward to his support; the latter replied that he had orders from the emperor to remain where he was. Having been badly mauled and fully exposed ahead of the main French line, IX Corps withdrew from the village of Aderklaa against Napoleon's orders. On the second day of battle, 6 July 1809, IX Corps, having been mauled the night before, wherein Bernadotte struggled to rally his demoralized Saxons, was attacked by two Austrian corps, as part of Archduke Charles's effort to break the French line. This time Bernadotte's depleted forces – he had only 6,000 infantry left – broke and fled (Bernadotte's Corps was not the only one to break that day; Masséna's troops were also routed by the attack). The routed Saxons retreated in disorder toward Raasdorf as Bernadotte attempted to rally his men, where he encountered Napoleon. IX Corps rallied and continued to play a role in the battle. Rumors that Napoleon relieved Bernadotte of command on the spot at Raasdorf have long been the stuff of legend, but are not verified. After the battle, Bernadotte complained to Napoleon for having, in violation of all military rules, ordered Dupas to act independently of his command, and for having thereby caused great loss of life to the Saxons, and tendered his resignation. Napoleon accepted after he became aware of an order of the day issued by Bernadotte, which gave the Saxons credit for their courage in terms inconsistent with the emperor's official bulletin. Accounts of Bernadotte's role at Wagram are contradictory. While it is true that IX Corps broke on 6 July, as did other French formations, they later rallied and played a part in the victory. Moreover, Bernadotte fought with exceptional personal courage, at the head of his troops, and narrowly avoided death when attacked by Austrian cavalry. It is likely that IX Corps' poor performance would have been forgotten, and Bernadotte would have retained his command had he never published the controversial Order of the Day. His praise for the Saxons, as well as his mild and courteous treatment of them while under his command, was never forgotten by the Saxon officers and this would later have disastrous consequences for the French when a whole Saxon division defected to Bernadotte's Army of the North during a key moment of the Battle of Leipzig.

With Bernadotte having returned to Paris, the Walcheren Campaign (July 1809) caused the French ministry, in the absence of the emperor, to entrust him with the defense of Antwerp with both regular French and Dutch troops, along with the National Guard. Bernadotte took command of a chaotic situation in which troops from all over the Empire and its vassal states, as well as raw conscripts, were sent to Holland under divided command. He reorganized and trained his forces, named by the Emperor the Army of Antwerp, by instilling discipline in old soldiers who had been too long at the depots and by teaching raw conscripts their trade. Everywhere he instilled a fighting spirit, making an army out of a mob, and thus he rapidly brought the defenses of Antwerp to a high order of readiness. With Antwerp bristling with cannon and numerous defenders, and with the Army of Antwerp whipped into fighting shape, the British, vexed by poor leadership and with half the army immobilized with fever thanks to the insalubrious islands upon which they were quartered, realized that it was no longer possible to close the Scheldt, or take Antwerp, and they withdrew their forces. In a proclamation issued to his troops at Antwerp, he made an implied charge against Napoleon of having neglected to prepare the proper means of defense for the Belgian coast. A displeased Napoleon relieved Bernadotte of command of his ad hoc army and ordered his return to Paris, then to Catalonia to take command of the Army there. Refusing to comply with the order, he was summoned to Vienna, and after an interview with Napoleon at Schönbrunn, accepted the general government of the Roman departments.

== Offer of the Swedish throne ==
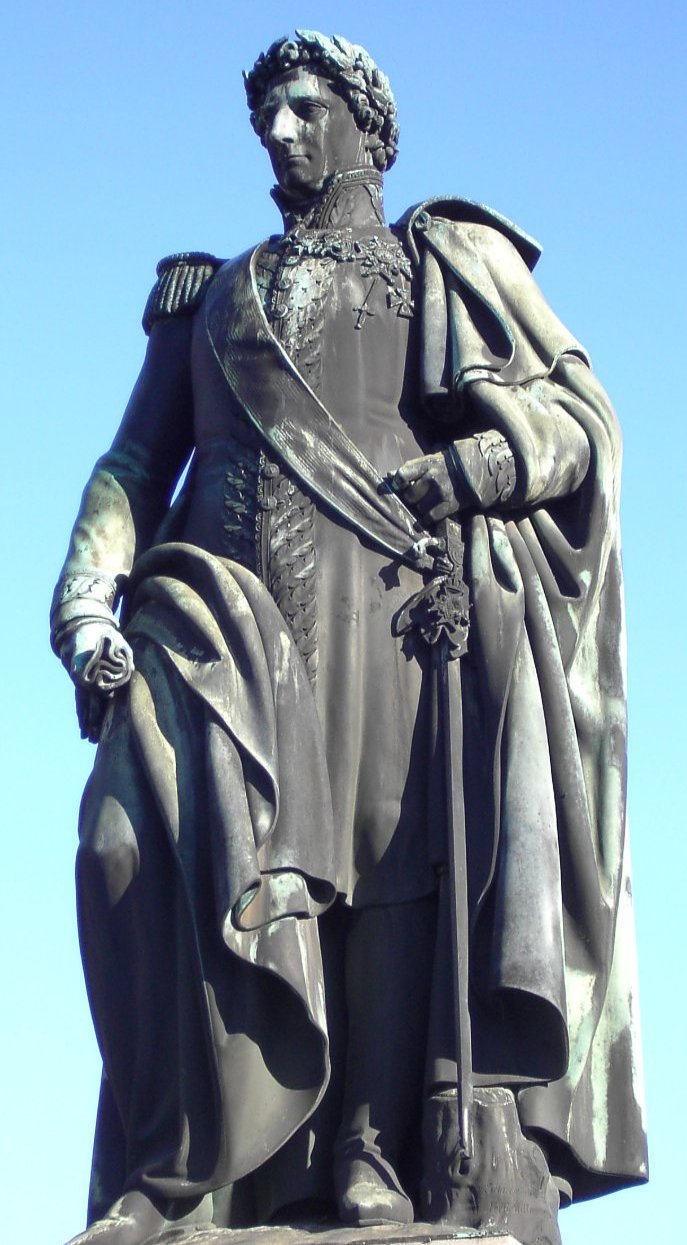
Statue in Norrköping erected in 1846

In 1810, Bernadotte was about to enter his new post as governor of Rome when he was unexpectedly elected Crown Prince to King Charles XIII of Sweden. The problem of Charles's successor had been acute almost from the time he had ascended the throne a year earlier. He was 61 years old and in poor health. He was also childless; Queen Charlotte had given birth to two children who had died in infancy, and there was no prospect of her bearing another child. Soon after his coronation, the king had adopted a Danish prince, Charles August, who had died just a few months after his arrival. Despite the fact that Napoleon favored his ally, King Frederick VI of Denmark, the Danish Prince Frederick Christian of Sonderburg-Augustenburg initially had the most support to become the Swedish Crown Prince.

The political situation, both internal and external, in Sweden made selecting a foreign king an attractive option. Sweden wanted to strengthen its relationship with Napoleon for military reasons and sought to select a king who could attract Napoleon's support. The Swedish court initially sounded out the emperor for his preferences on candidates for crown prince, whereupon Napoleon made it clear he preferred his adopted stepson Eugène de Beauharnais, or one of his nephews or brothers. The Swedish envoys did not accept Eugène as a candidate. Baron Lagerbielke, the Swedish envoy in Paris, reported to Stockholm that Eugène was "gentle and good [...] but he does not seem to be a man of strong character; and, although he had had great opportunities, he does not appear to have developed any distinguishing talents." Also, Eugène, serving as viceroy in Italy, did not wish to convert to Lutheranism, a prerequisite for accepting the Swedish offer. Moreover, none of Napoleon's brothers were interested in going to Sweden, and his nephews were too young, as the Swedes did not want the hazards of minority rule in the event that King Charles died prematurely. The matter was decided by an obscure Swedish courtier, Baron Karl Otto Mörner (nephew of Count Gustav Mörner, the commander of the Swedish force captured by Bernadotte at Lübeck), who, entirely on his own initiative, offered the succession to the Swedish crown to Bernadotte. Bernadotte communicated Mörner's offer to Napoleon, who at first treated the situation as an absurdity, but later came around to the idea and, while adopting a public attitude of indifference, quietly lent support to Bernadotte's candidacy both financially and diplomatically.

Although the Swedish government, amazed at Mörner's effrontery, at once placed him under arrest on his return to Sweden, the candidature of Bernadotte gradually gained favour and on 21 August 1810 he was elected by the Riksdag of the Estates in Örebro to be the new crown prince, and was subsequently made Generalissimus of the Swedish Armed Forces by the King. Several factors benefitted Bernadotte's election. Being foreign was, although problematic, also to his favour due to geopolitical factors and the internal situation at the time. One benefit was his presumed close ties to French Emperor Napoleon Bonaparte, with whom he would have access to military backing, as the intention at the time was to reacquire Finland. The current King, Charles XIII, viewed Napoleon in a more positive way than Gustav IV Adolf had, who had held him in very ill regard. Another point in favour was that a large part of the Swedish Army, anticipating conflict with Russia, favoured electing a soldier. Also, Bernadotte was personally popular, owing to the kindness he had shown to the Swedish prisoners in Lübeck and his reputation as the well-liked governor of the Hanseatic Cities from 1807 to 1809, as many Swedish merchants had operated under his auspices. Finally, Bernadotte had no qualms about his own and his son Oscar's conversion to Lutheranism, recalling the conversion of Henry IV for the benefit of France with whom he felt a kinship as both hailed from Pau. (Bernadotte's wife Désirée refused to convert).

Before freeing Bernadotte from his allegiance to France, Napoleon asked him to agree never to take up arms against France. Bernadotte refused to make any such agreement, upon the ground that his obligations to Sweden would not allow it; Napoleon exclaimed, "Go, and let our destinies be accomplished", and signed the act of emancipation unconditionally. Many were also optimistic that Sweden would recover Finland under Charles John. The Swedish crown prince even unsuccessfully sought Napoleon's support to assist Sweden in conquering Norway.

== Crown Prince and Regent ==
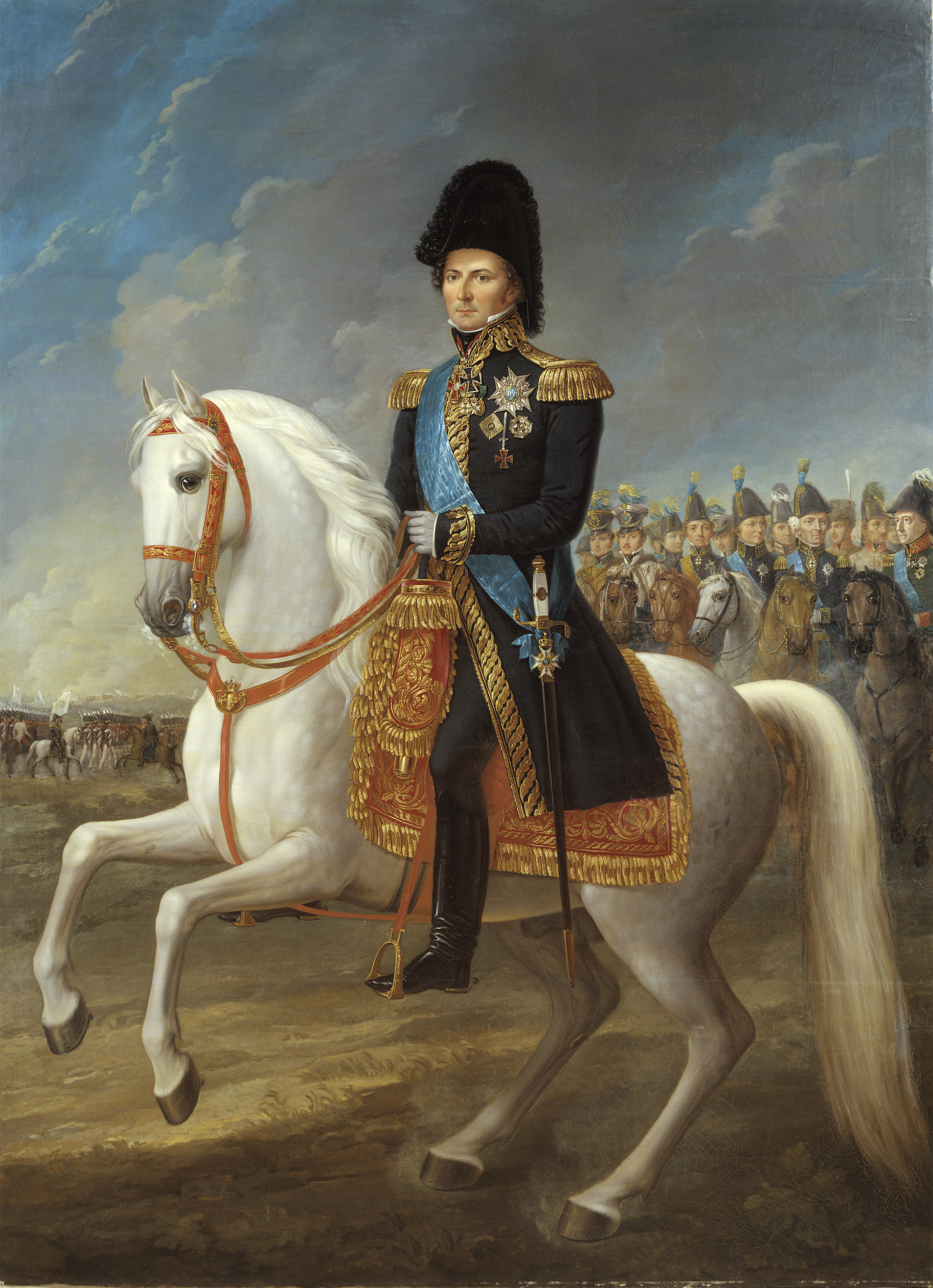
Bernadotte as Crown Prince, painting by Fredric Westin

On 2 November 1810 Bernadotte made his solemn entry into Stockholm, and on 5 November he received the homage of the Riksdag of the Estates, and he was adopted by King Charles XIII under the name of "Charles John" (Karl Johan). At the same time, he converted from Roman Catholicism to the Lutheranism of the Swedish court.

“I have beheld war near at hand, and I know all its evils: for it is not conquest which can console a country for the blood of her children, spilt on a foreign land. I have seen the mighty Emperor of the French, so often crowned with the laurel of victory, surrounded by his invincible armies, sigh after the olive-branches of peace. Yes, Gentlemen, peace is the only glorious aim of a sage and enlightened government: it is not the extent of a state which constitutes its strength and independence; it is its laws, its commerce, its industry, and above all, its national spirit.”

— Charles John, address to the Estates, 5 November 1810.

The new Crown Prince was very soon the most popular and most powerful man in Sweden and quickly impressed his adoptive father. Following his first meeting with his new heir, Charles XIII (who had initially opposed Bernadotte's candidacy) remarked to his aide-de-camp count Charles de Suremain, "My dear Suremain, I have gambled heavily, and I believe that after all I have won." He also made himself well-liked by Queen Charlotte, who regarded him as a "gentleman in every sense of the word", and established a net of contact within the Swedish aristocracy, befriending in particular the Brahe family through his favorite Magnus Brahe and countess Aurora Wilhelmina Brahe, whose cousin Mariana Koskull became his lover.

The infirmity of the old King and the dissensions in the Privy Council of Sweden placed the government, and especially the control of foreign policy, entirely in his hands. Amongst the first of Charles John's acts as Crown Prince was to address the dire state of the Swedish economy. The Swedish economy was in shambles after years of mismanagement under the reign of Gustav III and was further aggravated during the reign of his son, Gustav IV Adolf. The economic turmoil had been caused, in part, by the debts accrued from Gustav III's Russian War, in part to the failure of several of Gustav IV Adolf's well intentioned economic reforms (Gustav IV Adolf was rather more successful in his agrarian reforms) and the costs of the more recent wars against France and Russia. Under Gustav IV Adolf, genuine attempts at economic reform, including paying down the national debt by some 700,000 Riksdalers in the first years of his active reign, and revitalizing the currency, met with limited success.

Such measures were undermined by his other policies. Gustav IV Adolf's personal dislike of the Riksdag, which had the power to raise taxes, led to his refusal to call them into session after 1800, crippling his attempts to raise state revenues. Gustav IV Adolf's foreign policy plunged Sweden into disastrous (and expensive) wars against France and Russia. The cost of years of war, several poor harvests between 1798 and 1809, the ineptitude of his ministers in carrying out fiscal reforms, and the loss of Finland's tax base had ballooned Sweden's national debt. The impending demands of Napoleon to adhere to the Continental System forecasted even greater difficulties. Charles John immediately began making reforms and used his sizable fortune, honestly accrued during his time as French Marshal, to pay off much of the debt and stabilize the economy through grants and a £300,000 sterling loan to the state at 5 percent interest. Charles John also purchased back from the French private estates that had been confiscated during the occupation of Swedish Pomerania from 1808 to 1810 and returned them to their original Swedish and German owners.

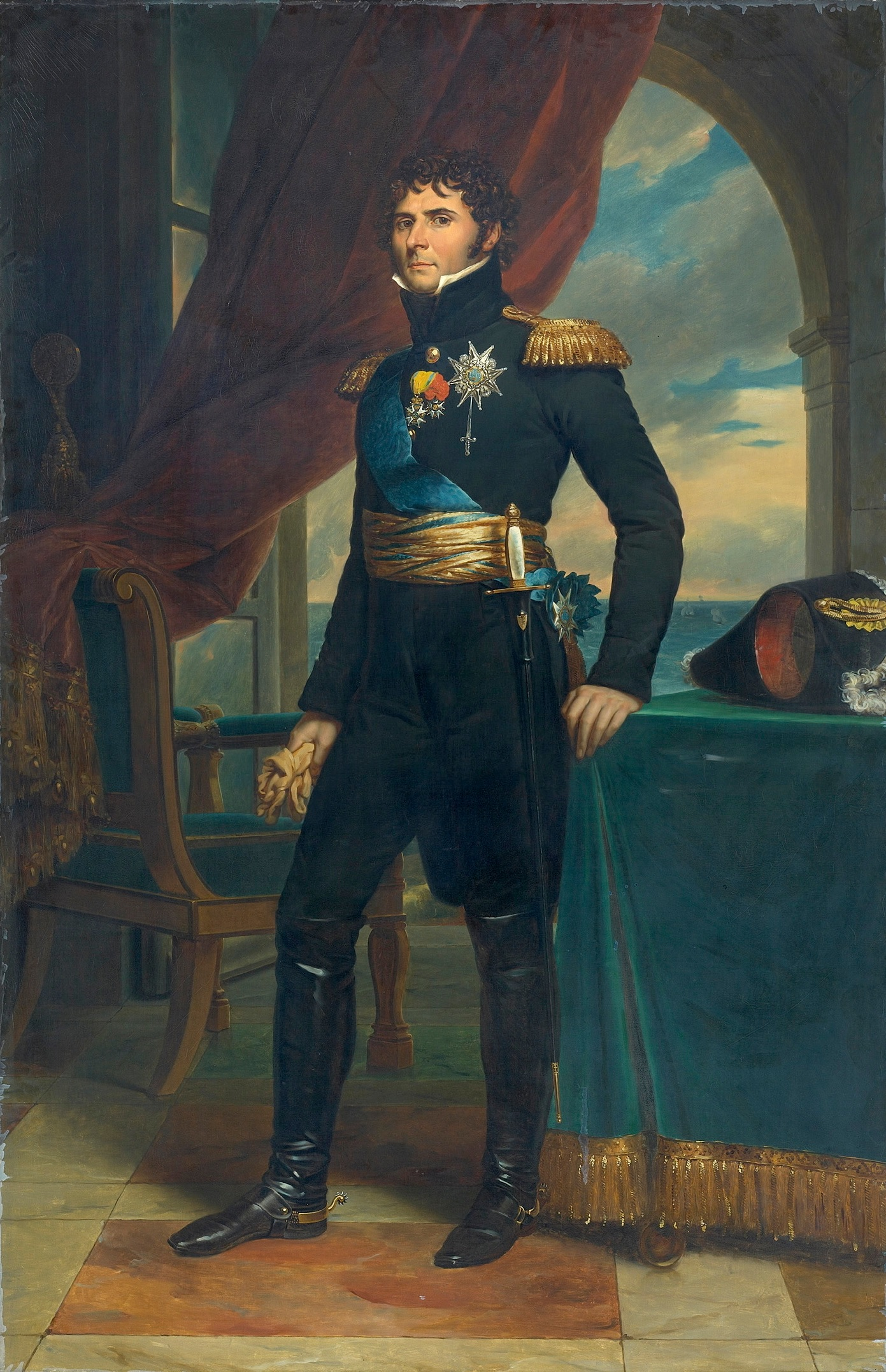
Charles XIV John as Crown Prince of Sweden (1811), by François Gérard.

The keynote of his foreign and domestic policy was the maintenance of Swedish independence of action, often in the face of French demands, and the acquisition of Norway as compensation for the loss of Finland. Many Swedes expected him to reconquer Finland, which had been ceded to Russia. The Crown Prince was aware of the difficulties due to the desperate state of the state's finances and the reluctance of the Finnish people to return to Sweden. Even if Finland was regained, he thought, it would put Sweden into a new cycle of conflicts with a powerful neighbor because there was no guarantee Russia would accept the loss as final. Therefore, he made up his mind to make a united Scandinavian peninsula, which was easier to defend, by taking Norway (intentionally without the ancient and remote provinces of Greenland, Iceland and the Faroe Islands) from Denmark and uniting her to Sweden. He tried to divert public opinion from Finland to Norway, by arguing that to create a compact peninsula, with sea for its natural boundary, was to inaugurate an era of peace, and that waging war with Russia would lead to ruinous consequences.

Soon after Charles John's arrival in Sweden, Napoleon compelled him to accede to the Continental System and to declare war against the United Kingdom; otherwise, Sweden would face the determination of France, Denmark, and Russia. This demand would mean a hard blow to the national economy and the Swedish population. Sweden reluctantly declared war against the UK, which was treated by both countries as merely nominal, although Swedish imports of British goods decreased from £4,871 million in 1810 to £523 million in the following year.

In January 1812, French troops suddenly invaded Swedish Pomerania and the island of Rügen. Officially, the French claimed that Sweden had repeatedly violated the Continental System and that the occupation of Stralsund and Swedish Pomerania was closing an entrepôt for illegal British goods. Napoleon, before marching to Moscow, also had to secure his rear and dared not allow a Swedish continental foothold behind him as he did not trust Charles John. Charles John believed that Napoleon scheduled the occupation to occur on the Crown Prince's birthday and ordered Charles John's old rival, Marshal Davout, to execute the operation as a personal insult, adding another dimension of personal enmity to the incident. As a result, the initially amicable relationship that Charles John had with Napoleon, following his election as Crown Prince, soon changed because of the invasion. The invasion was a clear violation of international law as well as an act of war and public opinion in Sweden was outraged. Moreover, it antagonized the pro-French faction at the Swedish court. Thereafter, the Crown Prince declared the neutrality of Sweden and opened negotiations with the UK and Russia.

In 1812, he allied Sweden with its traditional enemy, Russia, through the Treaty of Saint Petersburg, and sought to make peace with the United Kingdom, with whom Sweden was technically at war. Charles John's personal diplomacy served as the bridge between Russia and the UK, as on 18 July 1812, the Treaty of Örebro formally ended the wars between Britain and Sweden and Britain and Russia, and formed an alliance between Russia, Britain, and Sweden, creating the Sixth Coalition. The treaty stipulated that Sweden would land an army of no less than 25,000 on the continent for the express purpose of fighting France, as well as liberating Swedish Pomerania, and in exchange, Russia and the UK would diplomatically and militarily support the cession of Norway from the doggedly French-allied Denmark to Sweden. Throughout summer and fall 1812, Bernadotte sought to add more allies to the Coalition, and negotiated a treaty with the Spanish Supreme Central Junta against his own brother-in-law, who was currently the French-backed King of Spain. Although Napoleon had forced Frederick William III to break off relations with Sweden, Charles John corresponded with the King of Prussia, encouraging him to renounce the forced alliance with France and join the Coalition. Following the Convention of Tauroggen, which broke the Prussian/French Alliance, Frederick Wilhelm signed the Treaty of Kalisz with Russia, and then a separate peace treaty with Sweden, on the basis of Prussian recognition of the Norwegian cession to Sweden, in exchange for Swedish Pomerania, thus formally joining the Coalition in spring 1813.

After the defeats at Lützen (2 May 1813) and Bautzen (21 May 1813), it was the Swedish Crown Prince who put fresh fighting spirit into the Allies; and at the conference of Trachenberg he drew up the Trachenberg Plan, the general plan for the campaign which began after the expiration of the Truce of Pläswitz.

Charles John, as the Commander-in-Chief of the Northern Army, successfully defended the approaches to Berlin and was victorious in battle against Oudinot in August and against Ney in September at the Battles of Großbeeren and Dennewitz. Bernadotte's Army of the North would continue to guard Berlin and keep watch on Davout's forces in Hamburg while the Allies, in accordance with the plan conceived at Trachenberg, maneuvered toward Napoleon's army at Leipzig. With the other Allied armies engaged in battle on 17 October, Bernadotte's army finally crossed the Elbe and joined in the Battle of Leipzig on 19 October. His fresh troops, reinforced by 30,000 Prussians, joined the fray against the already battered French lines, where Swedish forces entered battle in numbers for the first time in the campaign. At a critical moment, entire Saxon regiments went over to his army in response to a proclamation released a week prior in which Bernadotte invited the Saxons to join their old commander in defeating Napoleon. The Army of the North committed the coup de grâce on the already depleted French, and Bernadotte was the first of the Allied sovereigns to enter Leipzig.

After the Battle of Leipzig, he went his own way, determined at all hazards to cripple Denmark and to secure Norway, defeating the Danes in a relatively quick campaign. His efforts culminated in the favourable Treaty of Kiel, which transferred Norway to Swedish control.

The Norwegians rejected Swedish control. They declared independence, adopted a liberal constitution and elected Danish crown prince Christian Frederick to the throne. The ensuing war was swiftly won by Sweden under Charles John's generalship. The military operations in 1814 were to be Sweden's last war to this day. Charles John could have named his terms to Norway, but in a key concession accepted the Constitution of Norway and its own political autonomy. This paved the way for Norway to enter a personal union with Sweden later that year.

During the period of the Allied invasion of France in the winter and spring of 1814, when it was unclear who would rule France after the war, the Russian Tsar Alexander I, with support from French liberals like Benjamin Constant and Madame de Staël, advocated placing Charles John on the French throne in place of Napoleon. He would rule France as a Constitutional Monarch and leave Oscar as Regent in Sweden and Norway. Ultimately the British and Austrians vetoed the idea, and the Allies agreed that if Napoleon were to be deposed, the only acceptable alternative was the restoration of the House of Bourbon.

== King of Sweden and Norway ==
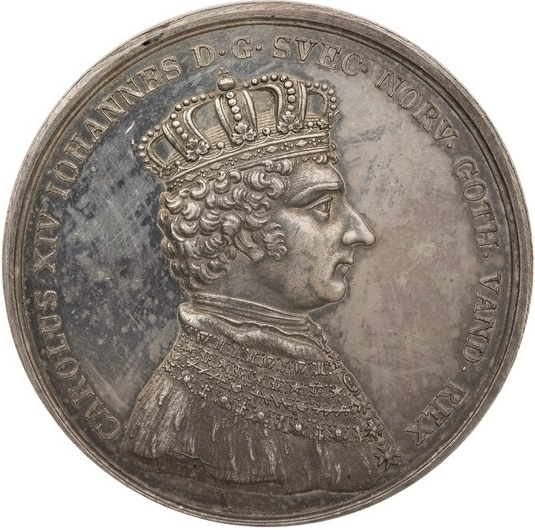
Coronation medal, 1844

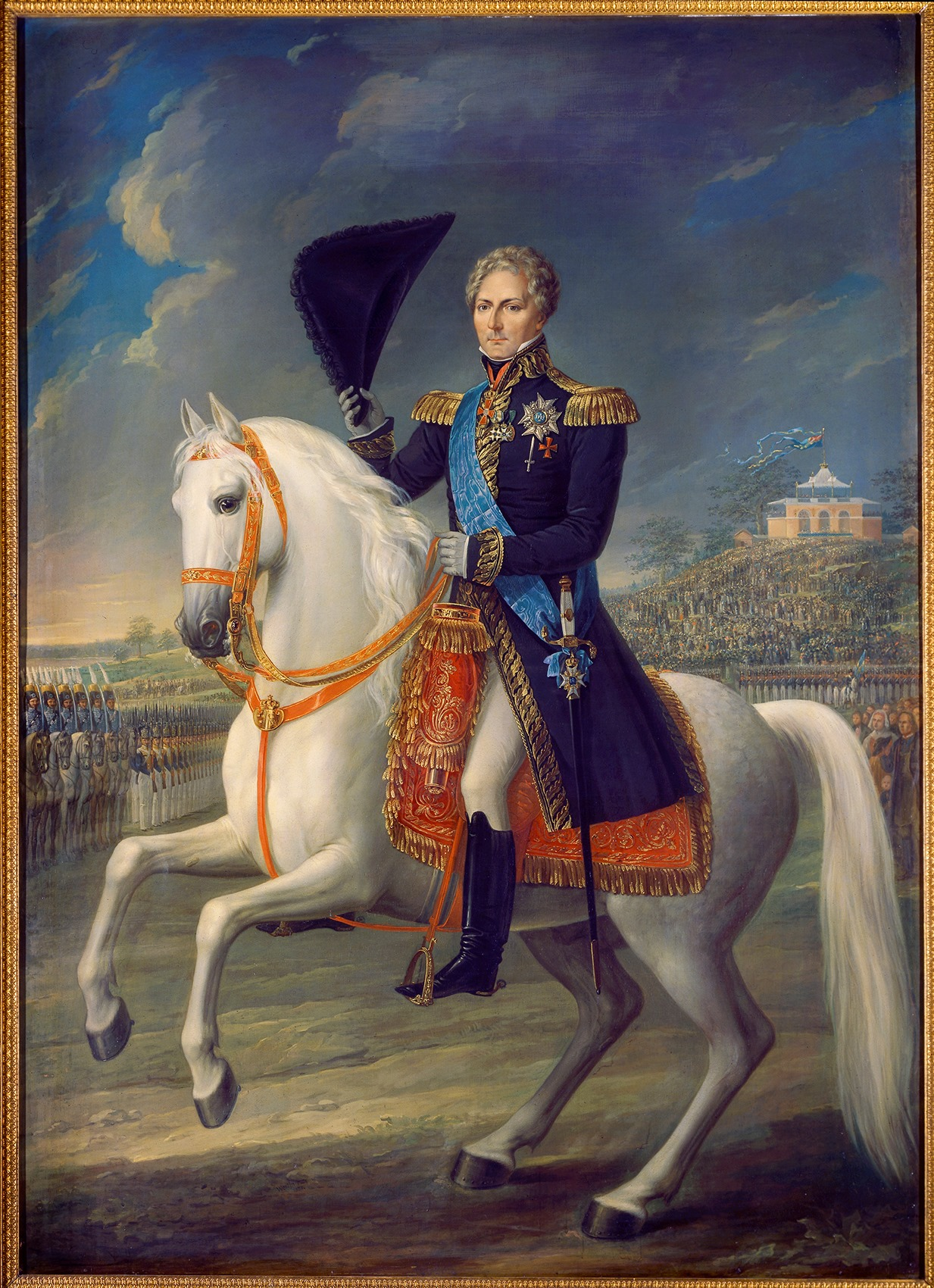
King Charles XIV John at Ladugårdsgärdet

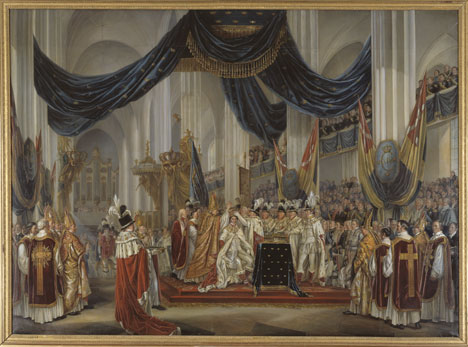
Coronation of Charles XIV John as King of Sweden in Stockholm Cathedral

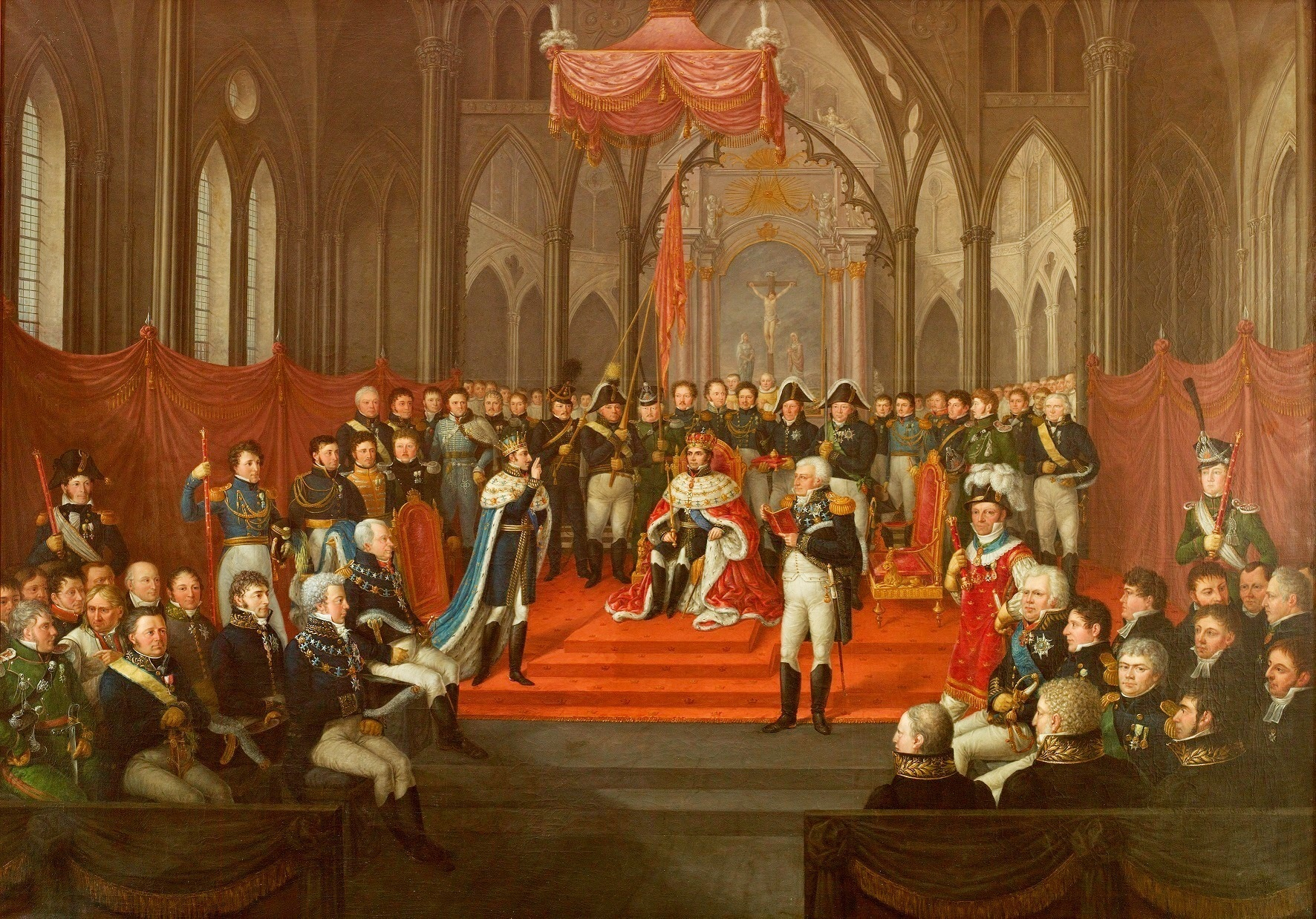
Coronation of Charles III John as King of Norway in Nidaros Cathedral, Trondheim

Charles John had been regent and de facto head of state upon his arrival, and took an increasing role in government from 1812 onward, with Charles XIII reduced to a mute witness in government councils following a stroke.

Upon Charles's death on 5 February 1818, Charles John ascended the throne. He was initially popular in both countries. The democratic process and forces steadily matured under the King's restrained executive power.

"Separated as we are from the rest of Europe, our policy, as well as our interest, will make us carefully abstain from mixing in any discussion foreign to the two people of Scandinavia; but my duty and your dignity will always be the rule of our conduct, and both one and the other prescribe to us never to permit interference in our internal affairs."

— Speech of the King on the day of taking the oaths of allegiance and homage, 19 May 1818.

The foreign policy pursued by Charles John in the post-Napoleonic era was characterized by maintaining balance among the Great Powers and avoiding involvement in conflicts outside the Scandinavian peninsula. It made a sharp contrast with Sweden's previous hegemonic expansionism, which resulted in uninterrupted wars with neighboring countries for centuries, and he successfully kept his kingdoms at peace from 1814 until his death. He was especially concerned about the conflict between the UK and Russia. In 1834, when relations between the two countries were strained over the Near East Crisis, he sent memoranda to the British and Russian governments and proclaimed neutrality in advance. It is pointed out as the origin of Swedish neutrality.

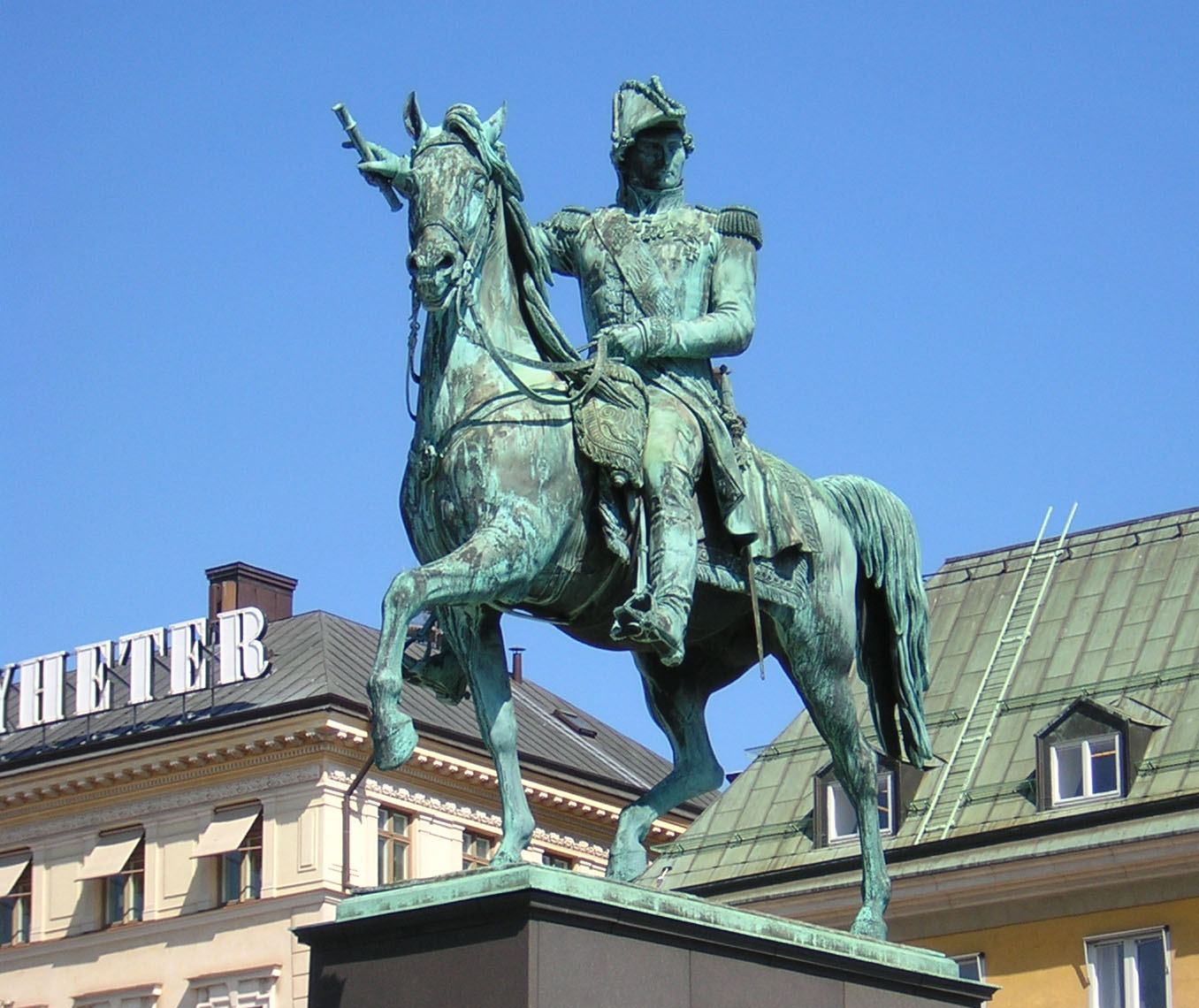
Equestrian statue in Stockholm depicting Charles XIV John

His domestic policy particularly focused on the promotion of the economy and investment in social overhead capital, and the long peace since 1814 led to an increased prosperity for the country. During his long reign of 26 years (34 years if one counts his time as regent from 1810 to 1818), the population of the Kingdom was so increased that the inhabitants of Sweden alone became equal in number to those of Sweden and Finland before the latter province was torn from the former, the national debt was paid off, a civil and a penal code were proposed for promulgation, education was promoted, agriculture, commerce, and manufactures prospered, and the means of internal communication were increased.

On the other hand, radical in his youth, his views had veered steadily to the right over the years, and by the time he ascended the throne, he was an ultra-conservative. His autocratic methods, particularly his censorship of the press, were very unpopular, especially after 1823. His dynasty faced little danger, as the Swedes and the Norwegians alike were proud of a monarch with a good European reputation.

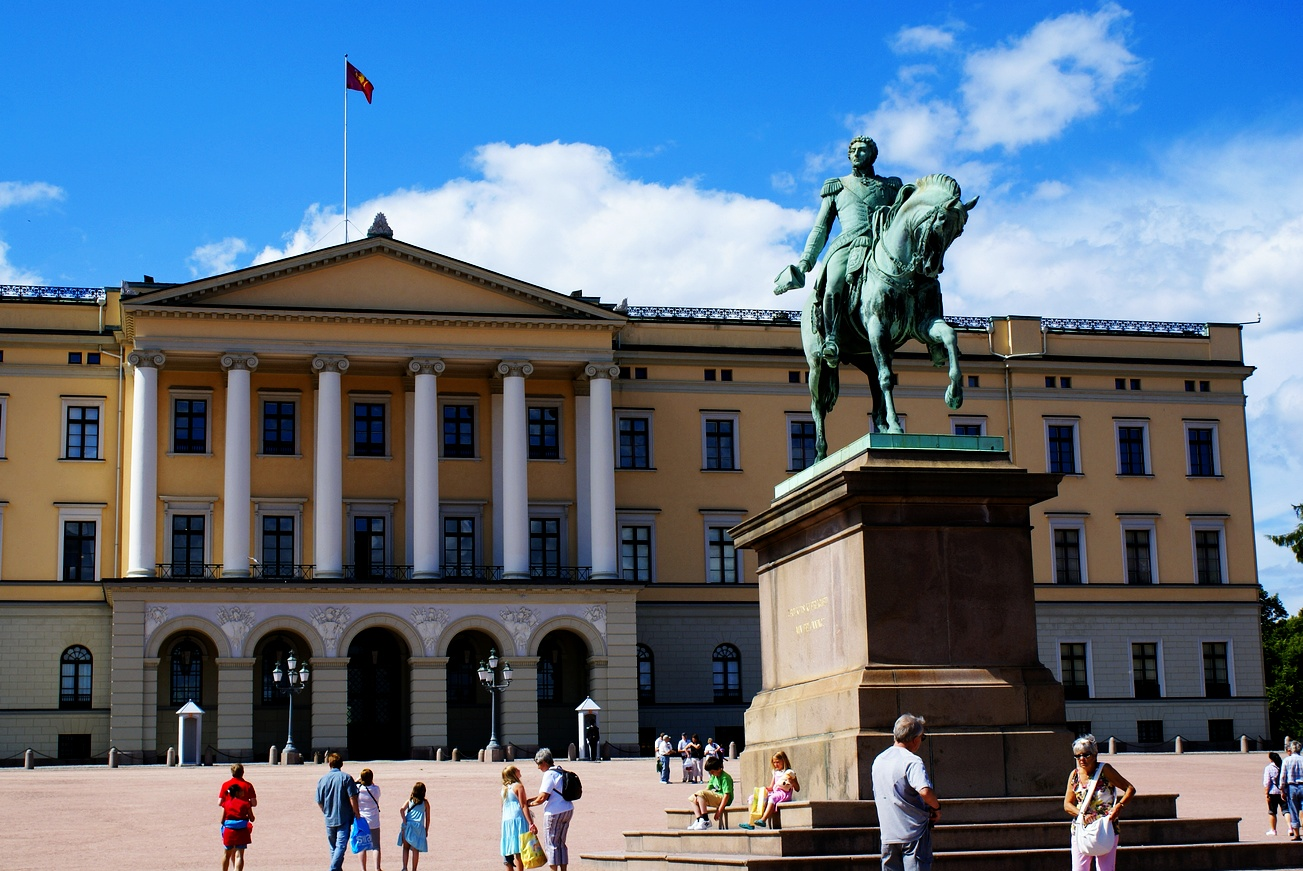
The monument outside the Royal Palace in Oslo

He also faced challenges in Norway. The Norwegian constitution gave the Norwegian parliament, the Storting, more power than any legislature in Europe. While Charles John had the power of an absolute veto in Sweden, he only had a suspensive veto in Norway. He demanded that the Storting give him the power of absolute veto, but was forced to back down. Charles John's difficult relationship with Norway was also demonstrated by the Storting's unwillingness to grant funds for the construction of a Royal Palace in the Norwegian capital Oslo. Construction began in 1825, but the Storting halted funding after the costly foundation was laid and demanded that the appointed architect, Hans Linstow, build a simpler palace. This was seen by many as a protest against unnecessary spending and the king's authority. The palace itself was not completed until 1849, long after the death of Charles John, and was inaugurated by Oscar I. The main street in Oslo, Slottsgaten, would later be named after Charles John as Karl Johans gate.

His popularity decreased for a time in the 1830s, culminating in the Rabulist riots after the Lèse-majesté conviction of the journalist Magnus Jacob Crusenstolpe, and some calls for his abdication. Charles John survived the abdication controversy and he went on to have his silver jubilee, which was celebrated with great enthusiasm on 18 February 1843. He reigned as King of Sweden and Norway from 5 February 1818 until his death on 8 March 1844.

== Death ==
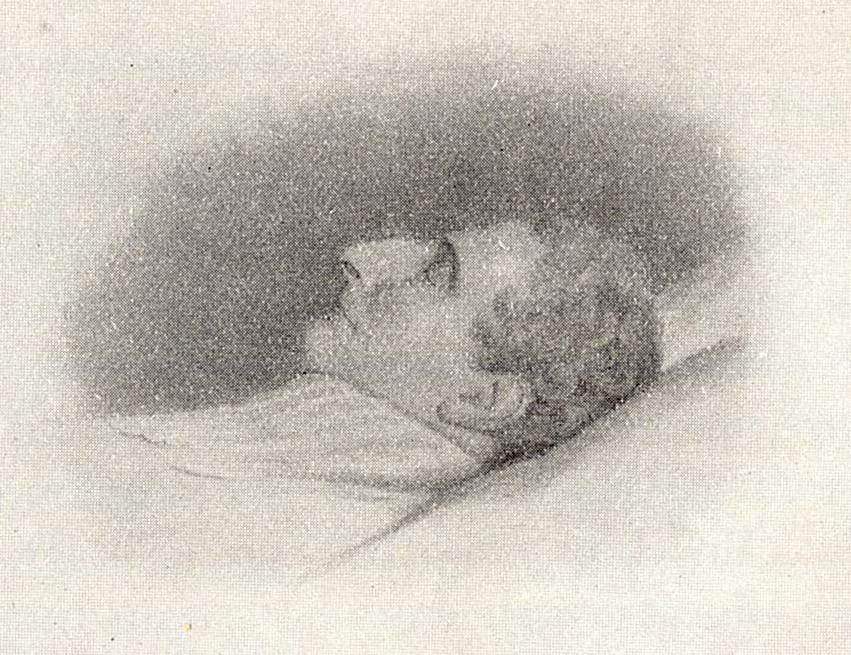
Charles John on his deathbed

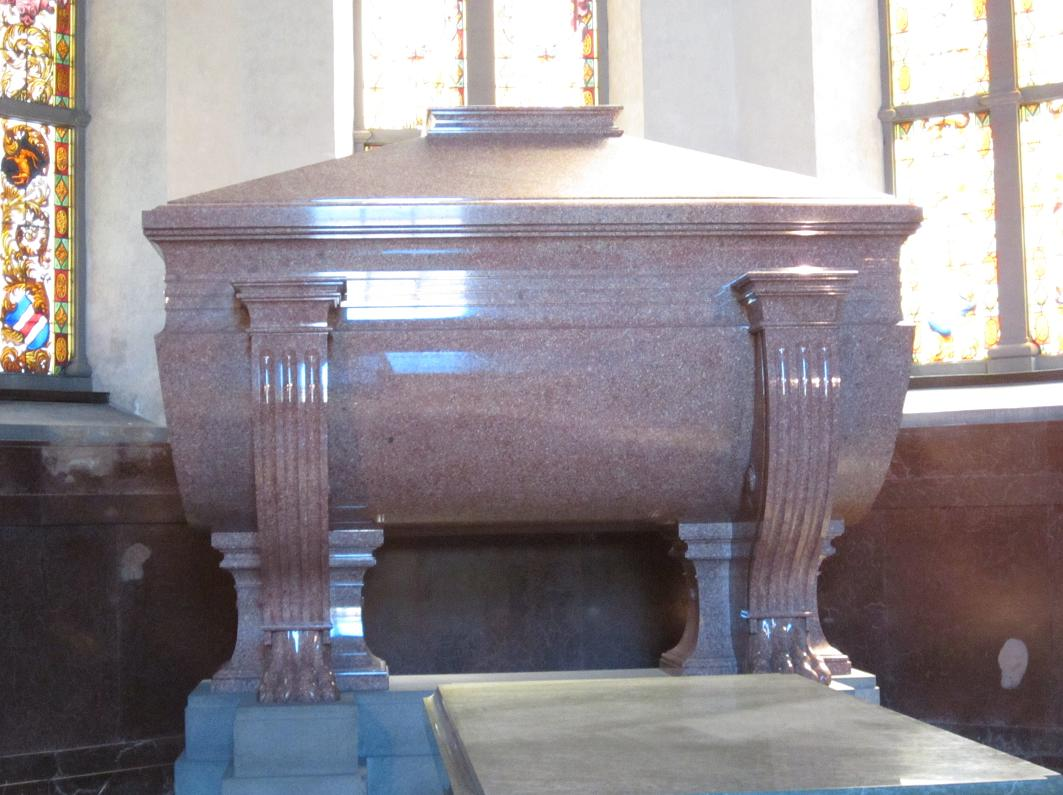
Charles John's porphyry sarcophagus

On 26 January 1844, his 81st birthday, Charles John was found unconscious in his chambers having suffered a stroke. While he regained consciousness, he never fully recovered and died on the afternoon of 8 March. On his deathbed, he was heard to say:

"Nobody has had a career in life like mine. I could perhaps have been able to agree to become Napoleon’s ally: but when he attacked the country that had placed its fate in my hands, he could find in me no other than an opponent. The events that shook Europe and that gave her back her freedom are known. It is also known which part I played in that."

His remains were interred after a state funeral in Stockholm's Riddarholmen Church. He was succeeded by his only son, Oscar I.

== Honours ==
- The main street of Oslo, Karl Johans gate, was named after him in 1852.
- The former main base for the Royal Norwegian Navy, Karljohansvern, was also named after him in 1854.
- The Karlsborg Fortress (Swedish: Karlsborgs fästning), located in present-day Karlsborg Municipality in Västra Götaland County, was also named in honour of him.
- The Caserne Bernadotte, a French military building located in Pau, was also named after him in 1875.
- The bronze equestrian statue of the King at the Royal Palace, Oslo, unveiled in 1875, is the largest bronze statue in Norway.

=== National ===
- French Empire: Knight Grand Eagle of the Legion of Honour, 2 February 1805
- Kingdom of Italy: Knight Grand Cross of the Order of the Iron Crown
- Sweden:
  - Knight of the Order of the Seraphim, 21 August 1810
  - Commander Grand Cross of the Order of the Sword, 21 August 1810
  - Knight Grand Cross of the Order of the Sword, 1st Class, 21 August 1810
  - Commander Grand Cross of the Order of the Polar Star, 21 August 1810
  - Commander Grand Cross of the Order of Vasa, 28 January 1813
  - Knight of the Order of Charles XIII, 21 August 1810

He became Lord and Master of all Swedish orders of chivalry upon his accession to the throne.

=== Foreign ===
- Kingdom of Bavaria: Knight of the Order of St. Hubert, 1805
- Kingdom of Prussia:
  - Knight of the Order of the Black Eagle, 7 April 1805
  - Knight Grand Cross of the Order of the Red Eagle, 7 April 1805
  - Grand Cross of the Iron Cross, 1813
- Kingdom of Denmark: Knight of the Order of the Elephant, 15 October 1808
- Kingdom of Saxony:
  - Knight Grand Cross of the Military Order of St. Henry, 1809
  - Knight of the Order of the Rue Crown, 1832
- Russian Empire:
  - Knight of the Order of St. Andrew, 30 August 1812
  - Knight of the Order of St. Alexander Nevsky, 30 August 1812
  - Knight of the Order of St. Anna, 1st Class
  - Knight of the Order of St. George, 1st Class, 30 August 1813
- Austrian Empire: Knight Grand Cross of the Military Order of Maria Theresa, 1813
- Kingdom of Spain: Knight of the Order of the Golden Fleece, 2 September 1822
- Grand Duchy of Baden:
  - Knight Grand Cross of the House Order of Fidelity, 1830
  - Knight Grand Cross of the Order of the Zähringer Lion, 1830
- Kingdom of Portugal: Knight Grand Cross of the Order of the Tower and Sword

=== Arms and monogram ===
Prince of Pontecorvo	Coat of arms of Charles John as Crown Prince of Sweden (1810–1814)	Coat of arms of Charles John as Crown Prince of Sweden and Norway (1814–1818)	Coat of arms of King Charles XIV John of Sweden and Norway (1818–1844)

== Fictional portrayals ==
Louis-Émile Vanderburch and Ferdinand Langlé's 1833 play Le Camarade de lit ("The Bedfellow") depicts Bernadotte as King of Sweden. In it, an old grenadier claims that, as a young man, Bernadotte received a tattoo of a scandalous republican motto: either Mort aux Rois ("Death to kings"), or Mort aux tyrans ("Death to tyrants"), or Mort au Roi ("Death to the king"). The tattoo is finally revealed to read Vive la république ("Long live the Republic") and a Phrygian cap: a highly ironic image and text for the skin of a king. This play was so popular that the idea that King Charles XIV John had a tattoo reading "Death to kings" is often repeated as fact, although there is no basis to it. He publicly proclaimed himself in 1797 "a Republican both by principle and conviction" who would “to the moment of my death, oppose all Royalists and enemies to the Directory".

Désirée Clary's relationships with Bonaparte and Bernadotte were the subject of the novel Désirée by Annemarie Selinko. The novel was filmed as Désirée in 1954, with Marlon Brando as Napoleon, Jean Simmons as Désirée, and Michael Rennie as Bernadotte.

Bernadotte is a primary supporting character in the historical fiction novel by New York Times Bestselling author Allison Pataki A Queen's Fortune: A Novel of Désirée, Napoleon, and the Dynasty that outlasted the Empire, that tells the life story of his wife (and Queen of Sweden and Norway) Désirée Clary.

== See also ==
- Swedish–Norwegian War (1814)
- Union between Sweden and Norway
- Napoleonic Wars
- War of the Sixth Coalition
- War of the Seventh Coalition

== Notes ==
Charles XIV/III John House of Bernadotte Born: 26 January 1763 Died: 8 March 1844
Regnal titles
Preceded by Charles XIII/II	King of Sweden and Norway; 5 February 1818 – 8 March 1844	Succeeded by Oscar I
New title	Prince of Pontecorvo; 5 June 1806 – 21 August 1810	Vacant Title next held by Lucien Murat
Political offices
Preceded by Louis de Mureau	Minister of War of France; 2 July 1799 – 14 September 1799	Succeeded by Edmond Dubois-Crancé
