= Pontecorvo =

- Comune
- Comune di Pontecorvo
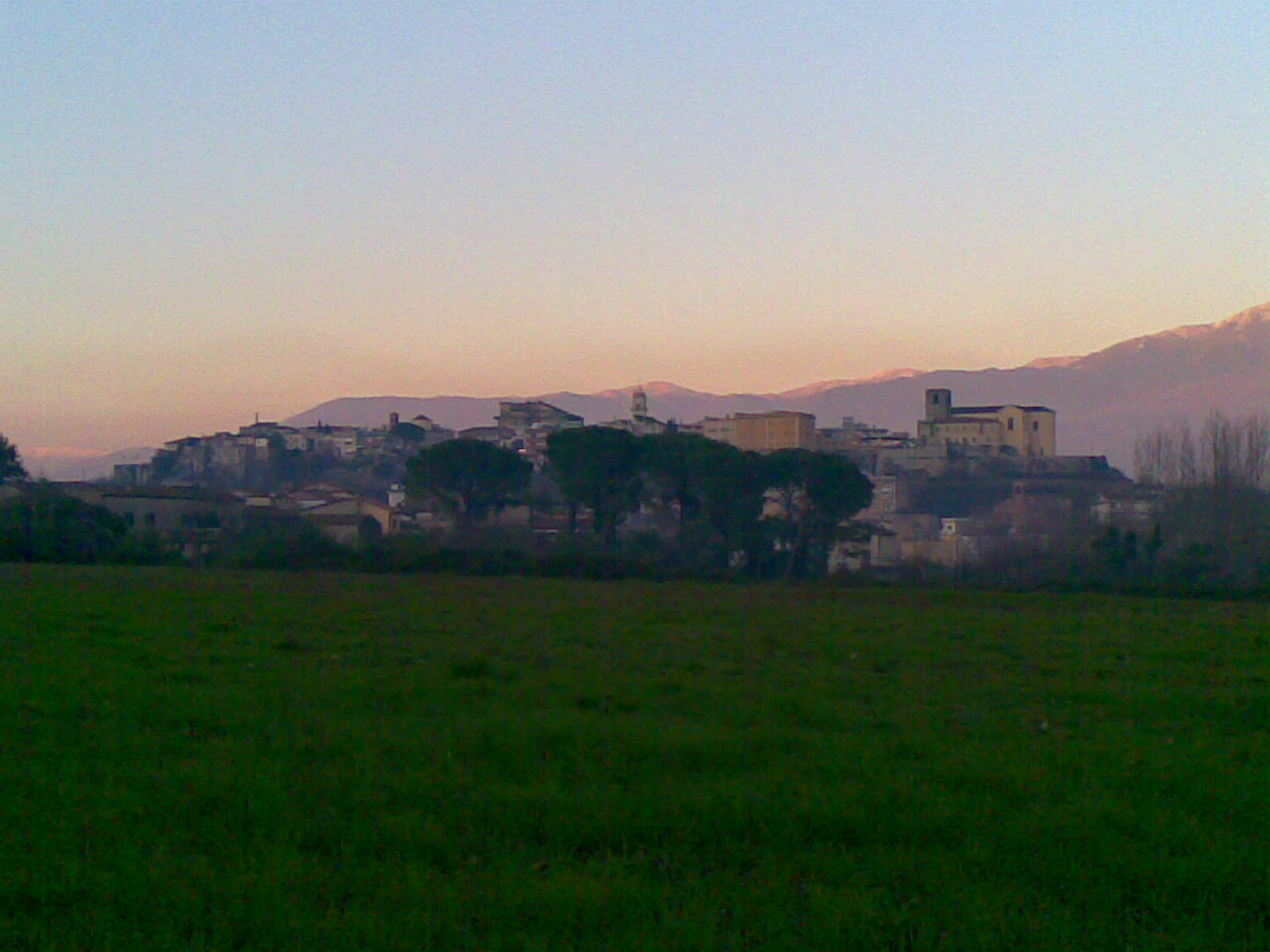
- View of Pontecorvo

- Flag Coat of arms

- Location within Italy Location within Lazio
- Coordinates: 41°27′N 13°40′E
- Country: Italy
- Region: Lazio
- Province: Frosinone (FR)
- Frazioni: San Cosma, Sant'Oliva

Government
  - Mayor: Anselmo Rotondo

Area
  - Total: 88.8 km^{2} (34.3 sq mi)
- Elevation: 97 m (318 ft)

Population (30 November 2021)
  - Total: 12,831
  - Density: 144/km^{2} (374/sq mi)
- Demonym: Pontecorvesi
- Time zone: UTC+1 (CET)
  - Summer (DST): UTC+2 (CEST)
- Postal code: 03037
- Dialing code: 0776
- Website: Official website

Pontecorvo is a town and comune in the province of Frosinone, Lazio, Italy. Its population is c. 13,200. The village lies under Rocca Guglielma, a medieval fortification perched on an inaccessible spur. Its name derives from the pons curvus, "curved bridge", that may still be seen spanning the Liri in the center of the town that grew around the bridgehead in the course of the Middle Ages. The curve of the bridge was intended to divert timbers that might strike its piers during floods.

The folk etymology of corvo, "crow", symbol of the "black monks", the Benedictines of the abbey of Monte Cassino, within whose secular territory, the Terra Sancti Benedicti, Pontecorvo lay, is displayed in the town's modern coat-of-arms, which represents a crow surmounting a curved bridge. The town was destroyed during World War II, and rebuilt in a modern style.

== Roman times ==
In Roman times the agricultural region was governed from Aquinum, the modern Aquino. Some Roman remains have been retrieved from a villa site at Sant'Oliva. The medieval commune dates from 860, when Rodoaldo, the Lombard gastaldo of Aquino, erected the first version of the walled fortification on the rocca, intended to guard the bridgehead from Saracen intruders coming up the Liri. The castle's chapel seems to have been dedicated to Saint Bartholomew; on the ruins of the Lombard castello was erected the earliest Cathedral of San Bartolomeo of which the campanile was a rebuilding of the castellan's tower. Two medieval quarters developed, Cività within the walls and Pastine in the meadows between the city walls and the river. The little bridgehead settlement formed part of the County of Capua; there in 866 Louis II, Holy Roman Emperor, set up camp at Pontecorvo in campaigns against the Saracens. In 960 Atenulf succeeded in attaching Pontecorvo to his gastaldate of Aquino; at his death his lands were divided into a county of Aquino and a county of Pontecorvo.

In 1065 the Normans conquered the region and attached Pontecorvo to the Norman county of Gaeta, but the abbot of Monte Cassino purchased it in 1105, and maintained a precarious hold on it for over four centuries. The first communal statute, among the earliest in the Kingdom of Naples, was granted in 1190, signalling a new era of civic self-confidence in a period in which Pontecorvo was briefly conquered and ruled by Roger II of Sicily, was claimed by the papacy, and was sacked by Charles of Anjou. During the Western Schism, Pontecorvo allied with antipope Clement VII in opposition to the local power of Monte Cassino.

Although just within the territory of the Kingdom of Naples, the town was an exclave of the Papal States from 1463, when the comune placed itself under papal jurisdiction, until it was captured by the French army in the Napoleonic Wars.

== Principality ==
Coat of arms of Jean-Baptiste Jules Bernadotte

After having been proclaimed King of Italy in 1805 and occupied the neighboring Kingdom of Naples, Napoleon created the Principality of Pontecorvo, the principality being for his General Jean Baptiste Jules Bernadotte, who would become both King Charles XIV John of Sweden and King Charles III of Norway. The principality was nominally sovereign, but the Prince did have to take an oath to the King.

Bernadotte was the first Prince of Pontecorvo and was as such styled Prince Bernadotte. He was subsequently elected Crown Prince of Sweden and then agreed to give up Pontecorvo, but under conditions that never were resolved. He was partially compensated with the French colony of Guadeloupe. Later, he gave up Guadeloupe for a payment which established the Guadeloupe Fund. Since his accession as King of Sweden in 1818, the arms of Pontecorvo have been a part of the Swedish Greater Coat of Arms.

Prince Napoleon Lucien Charles Murat was the son of Joachim Murat, King of Naples. Though the reign of the Murat family over Pontecorvo lasted only three years and ended in 1815, the descendants of Prince Lucien still unofficially use "Prince of Pontecorvo" as the courtesy title of the heir to the Prince Murat. It is currently used by Joachim Murat, who was born in 1973.

The principality was short-lived. In 1815, after the Napoleonic Wars, the town was ceded back to the Papal States.

== Republic ==
Pontecorvo within the Papal States, 1849

In 1820 the Republic of Pontecorvo seceded from the Papal States. It had unilaterally declared independence from the Papal States in 1820 at a time of unrest in the neighbouring Kingdom of Two Sicilies. The principality was returned to the Papal States in the Congress of Vienna.

The Carbonari, a secret revolutionary political organisation which had also been stirring unrest in Naples, proclaimed the republics of Pontecorvo and Benevento on 4 August 1820. The liberalised Spanish constitution was adopted by the government of the both republics. They requested twice unsuccessfully to join the Kingdom of the Two Sicilies, which refused to negotiate the affairs of either state except through the Pope.

Forces of the Austrian Empire occupied Pontecorvo on 17 March 1821 and restored it to the Papal States, putting an end to the republic. However, sects of the Carbonari remained in Pontecorvo in spite of the revolution's failure.

== Modern history ==
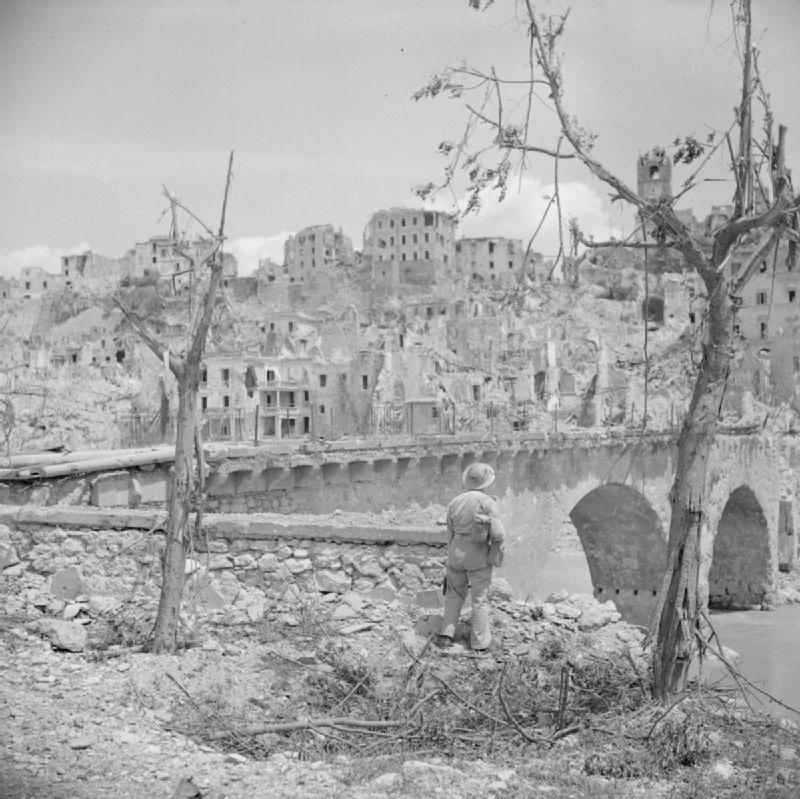
Ruins of Pontecorvo following fighting between Allied and German forces, May 1944

In 1860 it joined Benevento, the other southern Italian papal enclave, in being united with the new Kingdom of Italy. The town was destroyed during World War II, and rebuilt in a modern style.
