= Prince Carl, Duke of Västergötland =

Swedish prince (1861–1951)

Prince Carl
- Duke of Västergötland
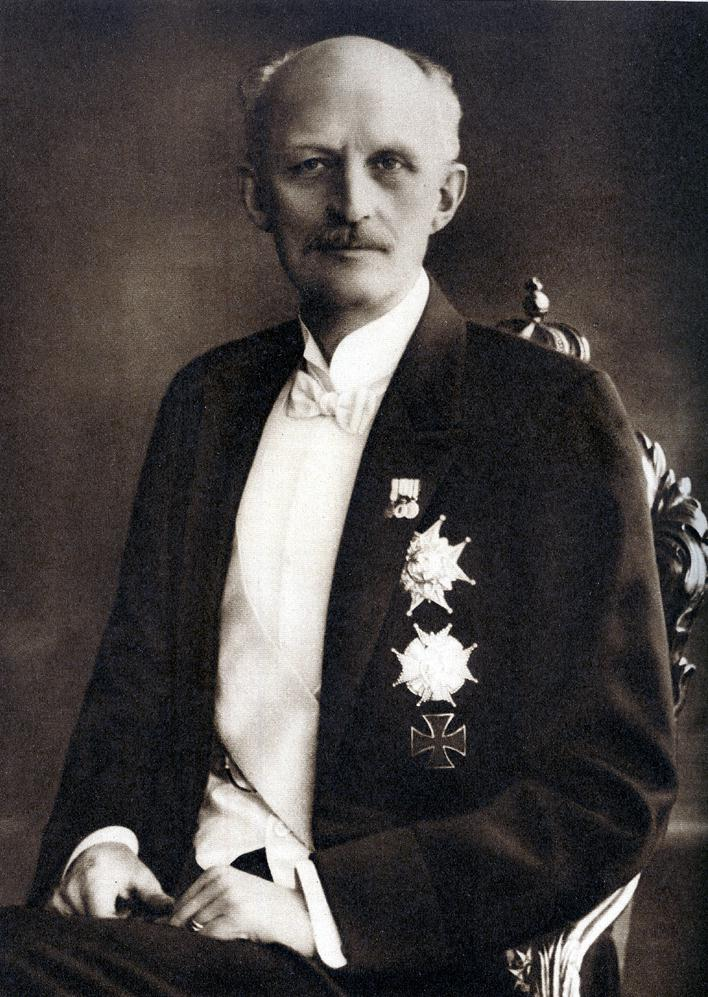
- Photograph of Prince Carl, c. 1930
- Born: 27 February 1861; Arvfurstens palats, Stockholm, Sweden
- Died: 24 October 1951 (aged 90); Stockholm, Sweden
- Burial: 2 November 1951; Royal Cemetery, Solna, Sweden
- Spouse: Princess Ingeborg of Denmark (m. 1897)
- Issue: Margaretha, Princess Axel of Denmark; Märtha, Crown Princess of Norway; Astrid, Queen of the Belgians; Prince Carl Bernadotte
Names
- Oscar Carl Wilhelm
- House: Bernadotte
- Father: Oscar II of Sweden
- Mother: Sophia of Nassau

Prince Carl of Sweden and Norway, Duke of Västergötland (27 February 1861 – 24 October 1951) was a Swedish prince. Through his daughters Märtha and Astrid, for whom he arranged dynastic marriages, he is an ancestor of current members of the Grand Ducal Family of Luxembourg, Belgian royal family and Norwegian royal family.

== Early life ==
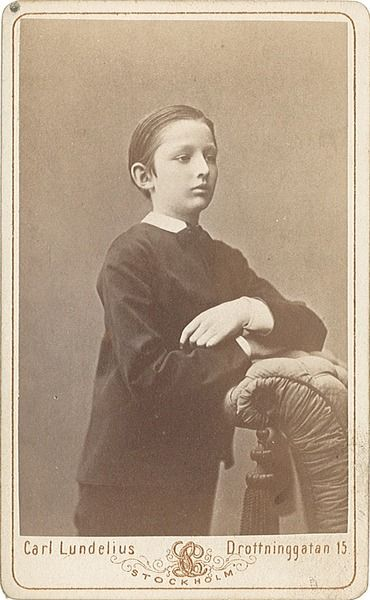
Prince Carl of Sweden and Norway as a child, 1869

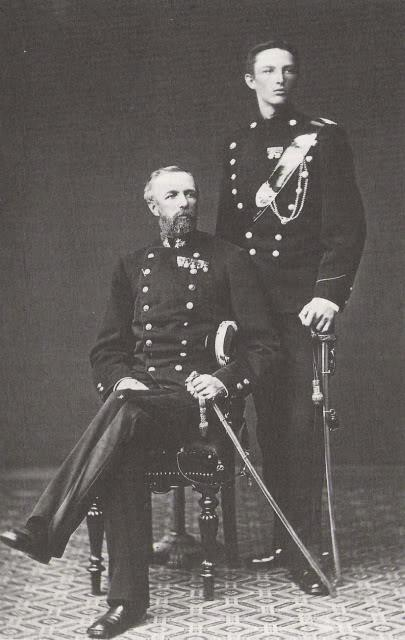
King Oscar II of Sweden and his son Prince Carl, Duke of Västergötland, 1879

Prince Carl was born on 27 February 1861 at his parents' residence in the Arvfurstens palats (Palace of the Hereditary Prince), an 18th-century palace located at Gustav Adolfs Torg in central Stockholm. Born into the House of Bernadotte, he was the third son and child of the then Prince Oscar and Princess Sophia. His father was the younger brother and heir presumptive of the reigning king of Sweden-Norway, the sonless King Charles XV, and his mother was the youngest daughter of Wilhelm, Duke of Nassau. Upon the death of Charles XV on 18 September 1872, Carl's father ascended the Swedish and Norwegian thrones as King Oscar II.

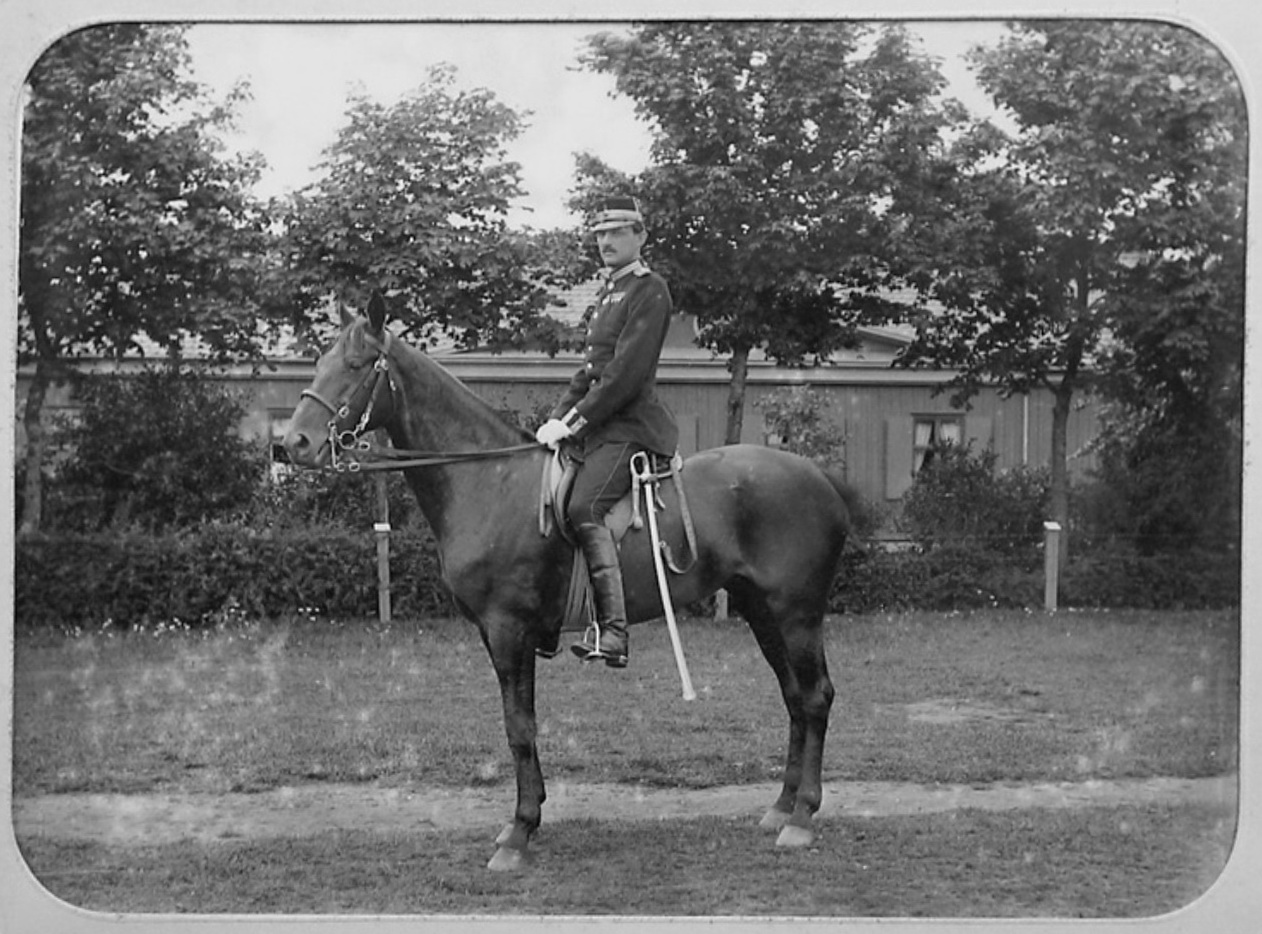
Equestrian portrait of the Duke of Västergötland by Jules David, 1894

Carl was known as "the Blue Prince" (Blå Prinsen) because he often wore the blue-coloured uniform of the Life Regiment, to which he belonged in a ceremonial manner.

== Marriage and children ==
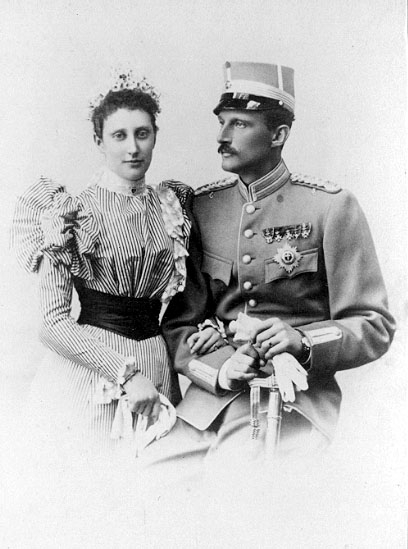
Princess Ingeborg and Prince Carl in 1897.

In May 1897, Prince Carl was engaged at the age of 36 to the 18-year-old Princess Ingeborg of Denmark, the second daughter of King Frederik VIII of Denmark. Ingeborg's mother, Louise of Sweden, was a first cousin of Prince Carl, and they were, therefore, first cousins once-removed. The engagement was arranged, and in 1947, on the occasion of their 50th wedding anniversary, Carl admitted that their marriage had been completely arranged by their respective fathers, and Ingeborg herself added: "I married a complete stranger!"

The couple were married on 27 August 1897 at the chapel of Christiansborg Palace in Copenhagen and spent their wedding trip (honeymoon) in Germany. The couple had four children:

1. Margaretha (1899–1977), who married Prince Axel of Denmark
2. Märtha (1901–1954), wife of Crown Prince Olav (later Olav V) of Norway and mother of Harald V of Norway
3. Astrid (1905–1935), wife of Leopold III of Belgium and mother of kings Baudouin and Albert II of Belgium, as well as Grand Duchess Joséphine Charlotte of Luxembourg.
4. Prince Carl, Duke of Östergötland, known as Carl Jr., later Prince Bernadotte (1911–2003).

All of Carl's children grew up to be healthy adults. While all three daughters made dynastic marriages that were encouraged by their parents, and became the matriarchs of their own successful families, the couple's only son gave up his (highly improbable) chance of succeeding to the throne to marry a noblewoman.

== Candidate for the Norwegian throne ==
In 1905, during the political struggle in which Norway obtained its independence from Sweden, Prince Carl was seriously considered as a candidate for the Norwegian crown. It was thought that electing a Swedish prince as king was a less radical way for Norway to secede from the union, and hence a more peaceful approach. Carl was chosen because his eldest brother would inherit the Swedish throne, and his second brother had renounced his royal status to make an unsuitable marriage. However, Carl's father King Oscar II of Sweden did not approve of the proposal, as he saw the whole "riot" which precipitated the Norwegian crisis as a conspiracy and a betrayal against his rights as King of Norway, and he did not want any of his sons to be involved with people whom he considered his enemies. Therefore, Prince Carl never became King of Norway. Instead, another Prince Carl – Prince Carl of Denmark – brother of Ingeborg, was elected after some diplomatic turbulence, taking the name Haakon VII. As history turned out however, the Duke of Västergötland's daughter, Princess Märtha, married Haakon VII's son, who later became King Olav V. Hence, the present King, Haakon VIII of Norway, is a great-grandchild of the duke.

== Descendants ==
Prince Carl has the distinction of being a grandfather of three European monarchs: the late King Harald V of Norway (son of his daughter, Princess Märtha), the late King Baudouin and his brother, King Albert II of Belgium (sons of his daughter, Princess Astrid). He is also a great-grandfather of King Philippe of the Belgians, King Haakon VIII of Norway and Grand Duke Henri of Luxembourg; and a great-great-grandfather of Grand Duke Guillaume V of Luxembourg.

== Honours ==
National honours

- Knight and Commander of the Seraphim, 27 February 1861
- Knight of the Order of Charles XIII, 27 February 1861
- Commander Grand Cross of the Sword, 27 February 1861
- Commander Grand Cross of the Polar Star, 27 February 1861
- Commander Grand Cross of the Order of Vasa, 28 April 1892
- Honorary Member of the Johanniter Order

Foreign honours

- Norway:
  - Grand Cross of St. Olav, with Collar, 27 February 1861
  - Knight of the Norwegian Lion, 21 January 1904
  - King Haakon VII Freedom Cross
- Austria: Grand Cross of the Decoration of Honour for Services to the Republic of Austria
- Belgium: Grand Cordon of the Order of Leopold
- (Tsardom of Bulgaria (1908–1946)) Bulgarian Royal Family: Grand Cross of St. Alexander, 1921
- Estonia: Order of the Red Cross, 1st Class
- Finland: Grand Cross of the Cross of Liberty, 1 October 1918
- France: Grand Cross of the Legion of Honour
- (Greece) Greek Royal Family: Grand Cross of the Redeemer
- (Kingdom of Hungary) Hungarian Royal Family: Grand Cross of the Royal Hungarian Order of St. Stephen, 1885
- (Kingdom of Italy) Italian Royal Family: Knight of the Annunciation, 5 July 1913
- Denmark:
  - Knight of the Elephant, 31 August 1883
  - Commemorative Medal for the Golden Wedding of King Christian IX and Queen Louise, 1892
  - Cross of Honour of the Order of the Dannebrog, 27 August 1897
  - King Christian IX Centenary Medal, 1918
  - King Frederik VIII Centenary Medal, 1943
  - Red Cross Badge of Honor
- (German Empire) German Imperial and Royal Family:
  - Knight of the Black Eagle
  - Grand Cross of the Red Eagle
  - (Grand Duchy of Baden) Baden Grand Ducal Family:
    - Knight of the House Order of Fidelity, 1881
    - Knight of the Order of Berthold the First, 1881
  - (Duchy of Nassau) Nassau Ducal Family: Knight of the Gold Lion of Nassau
  - (Saxe-Weimar-Eisenach) Saxe-Weimar Grand Ducal Family: Grand Cross of the White Falcon, 1881
- Latvia: Commander Grand Cross of the Three Stars
- Monaco: Grand Cross of St. Charles, 5 August 1884
- Netherlands: Grand Cross of the Netherlands Lion
- (Ottoman Empire) Turkish Imperial Family: Order of Osmanieh, 1st Class
- Poland: Grand Cross of Polonia Restituta
- (Kingdom of Portugal) Portuguese Royal Family: Grand Cross of the Tower and Sword
- (Kingdom of Romania) Romanian Royal Family: Grand Cross of the Star of Romania
- (Russian Empire) Russian Imperial Family:
  - Knight of St. Andrew
  - Knight of St. Alexander Nevsky
  - Knight of the White Eagle
  - Knight of St. Anna, 1st Class
  - Knight of St. Stanislaus, 1st Class
- (Thailand) Siam: Knight of the Order of the Royal House of Chakri, 13 July 1897
- United Kingdom: Honorary Grand Cross of the Royal Victorian Order, 18 April 1904

=== Arms ===
Arms as Prince of Sweden and Norway, Duke of Västergötland 1861 to 1905

Arms as Prince of Sweden and Duke of Västergötland after 1907

Prince Carl, Duke of Västergötland House of Bernadotte Born: 27 February 1861 Died: 24 October 1951
Swedish royalty
| New title | Duke of Västergötland; 1861–1951 | Vacant Title next held by Victoria |
