= Kungliga begravningsplatsen =

Burial place of the Swedish royal family on the island of Karlsborg, Sweden

Coordinates: 59.356°N 18.046°E

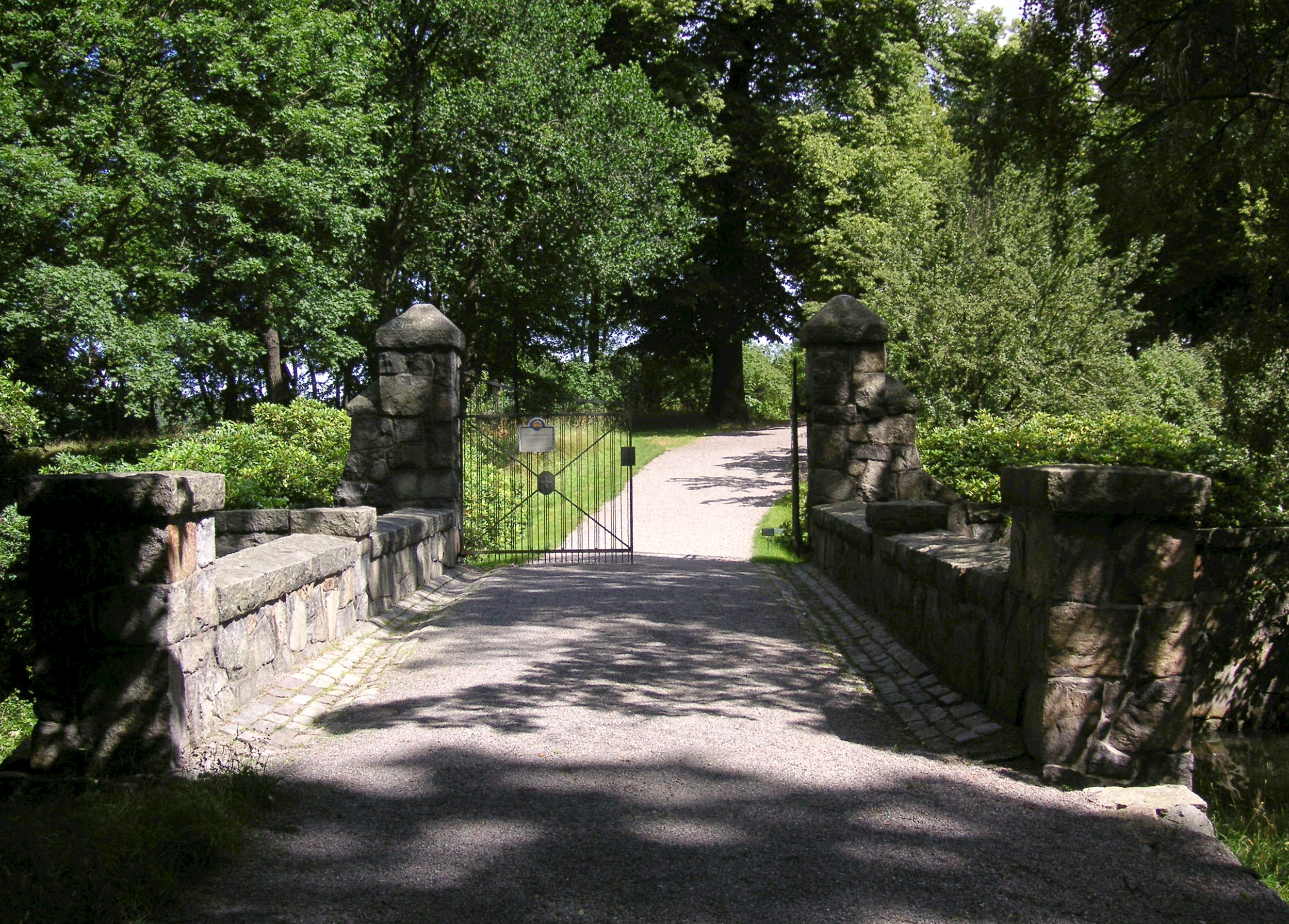
The bridge and gates to the cemetery in Haga Park

Kungliga begravningsplatsen, known in English as the Royal Cemetery, was first used in 1922 and has been the only official burial place of the Swedish royal family since 1950, succeeding Riddarholmen Church as such. When Gustaf VI Adolf was buried here, he was the first Swedish king since Charles IX (in 1612) to be buried outside of the old church at Riddarholmen. The cemetery takes up all of the small island of Karlsborg in the bay of Brunnsviken. The cemetery is part of the popular Haga Park in Solna, Sweden.

The little bridge from the mainland's park to the island and the large cruciform monument by the highest grave were designed by Ferdinand Boberg.

== Burials ==
=== Buried at the cemetery ===
- Crown Princess Margareta of Sweden, Duchess of Scania, born Princess of United Kingdom (1882–1920), first wife of King Gustaf VI Adolf
- Prince Gustaf Adolf of Sweden, Duke of Västerbotten (1906–1947), son of King Gustaf VI Adolf
- Prince Carl of Sweden, Duke of Västergötland (1861–1951), son of King Oscar II
- Princess Ingeborg of Sweden, Duchess of Västergötland, born Princess of Denmark (1878–1958), widow of Prince Carl, Duke of Västergötland
- Queen Louise of Sweden, born Princess of Battenberg (1889–1965), second wife of King Gustaf VI Adolf
- Princess Sibylla of Sweden, Duchess of Västerbotten, born Princess of Saxe-Coburg and Gotha (1908–1972), widow of Prince Gustaf Adolf, Duke of Västerbotten
- King Gustaf VI Adolf of Sweden (1882–1973), son of King Gustaf V
- Prince Bertil of Sweden, Duke of Halland (1912–1997), son of King Gustaf VI Adolf
- Prince Sigvard Bernadotte, Count of Wisborg, born Prince of Sweden and Duke of Uppland (1907–2002), son of King Gustaf VI Adolf
- Prince Carl Bernadotte, born Prince of Sweden and Duke of Östergötland (1911–2003), son of Prince Carl, Duke of Västergötland
- Prince Carl Johan Bernadotte, Count of Wisborg, born Prince of Sweden and Duke of Dalarna (1916–2012), son of King Gustaf VI Adolf
- Princess Lilian of Sweden, Duchess of Halland (1915–2013), widow of Prince Bertil, Duke of Halland
- Princess Kristine Bernadotte, Countess of Wisborg (1932–2014), widow of Prince Carl Bernadotte
- Princess Gunnila Bernadotte, Countess of Wisborg, born Countess Wachtmeister af Johannishus (1923–2016), widow of Carl Johan Bernadotte
- Princess Birgitta of Sweden, Princess of Hohenzollern-Sigmaringen (1937–2024), daughter of Prince Gustaf Adolf, Duke of Västerbotten
- Princess Marianne Bernadotte, Countess of Wisborg, born Gullan Marianne Lindberg (1924–2025), widow of Prince Sigvard Bernadotte

=== Family buried elsewhere after 1922 ===
- Queen Victoria of Sweden (1862–1930), wife of King Gustaf V, buried in Riddarholmen Church
- Princess Ebba Bernadotte (née Ebba Munck af Fulkila 1858–1946), wife of Prince Oscar Bernadotte, buried at Stockholm's Northern Cemetery in Solna
- Prince Eugen, Duke of Närke (1865–1947), son of King Oscar II, ashes buried at Waldemarsudde
- King Gustaf V of Sweden (1858–1950), son of King Oscar II, buried in Riddarholmen Church
- Prince Oscar Bernadotte (1859–1953), son of King Oscar II, buried at Stockholm's Northern Cemetery in Solna
- Prince Vilhelm, Duke of Södermanland (1884–1965), son of King Gustaf V, buried at Flen Cemetery, Flen, with his daughter-in-law Karin Bernadotte
- Lennart Bernadotte, born Prince of Sweden (1909–2004), son of Prince Wilhelm, Duke of Södermanland, buried at Mainau with his second wife Sonja Bernadotte and mother Maria of Russia (former princess of Sweden)

== Public access ==
The island and the public areas of Haga Park are part of Solna's and Stockholm's protected Royal National City Park area. That large park itself is public, open year-round for visitors at no charge; the cemetery is open for visitors May–August (Thursdays 1 P.M. to 3 P.M.).

== Gallery ==
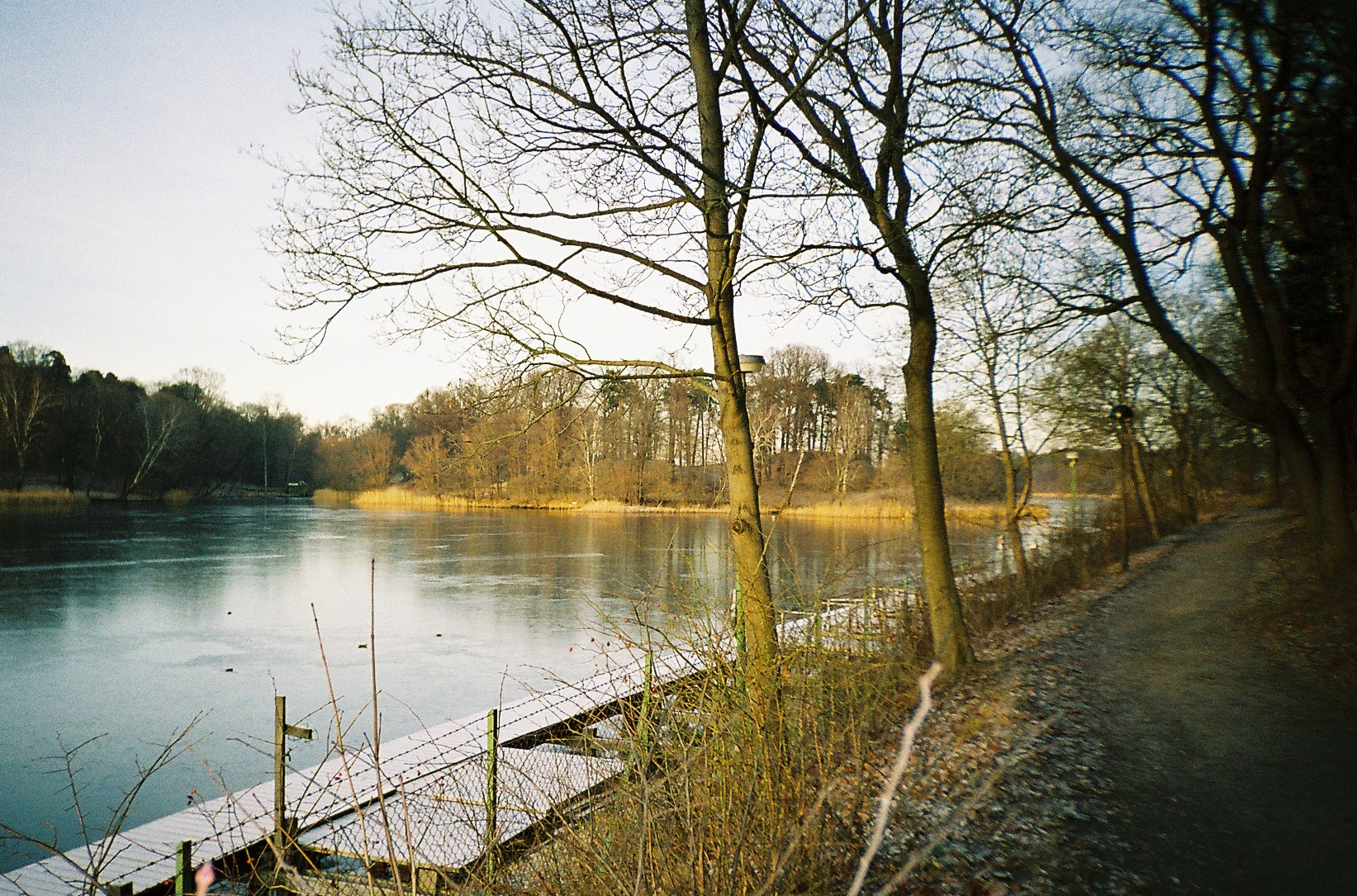
The entire island of Karlsborg in winter

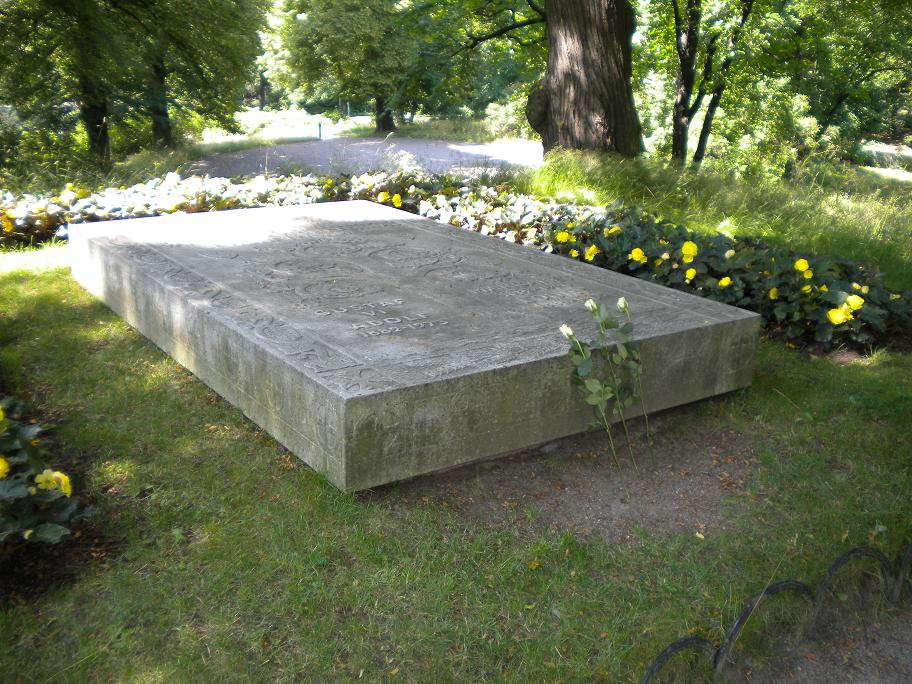
Grave of King Gustaf VI Adolf, Queen Louise and Crown Princess Margareta

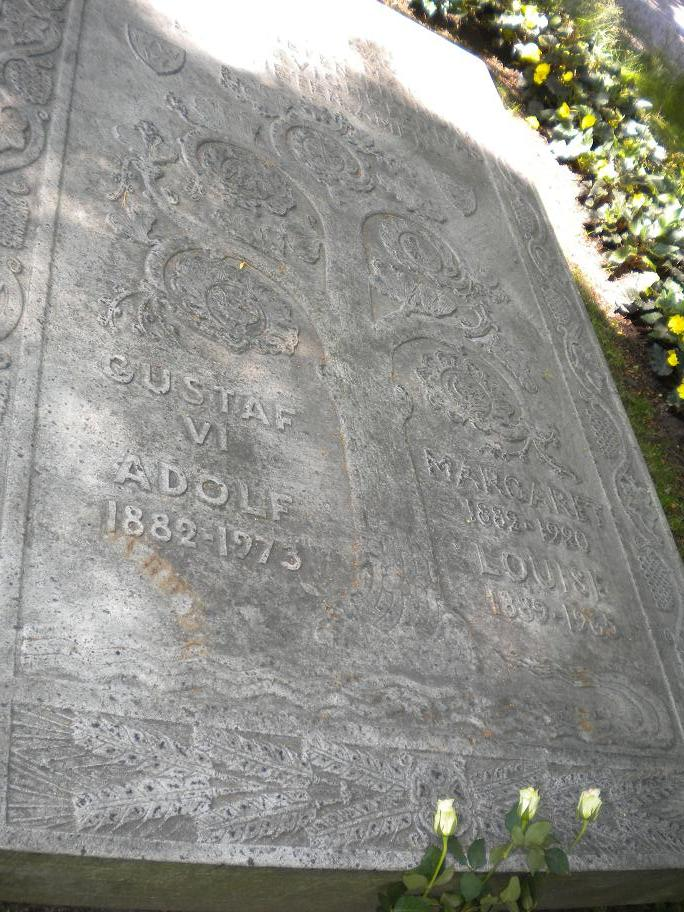
Close-up of the grave of King Gustaf VI Adolf, Queen Louise and Crown Princess Margareta

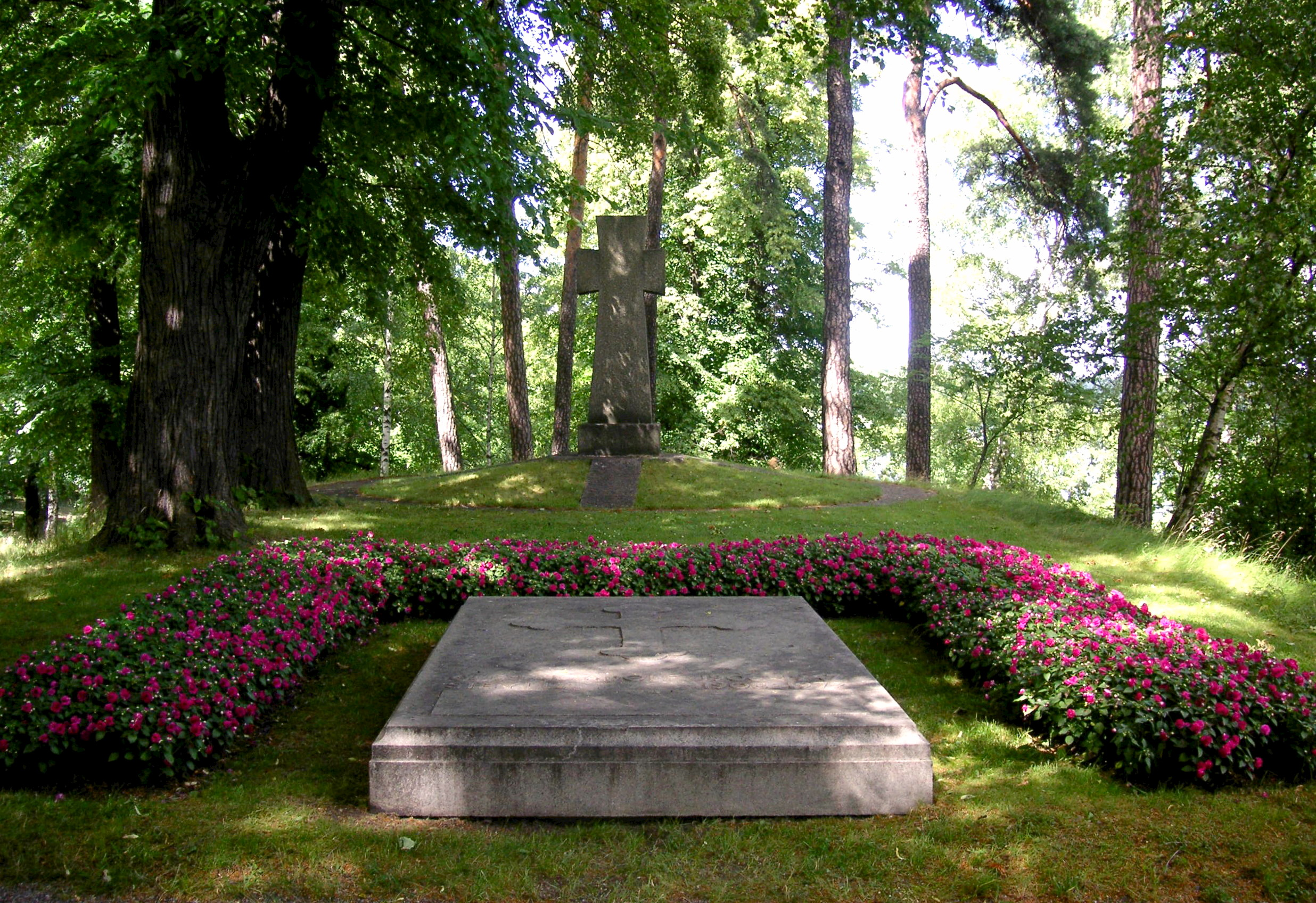
Grave of Prince Gustaf Adolf and Princess Sibylla, parents of the present King Carl XVI Gustaf of Sweden

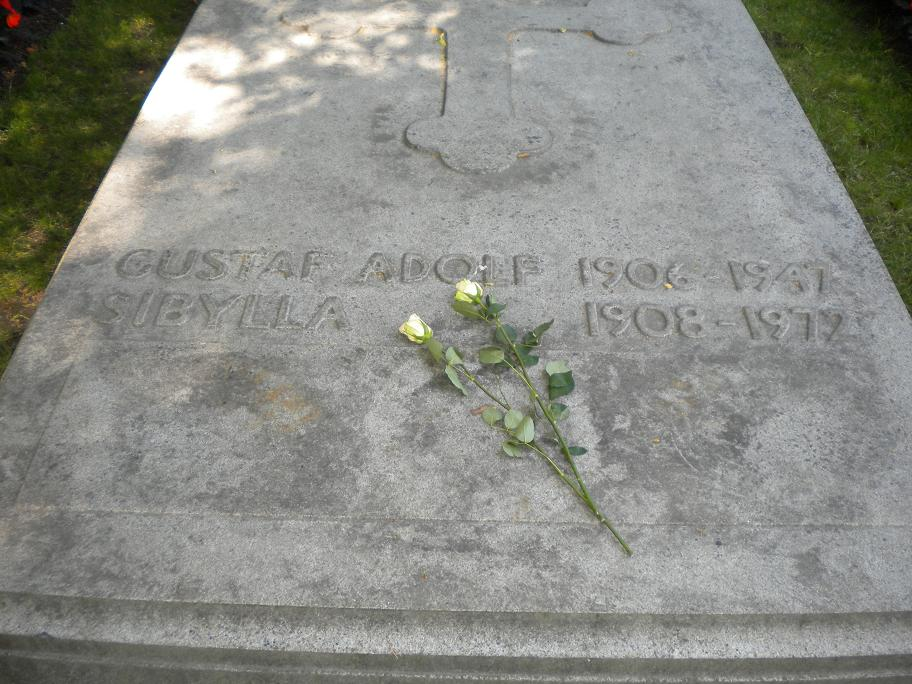
Close-up of the grave of Prince Gustaf Adolf and Princess Sibylla

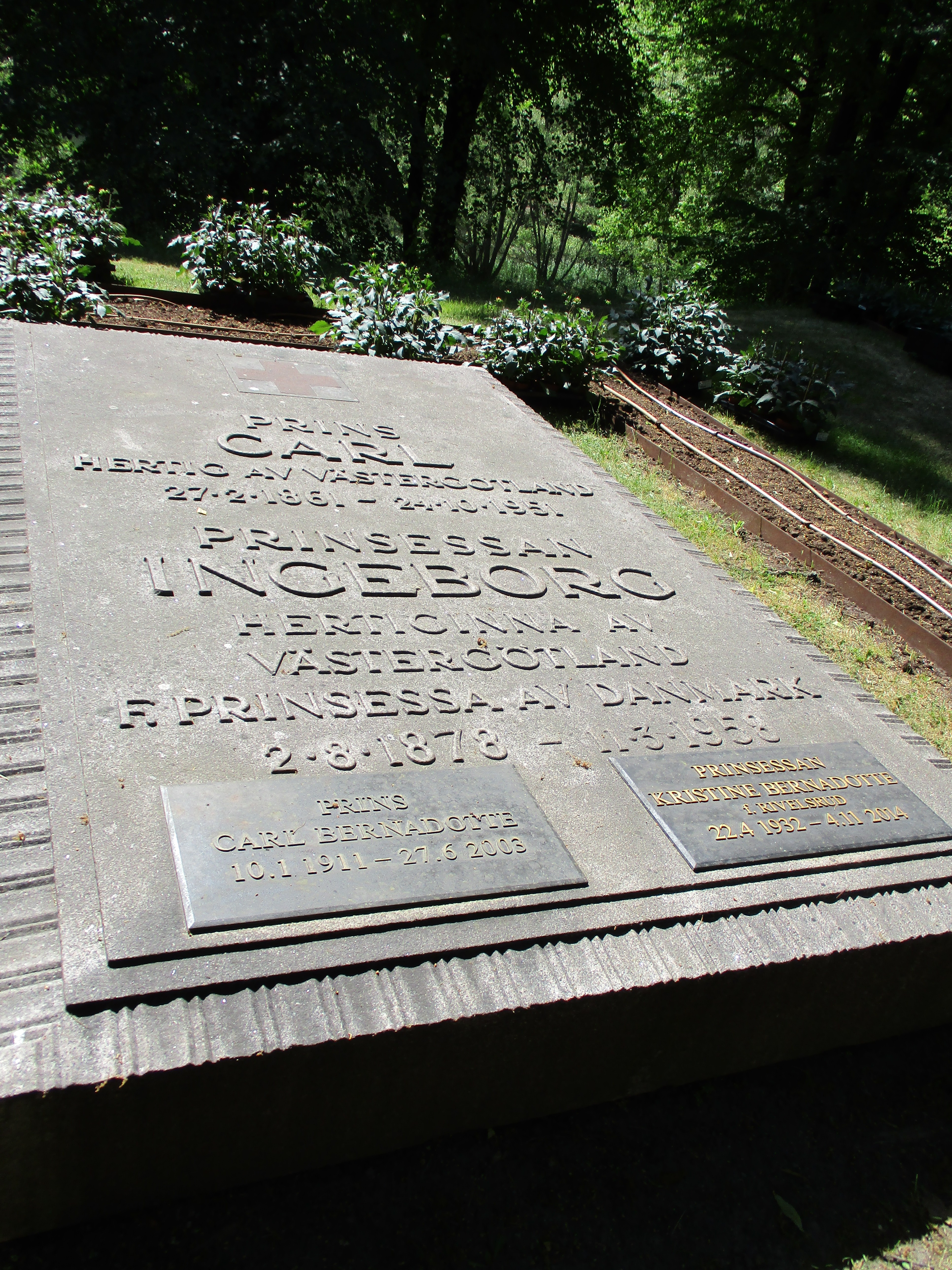
Grave of Prince Carl and Princess Ingeborg, their son Carl Bernadotte and his wife Kristine Bernadotte

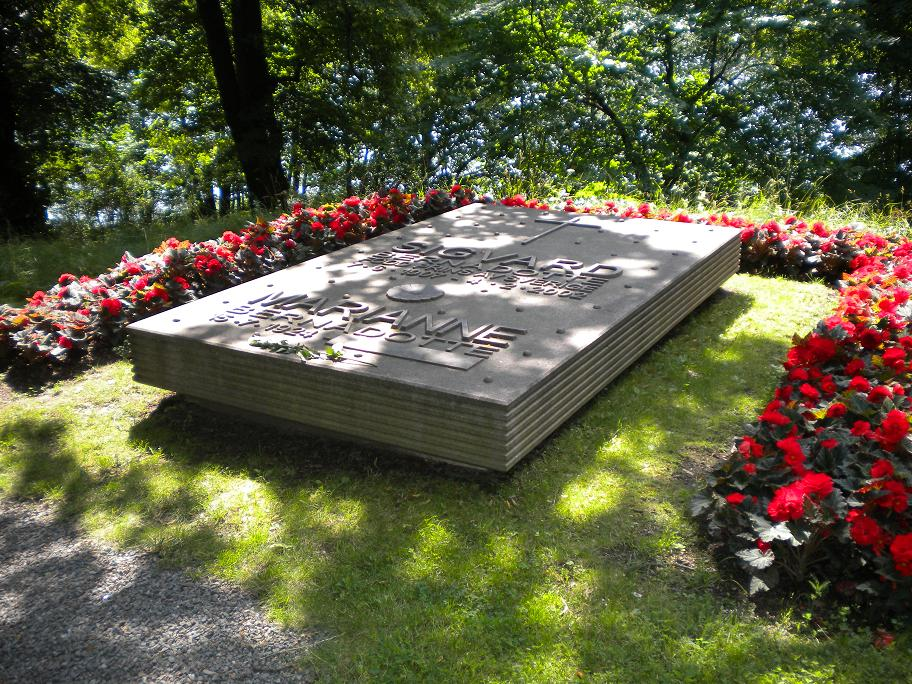
Grave of Sigvard Bernadotte

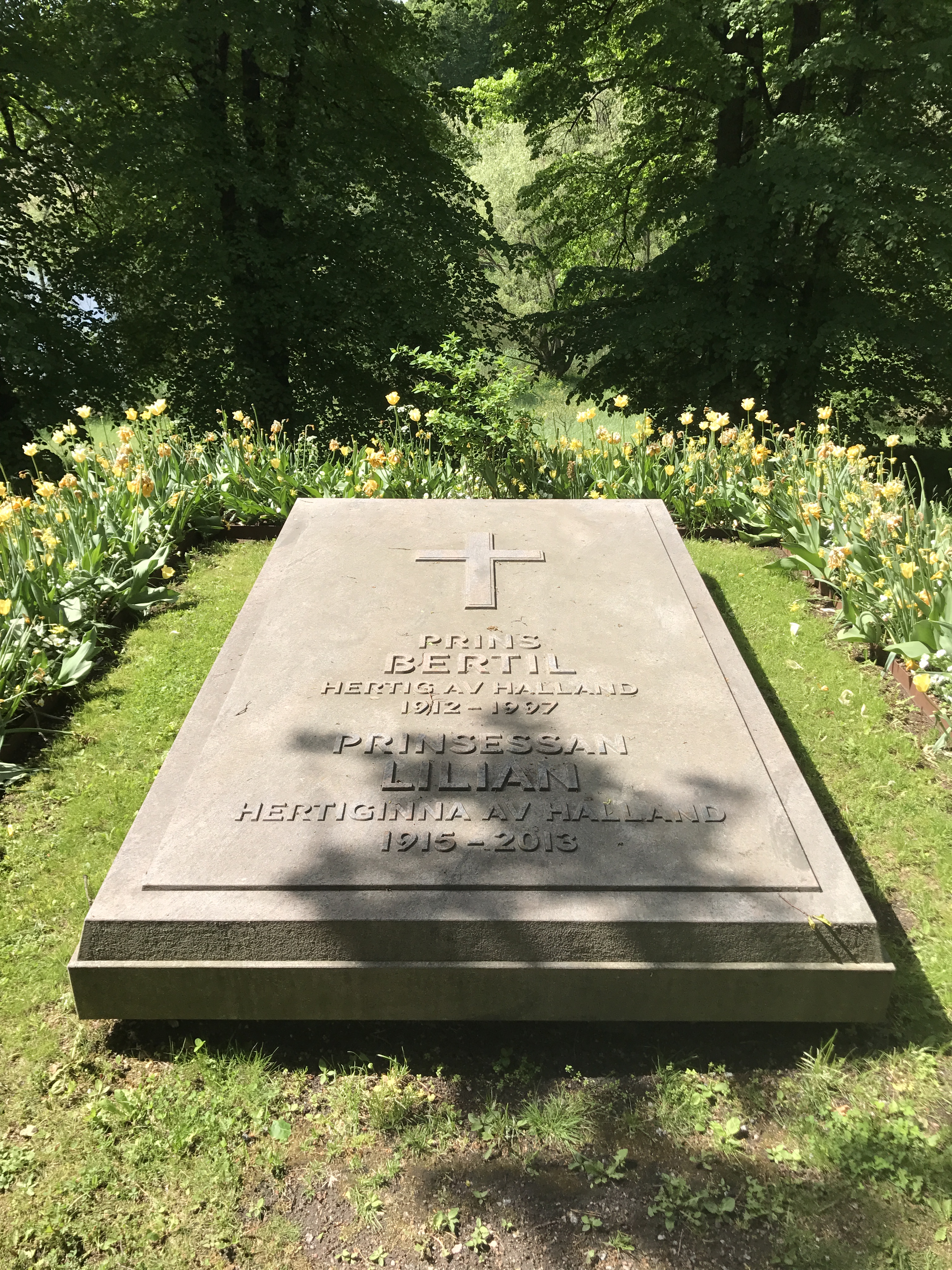
Grave of Prince Bertil and Princess Lilian

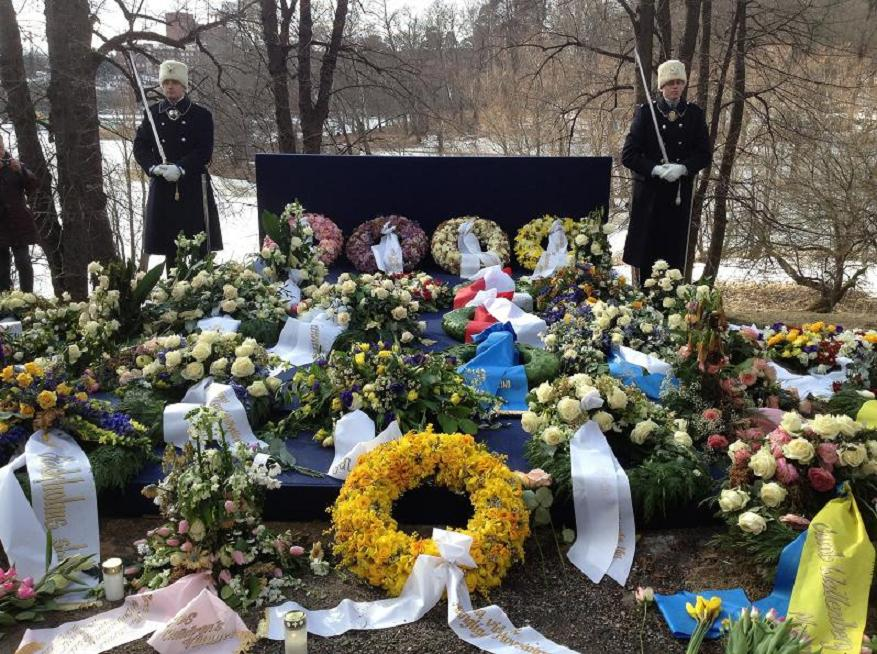
Honor guard at her grave after the 2013 funeral of Princess Lilian

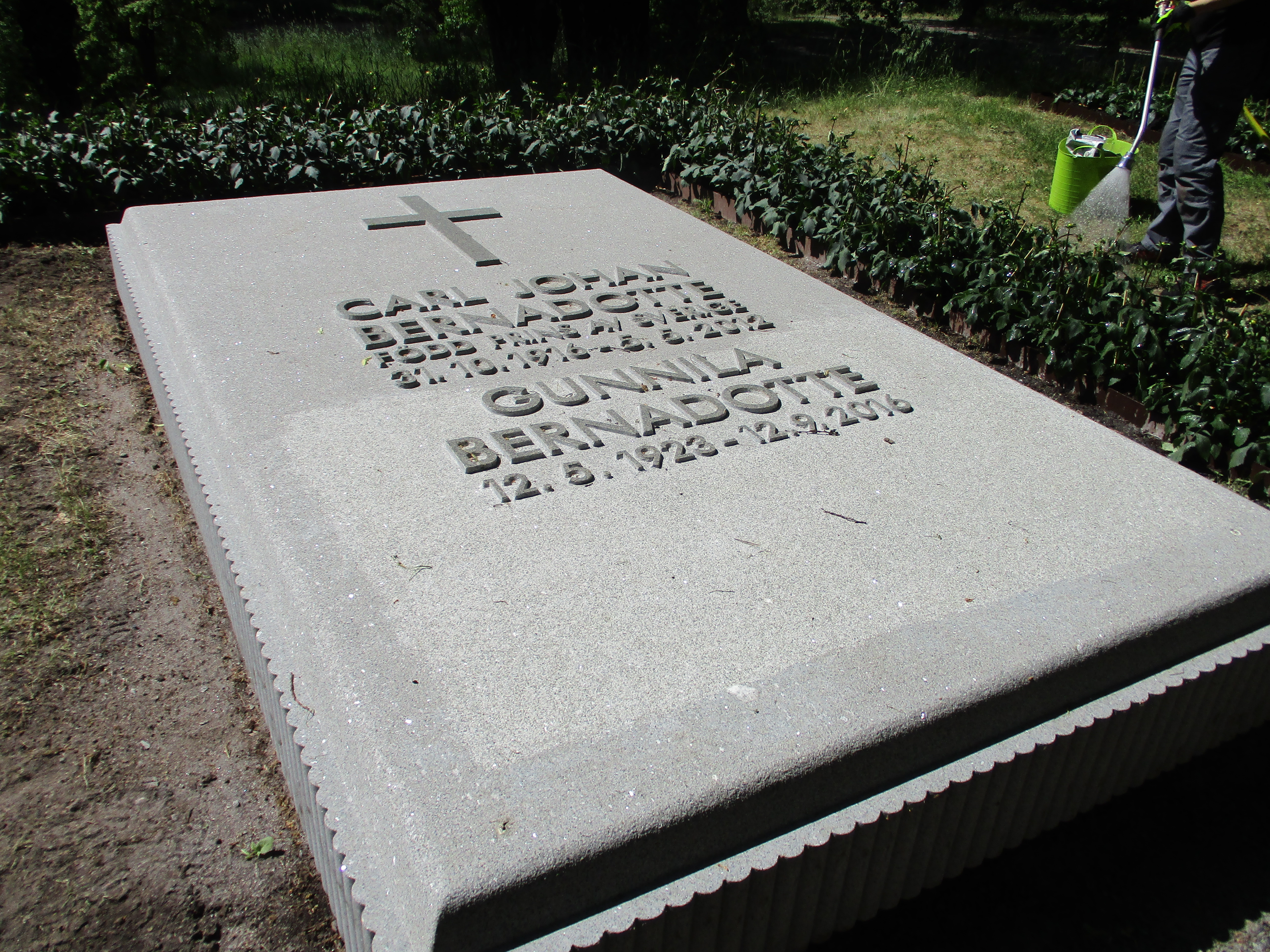
Grave of Carl Johan Bernadotte and his wife Gunnila Bernadotte

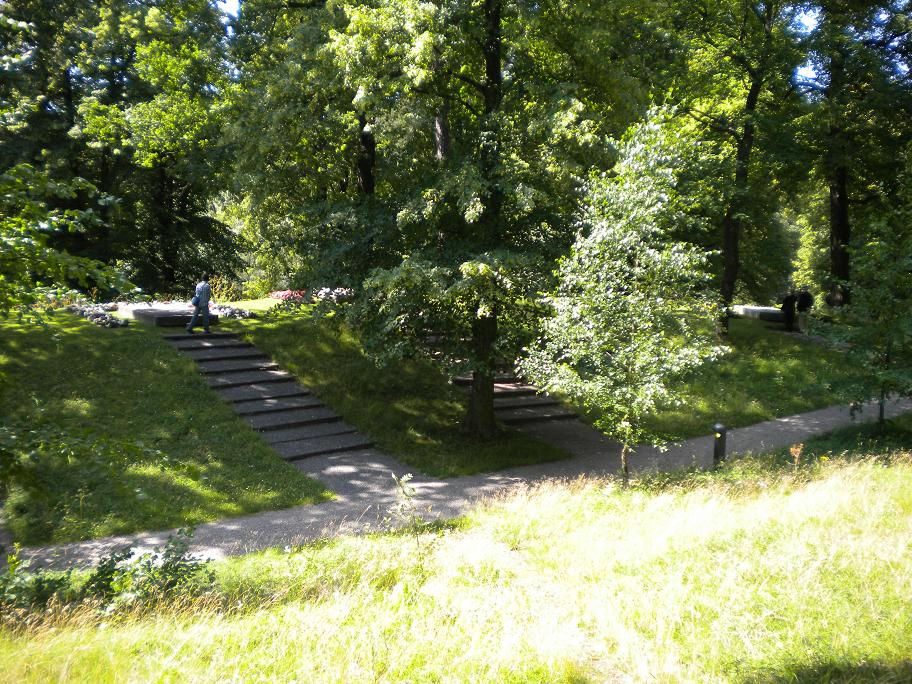
Hillside stairs and walkways in the cemetery

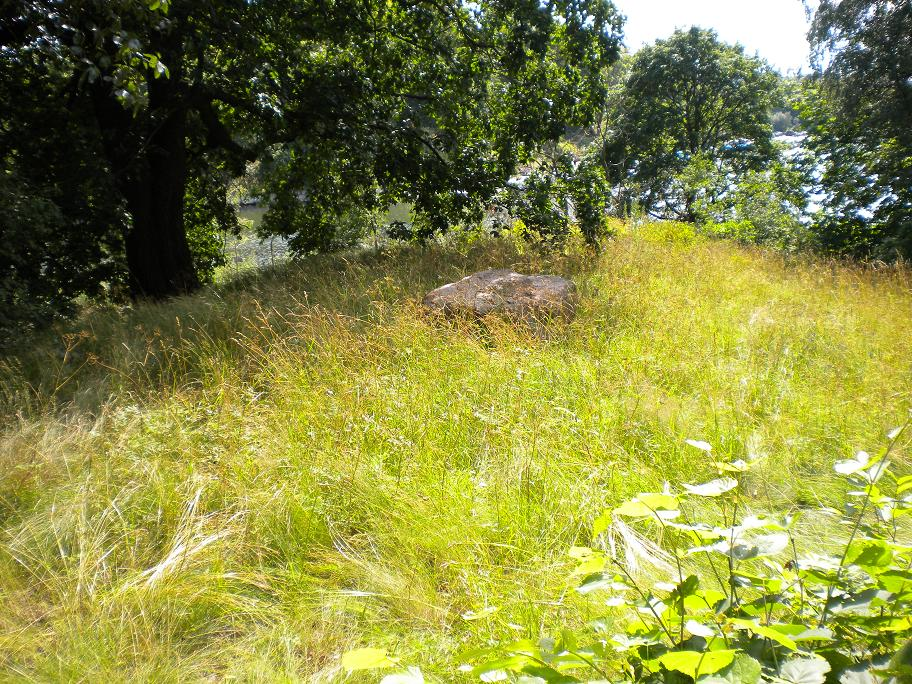
Large rock marker of significance unknown to the public
