= Sigvard Bernadotte =

Swedish prince and designer (1907–2002)

- Prince Bernadotte prev. Duke of Uppland
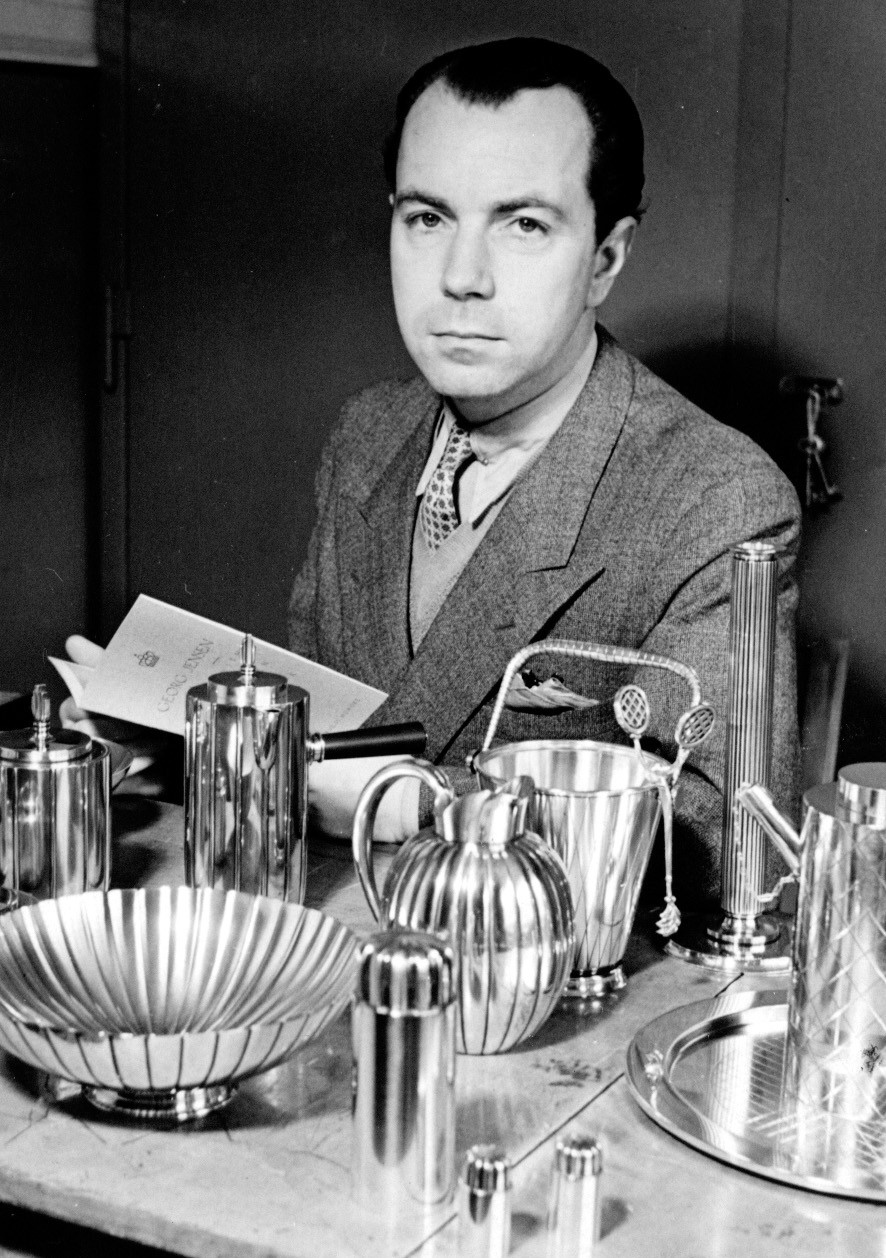
- Bernadotte in 1944
- Born: Prince Sigvard, Duke of Uppland; 7 June 1907; Stockholm Palace, Stockholm, Sweden
- Died: 4 February 2002 (aged 94); Stockholm, Sweden
- Burial: 15 February 2002; Royal Cemetery, Solna, Sweden
- Spouse: Erica Maria Patzek (m. 1934; div. 1943) Sonja Helene Robbert (m. 1943; div. 1961) Marianne Lindberg Tchang (m. 1961)
- Issue: Michael Bernadotte, Count of Wisborg
Names
- Sigvard Oscar Fredrik Bernadotte
- House: Bernadotte
- Father: Gustaf VI Adolf
- Mother: Margaret of Connaught

Sigvard Oscar Fredrik, Prince Bernadotte, Count of Wisborg (7 June 1907 – 4 February 2002) born as, and until 1934 known as, Prince Sigvard of Sweden, Duke of Uppland, was a member of the Swedish Royal Family and a successful industrial designer.

He was the second son of the future King Gustaf VI Adolf and his first wife, Princess Margaret of Connaught, eldest daughter of Prince Arthur, Duke of Connaught and Strathearn and granddaughter of Britain's Queen Victoria. He was a Prince of Sweden from birth, but was excluded from the line of succession in 1934 when he married a woman of unequal rank, a violation of provisions prohibiting marriages between a Prince and a "private man's daughter" (Swedish: enskild mans dotter), in force at the time, contained in both the 1809 Instrument of Government and the 1810 Act of Succession, and, in addition, he lost his princely and ducal titles as decided by the King in Council. As per the king's wishes, he was then to be called only Mr. Sigvard Bernadotte in Sweden. In 1951, he was granted Luxembourgian titles of nobility, the interpretation of which remained a point of contention with the Royal Court for the rest of his life, Bernadotte having formally declared in 1983 that his title was Prince Sigvard Bernadotte.

Bernadotte was a paternal uncle of King Carl XVI Gustaf of Sweden and a maternal uncle of Queen Margrethe II of Denmark.

== Early life ==
Bernadotte was born at 7 June 1907 on Drottningholm Palace in Stockholm as the second child of Crown Prince Gustaf Adolf of Sweden and Princess Margaret of Connaught. He graduated from Lundsbergs School in 1926 and went on to study political science and art history at Uppsala University. Upon graduating in 1929, he became the first member of the House of Bernadotte to earn an academic degree. In 1930, he was admitted to the design school Konstfack.

During World War II, Bernadotte served as Lieutenant in the Svea Life Guards.

== Professional life ==
After World War II, Bernadotte became creative director of Georg Jensen A/S. His original art deco "Bernadotte" collection was designed in 1938 and remains a stable in the company's product range to this day. He continued his collaboration with Georg Jensen until 1980.

In 1950, he and Danish architect and designer Acton Bjørn founded the design studio Bernadotte & Bjørn Industrial A/S in Copenhagen.

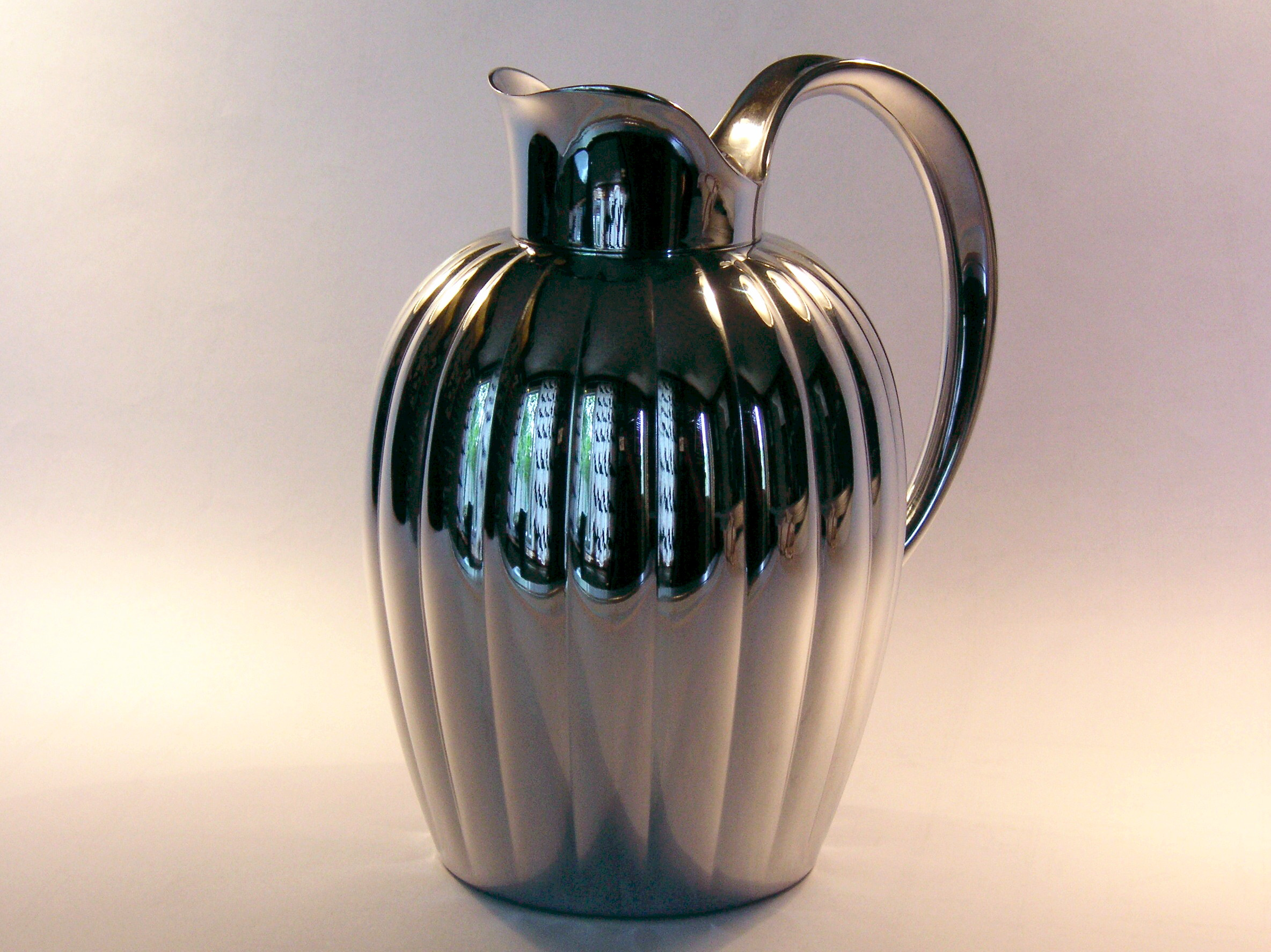
The "Bernadotte" thermo jug designed for Georg Jensen A/S, 1938.

Among his iconic designs were the Red Clara opener; EKA Swede 38 folding knife; the Margrethe bowl – named for his niece Queen Margrethe II of Denmark; the Bernadotte jug, and the Facit Private typewriter. He also designed glasses frames.

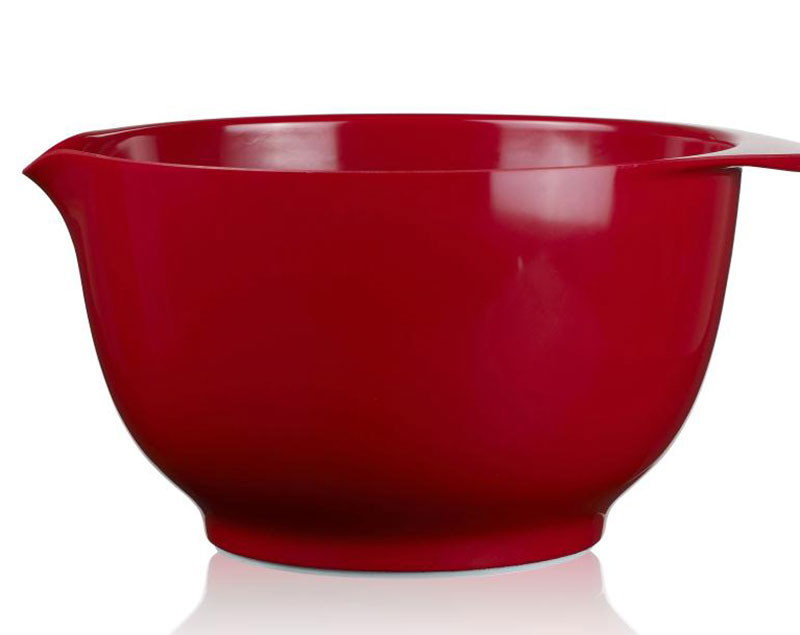
The cooking bowl "Margrethe" designed by Bernadotte & Bjørn Industridesign A/S for Rosti, 1954.

In 1964, Bernadotte opened his own studio Bernadotte Design AB in Stockholm.

He worked as an assistant director at MGM in Culver City, California and served as a technical advisor on the 1937 film The Prisoner of Zenda.

He appeared briefly in the 1968 Italian mondo film Sweden: Heaven and Hell. His work in industrial design at Bernadotte Design AB is featured, along with select items from his portfolio.

== Title ==
Bernadotte was born Prince of Sweden and Duke of Uppland, but having made an unequal match was disqualified from the line of succession. He was also forbidden to use his birth titles and left to be called Mr. Bernadotte. His cousin Lennart Bernadotte, who two years earlier had experienced the same thing (as the first Swede in history), considered himself, and even more so Sigvard, subjected to very cruel treatment for several decades by the Royal Court of Sweden due to their marriages.

On 2 July 1951, for himself, his wife and his marital descendants, Bernadotte was admitted by Grand Duchess Charlotte (head of state at the time) into the nobility of Luxembourg with the title Count of Wisborg and in that conferral was also called Sigvard Oscar Frederik Prince Bernadotte.

After more than 30 years of argument and controversy in Sweden over his rank and titles, problems which worsened when his father died in 1973, and fed up after having been demonstratively snubbed by the Royal Court of Sweden during a state visit by Queen Elizabeth II in 1983, Bernadotte announced to Tidningarnas Telegrambyrå on 28 May of that year that he was to be known as Prince Sigvard Bernadotte from then on.

Over the years since then, based on precedent established in 1888 for his great-uncle Oscar, and citing Oscar's title of nobility as it was confirmed by the Government of Luxembourg in 1892, Bernadotte was supported by several legal experts when he petitioned for acknowledgement in Sweden of the Prince Bernadotte title as his also, although he did not seek reinstatement in the line of succession to the throne as a royal prince of that country. King Carl XVI Gustaf has been criticized for never obliging and for his consequent estrangement from his uncle.

Bernadotte went to the European Court of Human Rights in an effort to have the Government of Sweden acknowledge his princely title there, but in 2004, after his death, the ECHR declared the application inadmissible.

== Marriages ==
He married Erica Maria Regina Rosalie Patzek (1911–2007) on 8 March 1934. She was the daughter of German businessman Anton Patzek and his wife Maria Anna Lála. The wedding took place in Caxton Hall in London and the witnesses were the bride's brother Georg Patzek and a lawyer Mr Gordon. Sigvard lost all royal privileges following the wedding and started his silver design business. They were divorced on 14 October 1943.

Bernadotte remarried a Danish woman, Sonja Helene Robbert (1909–2004), on 26 October 1943 and they were divorced on 6 June 1961. They had one son: Michael (born 21 August 1944).

Lastly, Bernadotte married Swedish actress Marianne Lindberg Tchang on 30 July 1961.

From 1994 to 2002, he was the oldest living great-grandchild of Queen Victoria of the United Kingdom, and having reached the age of 94, he was her longest-lived male descendant until being overtaken by his younger brother Carl Johan on 29 June 2011.

== Death ==
Bernadotte died on 4 February 2002 at the nursing home Borgarhemmet in Stockholm. His funeral took place on 15 February 2002 in Engelbrekt Church and was attended by members of both the Swedish and the Danish royal families. He is buried at Royal Cemetery in Hagaparken and the wording on his gravestone, does make it clear that he was "born Prince of Sweden".

== Honours and arms ==
=== Orders and decorations ===
==== National ====
- (Sweden) Commander Grand Cross of the Order of the Polar Star (21 March 1952)
- (Sweden) King Gustaf V's Jubilee Commemorative Medal (25 May 1928)
- (Sweden) King Gustaf V's Jubilee Commemorative Medal II (21 May 1948)
- (Sweden) Prince Eugen Medal (11 November 1997)

==== Foreign ====
- (Denmark) Knight of the Order of the Elephant (28 March 1952)

=== Arms ===
Sigvard's arms as Prince of Sweden and Duke of Uppland

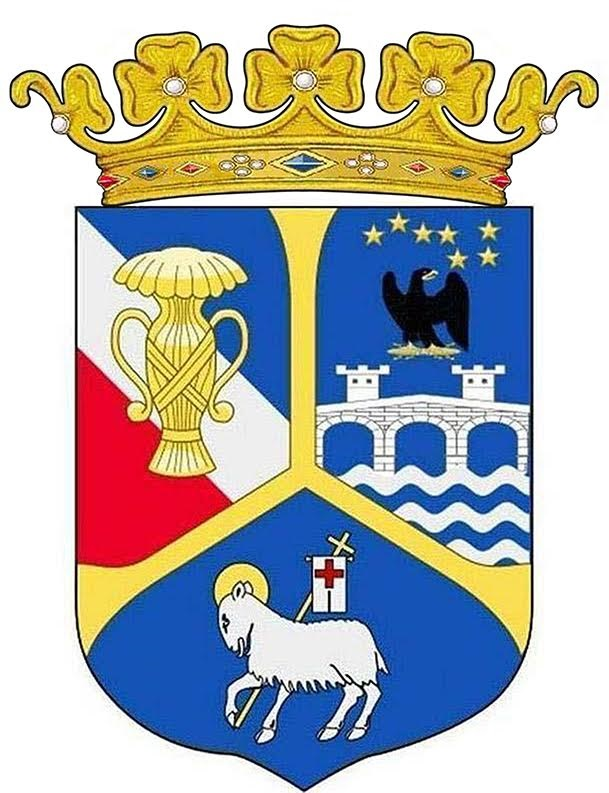
Arms as described by the Government of Luxembourg for Princes and Princesses Bernadotte in 1951

Arms of the Counts of Wisborg

== Ancestry ==
Ancestors of Sigvard Bernadotte

8. Oscar II of Sweden
4. Gustaf V of Sweden
9. Princess Sophia of Nassau
2. Gustaf VI Adolf of Sweden
10. Frederick I, Grand Duke of Baden
5. Princess Victoria of Baden
11. Princess Louise of Prussia
1. Prince Sigvard Bernadotte, Count of Wisborg
12. Prince Albert of Saxe-Coburg and Gotha
6. Prince Arthur, Duke of Connaught and Strathearn
13. Victoria of the United Kingdom
3. Princess Margaret of Connaught
14. Prince Frederick Charles of Prussia
7. Princess Louise Margaret of Prussia
15. Princess Maria Anna of Anhalt-Dessau

== See also ==
- Swedish Act of Succession
- Instrument of Government (1809)

Sigvard Bernadotte House of Bernadotte Born: 7 June 1907 Died: 4 February 2002
Swedish royalty
Preceded by Prince Gustaf	Duke of Uppland	Succeeded by none
