= Duke of Uppland =

Title from the Kingdom of Sweden

Duke of Uppland is a substantive title from the Kingdom of Sweden given by a king to a son or grandson. In earlier centuries duchies in Sweden conferred a ruling position to their prince-duke, sometimes nearly on par with the power held by the king himself; since 1772 dukedoms have been granted in title only. Uppland, meaning "Upper Lands", is one of the provinces of Sweden.

== List of dukes of Uppland ==
- Prince Waldemar (1310-1318 – also Öland)
  - Ingeborg Eriksdottir of Norway, his wife (1312-1318 – also Öland)
- Prince Gustav (1827–1852)
- Prince Sigvard (1907-1934 only as per royal court)
