= Carl Johan Bernadotte =

- Prince Bernadotte prev. Duke of Dalarna
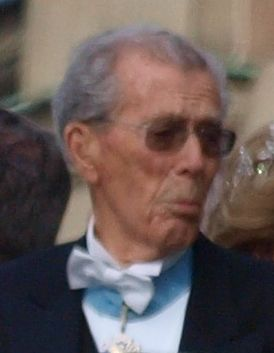
- Bernadotte at Crown Princess Victoria's wedding in 2010
- Born: 31 October 1916; Stockholm Palace, Stockholm, Sweden
- Died: 5 May 2012 (aged 95); Ängelholm, Sweden
- Burial: 14 May 2012; Royal Cemetery, Solna, Sweden
- Spouse: Kerstin Wijkmark (m. 1946; died 1987) Gunnila Wachtmeister af Johannishus (m. 1988)
- Issue: Monica Bernadotte; Christian Bernadotte
Names
- Carl Johan Arthur
- House: Bernadotte
- Father: Gustaf VI Adolf of Sweden
- Mother: Margaret of Connaught

Carl Johan Arthur, Prince Bernadotte, Count of Wisborg, KmstkNO (31 October 1916 – 5 May 2012) was the fourth son and fifth and youngest child of King Gustaf VI Adolf of Sweden and his first wife, Princess Margaret of Connaught.

Bernadotte was born a Prince of Sweden and granted the title of Duke of Dalarna but renounced these titles to marry a commoner. He was the uncle of two reigning monarchs, Margrethe II of Denmark and Carl XVI Gustaf of Sweden, as well as one queen consort, Queen Anne-Marie of Greece. He was also the last surviving great-grandchild of Queen Victoria and her husband, Prince Albert.

== Early life ==
Bernadotte was born on 31 October 1916 on Stockholm Palace as the youngest surviving child of Crown Prince Gustaf Adolf of Sweden and Princess Margaret of Connaught. He graduated from Lundsbergs School in 1935 and enlisted in the Swedish army where he achieved the rank of Captain before leaving the service in 1948.

Near the end of World War II, Bernadotte was allegedly considered for the Hungarian throne although nothing came of it.

== Marriages and children ==
Bernadotte lost his succession rights to the Swedish throne and renounced his titles in 1946 when he married the journalist Elin Kerstin Margaretha Wijkmark (4 October 1910 – 11 September 1987), daughter of Henning Wijkmark and wife Elin Larsson, in New York City on 19 February. As his unconstitutional marriage to Wijkmark — enskild mans dotter ('daughter of a common man') — could not be approved by the Swedish government, Bernadotte knew he was giving up his Swedish titles and succession rights.

They adopted two children:

- Monica Kristina Margaretha Bernadotte (born 5 March 1948, adopted in 1951), who married Count Johan Peder Bonde af Björnö (born 5 May 1950) on 16 January 1976. They had three children and were divorced in 1997.
- Christian Carl Henning Bernadotte (born 3 December 1949, adopted in 1950), who married Marianne Jenny (born 31 January 1958, daughter of Jacques Jenny and Caroline Yvonne Venter) on 13 September 1980. They have three children.

The Bernadottes lived for some time in New York City, where he worked as the representative of the Anglo-Nordic Trading Company. They made friends with the film star Greta Garbo, who stayed with them in their Swedish home near Båstad.

On 29 September 1988, the widowed Bernadotte married his childhood friend, the Swedish noblewoman Countess Gunnila Märtha Louise Wachtmeister of Johannishus (12 May 1923 – 12 September 2016), in the Swedish Gustaf's Church in Copenhagen, Denmark. After the ceremony, his sister, Queen Ingrid, hosted a wedding banquet for the couple at Fredensborg Palace. Upon marrying Wachtmeister, Bernadotte became the stepfather of her two surviving children from her previous marriage.

Bernadotte was a regular guest at Danish and Swedish royal engagements up until his death. In 2009, he and his wife were among the guests at Count Henrik of Monpezat's christening at Møgeltønder Church. It was since speculated that the grandson of his niece, Queen Margrethe II, received the name Carl in his honour.

== Death ==
Carl Johan Bernadotte died on 5 May 2012 at Ängelholm Hospital in Skåne. His funeral took place at Båstad Church on 14 May 2012 and was attended among others by the Swedish royal family as well as his nieces, Queen Margrethe II of Denmark, Princess Benedikte of Denmark and Queen Anne-Marie of Greece. On 15 May, a service of thanksgiving was held at the Royal Chapel of Stockholm Palace, after which Bernadotte was buried at Royal Cemetery in Hagaparken.

== Titles, styles, honours and arms ==
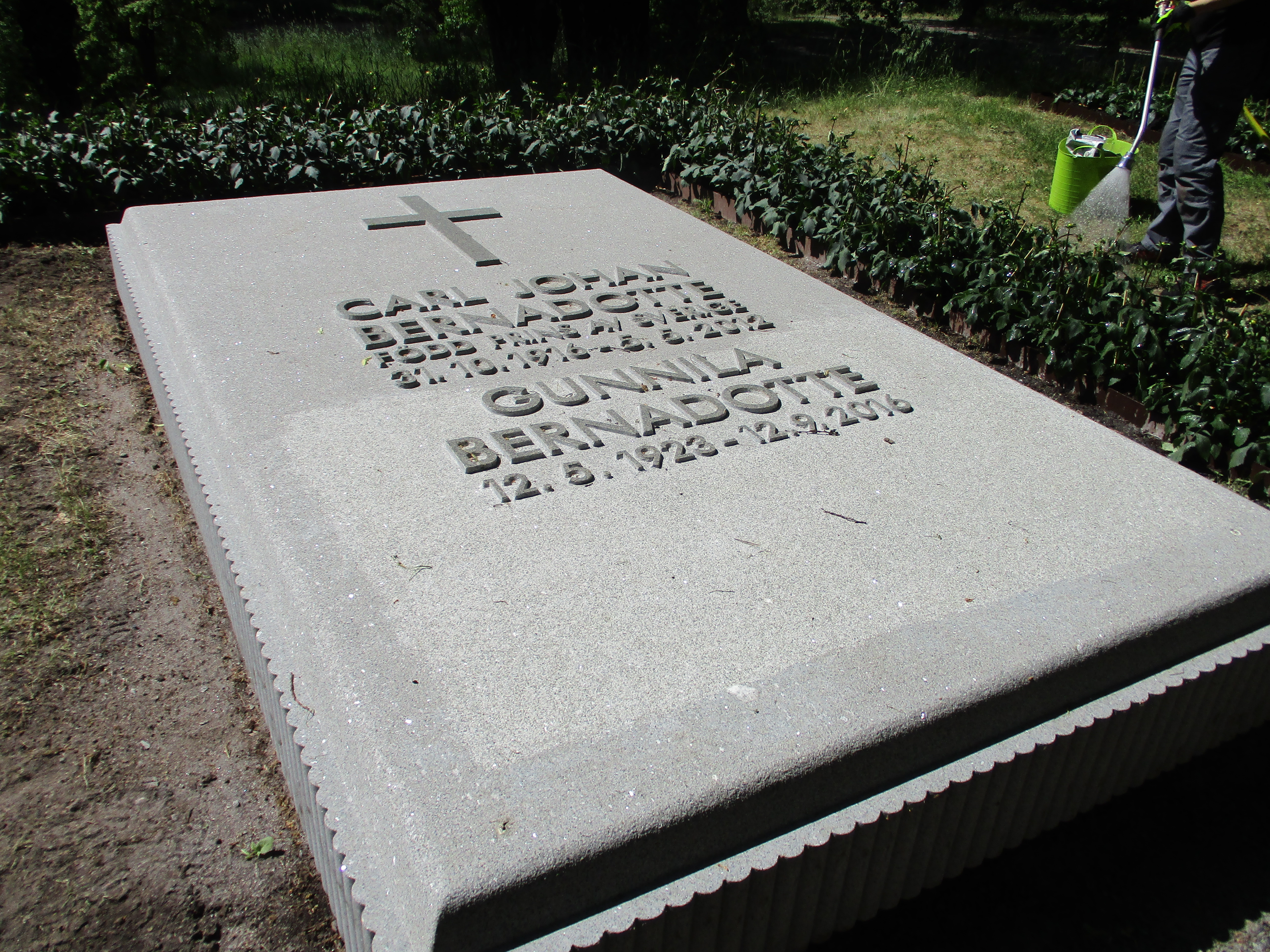
Bernadotte's grave at the Royal Cemetery north of Stockholm.

- 31 October 1916 – 19 February 1946: His Royal Highness Prince Carl Johan of Sweden, Duke of Dalarna
- 19 February 1946 – 2 July 1951: Carl Johan Bernadotte
- 2 July 1951 – 5 May 2012: Carl Johan Arthur, Prince Bernadotte, Count of Wisborg

When marrying on 19 February 1946 he lost his Swedish royal titles, i.e. Prince of Sweden and Duke of Dalarna. He subsequently assumed the surname Bernadotte, the name of the Swedish Royal Family.

On 2 July 1951, for himself, his wife and his marital descendants, he was admitted by Grand Duchess Charlotte (head of state at the time) into the Luxembourgois nobility with the title Count of Wisborg and in that conferral was also made Carl Johan Arthur Prince Bernadotte.

=== Honours ===
Certain Swedish decorations were awarded at birth in 1916 and renounced in 1946.

==== National honours ====
- Sweden: Knight with Collar of the Royal Order of the Seraphim – Revoked
- Sweden: Commander Grand Cross with Collar of the Royal Order of the Sword – Revoked
- Sweden: Commander Grand Cross with Collar of the Royal Order of the Polar Star – Revoked and Reconferred (10 April 1952)
- Sweden: Knight of the Royal Order of Charles XIII – Revoked
- Sweden: King Gustaf V's Jubilee Commemorative Medal (1928)
- Sweden: King Gustaf VI Adolf's Commemorative Medal (1967)
- Sweden: King Carl XVI Gustaf's Jubilee Commemorative Medal (1996)

==== Foreign honours ====
- Denmark: Knight Grand Cross of the Order of the Elephant
- Guatemala: Grand Officer of the Order of the Quetzal

=== Arms ===
Carl Johan's arms as Prince of Sweden and Duke of Dalecarlia

Arms of the Counts of Wisborg

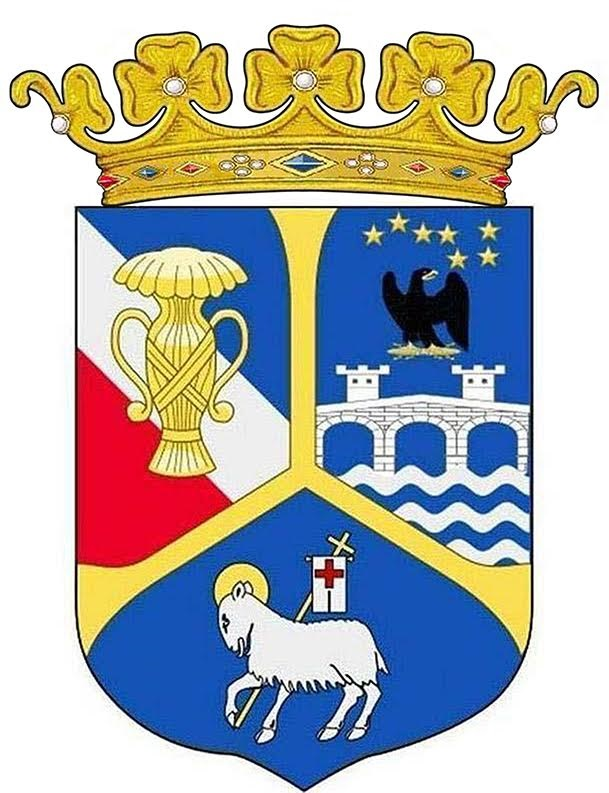
Arms as described by the Government of Luxembourg for Princes and Princesses Bernadotte in 1951

== Ancestry ==
On 29 June 2011, he surpassed his elder brother, Sigvard (1907–2002), as the longest-lived of Queen Victoria's male descendants, a record he would hold until being surpassed by Prince Philip, Duke of Edinburgh on 13 December 2016. He was the last surviving great-grandchild of Queen Victoria of the United Kingdom, the last surviving child of Gustaf VI Adolf, and the last surviving grandchild of Gustaf V.

Ancestors of Carl Johan Bernadotte

8. Oscar II of Sweden
4. Gustaf V of Sweden
9. Princess Sophia of Nassau
2. Gustaf VI Adolf of Sweden
10. Frederick I, Grand Duke of Baden
5. Princess Victoria of Baden
11. Princess Louise of Prussia
1. Prince Carl Johan, Duke of Dalarna
12. Prince Albert of Saxe-Coburg and Gotha
6. Prince Arthur, Duke of Connaught and Strathearn
13. Victoria of the United Kingdom
3. Princess Margaret of Connaught
14. Prince Friedrich Karl of Prussia
7. Princess Louise Margaret of Prussia
15. Princess Maria Anna of Anhalt-Dessau

== See also ==
- Descendants of Queen Victoria

Carl Johan Bernadotte House of Bernadotte Born: 31 October 1916 Died: 5 May 2012
Swedish royalty
Preceded by Vacant, last held by Prince August, Duke of Dalarna	Duke of Dalarna; 1916–1946	Succeeded by Vacant, next held by Prince Gabriel
