= Princess Ingeborg of Denmark =

Duchess of Västergötland (1878–1958)

Princess Ingeborg
- Duchess of Västergötland
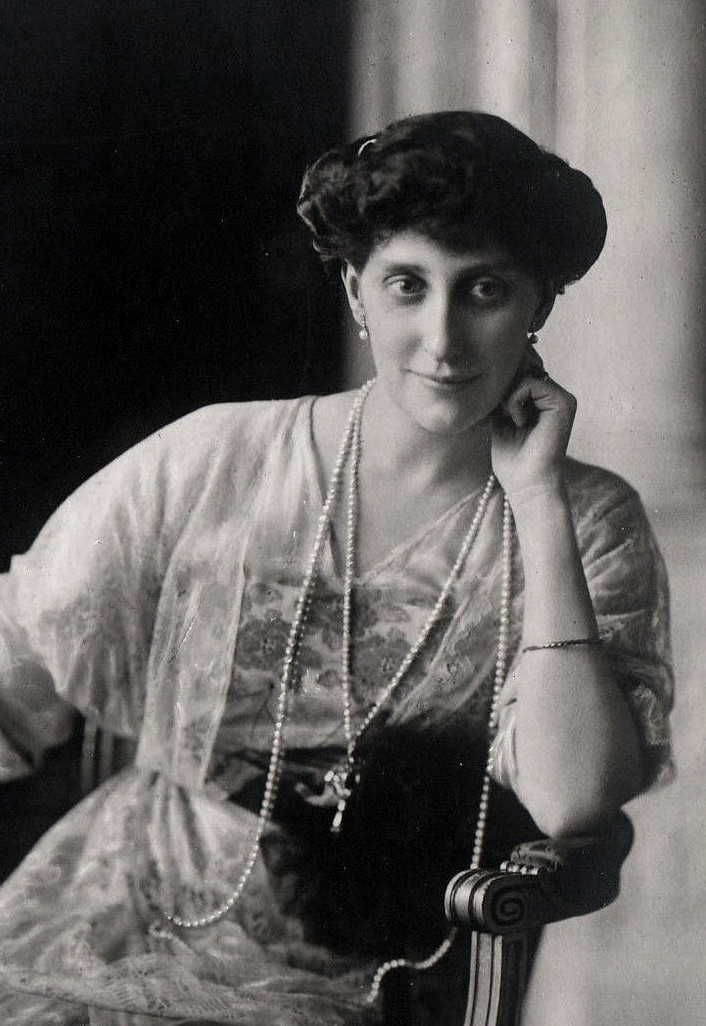
- Ingeborg in 1914
- Born: 2 August 1878; Charlottenlund Palace, Copenhagen, Denmark
- Died: 12 March 1958 (aged 79); Stockholm, Sweden
- Burial: 19 March 1958; Royal Cemetery, Solna, Sweden
- Spouse: Prince Carl, Duke of Västergötland (m. 1897; died 1951)
- Issue: Margaretha, Princess Axel of Denmark; Märtha, Crown Princess of Norway; Astrid, Queen of the Belgians; Prince Carl Bernadotte
Names
- Ingeborg Charlotte Caroline Frederikke Louise
- House: Glücksburg
- Father: Frederick VIII of Denmark
- Mother: Louise of Sweden

Princess Ingeborg of Denmark (Ingeborg Charlotte Caroline Frederikke Louise; 2 August 1878 – 12 March 1958) was a Princess of Sweden by marriage to Prince Carl, Duke of Västergötland.

Princess Ingeborg was a daughter of Frederick VIII of Denmark and Louise of Sweden, she grew up in Copenhagen as a Danish princess. In 1897, she was married to her mother's first cousin Prince Carl of Sweden, Duke of Västergötland, and spent the rest of her of life in Sweden as a member of the Swedish royal family.

Her marriage produced four children, among whom were Märtha, Crown Princess of Norway and Astrid, Queen of the Belgians.

== Early life ==
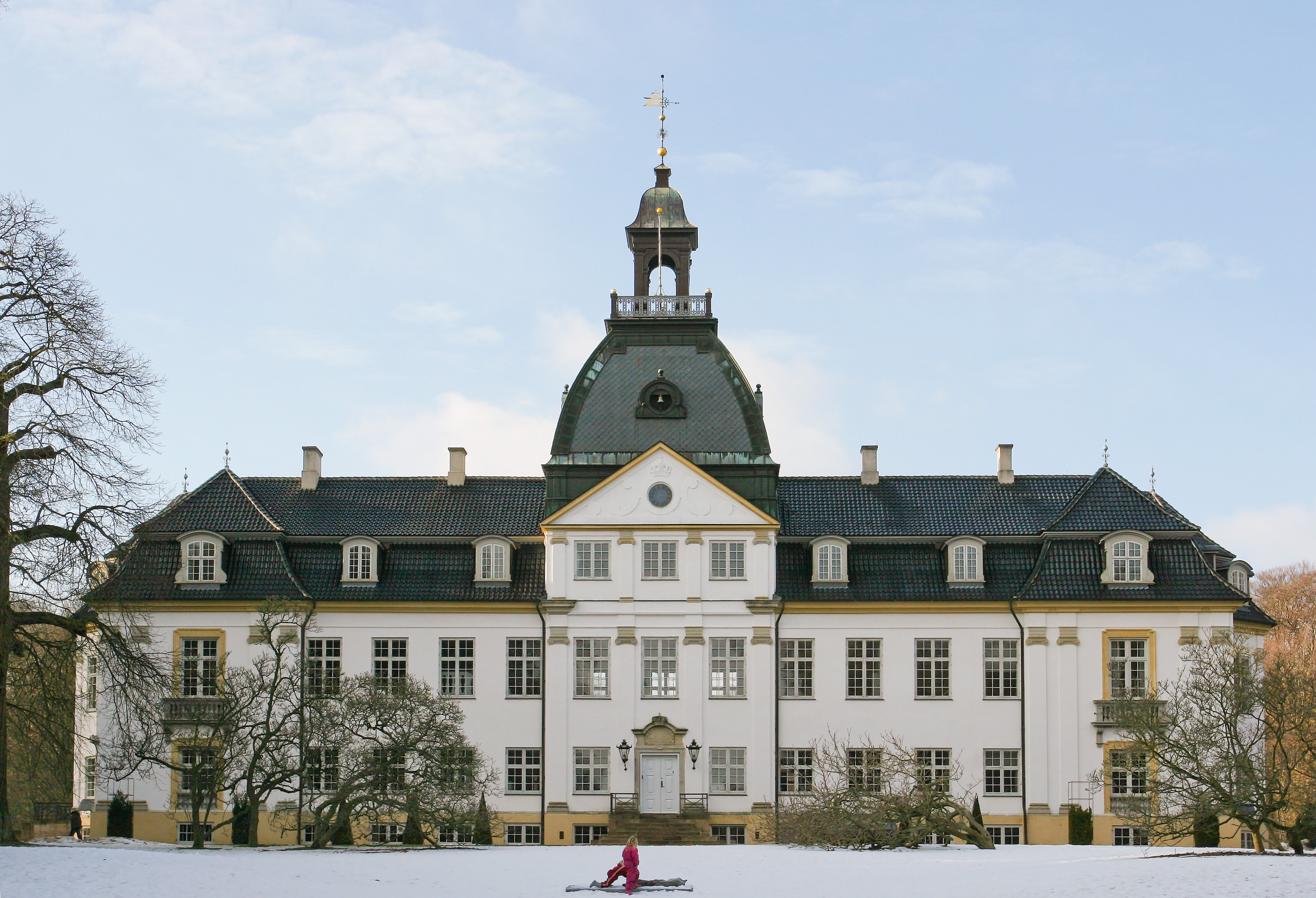
Princess Ingeborg's birthplace, Charlottenlund Palace

Princess Ingeborg was born on 2 August 1878 at her parents' country residence, the Charlottenlund Palace north of Copenhagen, during the reign of her paternal grandfather, King Christian IX. She was the second daughter and fifth child of Crown Prince Frederick of Denmark, and his wife Princess Louise of Sweden. Her father was the eldest son of King Christian IX of Denmark and Louise of Hesse-Kassel, and her mother was the only daughter of King Charles XV of Sweden and Louise of the Netherlands. She was baptised with the names Ingeborg Charlotte Caroline Frederikke Louise, (Note: Later in Swedish: Ingeborg Charlotta Carolina Fredrika Lovisa) and was known as Princess Ingeborg.

As a granddaughter of Christian IX, referred to by the sobriquet the "father-in-law of Europe", Princess Ingeborg was related to several European monarchs and rulers. She was thus a first cousin of the future King George V of the United Kingdom, Tsar Nicholas II of Russia, King Constantine I of Greece and Duke Ernest Augustus of Brunswick.

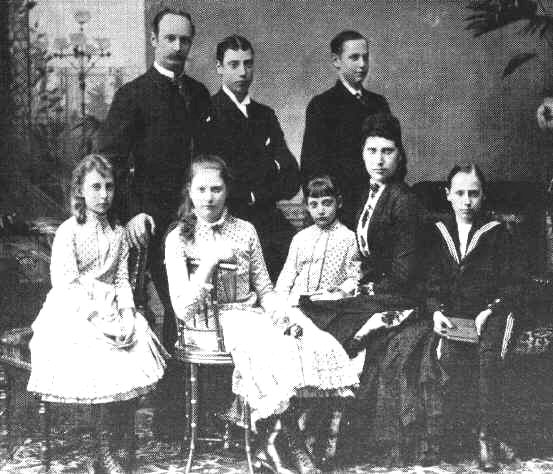
Princess Ingeborg (far left) with her parents and eldest siblings in 1885.

Princess Ingeborg had seven siblings, the two eldest of whom were Prince Christian (the future King Christian X of Denmark) and Prince Carl (the future King Haakon VII of Norway). She was raised with her siblings at the royal household in Copenhagen, and grew up between her parents' city residence, the Frederik VIII's Palace, (Note: Frederik VIII's Palace is also known as Brockdorff's Palace.) an 18th-century palace which forms part of the Amalienborg Palace complex in central Copenhagen, and their country residence, the Charlottenlund Palace, located by the coastline of the Øresund strait north of the city. In contrast to the usual practise of the period, where royal children were brought up by governesses, the children were raised by Crown Princess Louise herself. Under the supervision of their mother, the children of the Crown Princess received a rather strict Christian-dominated upbringing, which was characterized by severity, the fulfillment of duties, care and order. In spite of this austere upbringing, Princess Ingeborg grew up to be a friendly, carefree and quick-witted young woman.

== Engagement and marriage ==
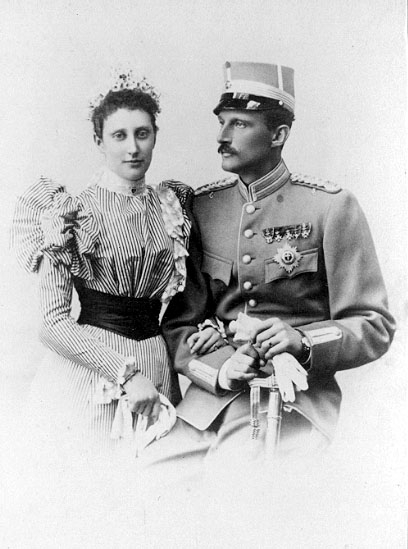
Princess Ingeborg and Prince Carl in 1897.

In May 1897, Princess Ingeborg was engaged at the age of eighteen to Prince Carl of Sweden, Duke of Västergötland who was the third son of King Oscar II of Sweden and Sophia of Nassau. They were, therefore, first cousins once-removed. It had long been a public secret that Crown Princess Louise wanted one of her daughters to marry a member of the Swedish royal family, which thus indeed happened. In 1947, on the occasion of their golden wedding anniversary, her spouse admitted that their marriage had been arranged by their respective fathers, and Ingeborg herself added: "I married a complete stranger!" Although their marriage was arranged, the outcome was very much in accordance with the personal aspiration of the princess who after the wedding said: "I have prayed to God for a whole year to have Carl."

The wedding was celebrated on 27 August 1897 in the chapel of Christiansborg Palace in Copenhagen. The wedding guests included members of the Danish and Swedish royal families, as well as the bride's paternal aunts, the Dowager Empress of Russia and the Princess of Wales. After the wedding reception, the newly married couple left the palace for the pier, where they embarked the Danish royal yacht, the paddle steamer Dannebrog, which early next morning sailed for Lübeck. They spent their honeymoon in Germany.

== Public role ==
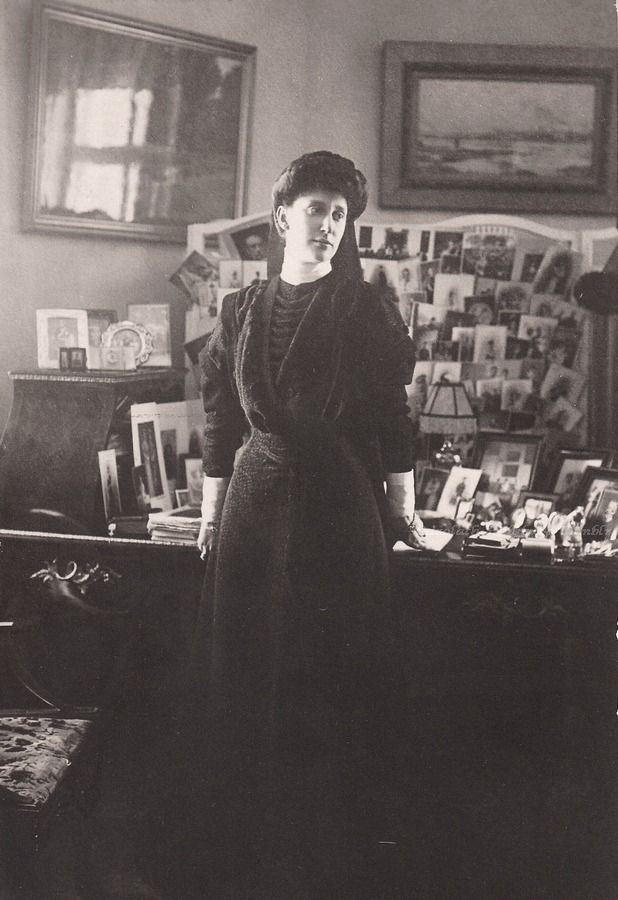
Ingeborg, Duchess of Västergötland in mourning, 1900s

Upon her arrival in Sweden, she was an immediate success. The marriage was seen positively by the public because Ingeborg was the granddaughter of the popular King Charles XV of Sweden and Norway. She also became well-liked by both her family and the Swedish public for her cheerful, humorous, and informal manner. Her father-in-law, King Oscar II called her the family's "little ray of sunshine." It was said of her, that of all foreign princesses married into the Swedish royal house, she was perhaps the one best suited to be Queen consort of Sweden, and for the first ten years in Sweden, she almost was: from 1897 until 1907, Queen Sophia seldom attended public events and Crown Princess Victoria spent most of her time abroad for health reasons, Princess Ingeborg was thereby given more public duties, unofficially performing much of the role associated with the queen consort at the Swedish court. She is perceived as having performed her representational duties with a combination of dignity and easygoing friendliness, and as attracting a social circle with her wit. Her sister-in-law, Crown Princess Victoria, however, did not approve of her informality and once remarked: "One does not enter the chamber of the Crown Princess of Sweden without knocking, even if one is Princess Ingeborg."

Ingeborg was interested in sports, especially ice skating, and at the automobile exhibition of Stockholm in 1903, she and Crown Prince Gustav, made a spontaneous demonstration trip in a car from Scania. In 1908, she accompanied her husband's nephew Prince Wilhelm to his wedding with her paternal first cousin once removed Grand Duchess Maria Pavlovna in Russia.

== Family life ==
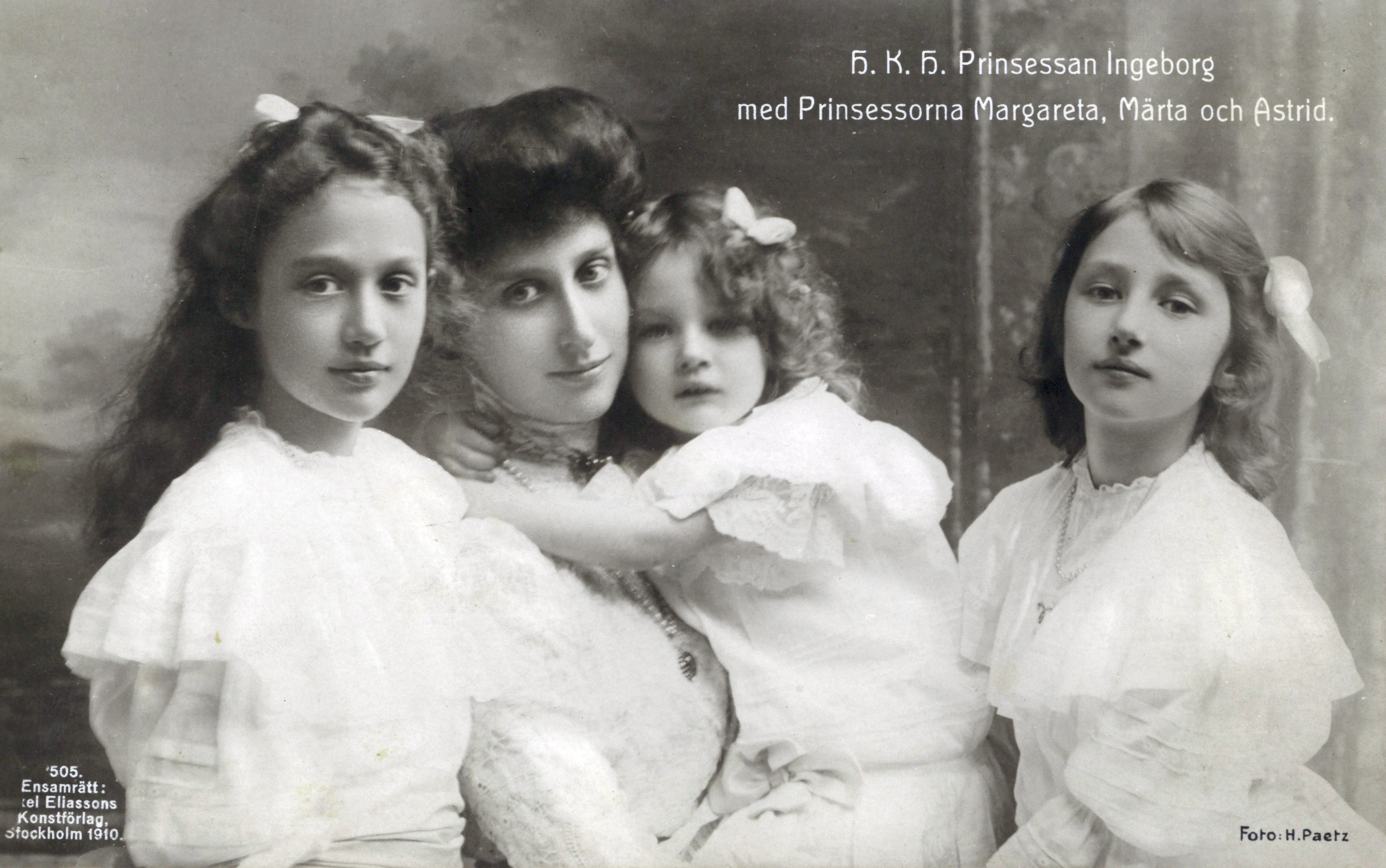
Princess Ingeborg and her daughters (1910).

Although the parties had not had much influence on its conclusion, the marriage between Ingeborg and Carl ended up being successful, and the couple's relationship was described as harmonious. They had four children:

1. Princess Margaretha of Sweden, later Princess Axel of Denmark (25 June 1899 – 4 January 1977).
2. Princess Märtha of Sweden, later Crown Princess of Norway (28 March 1901 – 5 April 1954).
3. Princess Astrid of Sweden, later Queen of the Belgians (17 November 1905 – 29 August 1935).
4. Prince Carl, Duke of Östergötland, known as Carl Jr., later Prince Bernadotte, a Belgian title (10 January 1911 – 27 June 2003).

The family lived a harmonious life, and was known as "The happy family". The children were given a simple upbringing, and expected to learn household tasks: they were, for example, given a real stove in their play cottage, on which they cooked real food. She and Carl lived an informal and intimate family life with their children.

Ingeborg was admired for her handling of the economic difficulties experienced when a bank they invested in crashed in 1922 and they had to sell their home. She was portrayed as a symbol of a wife and mother in many magazines and was for many years the most popular member of the royal house.

== Later life and death ==
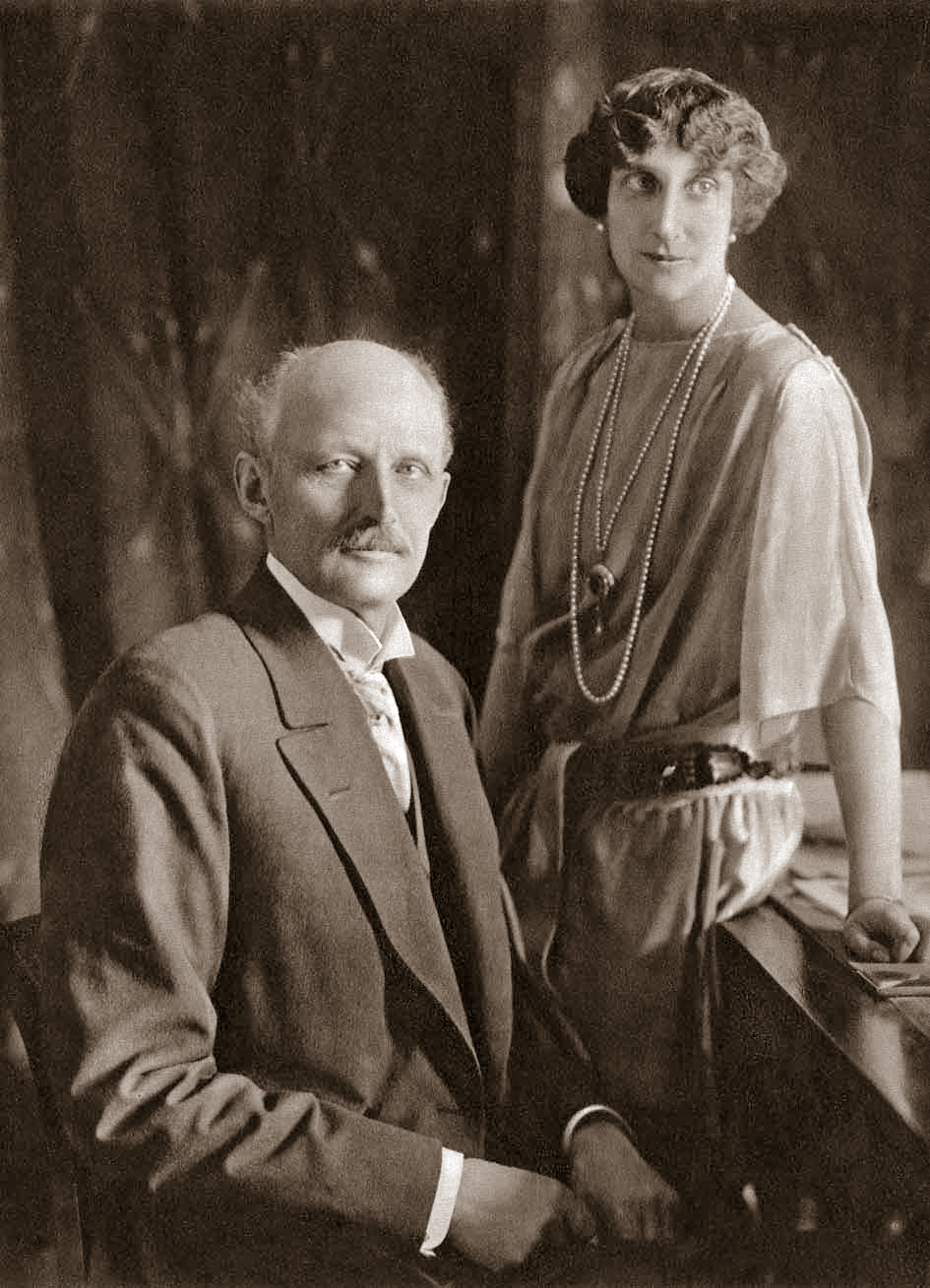
Prince Carl and Princess Ingeborg in 1926.

In 1905, the Norwegian government discussed making them king and queen of Norway, but Carl declined the offer. Instead, her brother was elected monarch of Norway. Ingeborg's kinship to the Scandinavian dynasties helped bring the three royal houses together again after tension created due to Norway's 1905 secession. Politically, Ingeborg had democratic and liberal sympathies and disliked the conservatives, views she expressed during the government crisis in 1914. She detested the conservative Hammarskjöld cabinet and the 1914 policy, criticized the conservative press and viewed the resignation of the Liberal-Social Democratic cabinet of 1914 as a disaster, reportedly commented it with the words: "It must not happen! No no no!"

During World War II from 1940 to 1945, she demonstrated publicly against Nazi Germany by blocking the window of her house which faced the German embassy in Stockholm.

Following the death of her husband in 1951, she was invited to reside in the Swedish royal palace; however, she declined, stating that she did not wish to change her 'modest mode of living.' Ingeborg lived the rest of her years quietly in her Stockholm apartment.

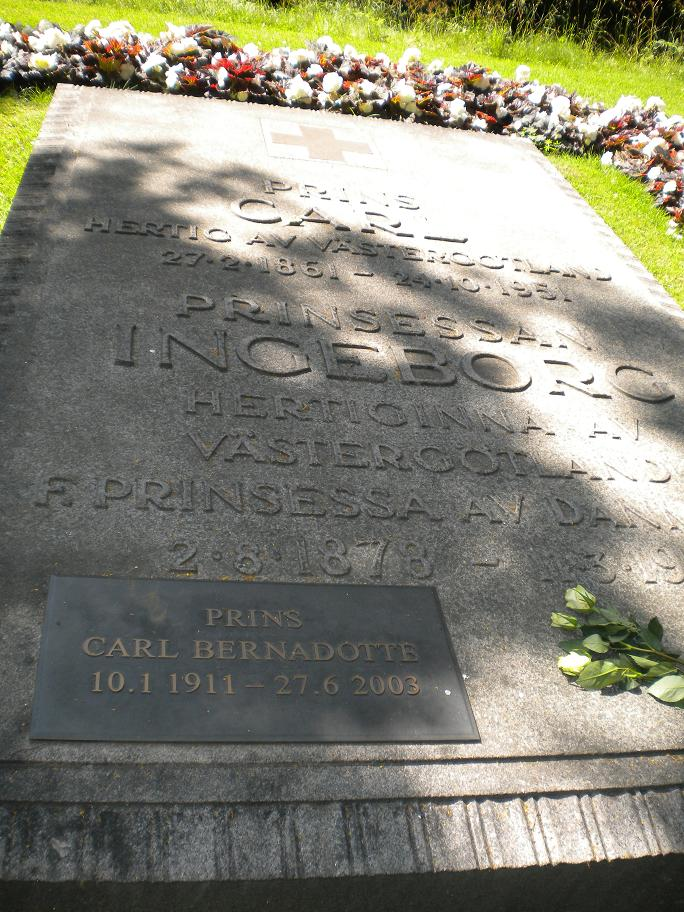
Ingeborg and Carl's grave at the Royal Cemetery

Princess Ingeborg died in her sleep on 12 March 1958 at her home, aged 79, having outlived two of her three daughters, Astrid and Märtha.

Her funeral took place on 19 March 1958 at the Stockholm Cathedral, and was attended by several European monarchs, including King Olav V of Norway, King Gustaf VI Adolf of Sweden, King Frederick IX of Denmark and King Baudouin of Belgium. Queen Louise of Sweden and Queen Ingrid of Denmark were also present.

Following the ceremony, other members of the royal families attended the interment at the Royal Cemetery, where Princess Ingeborg was buried alongside her husband. Her coffin, which had lain in state in the cathedral overnight, was draped with the flags of Sweden and Denmark and adorned with a simple bouquet of white carnations and tulips, placed by Princess Margaretha of Denmark.

== Honours ==
Coat of arms of Princess Ingeborg of Sweden

=== Foreign ===
- (Ottoman Empire) Turkish Imperial Family: Dame Grand Cordon of the Imperial Order of Charity
