= Florence Stephens =

Swedish landowner

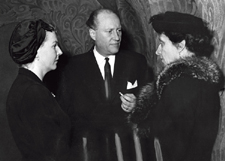
Florence Stephens (right) with Prince Carl Bernadotte and his second wife Ann during the trial in 1957

Florence Elisabet Stephens (5 October 1881 – 2 April 1979) was a wealthy Swedish landowner, known as Fröken på Huseby ("the Lady of Huseby") for her estate at Huseby. She was the main figure in the Huseby Affair (Swedish: Husebyskandalen, "Huseby scandal"), one of the most prominent court cases in Sweden during the late 1950s and early 1960s.

== Life ==
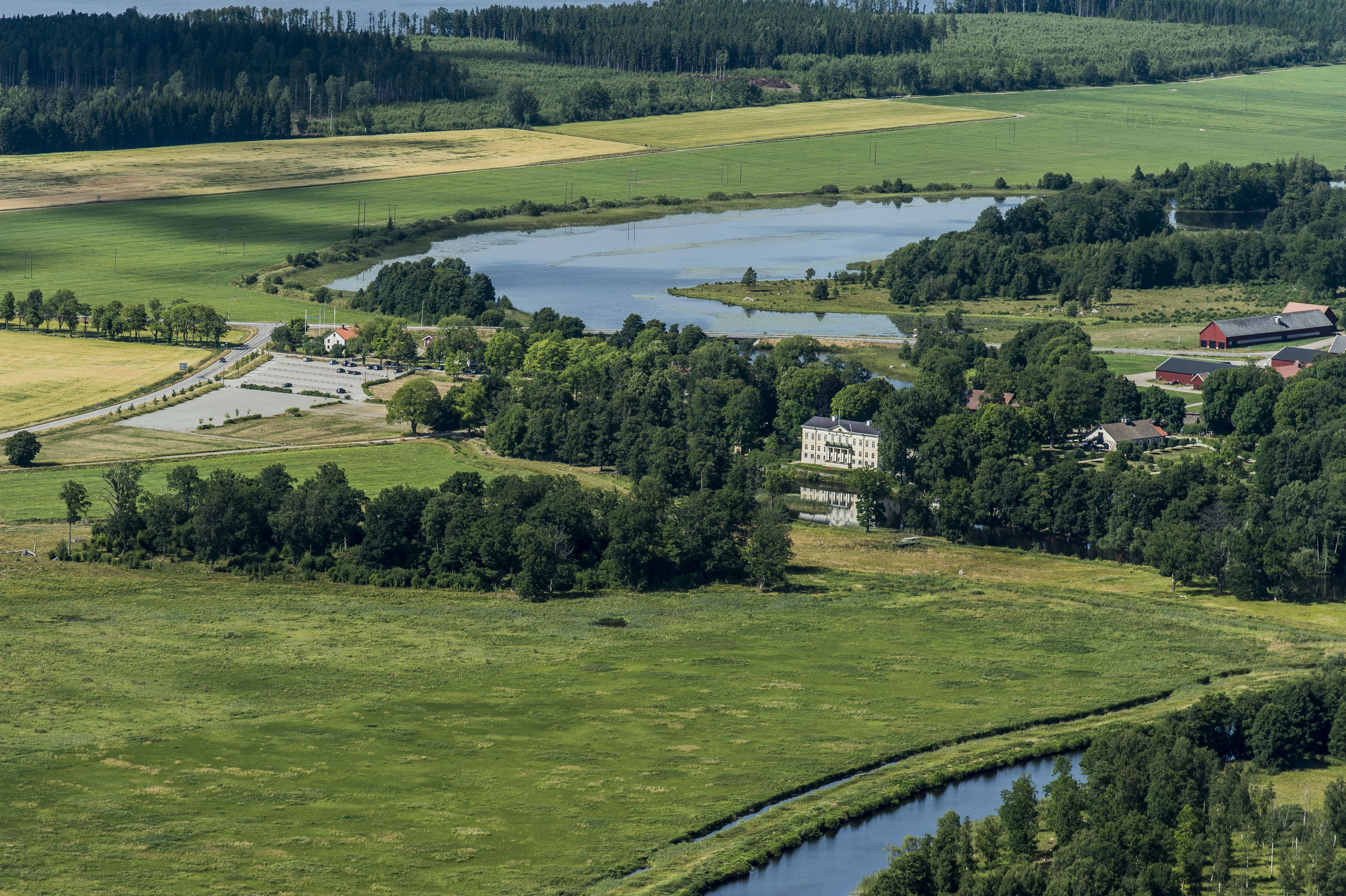
Huseby manor

Born in Skatelöv, Kronoberg County, Florence Stephens was the eldest of three daughters of the landowner and politician Joseph Stephens (1841–1934) by his marriage to Elisabeth Kreüger; her paternal grandfather, George Stephens (1813–1895), was an English academic, originally from Liverpool.

Stephens and her sisters Mary and Maggie were educated by a governess, and although she had a good education in languages and was well read, she had no formal education in management or economics. She never married; she ran the household after her mother's death in 1911 and acted as her father's assistant and representative for three decades, and in the 1920s and 1930s was also active in local politics, including a woman's association.

When her father died in 1934 and she inherited the estate at Huseby, she doubled her land holdings by acquiring additional timberland, and then in the 1940s, at times in partnership with Prince Carl Bernadotte, nephew of King Gustav V, she also expanded the estate's industry, which included an iron foundry. She financed both by cutting timber, both on the original estate and on newly acquired land. In the early 1950s, the forestry commission ordered her to stop cutting, which interrupted this source of funding. She was also averse to many modern farming methods, including chemical fertilisers and weed killers and the use of tractors instead of horses. In addition, she chose her advisors and agents poorly, and some took advantage of her.

In autumn 1956, the estate had no cash reserves and was on the brink of insolvency. At the insistence of the Commune of Skatelöv, Stephens agreed to be declared legally incompetent (Omyndigförklaring, revocation of legal majority) in February 1957, at the age of 75, and became a ward of court. Two guardians were appointed, a lawyer and a bank director. They liquidated the industrial holdings, sold almost all the land Stephens had bought, and leased the agricultural land. Stephens appeal for reversal of the declaration of incompetence was denied; the guardians ended their term in 1962, and in 1963 a new guardian was appointed.

=== Huseby Affair ===
A series of prosecutions of her former advisors resulted, which attracted considerable public attention, increased by Stephens' appeals through the press for redress. Among the accused, Berl Gutenberg, a friend of Prince Carl's who had worked as a supervisor at the estate in the 1950s, was sentenced to three and a half years' penal servitude. The legal actions were completed in 1962.

=== Restoration of independence and death ===
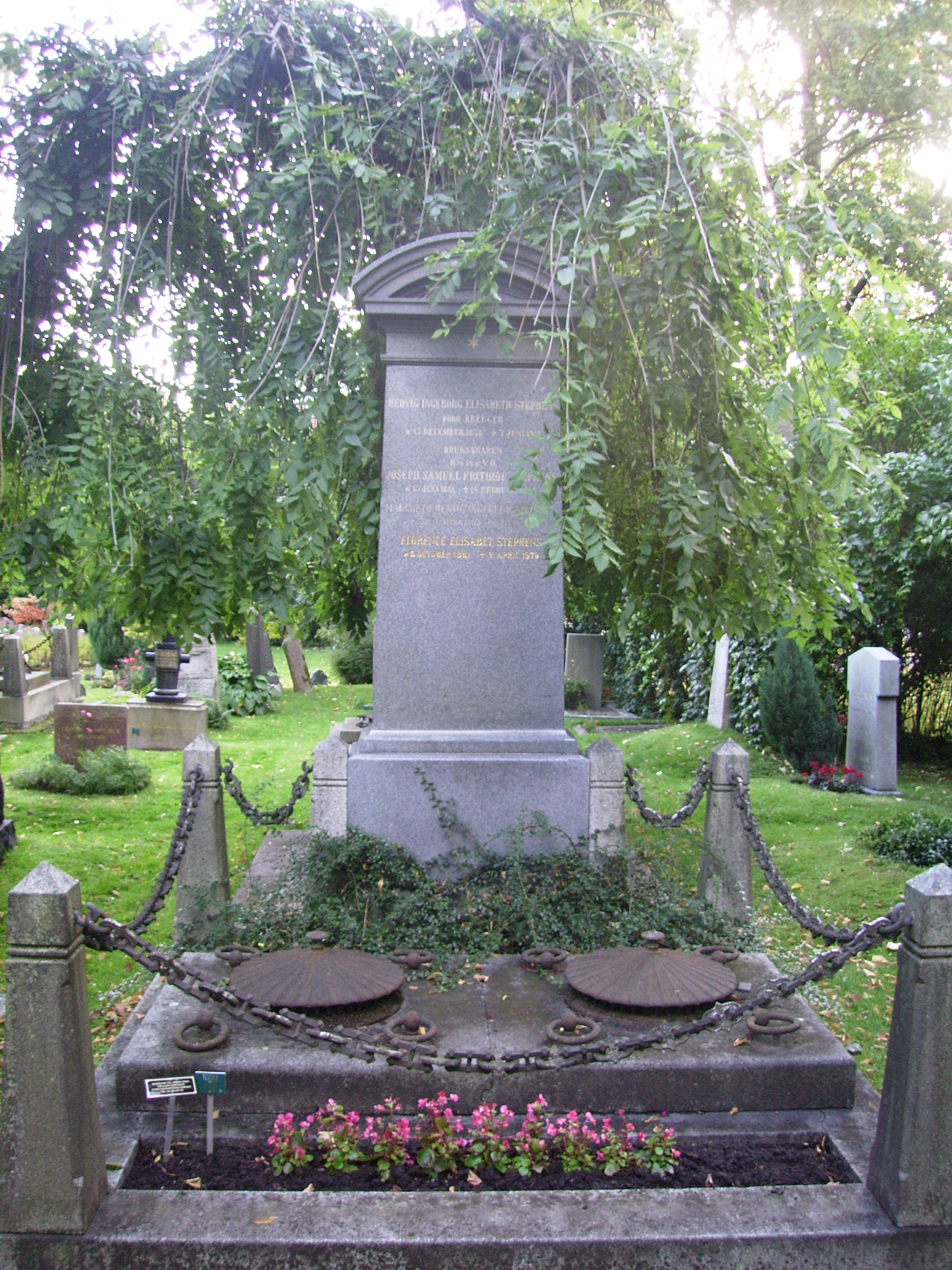
Stephens' grave in Solna churchyard

Stephens' legal competence was not restored until 1976, when a change in the law made economic incompetence an invalid reason for withdrawing adult rights. At 95, she was then instead assigned an advisor. On her death in 1979, aged 97, she bequeathed Huseby to the Swedish state, and it is now open to the public. She is buried in the family plot at Solna Church.

== Connection to Swedish royalty ==
Stephens' mother, Elisabeth Kreüger, was the daughter of a close associate of King Oscar II, and the king was present at Stephens' parents' wedding. There was speculation during Stephens' lifetime that she was the king's natural daughter. In 1950 the Stephens sisters donated to the Swedish national archives approximately 20 letters from the king to their mother, on condition that their contents remain secret; they were placed in the royal archives, to remain sealed until 30 years after Florence Stephens' death. In 2009 King Carl XVI Gustaf extended the ban on access to the letters until 2035.

== Honours ==
- Nilsson medal of the Royal Swedish Academy of Music; Stephens repurchased the birthplace of the opera singer Christina Nilsson, a former property of the Huseby estate, and erected a memorial on her centenary in 1943.

== Further information ==
- Skandalen på Huseby bruk. Documentary, Sveriges Radio P4, April 2021 (in Swedish): Part 1 (57 mins), Part 2 (36 mins)
- Ms. Florence Stephens, Huseby Bruk
- Florence Stephens at Svenskt kvinnobiografiskt lexikon
