= George Stephens (philologist) =

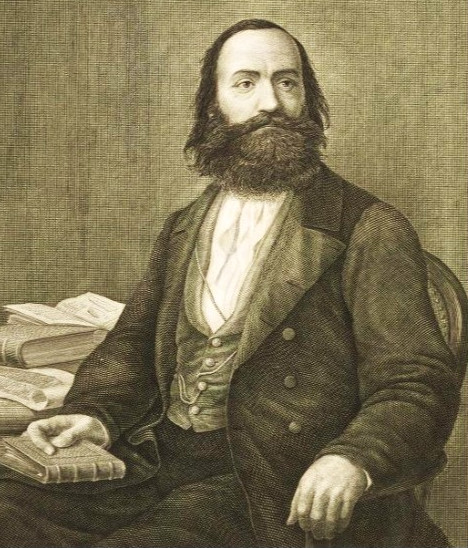
George Stephens 1868

George Stephens (13 December 1813 – 9 August 1895) was an English archeologist and philologist, who worked in Scandinavia, especially on interpreting runic inscriptions.

Born at Liverpool, Stephens studied at University College London. In 1834, he married Mary Bennett and moved to Sweden, studying Scandinavian medieval literature and folklore. His collection of fairy tales together with Gunnar Olof Hyltén-Cavallius was often reprinted. Stephens moved to Denmark, became a lecturer in English at Copenhagen University in 1851, and a professor in 1855. He published regularly in The Gentleman's Magazine. In 1860, he published the first edition of the Waldere fragments. In 1877, Uppsala University made him doctor honoris causa.

His brother was the Methodist minister Joseph Rayner Stephens. He died at Copenhagen in 1895. He was the grandfather of Florence Stephens.

== Bibliography ==
- Conversational outlines of English grammar: intended as an easy introduction to that language... (1837)
- Förteckning öfver de förnämsta brittiska och fransyska handskrifterna uti Kongl. bibliotheket i Stockholm (1847)
- Revenge, or Woman's Love: a melodrama in five acts (1857) (Eric the Victorious is one of the protagonists)
- The rescue of Robert Burns, February 1759 (1859)
- Two Leaves of King Waldere's Lay (1860)
- The Old-Northern runic monuments of Scandinavia and England, 4 volumes (1866–1901)
- Old Norse fairy tales (1882)
- The runes: whence came they (1894)
