= Kristine Bernadotte =

Norwegian-born Belgian princess

Princess Kristine Bernadotte
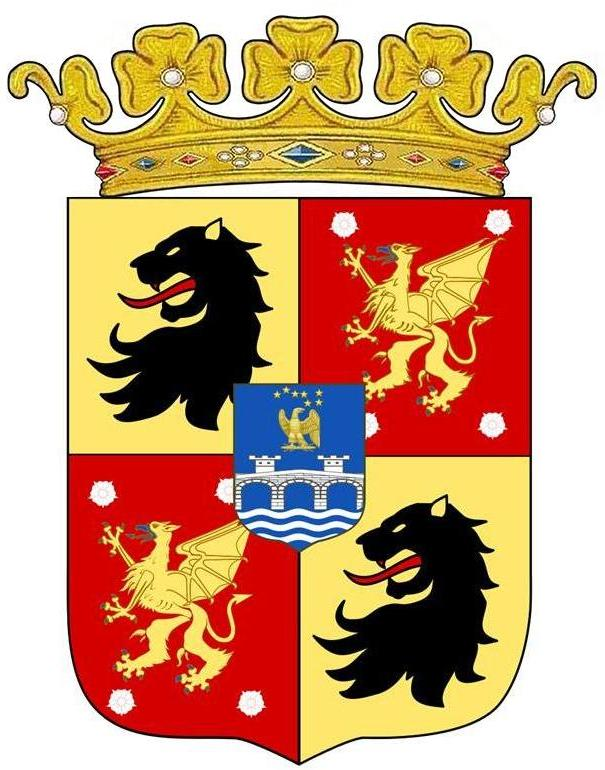
- Arms from 1937
- Born: Kristine Rivelsrud; 22 April 1932; Norway
- Died: 4 November 2014 (aged 82); Benalmádena, Spain
- Burial: Royal Cemetery, Solna, Sweden
- Spouse: Carl, Prince Bernadotte (m. 1978; died 2003)

Princess Kristine Bernadotte, born Kristine Rivelsrud, (22 April 1932 – 4 November 2014) was a Norwegian-born princess of Belgian nobility. She was the third wife and widow of Prince Carl Bernadotte, a former royal prince of Sweden, to whom she was married from 1978 until his death in 2003.

Kristine Riverlsrud, the daughter of an agricultural worker, was born in Norway in 1932. In 1961, Prince Carl Bernadotte divorced his second wife, Ann Larsson. In the wake of the divorce, Prince Bernadotte became romantically involved with Riverlsrud, who was working at the time as a domestic servant for his niece, Princess Ragnhild, Mrs. Lorentzen. and whom he first met while visiting Lorentzen as a house guest. Prince Bernadotte married Miss Rivelsrud in 1978 at a ceremony held at the Embassy of Sweden in Rabat, Morocco. The couple, who had no children, remained together until his death on 27 June 2003. She was a frequent guest of King Harald V of Norway and Queen Sonja of Norway and maintained a close relationship with the Norwegian royal family, which descends from Carl Bernadotte's sister Princess Märtha of Sweden. Those siblings were first cousins of King Gustaf VI Adolf of Sweden, the grandfather and immediate predecessor of the current Swedish king.

Princess Kristine Bernadotte died at her home, Villa Capricornio, in Benalmádena, Málaga, Spain, on 4 November 2014, at the age of 82. Her funeral was held at the royal chapel at Drottningholm Palace in Stockholm on 15 November 2014. Numerous members of the Swedish royal family and the Norwegian royal family attended her funeral. Members of the Norwegian royalty in attendance included King Harald V of Norway, Queen Sonja of Norway, Crown Prince Haakon, Mette-Marit, Crown Princess of Norway, Princess Märtha Louise and her husband, Ari Behn. Members of the Swedish royal family who attended Princess Bernadotte's funeral included King Carl XVI Gustaf, Queen Silvia of Sweden, Crown Princess Victoria, and Prince Daniel, Duke of Västergötland. She was the last holder of the Belgian noble title of Prince or Princess Bernadotte and the last surviving aunt of King Harald V of Norway, Kings Baudouin and Albert II of Belgium and Grand Duchess Joséphine Charlotte of Luxembourg. She was buried with her husband at the Royal Cemetery north of Stockholm.
