= Prince Bernadotte =

Multinational title of nobility

Prince Bernadotte is a title that has been used by several members of the House of Bernadotte. It is most commonly known as a title granted to men who were formerly titled as princes of Sweden before losing their royal titles when they married unequally and against the Swedish constitution (enskild mans dotter [approximately "daughter of a common man"]). It was created in 1892 as a non-hereditary title in the nobility of Luxembourg and conferred upon Oscar Bernadotte by Adolphe, Grand Duke of Luxembourg. A title with the same name was subsequently created in 1937 as a non-hereditary title in the nobility of Belgium and conferred upon Carl Bernadotte by King Leopold III of Belgium. The wives of these princes of Luxembourgish and Belgian nobility were then granted the title of Princess Bernadotte. The title was also used in the early 19th century with reference to Jean Baptiste Jules Bernadotte, the subsequent founder of the Swedish royal House of Bernadotte.

== First French Empire ==
=== Prince Bernadotte 1806–1810 ===
King Charles XIV John of Sweden (also King Charles III John of Norway), who had been born in France as Jean Bernadotte, was made ruler of the Principality of Pontecorvo by Napoleon I in 1806 and was as such styled Prince Bernadotte, this before he was elected as Crown Prince of Sweden in 1810. Some Swedish experts have asserted that all of his male heirs have had the right to use that title, since the Swedish government never made all of the payments promised to Charles John to get him to give up his position in the Principality of Pontecorvo.

Arms of Bernadotte as Prince of Pontecorvo

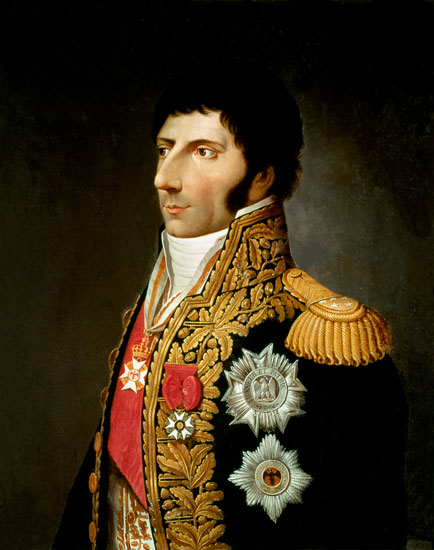
Marshal Bernadotte in 1805

== Belgium ==
=== Prince Bernadotte 1937–2014 ===
Carl Bernadotte was born as Prince of Sweden and Duke of Östergötland, but he gave up those titles when he married below his station in 1937. Carl's brother-in-law, King Leopold III of the Belgians, conferred upon him the title of Prince Bernadotte in the Belgian nobility on the day of Carl's first marriage with Countess Elsa von Rosen on 6 July 1937. It had its own coat of arms and was a noble title, that is a prince as a high rank of Belgian nobility, not a royal title. The title was personal to him and his wive(s), with the right to a comital title for his children and male-line descendants. The princely title is now extinct, with the death of Carl's third wife Princess Kristine Bernadotte in 2014. Carl had only one child, Countess Madeleine Bernadotte.

In Sweden, Carl's princely Bernadotte family was considered a part of the unintroduced nobility and joined a private club called Ointroducerad Adels Förening ("The Association of the Unintroduced Nobility").

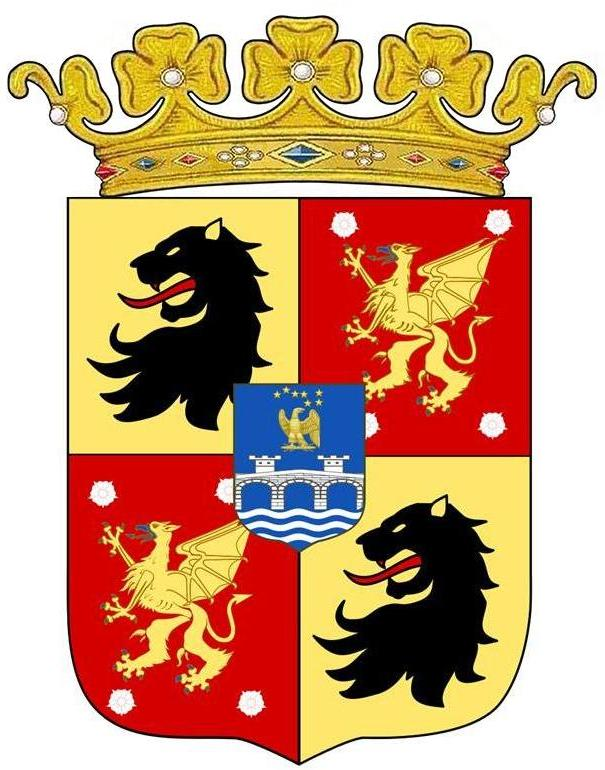
Coat of arms of Prince Bernadotte in the nobility of Belgium

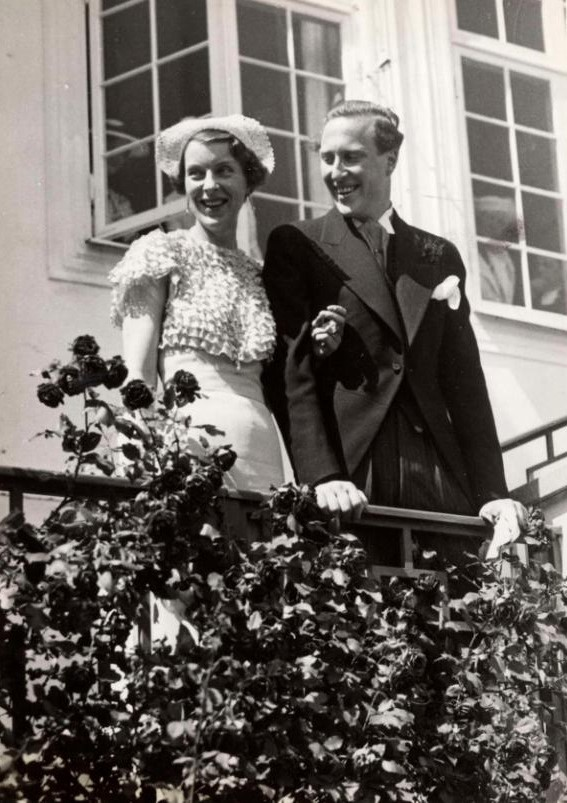
Prince Carl Bernadotte marries his first wife

== Luxembourg ==
=== Prince Bernadotte, 1892–2025 ===
Oscar Bernadotte renounced his titles as Prince of Sweden and Duke of Gotland when he married below his station in 1888. However, he was allowed by his father, King Oscar II, to keep the courtesy title of Prince and then be styled as Prince Bernadotte. The title became official as one of nobility (not just a courtesy title) when he and his wife were created Prince(ss) Bernadotte (personal title for life) and Count(ess) of Wisborg (hereditary to male-line descendants) in 1892 by his maternal uncle, Grand Duke Adolphe of Luxembourg.

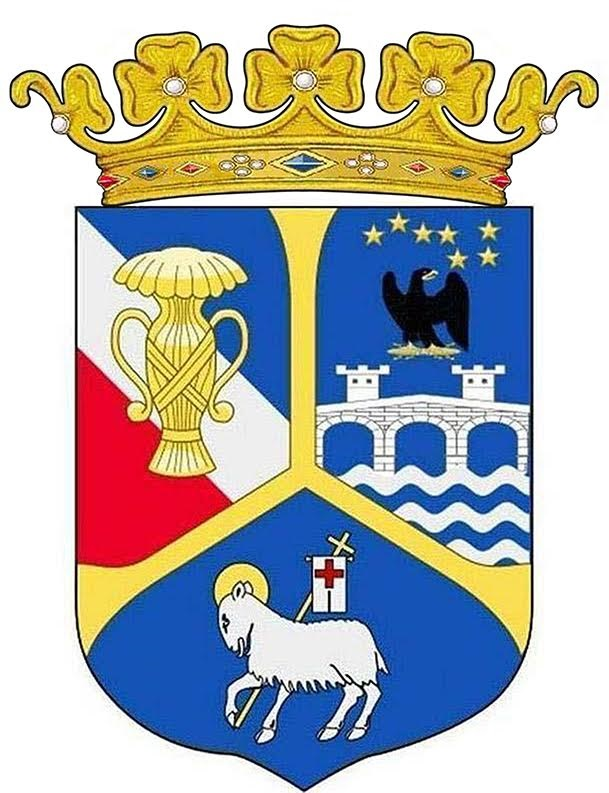
Coat of arms of Prince Bernadotte in the nobility of Luxembourg

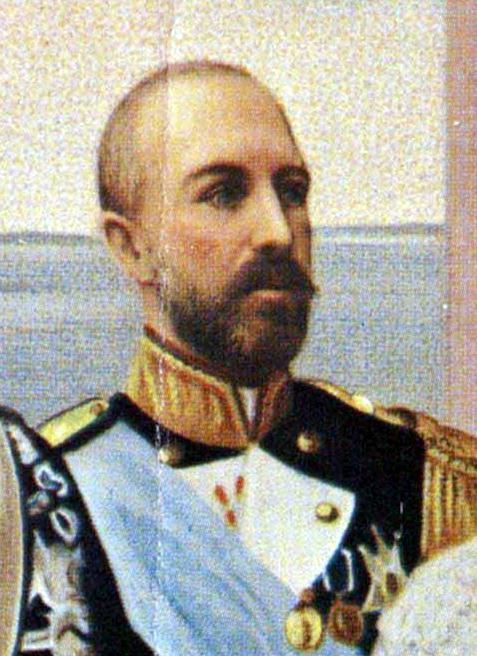
Prince Oscar Bernadotte in 1905

Oscar's grandnephews, Sigvard, Carl Johan and Lennart (who all had been denied use of their Swedish titles after marrying below their station), were also incorporated into the Luxembourgish nobility and herewith created hereditary Counts of Wisborg in 1951. In those government documents however, which refer to Oscar's titles, they and their wives were also styled and recognized as Princes and Princesses Bernadotte, with their own specific arms surmounted by the coronet for that rank. That personal title remained largely out of use for them and is unlisted in Swedish government publications and genealogical handbooks, but is used intermittently in other media and publicity. One of their widows, Marianne Bernadotte, survived until 2025. Her late husband announced to Swedish media in 1983 that his title was Prince Sigvard Bernadotte. That has never been recognized by his nephew, King Carl XVI Gustaf of Sweden. According to all six books of memoires by Sigvard, Carl Johan and Lennart Bernadotte, two of their wives and a more recent summary of these matters Crown Prince (later King) Gustaf Adolf of Sweden from the 1930s on had played an integral and abiding part in the removal and denial of their Swedish titles and privileges. His granddaughter Queen Margrethe II of Denmark has commented on this, saying that he probably would have treated his sons better if their royal British mother Crown Princess Margareta had lived longer.
