= Carl Bernadotte =

Prince Bernadotte

Carl
- Prince Bernadotte prev. Duke of Östergötland
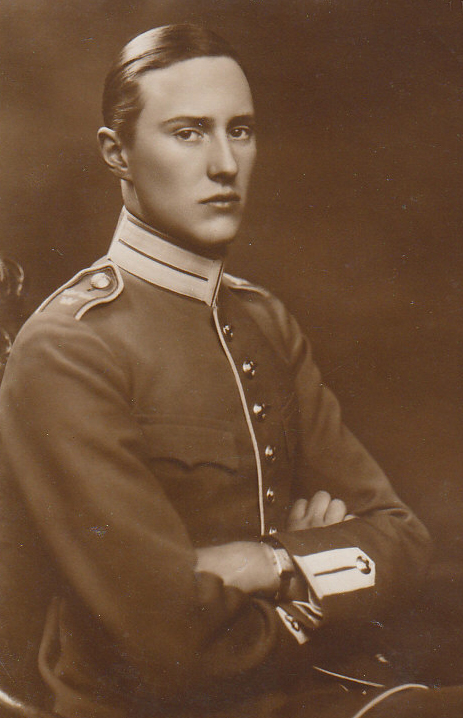
- Prince Carl in the 1930s
- Born: 10 January 1911; Stockholm, Sweden
- Died: 27 June 2003 (aged 92); Málaga, Spain
- Spouse: Countess Elsa von Rosen (m. 1937; div. 1951) Anna Margareta (Ann) Larsson (m. 1954; div. 1961) Kristine Rivelsrud (m. 1978)
- Issue: Countess Madeleine Bernadotte
Names
- Carl Gustaf Oscar Fredrik Christian
- House: Bernadotte
- Father: Prince Carl, Duke of Västergötland
- Mother: Princess Ingeborg of Denmark

Carl Gustaf Oscar Fredrik Christian, Prince Bernadotte (10 January 1911 – 27 June 2003), originally Prince Carl, Duke of Östergötland, was the youngest child and only son of Prince Carl of Sweden and Princess Ingeborg of Denmark and eventually a prince of the Belgian nobility. To distinguish himself from his father, he was widely known as Carl Junior. He was the brother of Princess Margaretha of Sweden, Crown Princess Märtha of Norway and Queen Astrid of Belgium.

== Marriage and loss of status ==
When Prince Carl married Countess Elsa von Rosen (1904–1991), on 6 July 1937 at Kvillinge, Sweden, he had to relinquish his succession rights and his royal titles. She was the daughter of one Count von Rosen and ex-wife of another Count von Rosen and niece of Count Eric von Rosen and Count Clarence von Rosen. Bernadotte's brother-in-law, King Leopold III of the Belgians, conferred upon him the title of Prince Bernadotte in the Belgian nobility on the same date, with the right to a comital title for his male-line descendants. They had one daughter, Countess Madeleine Bernadotte (Madeleine Astrid Ingeborg Ella Elsa, born in Stockholm, 8 October 1938), and were divorced in 1951. Through his daughter he was grandfather of Belgian actress Astrid Whettnall.

He married secondly Anna Margareta (Ann) Larsson (1921–1975) at Danderyd, Sweden, on 1 November 1954. They divorced in 1961 without issue. His third and final marriage took place at the Embassy of Sweden in Rabat, Morocco, on 8 June 1978, when he married Kristine Rivelsrud.

Bernadotte died at the age of 92 on 27 June 2003 in Málaga, Spain. He was the last surviving grandchild of Oscar II of Sweden. His widow, Princess Kristine Bernadotte, died at their home at Villa Capricornio in Benalmádena, Spain, on 4 November 2014 at the age of 82, without issue. His daughter Madeleine married Belgian Count Charles-Albert Ullens de Schooten-Whettnall (1927–2006) in 1962. The couple had four children and were divorced in 1980. She subsequently the same year married to Nicolaos "Nicos" Eletherios Kogevinas with whom she has a daughter, Désirée. She was widowed in 2006.

== The Huseby scandal ==
Carl Bernadotte was at the centre of the Huseby scandal that occurred in the late 1950s in Sweden amidst a great deal of publicity. Bernadotte and other suspects had gained the trust of Florence Stephens, a wealthy elderly heiress of a large estate near Växjö in southern Sweden. A complex set of criminal transactions led to the ruin of Stephens and brought Bernadotte and the others to court. Bernadotte was acquitted, in spite of his full confession – it was considered that he had no criminal intent. Bernadotte left Sweden shortly after the trial and spent the rest of his life in Spain.

== Honours and arms ==
=== Honours ===
- Sweden:
  - Knight and Commander of the Royal Order of the Seraphim, 10 January 1911
  - Knight of the Royal Order of Charles XIII, 10 January 1911
- Belgium: Grand Cordon of the Order of Leopold
- Denmark: Knight of the Order of the Elephant, 5 December 1933
- Empire of Japan: Grand Cordon of the Order of the Rising Sun
- Norway: Grand Cross of the Royal Norwegian Order of Saint Olav, with Collar, 19 March 1929

=== Arms ===
Arms of Prince Carl, Duke of Östergötland from 1911 to 1937	Bernadotte's arms after 1937

== Ancestry ==
Ancestors of Carl Bernadotte

8. Oscar I of Sweden
4. Oscar II of Sweden
9. Princess Joséphine of Leuchtenberg
2. Prince Carl, Duke of Västergötland
10. William, Duke of Nassau
5. Princess Sophia of Nassau
11. Princess Pauline of Württemberg
1. Prince Carl, Duke of Östergötland
12. Christian IX of Denmark
6. Frederick VIII of Denmark
13. Princess Louise of Hesse-Kassel
3. Princess Ingeborg of Denmark
14. Charles XV of Sweden
7. Princess Louise of Sweden
15. Princess Louise of the Netherlands
