= Oberdorfer =

Oberdorfer is a surname. Notable people with the surname include:

- Don Oberdorfer (born 1931), American journalist and academic
- Erich Oberdorfer (1905–2002), German botanist
- Louis F. Oberdorfer (1919–2013), American judge
- Pauline Oberdorfer (1889–1963), was one of the founders of Delta Sigma Theta, Inc.
