= Alwin Seifert =

German horticultural architect

Alwin Seifert (31 May 1890 in Munich – 27 February 1972 in Dießen am Ammersee) was a German horticultural architect, architect, university teacher, landscape designer, local curator, and conservationist. He is considered to be one of the most important representatives of the early ecological movement and biodynamic agriculture.

== Origin and education ==
Seifert was born the son of the construction engineer and contractor Hermann Seifert. His mother Anna Sourell, who came from a Huguenot family, died while giving birth. From 1909 he studied architecture at the Technical University of Munich and completed an apprenticeship as a mason in the summer months from 1909 to 1911, which he completed in 1912 with the journeyman's examination. He completed his studies in 1913 with a diploma. He then worked as a construction technician and site manager in a Munich construction company. During the First World War he volunteered for the railway troops in 1915 and was a lieutenant at the end of the war.

After the war, Seifert took over his father's construction business, which went bankrupt during the hyperinflation in 1920. From 1920 to 1923 he was a university assistant at the Technical University of Munich with Emil von Mecenseffy and Hermann Buchert in the areas of structural engineering and agricultural construction. In 1923 he started his own business as an architect. Seifert married Maria Orff, sister of the composer Carl Orff, for the second time in 1924. The marriage remained childless.

Seifert, who was already interested in landscape and flora as a high school student, trained himself as a landscape architect, as there was neither a defined job description nor a course for this profession at that time. He was influenced on the one hand by the youth movement's understanding of nature, which he had joined as a member of the Wandervogels. Second, he adopted the writings of Paul Schultze-Naumburg to landscape and technology as well as the design of biodynamic agriculture of the anthroposophy of Rudolf Steiner. In 1932 he got a teaching position at the Technical University of Munich, which he was able to redesign himself to later become the title "practical garden design".

Through his work, Seifert came into contact with the homeland security movement. He became a member of the Bavarian State Association for Homeland Security and has been a member of its Small Building Committee since 1926. In 1927 he began to publish in scientific journals and made in 1929 with the essay "Thoughts on indigenous garden design" in the journal garden design attracts attention. In 1932 he took on a teaching position for garden design and agricultural construction at the Technical University of Munich, which he held until 1944.

== Role in National Socialism ==
Seifert's role in National Socialism is shaped by his own trivializing presentation, which he presented in particular in the arbitration chamber proceedings for denazification. It was refuted years later.

=== Early connections with National Socialism ===
According to Joachim Wolschke-Buhlmahn and Gert Gröning, Seifert belonged to the secret Thule Society. The historian Thomas Zeller sees no evidence of this. According to Seifert's own statements, he had joined the Widar League in 1919. Possibly it was a lodge belonging to the Thule Society. There he allegedly met Rudolf Hess, though such a connection has not been proven. At least from 1919 to 1921 he was a member of the German National People's Party (DNVP). Seifert's ethnic and anti-Semitic attitudes allowed him to easily connect with Nazism.

In 1937, he became a member of the NSDAP, but later claimed that he had never been entirely in line with National Socialist ideology. Thus he adhered to the racial theory of the botanist Friedrich Merkenschlager, an early National Socialist who fell out with Walther Darré in 1933. Seifert's influence during the Nazi era resulted less from his institutional functions than from his personal connections. He benefited from funding from Hess and Fritz Todt and claimed that he lost influence after Todt's death and Hess's "England flight". The fact that he had also acted as a contact person for the anthroposophical movement made him suspicious in the eyes of the Reich Security Main Office, which had him monitored temporarily in 1941.

=== Reich landscape attorney ===
In 1933 he was assigned to the staff of the commissioner (later general inspector) for motorway construction Fritz Todt, and in 1934 appointed advisor for questions relating to the integration of the landscape in motorway construction. He used this function to get in close contact with Nazi party leaders; He conducted intensive correspondence with Rudolf Hess, Martin Bormann, Heinrich Himmler, Walther Darré, Albert Speer, and Oswald Pohl. He also tried to influence the party leadership by means of polemical articles in favor of nature and the landscape. So he demanded in the polemic The desertification of Germany, to create the position of general inspector for the German water industry including a research institute. Charges were brought against him for denigrating the Reich Labor Service, but he was nevertheless able to successfully position alternative hydraulic engineering methods. In 1938 Adolf Hitler awarded him the honorary title of "Professor".

On May 31, 1940, on the occasion of his 50th birthday, he was appointed "Reichslandschaftanwalt". Seifert, who became an influential advisor to Todt, gathered landscape architects, plant sociologists, and conservationists around him, with whom he tried to implement his ideas. In particular, he was instrumental in ensuring that every top construction management of the Reichsautobahn got its own "landscape attorney", who was responsible for all the relevant measures and was involved in the staking out of the motorway routes. In order to achieve his goal of a "landscape-friendly" motorway, he commissioned the plant sociologist Reinhold Tüxen to develop the area of the Reichsautobahnen plant sociologically based on Tüxen's construct to map potential natural vegetation. This mapping would serve as the basis for a natural "German" planting. In addition, he perceived steppe landscapes as "un-German" and demanded that the Eastern European areas conquered by the Wehrmacht be "Germanized" by planting field hedges. He criticized Rudolf Hess for the fact that the Nazi racial ideology was too one-sidedly “Nordic” and wanted to see an “Alpine race” included in it. In the sense of an export of nature conservation problems of the "Altreich" to the east, Seifert stated that "our Alpine lakes" (in the specific case the Tyrolean Plansee) as a training ground for the navy would have to be “spared” “as long as there is an inland lake outside Germany”. It is unclear whether Seifert was involved in the experiments in the anthroposophically influenced medicinal herb plantation of the Dachau concentration camp, where concentration camp prisoners had to do work.

He also derived his ideas of a near-natural hydraulic engineering from his folk ideas and thus became one of the founding fathers of engineering biology . Another field in which Seifert was active was biodynamic agriculture, which goes back to the anthroposophist Rudolf Steiner.

During the Nazi era, Seifert referred to the nature prophet and pacifist Gustav Gräser, a student of the life reformer Karl Wilhelm Diefenbach, whom he portrayed in his book The Age of Living as a “herald” and “forerunner” of this same age.

== Denazification process ==
After the Second World War, Seifert's NS Ordensburg Sonthofen was placed on the list of literature to be sorted out in the Soviet occupation zone.

Seifert succeeded in the denazification process initially as a “fellow traveler”, later (1949) to be classified as “unencumbered” because he had to accept “considerable economic and professional disadvantages” under National Socialism. Seifert claimed that the Reichsleiter of the NSDAP, Martin Bormann, prevented Seifert from receiving a chair in 1938. He got himself influenced by anthroposophy in the early 1940, turned away from his “racial arrogance”, which was born out of his materialistic attitude and which had buried the natural instincts for the real values of a person for more than a decade. With Todt's death and Hess's flight to England in 1942, he lost his support in the regime and was massively disadvantaged as a result. His correspondence with party officials "only served scientific tasks or the defense of his professional position". In his favor it was taken into account that he campaigned for the racially persecuted and that he criticized the architecture of party buildings.

Phillip Auerbach, as State Commissioner for Racially, Religiously, and Politically Persecuted Persons, was appalled and initiated a retrial against Seifert, which ended in the second instance in October 1949 with the classification as "unencumbered". Seifert stood up for the biodynamic economy with great moral courage, spoke out in favor of Jews and politically persecuted students and accepted financial and professional disadvantages in the process.

In none of the proceedings could the party records that had been seized by the US military government be viewed . When these were finally available, it became clear that Seifert was by no means only patronized by Todt and Hess, but was in close contact with a large number of top party officials and that Himmler, Speer and Pohl had systematically advocated him.

=== In the Federal Republic of Germany ===
He continued to use the title “Reichslandschaftsanwalt” on his stationery and tried to underline his continued great influence on landscape architecture with a title: he did not succeed in becoming a “federal landscape attorney”. In 1950, he took up his teaching position at the TH Munich again and in 1954 he succeeded in receiving a chair for landscape maintenance, landscape design, and road and hydraulic engineering. This was expressly described as reparation for the disadvantages suffered in the Third Reich. From 1950 to 1970 he was employed as a consultant in hydraulic engineering and designed the integration of the landscape and the design of barrageson the Danube and during the expansion of the Moselle into a major shipping route. He was involved in the construction of the Jochenstein power plant and, from 1954 on, the Main-Danube Canal. At his chair he was formative for the development of the landscape architect profession.

From 1958 to 1963 he was the "federal leader" of the federal nature conservation in Bavaria. In 1961, Seifert was one of the 16 signatories of the Green Charter of Mainau, which was initiated by Count Lennart Bernadotte and announced on site by Federal President Heinrich Lübke.

Seifert had been composting in his own garden in Munich-Laim since 1930 and published his findings since 1945. With his book Gärtnern, Ackern ohne Poison, which is still published today, he wrote a work on organic farming that was particularly popular in the burgeoning green-ecological movement in the early 1970s. This was propagated among other things in circles of the World Federation for the protection of life.

== Buildings ==
- 1923: Waitzacker estate in Weilheim (Upper Bavaria)
- 1924/25: residential and studio house for the sculptor Anna von Hentig; associated garden with terracing, paths, stairs and walls; with enclosure in Munich-Laim (inhabited by S.)
- 1929: Three rows of houses with green spaces at Weßlinger Strasse 1–16 and Stürzerstrasse 40–52 in Munich
- 1931: Country house near Meersburg
- 1951–1961: Design of the Pfreimd power plant group
- 1952–1954: Jochenstein power station outdoor facilities
- 1958–1959: Own house on Ammersee

== Gardens and parks ==
- before 1940: Wohngarten S. in Munich-Laim
- 1938: Schwangau spa gardens
- 1938: Garten B. in Munich-Biederstein, Klementinenstrasse 8 (with Roderich Fick )
- before 1940: gardens at a country palace in Luxembourg
- 1950: Green areas on new row apartment buildings in Munich- Schwabing (with Ernst Barth )
- before 1955: Garden to an administration building in the Rhineland (with Prof. Bernhard Bleeker)
- before 1955: residential garden at Auer Mühlbach in Munich
- before 1955: Small residential garden in the Rhineland

== Memberships and honors after 1945 ==
- Honorary member of the University of Innsbruck
- 1960: Fritz Schumacher Prize from the University of Hanover
- 1961: Large Federal Cross of Merit
- 1966: Bavarian Order of Merit
- 1969: Friedrich Ludwig v. Sckell Ring of Honor of the Bavarian Academy of Fine Arts
- 1971: Ludwig Thoma Medal from the City of Munich

== Books ==
- 1930: Down-to-earth garden art . In: Gartenkunst Heft 43/1930, pp. 162–164.
- 1931: From garden fences to gazebos - woodwork for garden friends . Gartenbauverlag Trowitzsch und Sohn, Frankfurt / Oder
- 1933: The coming garden . In: Deutsche Bauzeitung, issue 67/1933, pp. 367–371.
- 1937: Nature and technology in German road construction . In: Naturschutz, issue 18/1937, 229–232.
- 1938: Hydraulic engineering closer to nature . In: Die Deutsche Wasserwirtschaft, issue 12/1938: 361–366
- 1938: Alpine walls In: Research work from road construction, Vol. 11, Berlin 1938
- 1943: The real house in Gau Tirol-Vorarlberg. An investigation into the nature and origin of the alpine flat roof house and the principles of a rebirth in the spirit of our time . 83 p., With num. Fig. Alpenschriften, Innsbruck (Gau-Verlag)
- 1943: In the age of the living. Nature - home - technology . First volume. Müller publishing house, Planegg
- 1944: The hedge landscape . Potsdam Lectures VIII, Potsdam
- 1945/1948/1957?: Compost primer for the Bavarian farmer (forerunner of: gardeners, fields - without poison )
- 1950: Italian gardens. A picture book . 110 p., G. Callwey publishing house, Munich
- 1959: The restoration of the landscape in the area of quarries . Nature and landscape 34:40.
- 1962: A life for the landscape . 160 pp., 49 ills., Eugen Diederichs Verlag, Düsseldorf / Cologne
- 1964: Compost in the garden without poisons - primer for small and large gardeners, farmers and farmers . 121 S., Wirtschaftsverlag M. Klug, Munich-Pasing
- 1971: gardening, farming - without poison . 209 p., With 14 illustrations, Biederstein-Verlag, Munich
- 2008: Gardening, tillage - without poison. With an afterword by Hansjörg Küster. Verlag CH Beck, Munich, 251st - 255th thousand of the total print run
