= Green Charter of Mainau =

The Green Charter of Mainau (German: Grüne Charta von der Mainau) is a manifesto that was initiated by Prince Lennart Bernadotte and promulgated by Federal President Lübke who was present at the conference. It was signed on April 20, 1961. The occasion was the fifth Mainau round table by 16 leaders in the field of nature and landscape protection in the Federal Republic of Germany.

The signatories included Konrad Buchwald, Gerhard Olschowy, Walter Rossow, Ernst Schröder, Alwin Seifert, and Alfred Toepfer.

The Green Charter of the Mainau is the model of the "Green Charter of the CDU South Baden". This is a comprehensive environmental strategy written in 1984 by the then Government Minister Norbert Nothhelfer and the then chairman of the CDU faction in the parliament and later Prime Minister Erwin Teufel in the environmental policy of Baden-Wuerttemberg was brought in.

== Content ==
The charter summarizes the demands in 12 points:

- A legally enforceable spatial planning for all planning levels, considering the natural conditions.
- The preparation of landscape plans, green space plans in all municipalities for settlement, industrial, and traffic areas.
- Sufficient recreational space through the provision of garden land, free access to forests, mountains, lakes and rivers and other scenic beauties, urban open space near the apartment for daily recreation, urban recreational space for the weekend, and remote recreational space for holidays.
- Securing and developing sustainable, fertile agriculture and an orderly rural settlement.
- Increased measures to maintain and restore a healthy natural balance, in particular through soil protection, climate, and water protection.
- The conservation and sustainable use of existing natural or man-made green.
- The prevention of avoidable interventions that damage the landscape, e.g., B. in settlement and industrial construction, in mining, hydraulic engineering, and road construction.
- The reparation of unavoidable interference, in particular the re-greening of upland.
- A change in the thinking of the entire population through increased public information about the importance of the landscape in town and country and the dangers that threaten it.
- The greater consideration of the natural and landscape principles in education and training.
- The expansion of research for all-natural habitat related disciplines.
- Sufficient legislative measures to promote and secure healthy living space.

In 1962, the signatories of the charter consequently also founded an association, the Deutscher Rat für Landespflege, the German Council for Land Care (DRL for short), which has set itself the task of putting the demands made into practice: through research, model projects and advice to authorities dealing with spatial planning and nature conservation deals.

In 2011, Hans-Werner Frohn published an article in the journal Studienarchiv Umweltgeschichte, Study Archive Environmental History with the title 50 years of the “Green Charter of Mainau”. Pioneering nature conservation and environmental document opened a window to modernity in Germany. - On the genesis of the “Green Charter of Mainau”.

== Resulting Initiatives ==
The Green Charter of Mainau, became the template for the International Ski Federation's Mainau Forums and Mainau Manifestos and the sports commitment to the environment and climate change.
