= Reinhold Tüxen =

German botanist and plant sociologist (1899–1980)

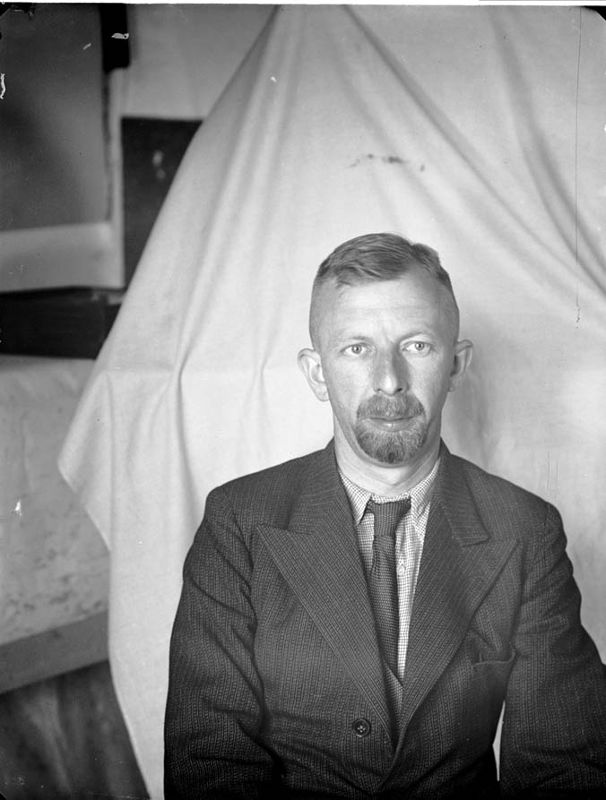
Reinhold Tüxen in 1937

Reinhold Hermann Hans Tüxen (born 21 May 1899 in Ulsnis (Schleswig-Holstein); died 16 May 1980 in Rinteln) was a German botanist and plant sociologist. Along with Erich Oberdorfer, he was one of the early promoters and founders of modern plant sociology in Germany. His botanical author's abbreviation is Tüxen; in plant sociology, the abbreviation Tx. is also in use.

During the Third Reich Tüxen mapped the flora at Auschwitz for the plan of the SS model city of Auschwitz, as a pilot project for the integration of a conquered city. Here "German plants" were to form a border between the residential city and the extermination camp. However, in 1942 he was removed as chairman of the German working group for plant sociology due to a lack of Nazi Party membership and alleged political unreliability.

== Early life and education ==
Reinhold Tüxen was born as the son of the teacher Hermann Christian Tüxen and his wife Anna Catharina Tüxen (née Lüthge). He grew up in the rural north of Schleswig-Holstein, in the Schleiregion of fishing, between the cities of Schleswig and Kappeln, where the Nordschau, a rural beech forest, was one of the most intimate play and discovery areas in his childhood . This childlike character was at the beginning of a scientific career that ultimately made Reinhold Tüxen one of the pioneers of plant sociology. Tüxen put 1917 Notabitur and then participated in World War I. In 1926, shortly after receiving his doctorate in biology, he married Johanna Berger. The couple had three sons: Jes Tüxen (1929–2015), who was to become an important moor botanist, Fritz Tüxen and Hans Tüxen. The family lived first in Hannover, later in Stolzenau on the Weser and when Tüxen retired in 1963, Rinteln.

== Early scientific career ==
Tüxen studied from 1919 to 1925, initially also art, but then focused on chemistry, botany and geology in Heidelberg, then plant sociology with Josias Braun-Blanquet at the ETH Zurich and in Montpellier. The contact with Braun-Blanquet, who is considered to be the actual founder of plant sociology, is likely to have shaped the further direction of Tüxen's work. Over the following decades they were close friends and went on several research trips together.

In 1926, Tüxen received his doctorate from the University of Heidelberg with a thesis on 1,5-naphthalene disulfone hydrazide and 1,5-naphthalene disulfonazide and its behavior towards malonic esters with Theodor Curtius, however, with a classical chemical thesis summa cum laude. From 1925 he built the Provincial Agency for Nature Conservation at the Landesmuseum Hannover. In 1927, he founded the Floristic-Sociological Working Group in Lower Saxony in Göttingen, which was expressly intended to bring together scientists and interested laypeople, and from 1928 onwards it published its own journal, the communications of the Floristic-Sociological Working Group.

In 1929 he completed his habilitation at the University of Veterinary Medicine Hannover on the subject of grassland associations in Northwest Germany. There, in May 1931, he founded the department for theoretical and applied plant sociology at the University of Veterinary Medicine, Hannover. Even in this early phase of his work, Tüxen worked intensively on vegetation mapping, which was to remain one of his most important scientific tools throughout his life, and laid the foundations for his pioneering work in the field of plant sociology. By 1934, he and his colleagues completed a vegetation mapping of large parts of northern Germany on 75 map sheets at a scale of 1: 25,000.

== In the German Reich from 1933 to 1945 ==
In 1933 he was commissioned by Governor Ludwig Geßner (1886–1958) to map the vegetation of the entire province of Hannover. Looking back, Tüxen said that this task marked the breakthrough in German plant sociology as a discipline. He was able to correlate scientific objectives with practical requirements by inferring from his results the optimal economic use of an area (e.g. grassland management). Alwin Seifert, who, as a realm landscape attorney, was supposed to connect the planned motorways with the German landscape, needed a botanist. This first had to map the existing vegetation of the planned routes. Then Tüxen should take into account in his proposals which plants should be considered indigenous in the sense of the blood and soil ideology, and which corresponded best to the existing climatic and soil conditions. The aim was to keep the maintenance effort for the planted vegetation as low as possible due to the resilience based on the selection. The selection was based on ideological and scientific criteria. Organizationally, this resulted in an alliance with National Socialist road construction.

It gave Tüxen access to the elites of the Third Reich and was decisive for his personal advancement, as well as for that of the subject of plant sociology in Germany. Fritz Todt, the inspector general for German roads who was responsible for motorway construction under Adolf Hitler, relied on Tüxen. When Todt was ordered to accelerate the construction of the western wall in 1938, Tüxen also used his methods and suggestions for planting and thus camouflaging the bunkers.

Before that, he was involved in the planning of the Nazi party rally grounds in Nuremberg. In 1936/1937, Tüxen made suggestions for the selection of the lawn mixture, which had to be optimally adapted to the loads of the marches carried out there, as well as for the planting of the area. I.a. his vote for an oak-birch forest led to the planting of around 42,000 deciduous trees, mostly oaks between the ages of 2–60 years. They replaced parts of the older park and local recreation facility. In addition, Tüxen recommended planting gorse, aspen, and birch to give the newly created SA camp a forest-like character. In 1937 at the latest there was a substantive relationship with the forest administration. Because on 25 October 1937, the examination subject plant sociology was introduced into the new study regulations for forest science. According to Hermann Göring's will, the forest trainees were to learn which tree species could be used to rejuvenate and reforest German forests.

In 1937, Tüxen published The Plant Societies of Northwest Germany, which remained a standard work for plant sociologists in the region and in the Netherlands for decades. In 1938 the floristic-sociological working group in Lower Saxony was merged into the German working group for plant sociology as part of the coordination of numerous organizations in the German Reich. Tüxen initially remained chairman of the working group, but was replaced by Erwin Aichinger in 1941 due to a lack of NSDAP membership and alleged political unreliability. In 1942 the working group was forced to dissolve.

In 1939, Tüxen achieved a further institutionalization of his field of work: he became head of the newly established Central Office for Vegetation Mapping of the Reich. In the same year he received an extraordinary professorship at the University of Veterinary Medicine Hannover. In addition, he began in Hannover to set up one of the first botanical gardens based on the knowledge of plant sociology.

When the Second World War broke out, Tüxen was drafted into military service. However, the protection of the Reich Forestry Office enabled him to leave the military in the same year and return to his work. The basis was presumably a decision that Hermann Göring had already made in June 1939 in his role as Reichsforstmeister: jobs for vegetation mapping were to be integrated into the forest management offices. The most important one should be set up in Hannover at the Central Office for Vegetation Mapping of the Reich, i.e. near Tüxen, if it should also remain subordinate to the Kassel Forestry Agency. In August he then apparently handed this staff over directly to Tüxen, with the task of carrying out a vegetation mapping of the entire German Reich. After the major territorial gains of the Axis Powers in Eastern Europe, Tüxen's position was given even more tasks, including mapping the vegetation around the Auschwitz concentration camp. He noted himself: In the vicinity of Auschwitz (East Upper Silesia) a vegetation mapping was made of a larger area as the basis for the reorganization of all economic conditions. (* 24, editor, Miss von Rochow, Sauer, Tx., 1:25 000).

In 1942 Tüxen expanded his sphere of activity. Albert Speer as the successor of Todt in his offices and Göring as Reichsforstmeister were arguing at this time about the utilization of the Tüxen staff for their respective areas. In 1942, Göring demanded that a separate sub-department be set up for the interests of the General Inspector for Water and Energy and German Roads, which he should finance himself. However, actually prevented until 1943, the Finance Minister Lutz Graf Schwerin von Krosigk the implementation of this project, since he could recognize in no meaning for the war success. This resistance did not last long, however, because on 11 March 1943 the following tasks and projects were classified or legitimized as important to the war effort.

1. Plant-sociological advice on camouflage work on the Atlantic, Channel and North Sea coasts and possibly the Mediterranean coast, which were started in November 1942 for Belgium and northern France.
2. A 1: 1 million vegetation mapping of occupied Russia is to be drawn up in conjunction with Provincial Councilor Niemeyer from Planning East by the Reich Ministry for Armaments and Munitions . Field work is scheduled to begin on 1 May 1943. The preparatory work has already started.

The aim was to systematize the plant society of Russia in relation to forests, grassland and arable weed societies. For this purpose, the entire staff of the department for theoretical and applied plant sociology of the veterinary university and the central office should be fully deployed.

There were also other tasks:

- Mapping of the water intake and abstraction area of the Hermann-Göring-Werke.
- Mapping of the flood area around Dessau.

The mappings in the forest area have been suspended. In 1943 the headquarters of the central office was relocated to Stolzenau an der Weser due to increasing air raids on Hannover. Tüxen's work in connection with the research squadron, e.g. V.This particular unit had the task of exploring hard-to-reach regions for troops in order to provide the military command with terrain information. The Central Office for Vegetation Mapping had the task of evaluating the aerial photographs obtained by the research team. For example, it was about assessing the extent to which a terrain is suitable for heavy armored vehicles, or about the possibility of military camouflage on site.

== After 1945 ==
After WWII the central office for the vegetation mapping of the Reich was transferred to the Federal Institute for Vegetation Mapping. In the immediate post-war period, Tüxen was able to fend off several attempts to close the facility with the help of foreign research colleagues and Tüxen remained its head until 1962, when the Federal Institute was transferred to the Federal Research Institute for Nature Conservation and Landscape Ecology.

In 1946, Tüxen re-founded the floristic-sociological working group in Lower Saxony, now under the name of the floristic-sociological working group, of which he remained chairman until 1971 and whose work he decisively determined. The working group became one of the largest botanical organizations in Germany, the consortium's communications have been published under the name Tuexenia since his death. Tüxen worked as an editor on the journal Vegetatio (today: Plant Ecology), which was founded in 1949.

From 1956 to 1958 Tüxen invited Japanese botanist and expert in plant ecology Akira Miyawaki to work at the Federal Institute for Vegetation Mapping with him on potential natural vegetation. Miyawaki returned to Japan in 1960. He applied the methods of mapping potential natural vegetation and found relicts of ancient forests still present in the vicinity of temples and shrines. Inventorying over 10,000 sites throughout Japan, he was able to identify potential flora affected by different types of human activity.

In 1964, Tüxen retired, but carried on plant sociological research in his new place of residence in the Rinteln district of Todenmann and remained in lively exchange with the international research community in this field. He died in 1980.

== Legacy ==
Tüxen's estate, which the state of Lower Saxony acquired after his death, is kept in the Institute for Geobotany at the Leibniz University Hannover. In particular, it includes around 25,000 partly handwritten and unpublished vegetation photographs from Tüxen and his staff. In 2003 these were digitized.

The Reinhold-Tüxen-Gesellschaft, the Reinhold-Tüxen-Preis of the city of Rinteln, the trade journal Tuexenia, as well as the Reinhold-und-Johanna-Tüxen-Stiftung are named after him.

In 2021, his work at Auschwitz has been criticized to exemplify the incidental juxtaposition of conservation and systematic extinction of human life.

== Honors ==
- 1954: Award of the Kiel Culture Prize
- 1959: Dr. hc University of Montpellier
- 1964: Federal Cross of Merit
- 1965: Dr. hc University of Lille
- 1975: Dr. hc University of Giessen
- 1976: Alexander von Humboldt Medal in gold
- 1977: Dr. hc Faculty of Biology at the University of Freiburg
- 1978: Lower Saxony Prize in the science category
- 1978: Dr. hc University of Toulouse
- 1979: Dr. hc University of Hannover
- 1979: Honorary citizenship of the city of Rinteln
- Honorary member of the Natural History Societies of Hannover
- Honorary member of the Royal Botanical Society of Belgium
- Honorary member of the Societas Botanica Cechoslovaca
