= Sonja Bernadotte =

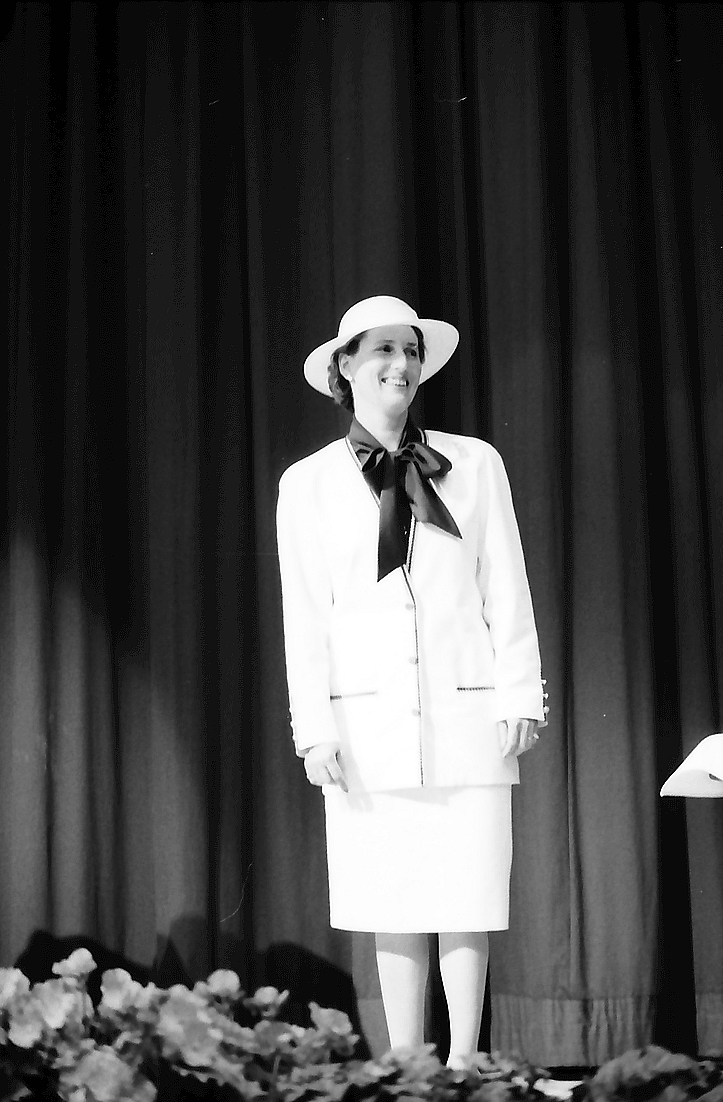
- Sonja Bernadotte in 1988
- Born: Sonja Anita Maria Haunz; 7 May 1944; Litzelstetten, Germany
- Died: 21 October 2008 (aged 64); Freiburg im Breisgau, Germany
- Title: Countess of Wisborg
- Spouse: Count Lennart Bernadotte of Wisborg (m. 1972; died 2004)
- Children: 5

Sonja Anita Maria Bernadotte, Countess of Wisborg (née Haunz; 7 May 1944 – 21 October 2008) was an estate manager and the second wife and widow of Count Lennart Bernadotte, son of Prince Wilhelm of Sweden.

== Biography ==
She managed the Mainau estate on Lake Constance in southern Germany which her husband purchased in 1951 from his father. The Mainau estate serves as Lake Constance's main tourist attraction, featuring elaborate floral gardens, a butterfly house, and attractive views of the lake. Bernadotte became the Count's second wife in 1972. After the death of the Count in 2004, Sonja Bernadotte became head of the foundation that organizes Nobel Laureate Meetings at Lindau, a scientific conference held yearly in Lindau, inviting Nobel prize winners interact with young researchers from all over the world.

== Marriage and family ==
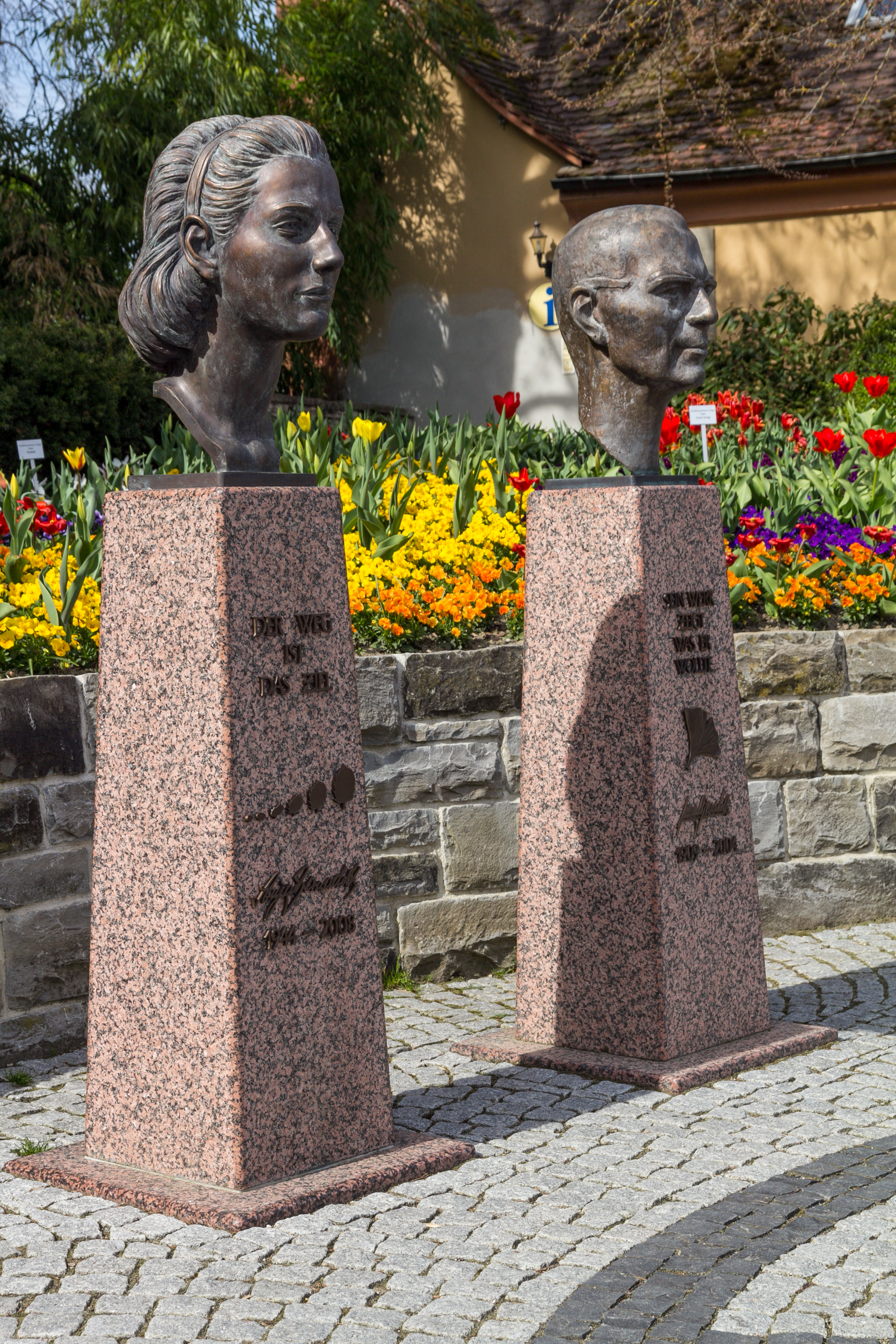
Busts of Sonja Bernadotte and her husband at Mainau

In 1969, Sonja met her future husband Count Lennart Bernadotte of Wisborg whilst she was working as his personal assistant. Lennart was thirty-five years older than Sonja, almost to the very day—their birthdays were only one day apart. Lennart was married and the father of four adult children. He divorced his wife of almost forty years, with whom his relations had been uneven for some years, in order to marry Sonja.

The wedding of Count Lennart and Countess Sonja took place on 29 April 1972. The couple had five children together.

According to her husband's memoirs Sonja Bernadotte would not allow anyone to address them as a prince or princess.

== Death ==
Sonja Bernadotte died of breast cancer in Freiburg im Breisgau, Germany, aged 64.
