= Lennart Bernadotte =

- Prince Bernadotte prev. Duke of Småland
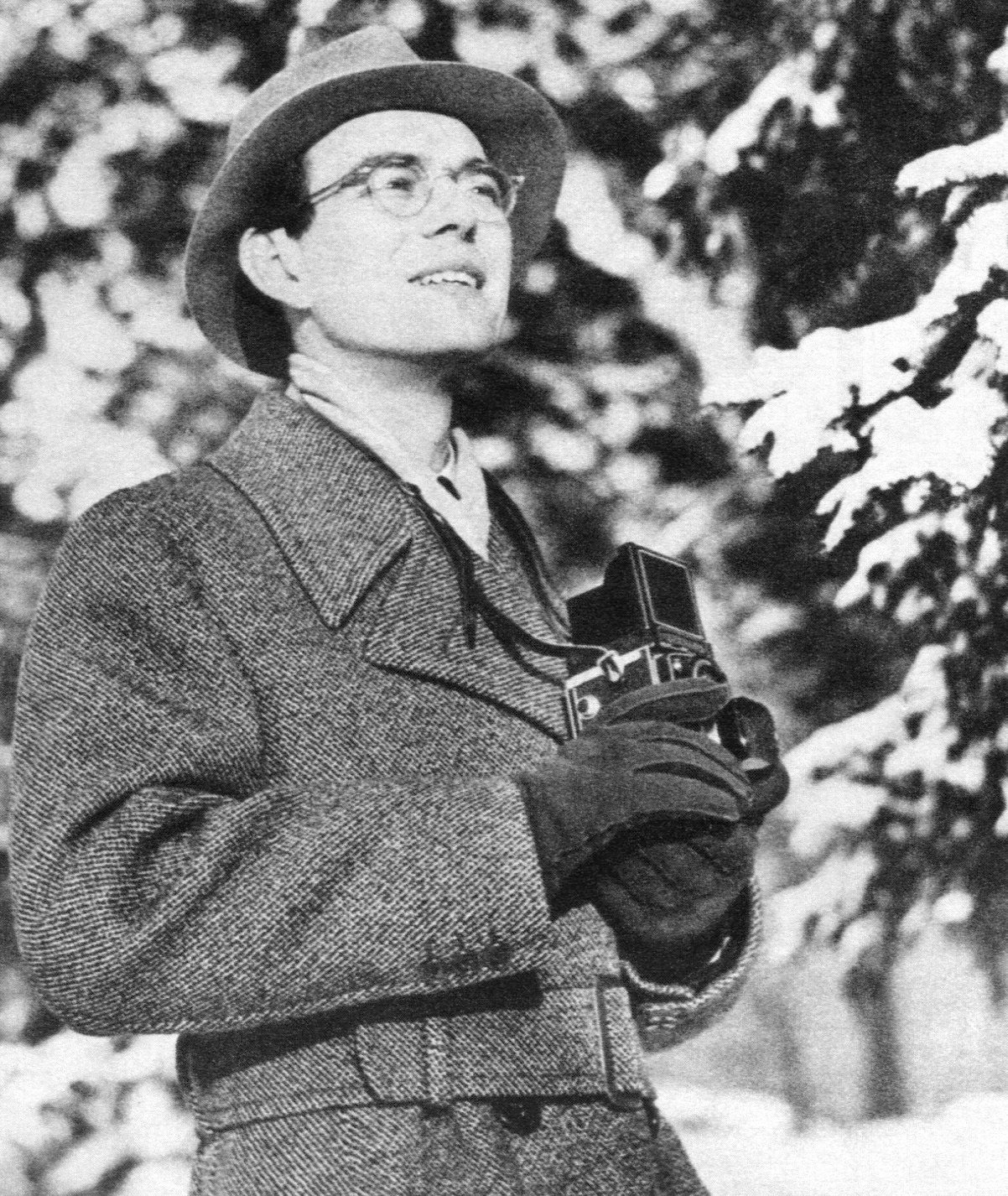
- Lennart Bernadotte in 1939
- Born: Prince Lennart of Sweden, Duke of Småland; 8 May 1909; Stockholm Palace, Stockholm, Sweden
- Died: 21 December 2004 (aged 95); Schloss Mainau, Mainau, Lake Constance, Germany
- Spouse: Karin Nissvandt (m. 1932; div. 1971) Sonja Haunz (m. 1972)
- Issue: Countess Birgitta; Countess Marie-Louise; Count Jan; Countess Cecilia; Countess Bettina; Count Björn; Countess Catharina; Count Christian; Countess Diana
Names
- Gustaf Lennart Nicolaus Paul
- House: Bernadotte
- Father: Prince Wilhelm, Duke of Södermanland
- Mother: Grand Duchess Maria Pavlovna of Russia
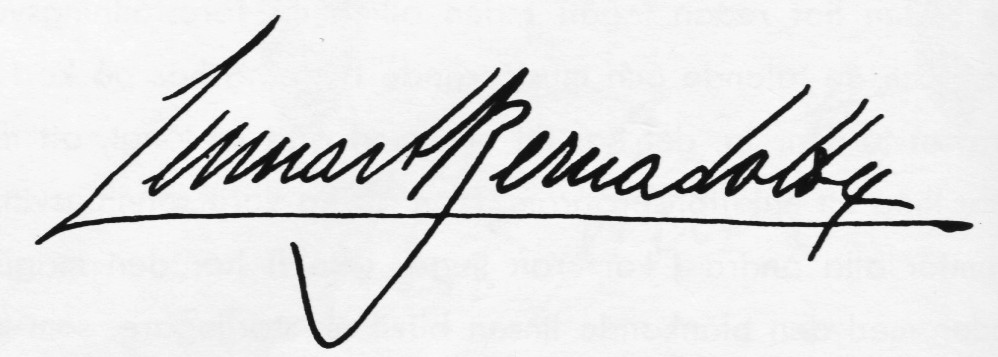
- Signature

Prince Lennart Bernadotte, Count of Wisborg (born Prince Lennart of Sweden, Duke of Småland; 8 May 1909 – 21 December 2004) was a Swedish-German landscaper, filmmaker, photographer and was a grandson of King Gustaf V of Sweden. He was also the eldest great-grandchild of King George I of Greece.

He was born at the Royal Palace in Stockholm, to Prince Wilhelm, Duke of Södermanland, and Grand Duchess Maria Pavlovna of Russia. At birth Bernadotte was a Swedish prince and was titled Duke of Småland. In 1932, he married Karin Nissvandt, an unequal marriage, and thereafter ceased to be a Swedish dynast. Thus, he was called Mr. Bernadotte as a result. Nineteen years after he lost his Swedish royal titles, he was given titles of nobility in Luxembourg.

He published two memoirs: Käre prins, godnatt (1977) and Mainau min medelpunkt (1995).

== Title ==
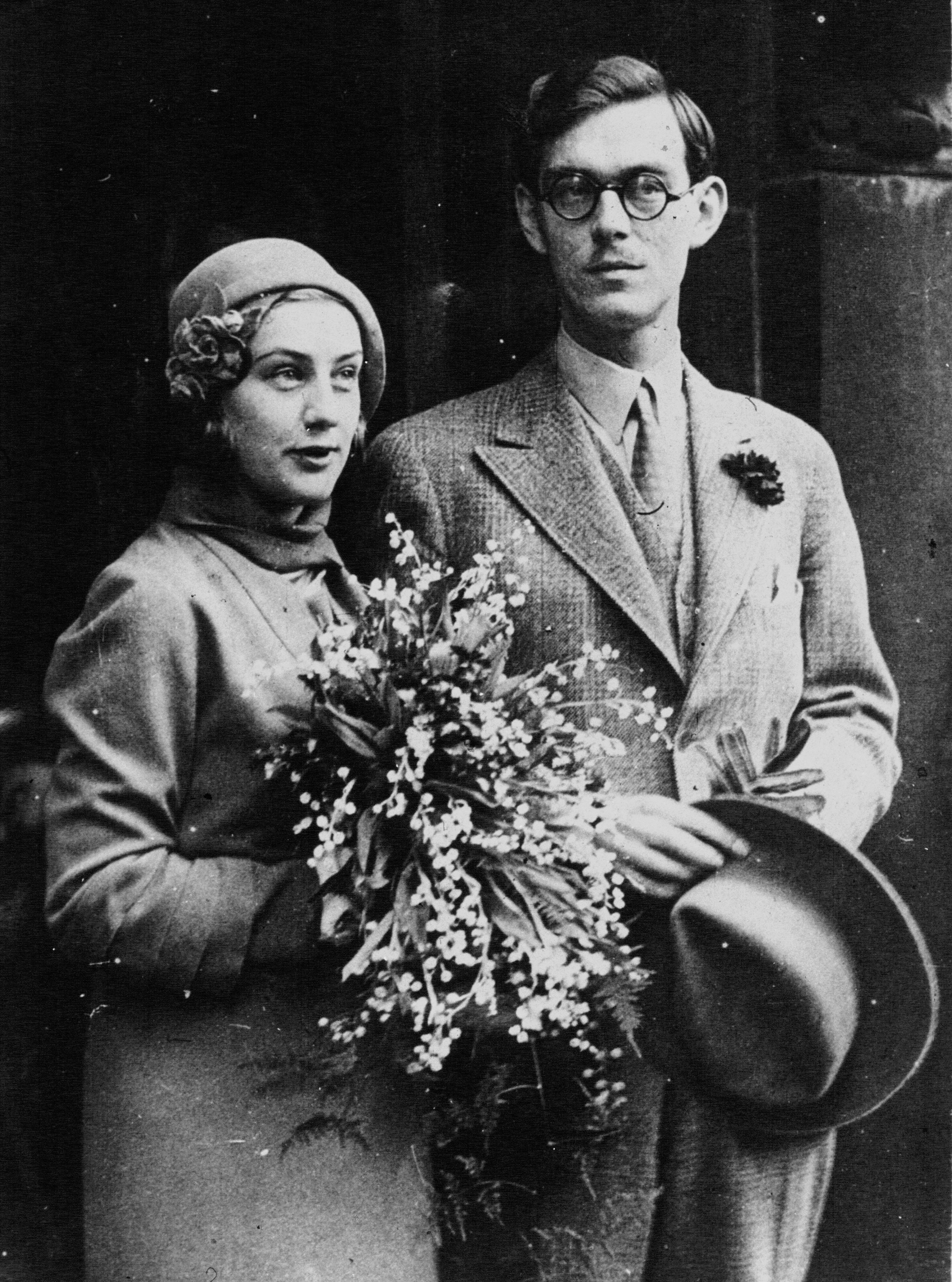
Lennart Bernadotte with his fiancée Karin Nissvandt (1911–1991) in 1932

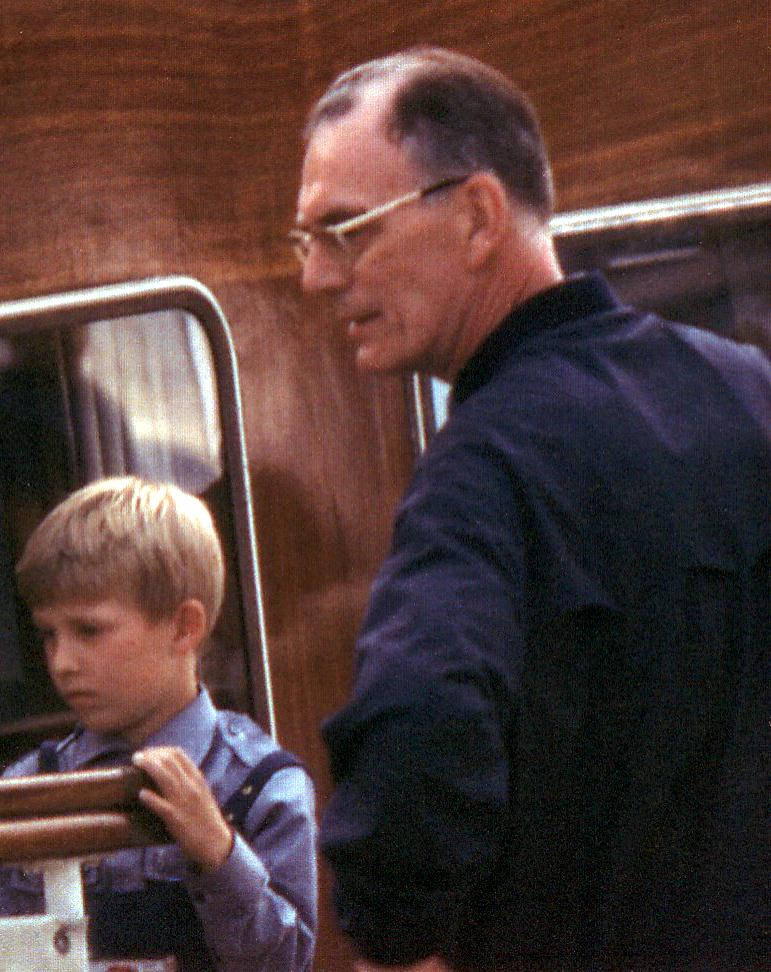
Bernadotte on his new yacht Stella Polaris at Gripsholm with grandson Friedrich Lennart Straehl, August 1965

Under the Swedish Act of Succession, a prince or princess marrying without the consent of the monarch and government forfeits the right of succession for themselves and their descendants. In a new policy adopted in the case of Lennart Bernadotte, they were also forbidden to use their titles and told to use the surname of Bernadotte. By his marriage on 11 March 1932 Prince Lennart consequently, as far as Swedish records were concerned, was to be called Mr. Lennart Bernadotte.

He considered himself for several decades subjected to very cruel treatment from the Royal Court of Sweden due to his first marriage, and his wife developed a worsening psychosis from it which eventually led to their divorce in 1971.

Beginning in 1892, Swedish princes who lost their succession rights received noble titles conferred by other reigning monarchs. On 2 July 1951, for himself, his wife and his marital descendants, Bernadotte was admitted by Grand Duchess Charlotte (head of state at the time) into the nobility of Luxembourg as Count of Wisborg and in that conferral was also called Gustaf Lennart Nicolas Paul Prince Bernadotte. Counts of Wisborg are considered to be part of the Swedish unintroduced nobility.

It has been reported (without accuracy) that Lennart and his cousin Sigvard Bernadotte wanted King Carl XVI Gustaf of Sweden to restore their royal titles, which he could have done, but that he chose not to do so; no such request was actually ever made however.

== Career ==
In 1944 Bernadotte portrayed the young Crown Prince Carl of Sweden and Norway in the historical film Prince Gustaf, Bernadotte's only screen acting role. He served as head of the Sveriges Scoutförbund (Scouting Association of Sweden) from 1948 to 1951

Lennart Bernadotte concentrated his energy on his estate on the island of Mainau in Lake Constance, Germany, where he died, and on his charitable fund, the Lennart Bernadotte Stiftung. He was considered a major gardening and landscaping talent and expert and turned his island into a popular tourist attraction.

He inspired the Green Charter of Mainau, which then became the template for the International Ski Federation's Mainau Forums and Mainau Manifesto's and the sports commitment to the environment and climate change.

He received the Eduard Rhein Ring of Honor from the German Eduard Rhein Foundation in 1996.

== Family ==
In London on 11 March 1932, Bernadotte married firstly Karin Emma Louise Nissvandt (7 July 1911 – 9 September 1991). They had four children before divorcing in December 1971: Birgitta (1933), Marie-Louise (1935–1988), Jan (1941–2021), and Cecilia (1944–2024).

In Mainau on 29 April 1972, Bernadotte married Sonja Anita Maria Haunz (7 May 1944 – 21 October 2008). They had five children: Bettina (1974), Björn (1975), Catherine (1977), Christian (1979), and Diana (1982).

Bernadotte died on 21 December 2004. His remains, and four years later those of his second wife, were interred in a crypt under the palace chapel on Mainau. His first wife's remains were buried in his father's grave in Flen.

== Honours and arms ==
=== Orders and decorations ===
- (Sweden) Knight of the Order of Charles XIII (8 May 1909)
- (Sweden) Commander Grand Cross of the Order of the Polar Star (10 April 1952)
- (Sweden) King Gustaf V's Jubilee Commemorative Medal (1928)
- (Sweden) King Gustaf V's Jubilee Commemorative Medal II (1948)
- (Sweden) Knight of the Order of Vasa

=== Arms ===
Lennart's coat of arms as prince of Sweden

Arms of the Counts of Wisborg

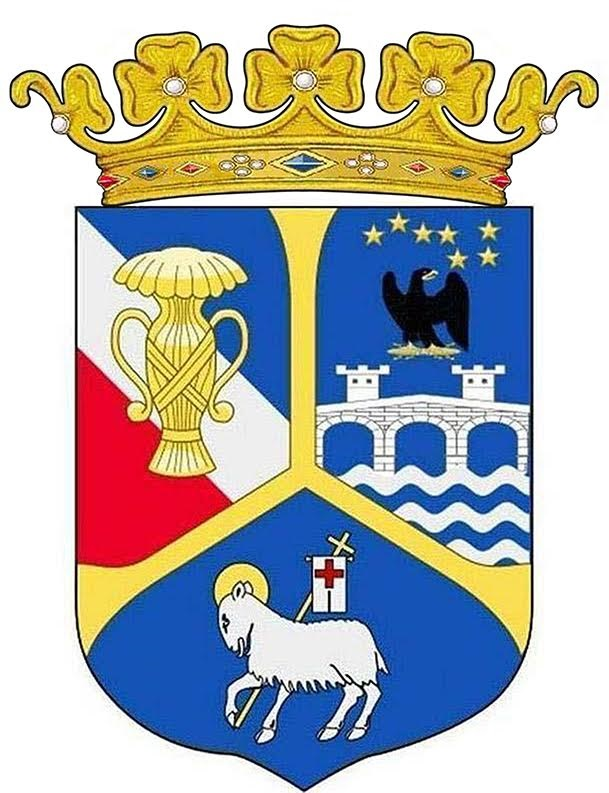
Arms as described by the Government of Luxembourg for Princes and Princesses Bernadotte in 1951

== Ancestry ==
Ancestors of Lennart Bernadotte

8. Oscar II of Sweden
4. Gustaf V of Sweden
9. Princess Sophia of Nassau
2. Prince Wilhelm, Duke of Södermanland
10. Frederick I, Grand Duke of Baden
5. Princess Victoria of Baden
11. Princess Louise of Prussia
1. Prince Lennart, Duke of Småland
12. Alexander II of Russia
6. Grand Duke Paul Alexandrovich of Russia
13. Princess Marie of Hesse and by Rhine
3. Grand Duchess Maria Pavlovna of Russia
14. George I of Greece
7. Princess Alexandra of Greece and Denmark
15. Grand Duchess Olga Constantinovna of Russia
