= Erich Oberdorfer =

German biologist

Erich Oberdorfer (26 March 1905 in Freiburg – 23 September 2002) was a German biologist specializing in phytosociology and phytogeography. His official botanical author abbreviation is "Oberd."

== Early life and education ==
Oberdorfer was born in Freiburg. After graduating from high school in 1923, he studied biological sciences at the University of Freiburg and University of Tübingen. In Freiburg he heard lectures from Hans Spemann and Friedrich Oltmann, among others. In addition to Felix Rawitscher, Walter Zimmermann, who was assistant to Friedrich Oltmanns at the time, was one of his teachers. He graduated in Freiburg in 1928 with a doctorate which he wrote under the direction of Friedrich Oltmanns and the ecophysiologist Bruno Huber, about the relationship between the places where different algae grew on the rock faces of the Überlinger See and the light conditions at different depths.

== Career ==
Oberdorfer initially did not get a job as a teacher because of the economic upheaval in Germany at that time. He was entrusted with a research project on the late and post-Ice Age deposits in the Feldmoos on Schluchsee. This work was supported by the Notgemeinschaft der Deutschen Wissenschaft, a forerunner organization of the German Research Foundation, and was undertaken, among other things, because the Schluchsee was to be dammed up to generate electricity. The field moss was to be carefully examined again before it disappeared. Oberdorfer mainly examined the large remains, which he took from depths of up to seven meters using soil auger, and established pollen profiles of the different layers. Among other things, he was able to prove that during the Late Ice Age of the Black Forest the white silver arum Dryas octopetala and the dwarf birch Betula nana as well as several willow species (Salix herbacea, Salix reticulata or Salix myrtilloides) occurred. With his research results, evidence for the climatic fluctuations of the Late Ice Age was available for the Black Forest for the first time. He continued this work during his later position as a teacher until 1939, and became one of the pioneers in the field of pollen analysis in Central Europe.

Oberdorfer dealt with various, then new methods of descriptive vegetation science. He learnt to know the plant-sociological method according to Josias Braun-Blanquet through Hermann Otto Sleumer and soon had contact with Braun-Blanquet himself, Reinhold Tüxen and Walo Koch.

In 1931 Oberdorfer his first job as a teacher and taught first in Weinheim, then in Bruchsal and Karlsruhe at the grammar school biology and geography. In addition, he also mapped the area around Bruchsal using the Braun-Blanquet method. The result was the Bruchsal vegetation map on a scale of 1: 25,000 in 1936. With this, he had created the second vegetation map with this scale. In 1938 the sheet Bühlertal - Hornisgrinde was to appear, as early as 1937 he had published a vegetation map of Baden 1: 1,000,000.

In 1937 Oberdorfer was transferred to Karlsruhe, where he initially received half a deputation as a teacher and a position at the Baden Nature Conservation Agency in Karlsruhe under its director Hermann Schurhammer. In 1938, he left school teaching entirely and received a full-time position as a conservator. In doing so, he had to write reports and descriptions of the nature reserves between Lake Constance and the Tauber area, and his trips made him a profound expert on the vegetation of what was then Baden. Work on the plant communities of the Rhine plain, the Black Forest and the Kraichgau later flowed alongside explorations in the Allgäu and in the Alps in his overview of the southern German plant communities, published in the first edition in 1957, in which he also summarized the vegetation recordings of numerous other plant sociologists. The work appeared in a new edition between 1977 and 1992. With this book, Oberdorfer also significantly shaped the plant-sociological nomenclature not only of southern Germany, but of all of Central Europe.

=== World War II ===
Oberdorfer was a member of the SA and the NSDAP. He had experience with the vegetation of Southeastern Europe as a botanist at the "Research Season zbV" where the Lieutenant Schulz-Kampfhenkel used and mapped including in Thessaly, Macedonia, Albania, and Thrace, where he made with colleagues phytosociological recordings and auswertete soil profiles. With studies of the vegetation of northern Spain and a research trip to Chile from 1957 to 1958, he rounded off his knowledge of vegetation outside of Central Europe.

=== After 1945 ===
After the end of the war Oberdorfer was initially only given occasional jobs due to his membership of the SA and the NSDAP, for example as a research assistant to Heinrich Walter at the University of Hohenheim. Starting 1947, Oberdorfer was employed as a curator at the newly established state agency for nature conservation in North Baden (since 1952 District Office for Nature Conservation and Landscape Management, North Baden) and was its director until 1958. In addition, in 1947 he was also head of the regional collections for natural history in Karlsruhe. After an official director's position was created in 1958 Oberdorfer held this position until his retirement in 1970. From 1950 Oberdorfer held a teaching position for plant-sociological site studies at the Forestry Faculty of the University of Freiburg and was appointed honorary professor there in 1962.

While Oberdorfer's work South German Plant Societies is only known to experts in plant sociology, his plant sociological excursion flora became famous among field botanists. It is the only standard flora in Central Europe that gives detailed ecological information on the species. "Der Oberdorfer" was first published in 1949. In 2001 Oberdorfer published the 8th edition of Flora together with Theo Müller and Angelika Schwabe. With this work, Oberdorfer has made a significant contribution to the shift in field botany from pure floristry to a site-ecological consideration of the vegetation.

== Honors ==
- 1973: Honorary member of the Badisches Landesverein für Naturkunde und Naturschutz
- 1978: Honorary doctorate from the Technical University of Munich
- 1978: Merit Medal of the State of Baden-Württemberg
- 1989: Reinhold Tüxen Prize

== Work ==
- Plant-sociological excursion flora for south-west Germany and the adjacent areas, Stuttgart / Ludwigsburg 1949 (later expanded several times and reissued; 8th edition, heavily revised and supplemented together with other authors, under the title Plant-sociological excursion flora for Germany and neighboring areas, Ulmer, Stuttgart 2001, ISBN 978-3-8001-3131-0 ).
- Plant sociological studies in Chile = Estudios fitosociológicos en Chile y comparación con la vegetación europea. A comparison with Europe, Flora et vegetatio mundi (Volume 2), Weinheim 1960

together with Theo Müller and Georg Philippi: The potential natural vegetation of Baden-Württemberg, publications by the State Agency for Nature Conservation and Landscape Management Baden-Württemberg (Supplement 6), Ludwigsburg 1974 as co-author: Der Hohe Schwarzwald, Freiburg im Breisgau 1980, ISBN 3-7930-0250-0.

- South German Plant Societies, Plant Sociology (Volume 10), Jena 1957 (later expanded by him and other authors and reissued several times, most recently as South German Plant Societies, 4 parts in 5 volumes, Spektrum Verlag, 1992, ISBN 3-8274-0630-7.)
- Memoirs of the plant sociologist EO, Jena and Stuttgart 1995, ISBN 3-334-61004-7.

See also: Forest societies of Central Europe, plant sociological units according to Oberdorfer

== Bibliography ==
- Erwin Jörg (Red.) Et al.: Festschrift for the 70th birthday of Erich Oberdorfer. Dedicated by his friends and students. Contributions to natural history research in southwest Germany, Volume 34. Edited by the State Collections for Natural History Karlsruhe in conjunction with the District Office for *Nature Conservation and Landscape Management Karlsruhe and the Natural Science Association Karlsruhe eV State Collections for Natural History, Karlsruhe 1975, 476 pp.
- Joachim Schönherr: 50th anniversary of Prof. Erich Oberdorfer's doctorate. In: General forest and hunting newspaper. 149th year 1978, ISSN 0002-5852, pp. 175–176
- Collective of authors: Festschrift Prof. Dr. Dr. hc Erich Oberdorfer. For his 80th birthday on 26 March 1985. Tuexenia, NS, No. 5. Floristic-Sociological Working Group 1985, 569 pp.
- Angelika Schwabe: The work of Erich Oberdorfer as the basis for plant-sociological-systematic and nature conservation-related studies, shown using examples from the Black Forest. Communications from the Baden Regional Association for Natural History and Nature Conservation NF 14: 43–71. 1986.
- Dieter Knoch : Erich Oberdorfer on his 80th birthday. Announcements from the Badisches Landesverein für Naturkunde und Naturschutz NF 14: 13–16. 1986.
- Siegfried Rietschel (Ed.): Festband Erich Oberdorfer. Carolinea ... (Volume 53). State Museum for Natural History Karlsruhe, Karlsruhe 1995, 288 pp.
- University of Freiburg (Ed.): Erich Oberdorfer in memory. Freiburg University Gazette 41/158: 145–146. 2002.
- Angelika Schwabe and Theo Müller: Erich Oberdorfer (1905–2002). Tuexenis NS 23: 3–8. 2008.
- Otti Wilmanns : Erich Oberdorfer †: 1905–2002. Phytocoenologia 33: 1-12. 2003
- Volkmar Wirth and Georg Philippi: Prof. Dr. Dr. hc Erich Oberdorfer †. Carolinea 61: 229–234. 2003
- Bärbel Häcker: Erich Oberdorfer. Portrait. In: 50 years of nature conservation history in Baden-Württemberg. Stuttgart 2004, ISBN 3-8001-4472-7 , pp. 260/261.
- Georg Philippi: Erich Oberdorfer 1905–2002. Communications from the Baden Regional Association for Natural History and Nature Conservation NF 18: 305–308. 2002/2004
- Wolfgang Haber: In memory of Erich Oberdorfer: 1905–2002. Reports of the Bavarian Botanical Society 73/47: 177. 2004.
