= Mainau =

Inland island in Germany

Nickname: Blumeninsel (flower island)
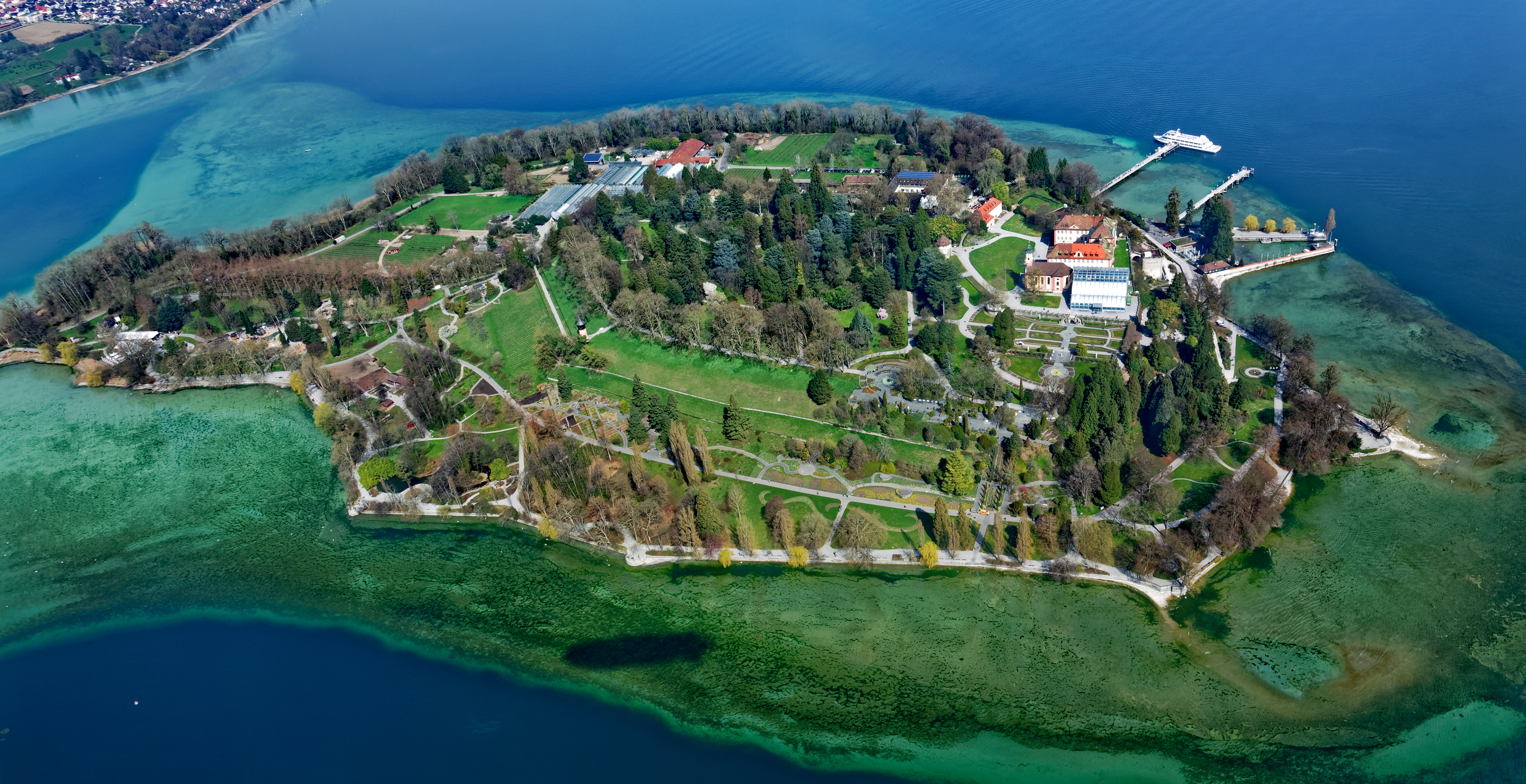
- Aerial view

- Location within Germany

Geography
- Location: Lake Constance
- Coordinates: 47°42′20″N 9°11′40″E
- Area: 0.447584 km^{2} (0.172813 sq mi)
- Length: 1.1 km (0.68 mi)
- Width: 0.61 km (0.379 mi)
- Coastline: 3.2 km (1.99 mi)
- Highest elevation: 425 m (1394 ft)
- Highest point: Schloßhügel

Administration
- Germany
- State: Baden-Württemberg
- District: Konstanz
- Municipality: Konstanz
- Ward: Litzelstetten

Demographics
- Population: 185 (2008)
- Pop. density: 413.3/km^{2} (1070.4/sq mi)

Additional information
- Official website: www.mainau.de
- Private property owned by Lennart Bernadotte-Stiftung

Mainau (2010)

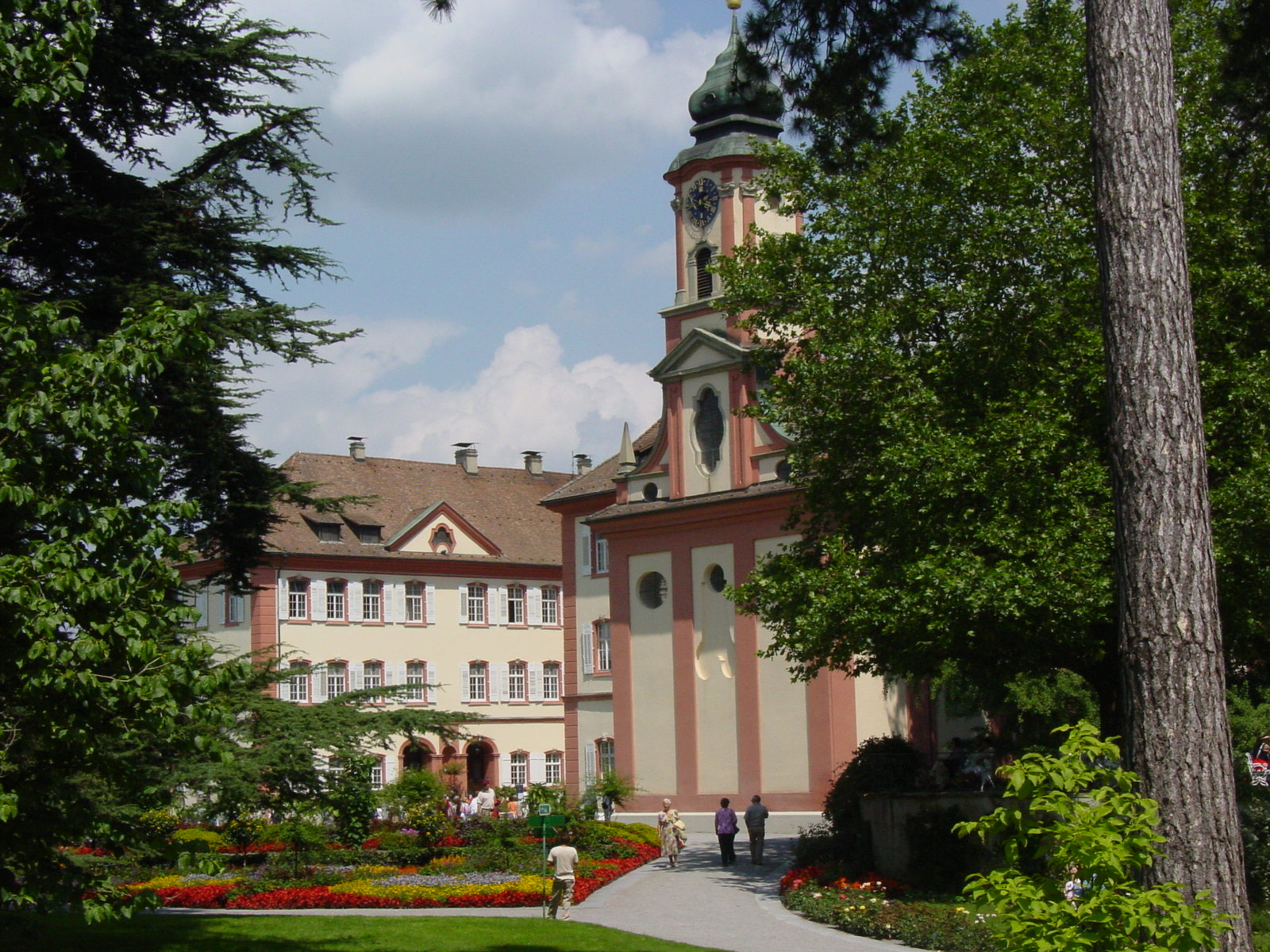
The palace gardens at Mainau were mainly created by Lennart Bernadotte

Mainau (Note: Also historically referred to as Mav(e)no(w), Maienowe (1242), Maienow (1357), Maienau, Mainowe (1394) and Mainaw (1580).) (German pronunciation: [ˈmaɪnaʊ]) is a German island in Lake Constance. It is on the southern shore of Lake Überlingen, near the city of Konstanz, Baden-Württemberg. It is maintained as a garden island and a model of excellent environmental practices. Administratively, the island has been a part of Konstanz since December 1, 1971, when the municipality of Litzelstetten, of which Mainau was part, was incorporated into it. Mainau is still part of Litzelstetten, now one of 15 wards of Konstanz.

The island belongs to the Lennart Bernadotte-Stiftung (Lennart Bernadotte Foundation), an entity created by Prince Lennart Bernadotte, Count of Wisborg, originally a Prince of Sweden and Duke of Småland. It is one of the main tourist attractions of Lake Constance. Beside flowers there is a park landscape with views on the lake. There is also a greenhouse with a tropical climate and thousands of butterflies.

Mainau Bay is the location of their university's sailing club.

== Geography ==
=== Position ===
The island averages out at a height between 395 metres (1,296 ft) (roughly equals the lake’s average medium water-level) and 425 meters (1,394 ft) above sea level. Its highest peak is located at the Großherzog-Friedrich Terrace (historic water reservoir). Mainau Island is 610 metres (2,000 ft) long from North to South and a 1,050 meters (3,440 ft) wide from West to East. The island’s circumference is about three kilometers (1.9 mi). The shortest distance between the downwelling molasse slice and the lake’s shore is about 130 meters (430 ft).

=== Population ===
Few people inhabit Mainau Island. Due to its small number of inhabitants, it is considered a hamlet. Meyer’s Lexikon’s issue of 1888 declared that 28 people lived on Mainau Island. During the census of 1961, a population of 123 was verified. Count Björn Bernadotte is living in the castle on Mainau Island.

=== Flora and fauna ===
Due to subtropical influences, Mainau features an almost year round warm climate, that allows the cultivation of exotic trees like banana trees or many kinds of palm trees.

Besides this subtropical vegetation, Mainau is also home to many topical Central European trees like the lind.

The cultivation of the gardens has a long history in Mainau and attract thousands of tourists from all over the world each year.

== Parks and gardens ==
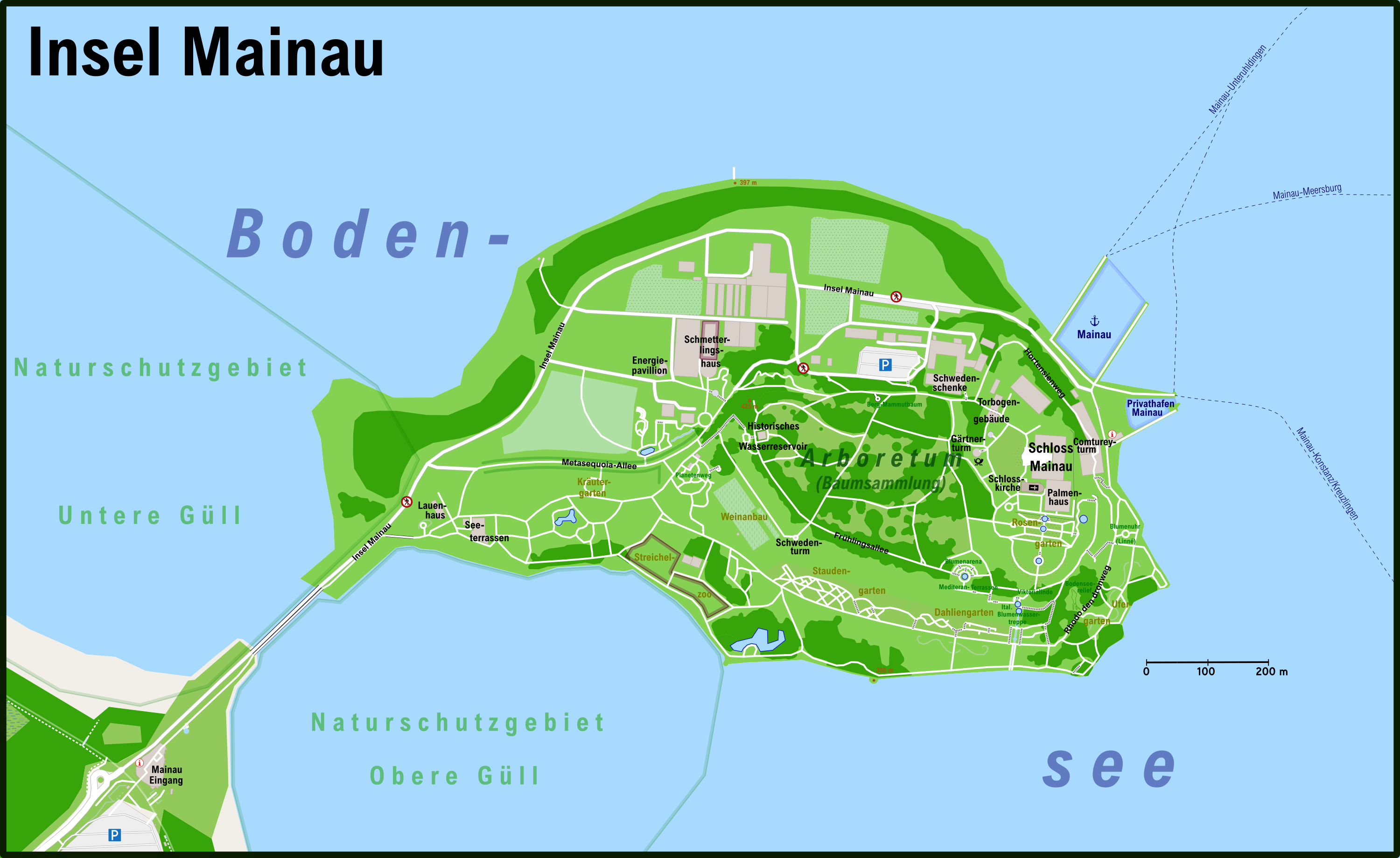
Island map

Mainau Island is a "flowering island" notable for its parks and gardens. Frederick I, Grand Duke of Baden, created the island's arboretum, which now contains 500 species of deciduous and coniferous trees, many exotic and valuable, including fine specimens of Sequoiadendron giganteum (1864) and Metasequoia glyptostroboides (1952). The island also contains about 200 rhododendron and azalea varieties.

Due to the advantageous climate at the lake, palm trees and other Mediterranean plants can grow on the drop-shaped island. Because of its rich subtropical and partly even tropical vegetation, Mainau Island is also called "flowering island in the Lake Constance". Count Lennart Bernadotte, who died in 2004, liked to call his island "Blumenschiff" (engl. flower ship). He also described the famous destination as follows: "She is a coquettish little Lady, Mainau Island, who constantly demands much attention, even more love and ceaselessly new clothes." - Lennart Bernadotte. By "new clothes", he probably meant the blossoms, plants and flower-beds which are constantly renewed by the gardeners.

Apart from the historic buildings, the centerpiece of Mainau Island is the Arboretum with its 500 different types of rare and valuable broad-leaved trees and conifers, which was created in 1856 by grand duke Friedrich I. Among those is one of Germany's "oldest" dawn redwood trees (Metasequoia glyptostroboides). The tree, which originated from China, was planted on the island in 1952, when it was just 70 centimeters (28 in) tall. Particularly mighty are some exemplars of the giant redwood (Sequoiadendron giganteum). Their seeds came from California in 1853 and were planted on the island in 1864, which makes them one of the oldest of their kind in Europe. You can find the above-mentioned giant redwoods as well as Cedars, Dawn Redwoods and Tulip Poplars on the island. The Arboretum expands towards the north-west of the island.

Spring marks the beginning of the "Blumenjahr" (eng. Flower Year) with an exhibition of orchids. From March to May you can see several types of flowers in full bloom, like Tulips, Daffodils, Primroses, Forget-Me-Nots and Hyacinths. To show the full beauty of all these flowers the so-called „Frühlingsallee“ (eng. Spring Avenue) was opened, which is a path across the island surrounded by beds of these plants. From May to June over 200 kinds of Rhododendrons and Azaleas are in full bloom. To the west of the "Comturey-Keller" you can find an Italian rose garden commissioned by Friedrich I. This rose garden is strictly geometric and consists of pergolas, sculptures and fountains. In general, over 1200 kinds of roses can be found on the island.

„Frühlingsallee“ leads to „Mediterran-Terrassen“ (eng. Mediterranean Terrace) where exotic plants such as palm families, agaves, cacti and bougainvillea are presented in pails during summer. Lake Constance and its surroundings as well as the Alps can be seen in a panoramic view from here. In July the blossoms of brugmansia and hibiscus are blooming on Mainau Island and in August the blossoms of passion flowers bloom.

On the southern end you can find “Südgarten” (eng. South Garden) where in autumn fields of dahlia with approximately 20,000 dahlia bushes and 250 varieties gleam from September until October. Spring and summer flowers such as different kinds of fuchsia are growing on the affiliated shore garden to the eastern side of “Südgarten”.

The “Bodenseerelief” (eng. Relief of Lake Constance) is a very popular photo motive. It is a relief with the picture of a flower which is changed by season. A small harbor with a landing place is situated to the northern side of Mainau Island. Excursion boats lay in here and another entrance to “Frühlingsallee” can be found here.

== History ==
=== Pre- and early history ===
In 1862, signs of an earlier population were discovered along the south banks of Mainau and soon exploited by domain administrator Walter: among the items were wedges, a potsherd, flint splinters, an axe and a muller. The pile dwelling settlement made up of six houses was uncovered in the 1930s and dated back to the Neolithic Age (3,000 b.c.). Lake-dwelling settlements of the Neolithic and the Bronze Age were located along the northern shore and the southwestern island along the shallow water zone.

=== Contemporary history ===
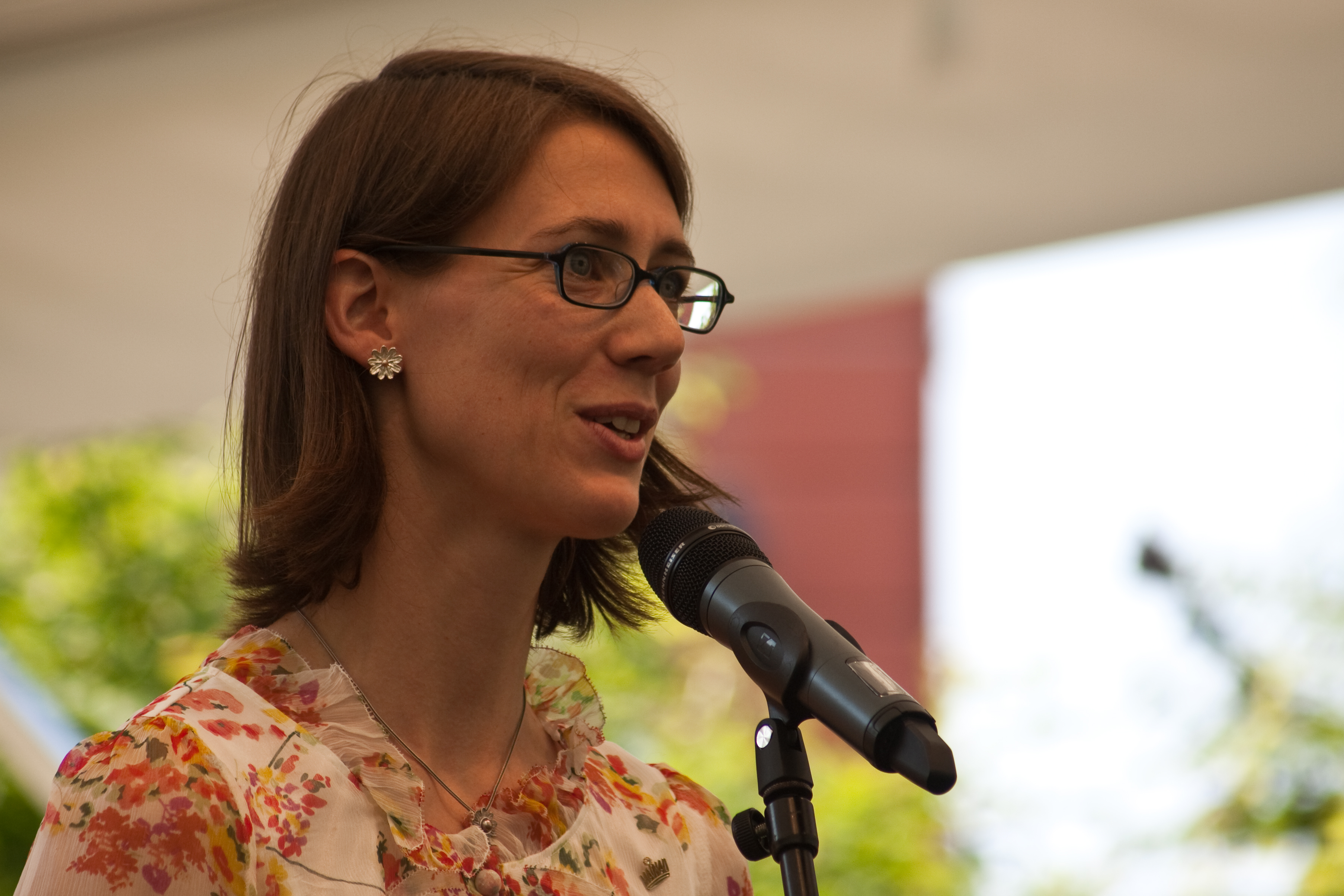
Countess Bettina Bernadotte in Mainau in 2010, on the occasion of the 2010 Lindau Nobel Laureate Meeting

Until the Napoleonic mediatisations and secularisations of small German fiefs this island belonged to the Order of Teutonic Knights. It was later sold into private ownership. In 1853 Grand Duke Frederick I of Baden purchased the island as his personal property and used the palace built by the Teutonic Knights as summer palace. At the end of World War I Baden became a republic with the abdication of Grand Duke Frederick II, son of Frederick I. The former Grand Duke retained his private property including Mainau. When he died childless in 1928 the island passed to his sister Victoria of Baden, wife of King Gustaf V of Sweden. Upon her death two years later she bequeathed the island to her second son Prince Wilhelm, Duke of Södermanland and his descendants. In 1932 Prince Wilhem gave Mainau to his only child Lennart Bernadotte who owned it until 1974 when he transferred the island to a foundation. Count Bernadotte formed Enterprise Mainau GmbH in 1991 as a private enterprise to manage the island for the benefit of the Lennart Bernadotte-Stiftung. The Count remained active in managing Mainau until his death in 2004 but had appointed his second wife Sonja co-manager in 2001. Widowed, she and their children ran both the foundation and the management company until 2007. Since January 2007 Bettina Bernadotte, the eldest daughter of Lennart and Sonja, directs the Mainau GmbH as current manager, and since 2011 her brother Björn Bernadotte has joined her.

== Gallery ==
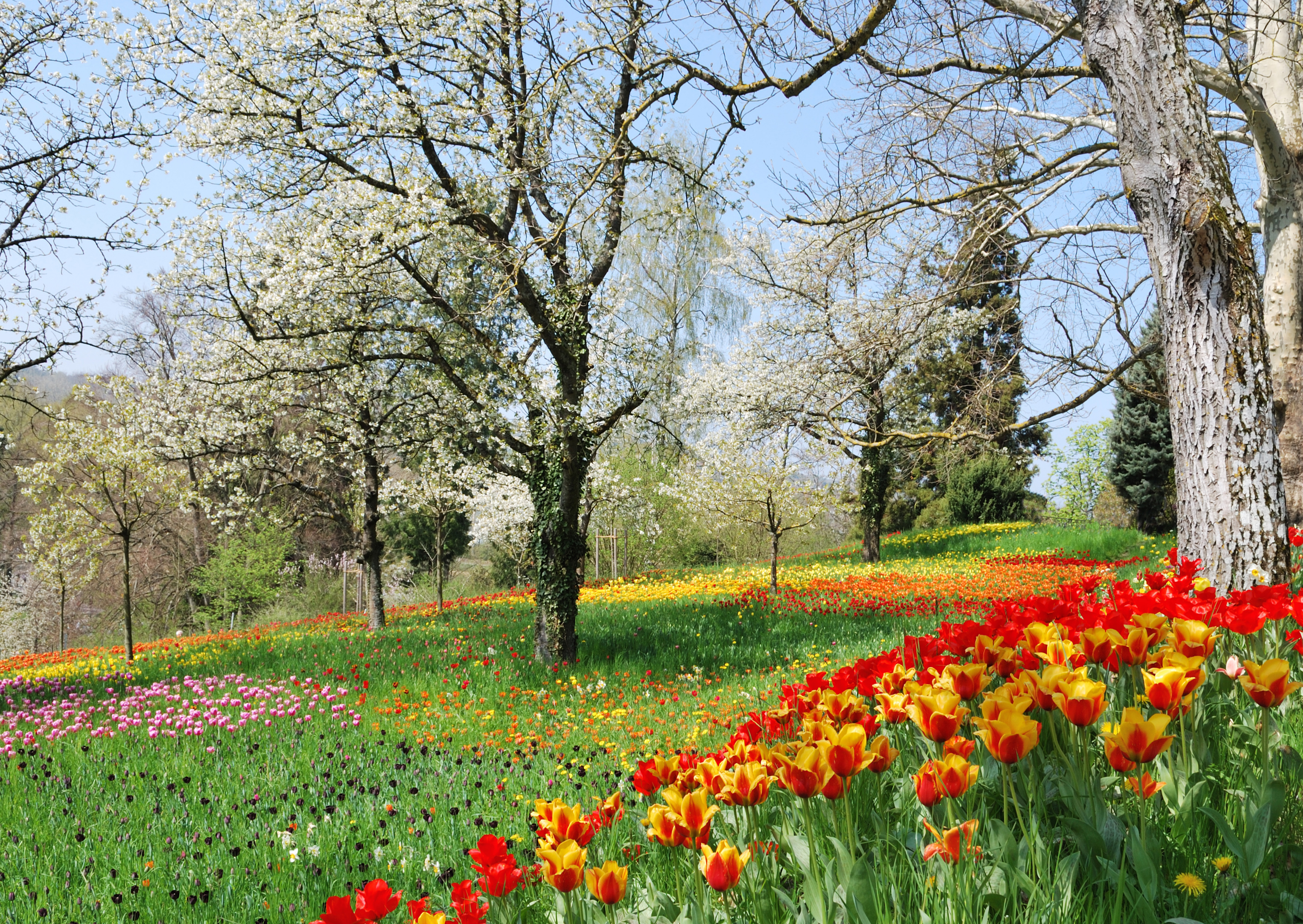

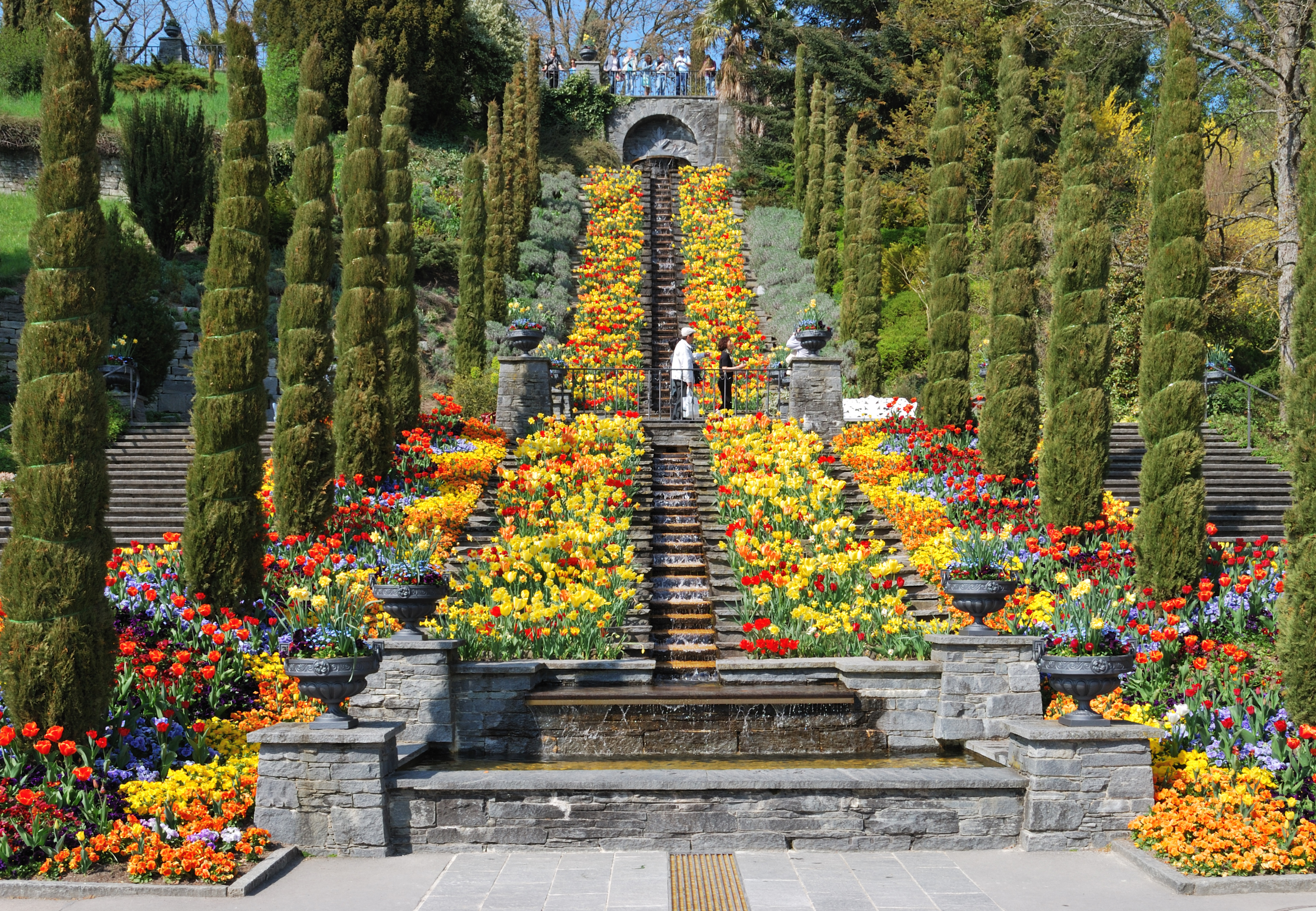

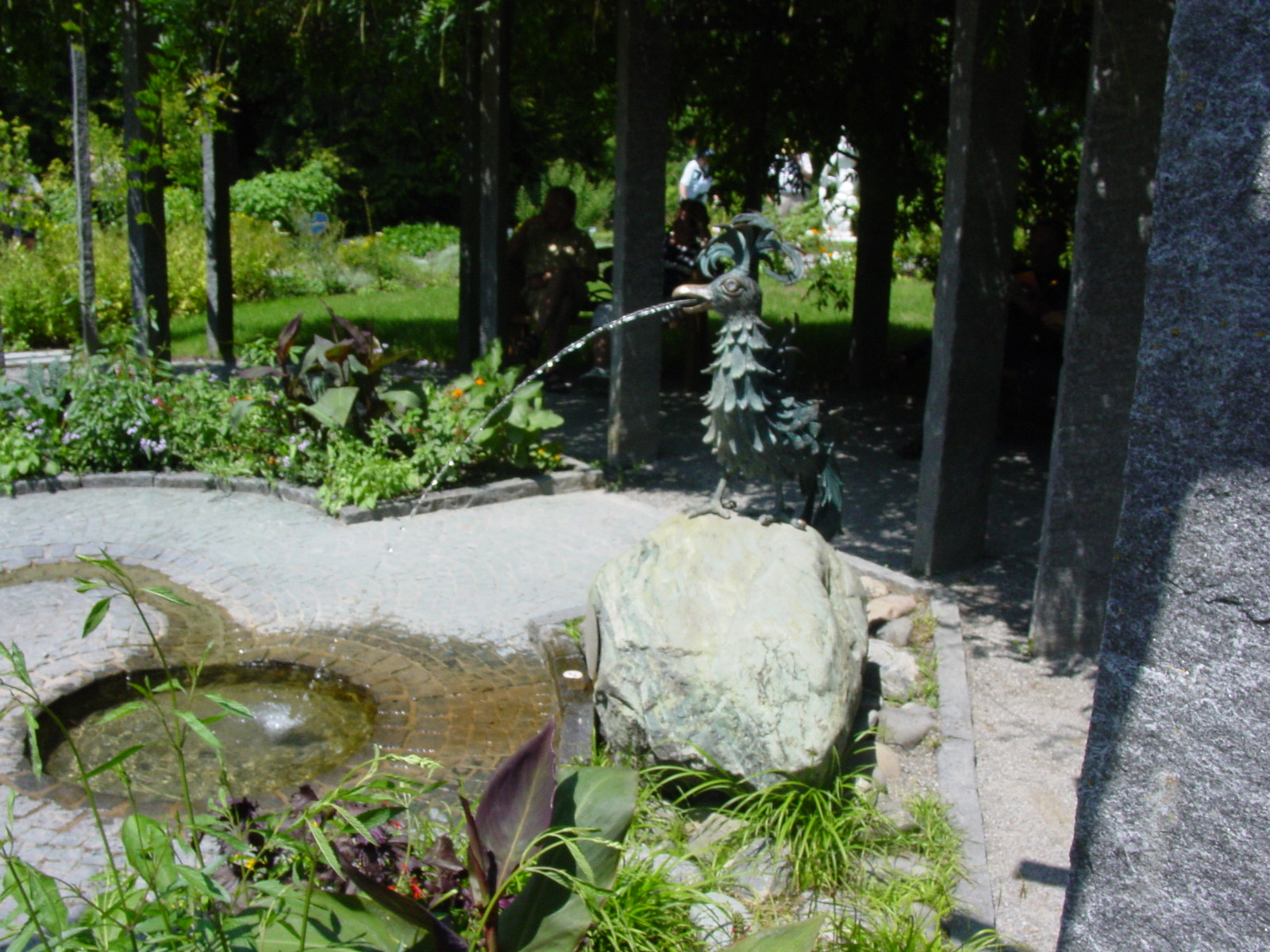

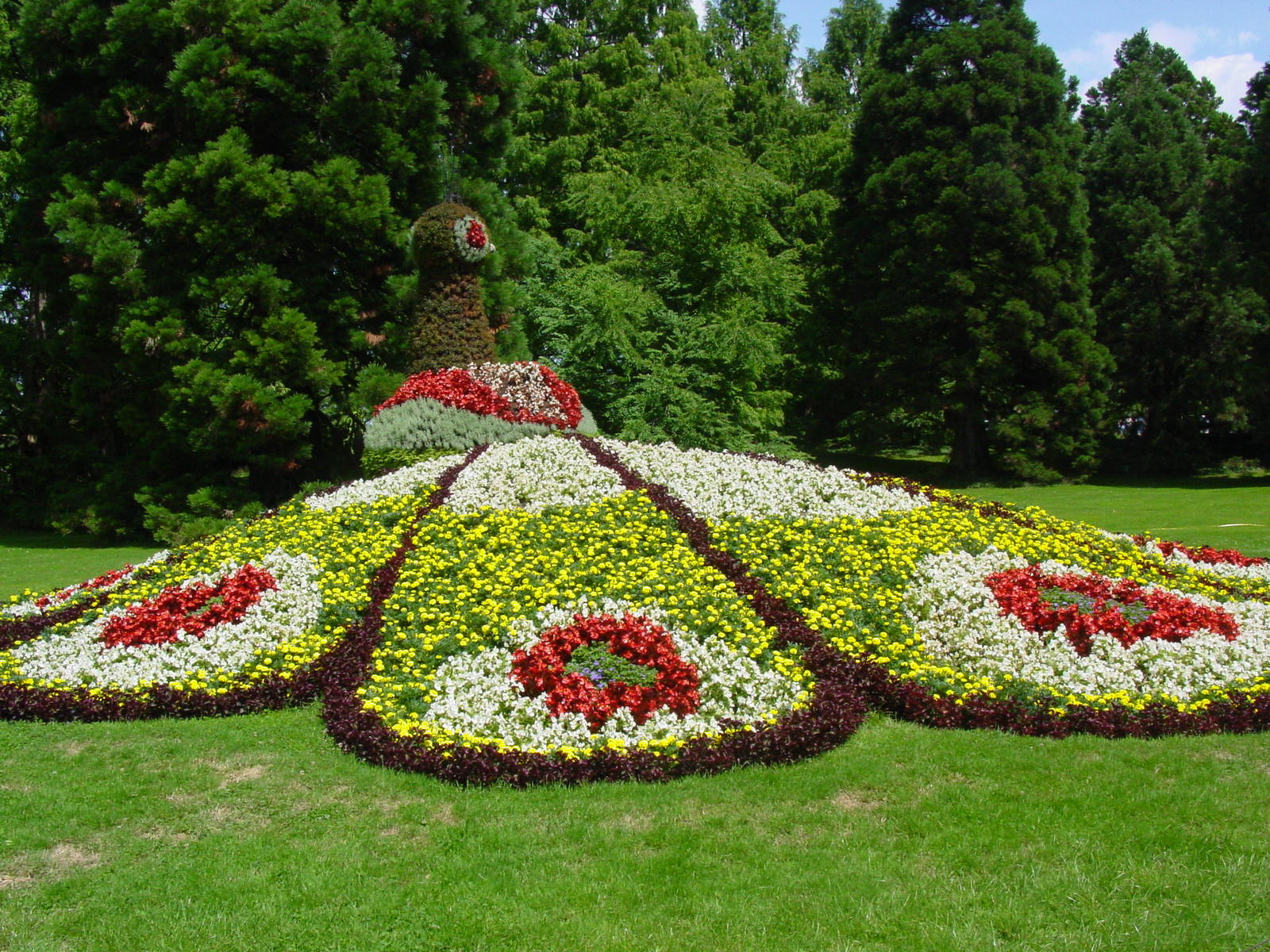

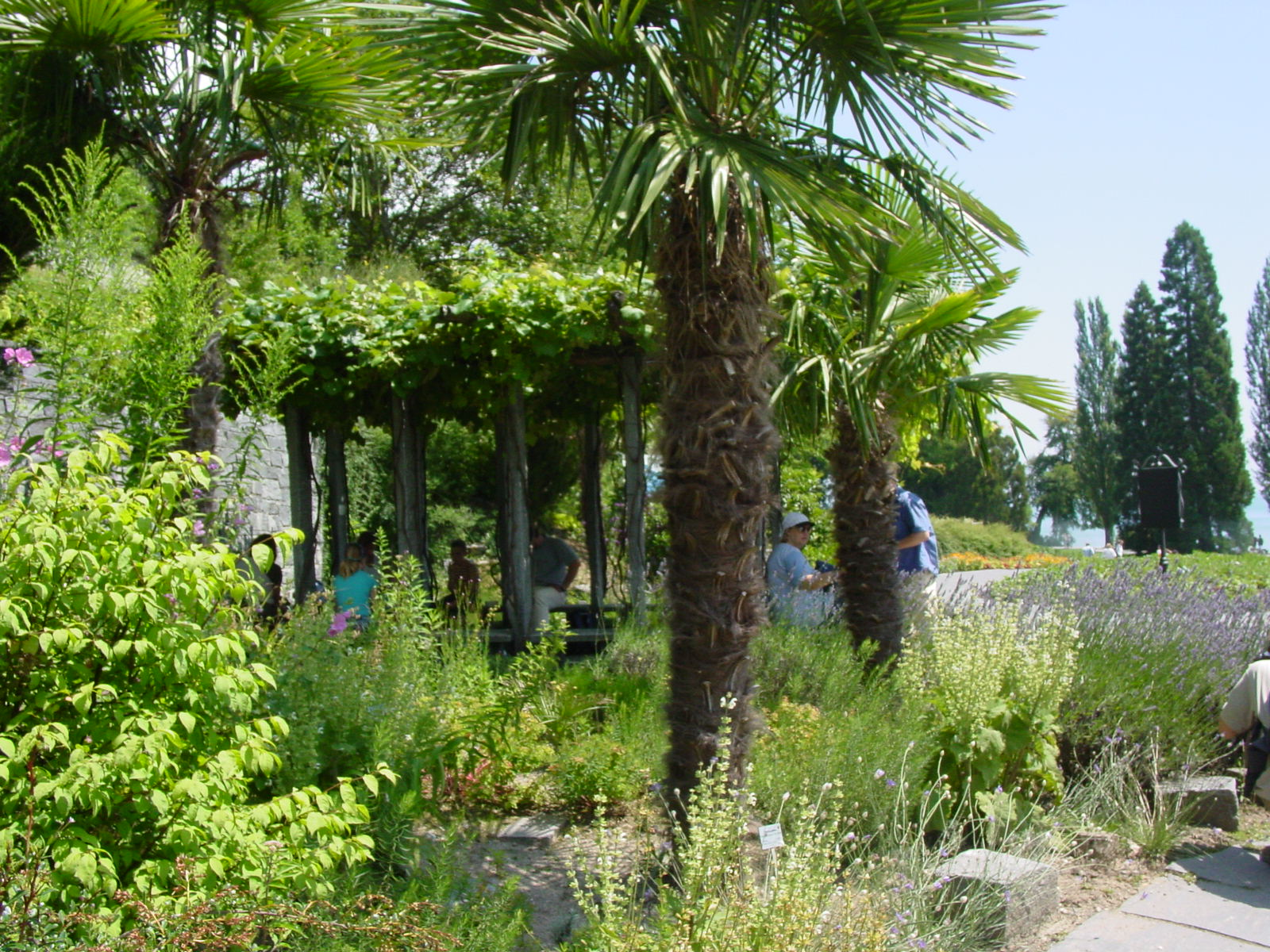

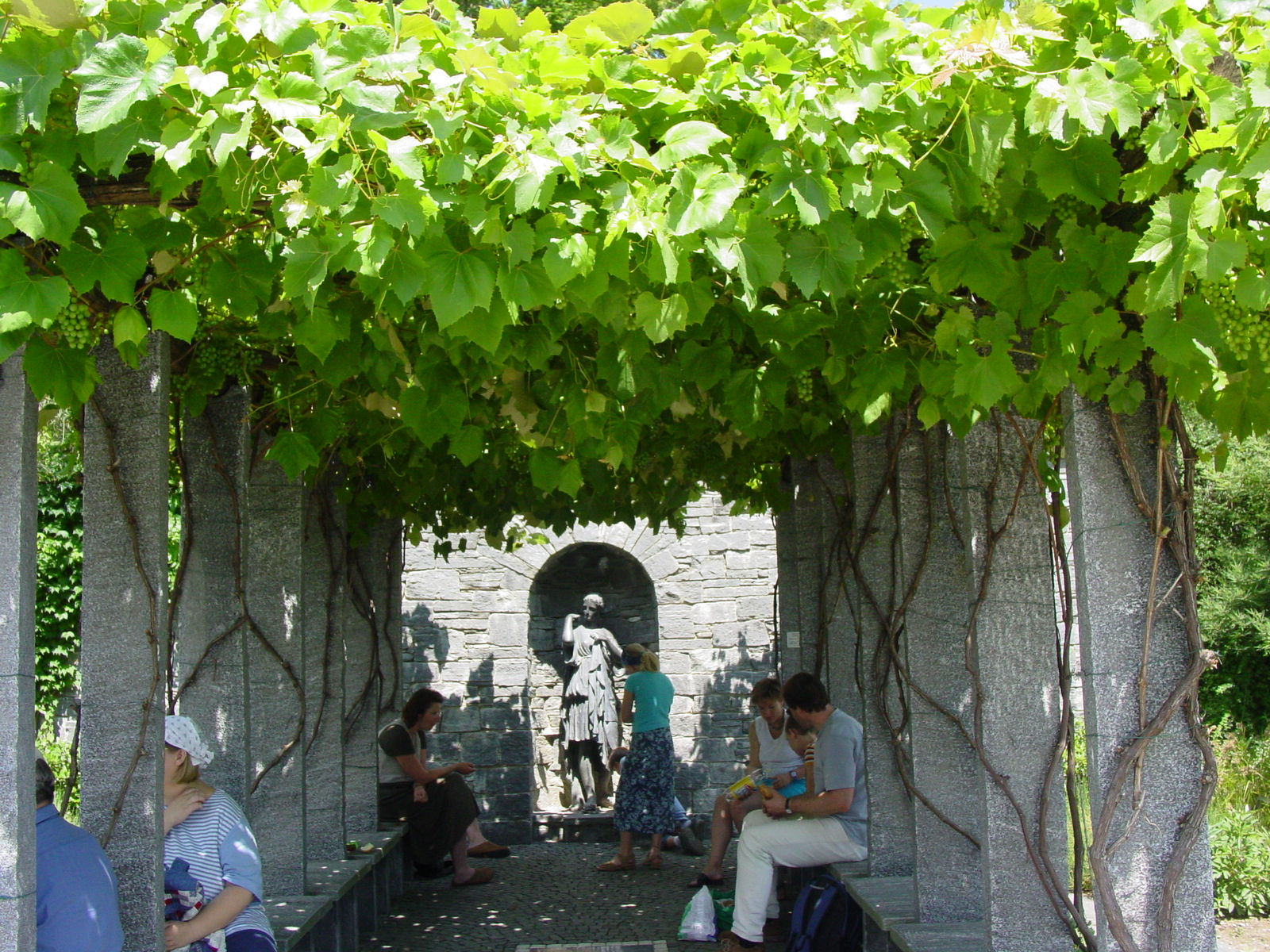

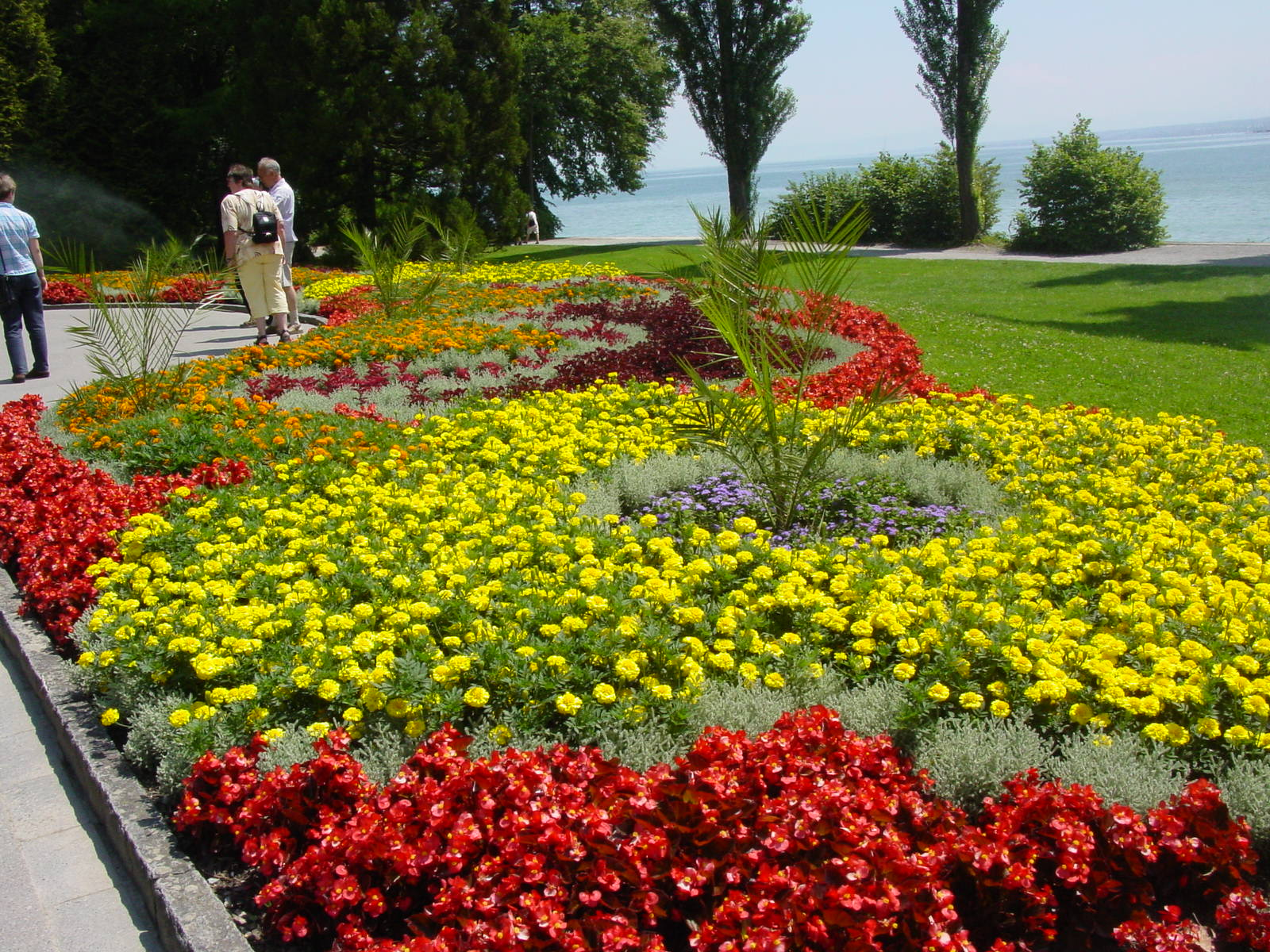

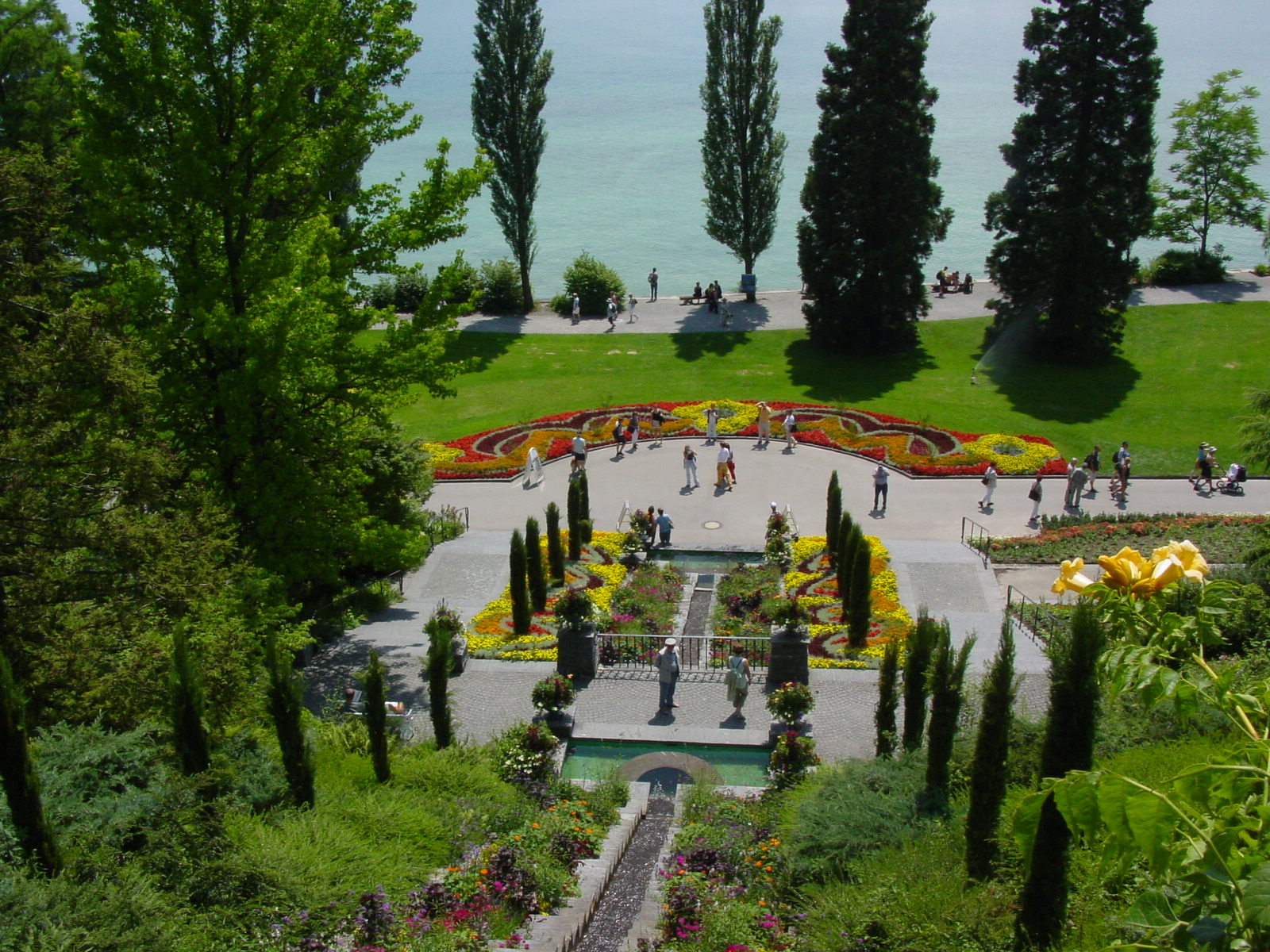

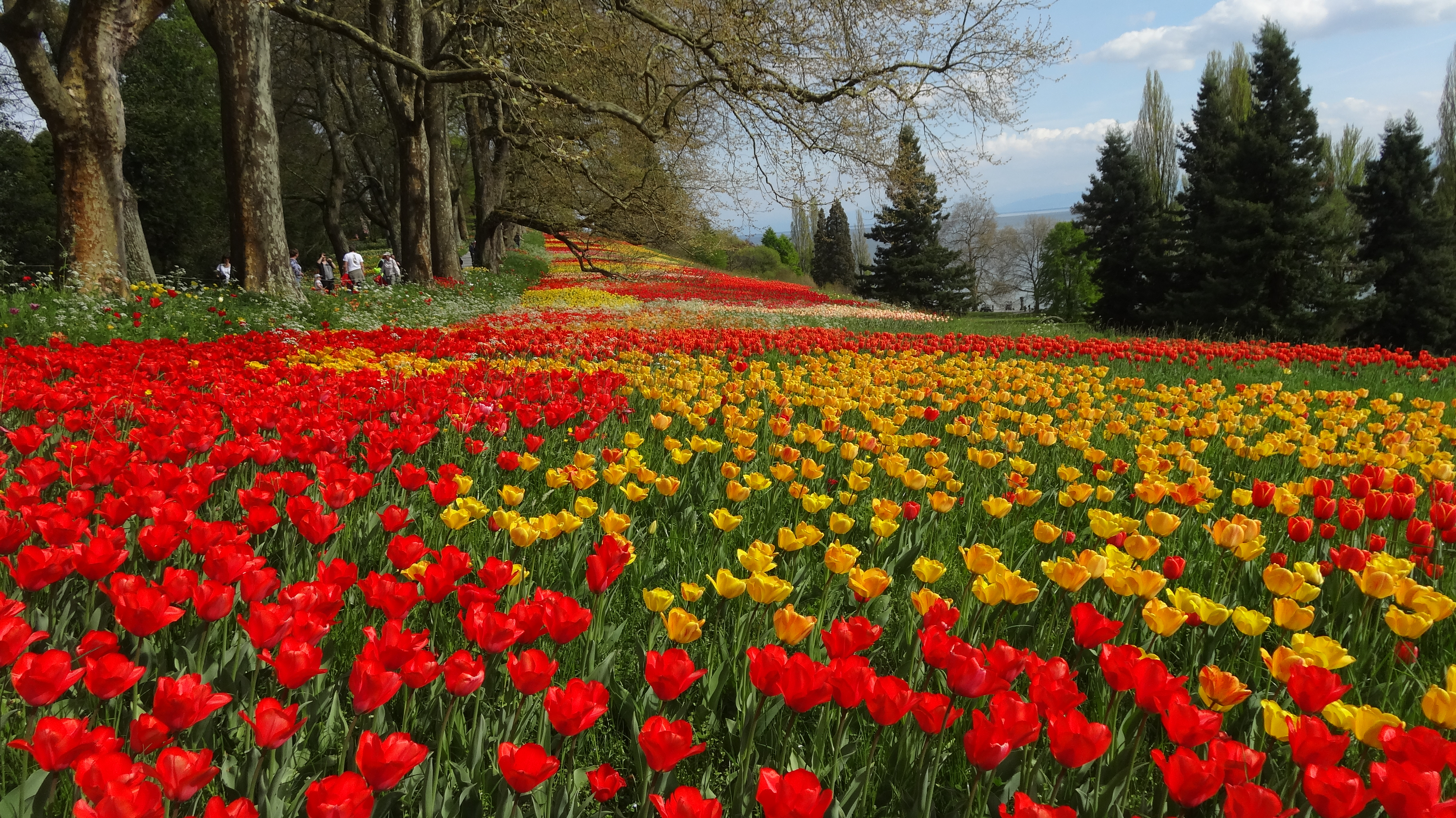

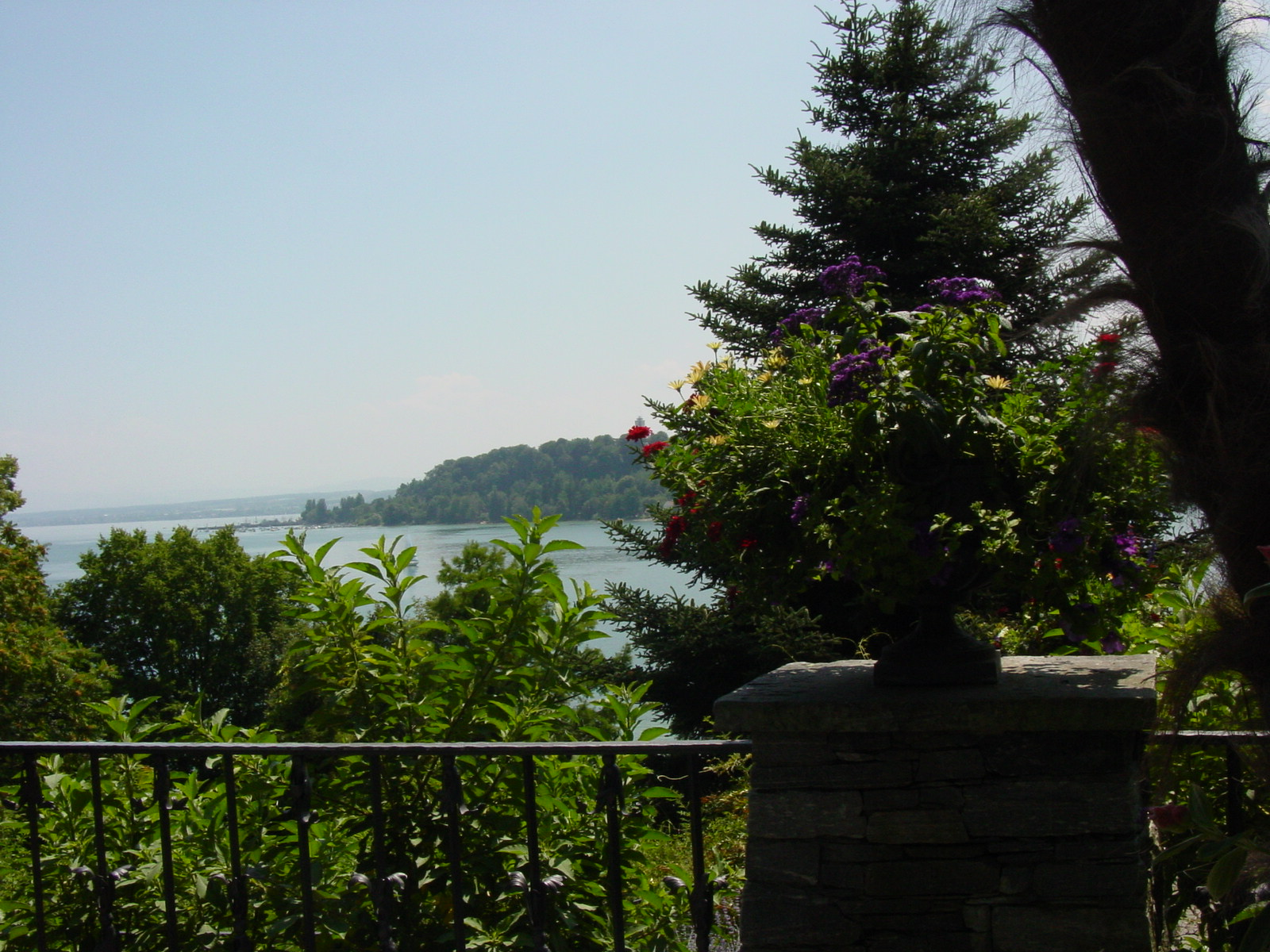

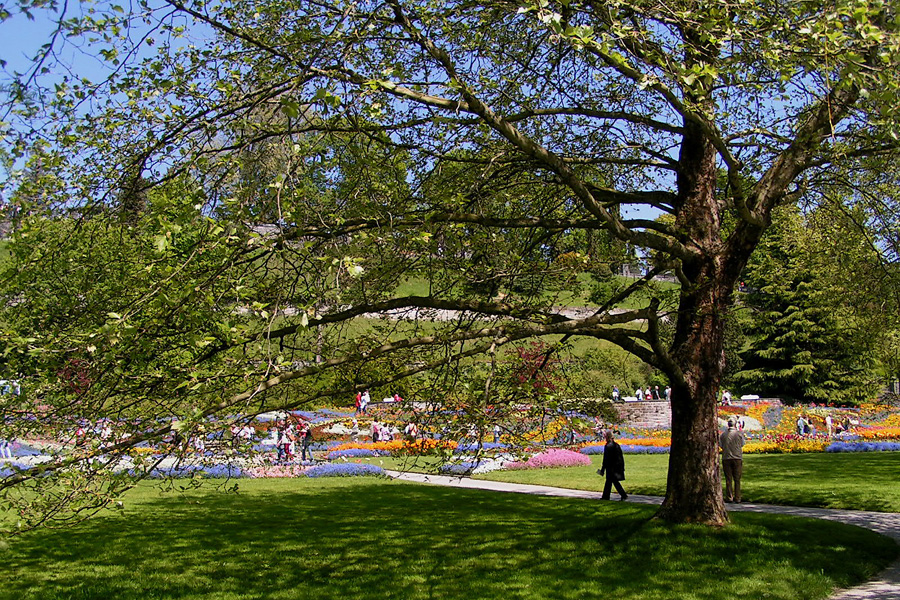

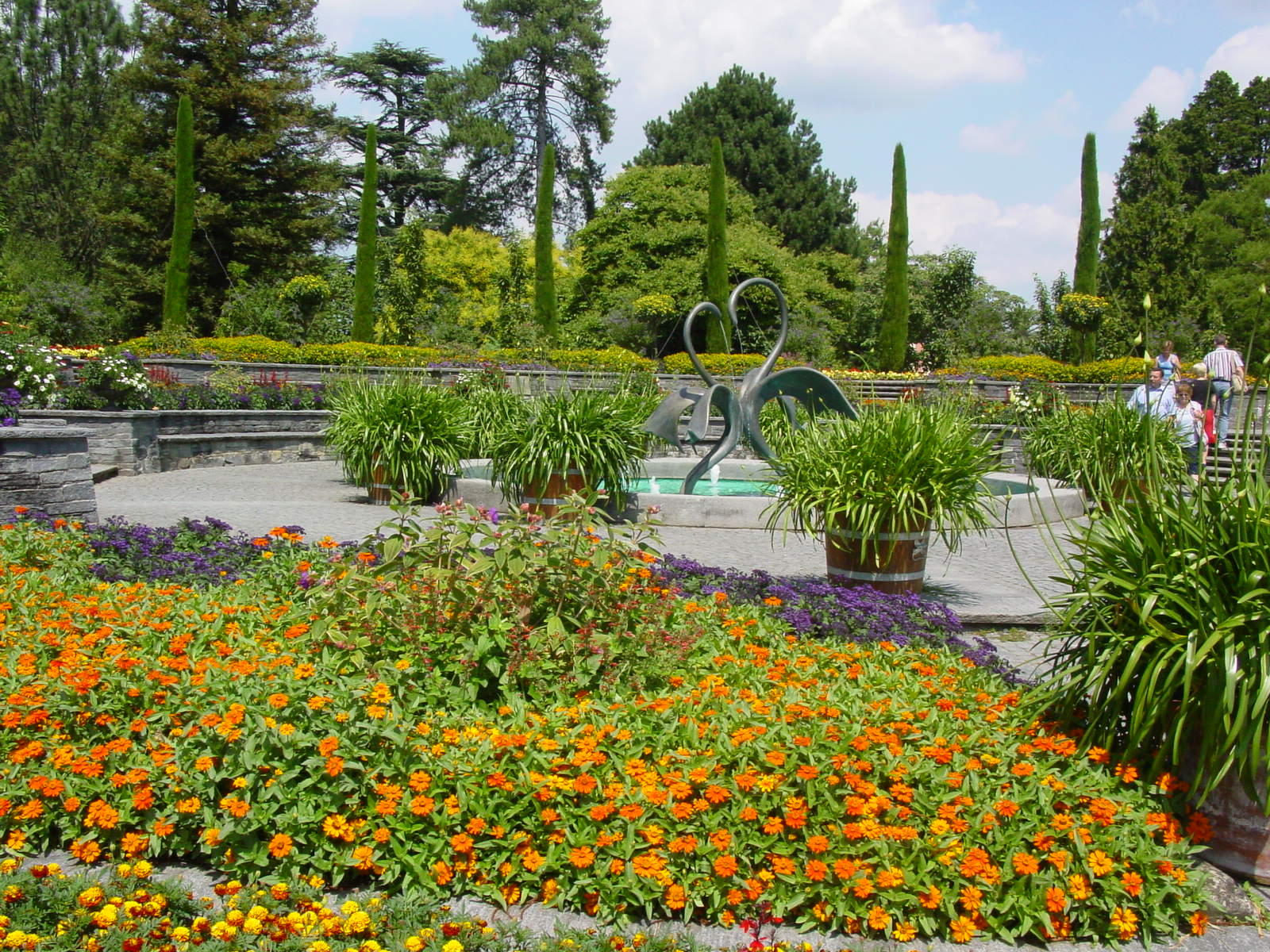

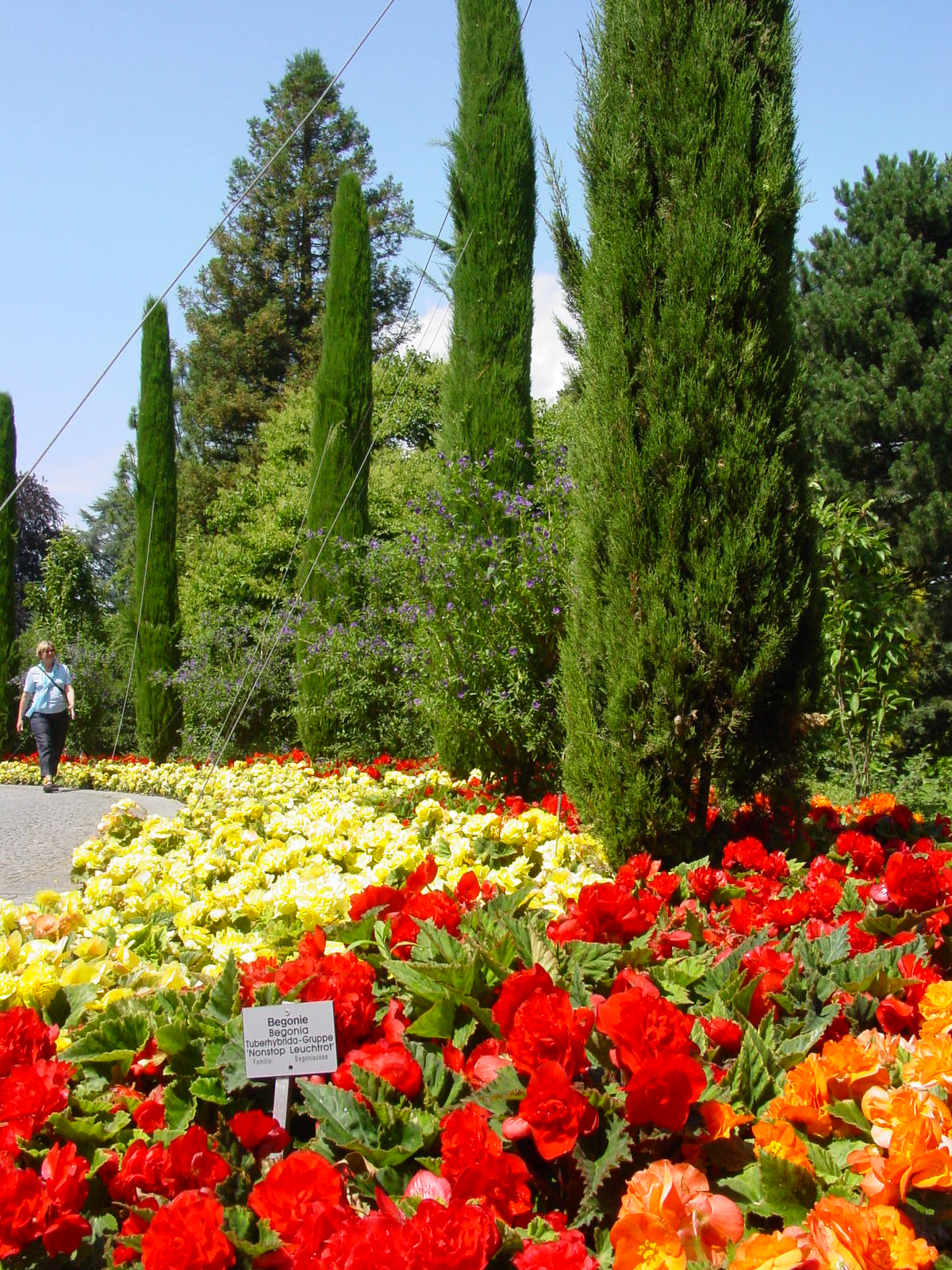

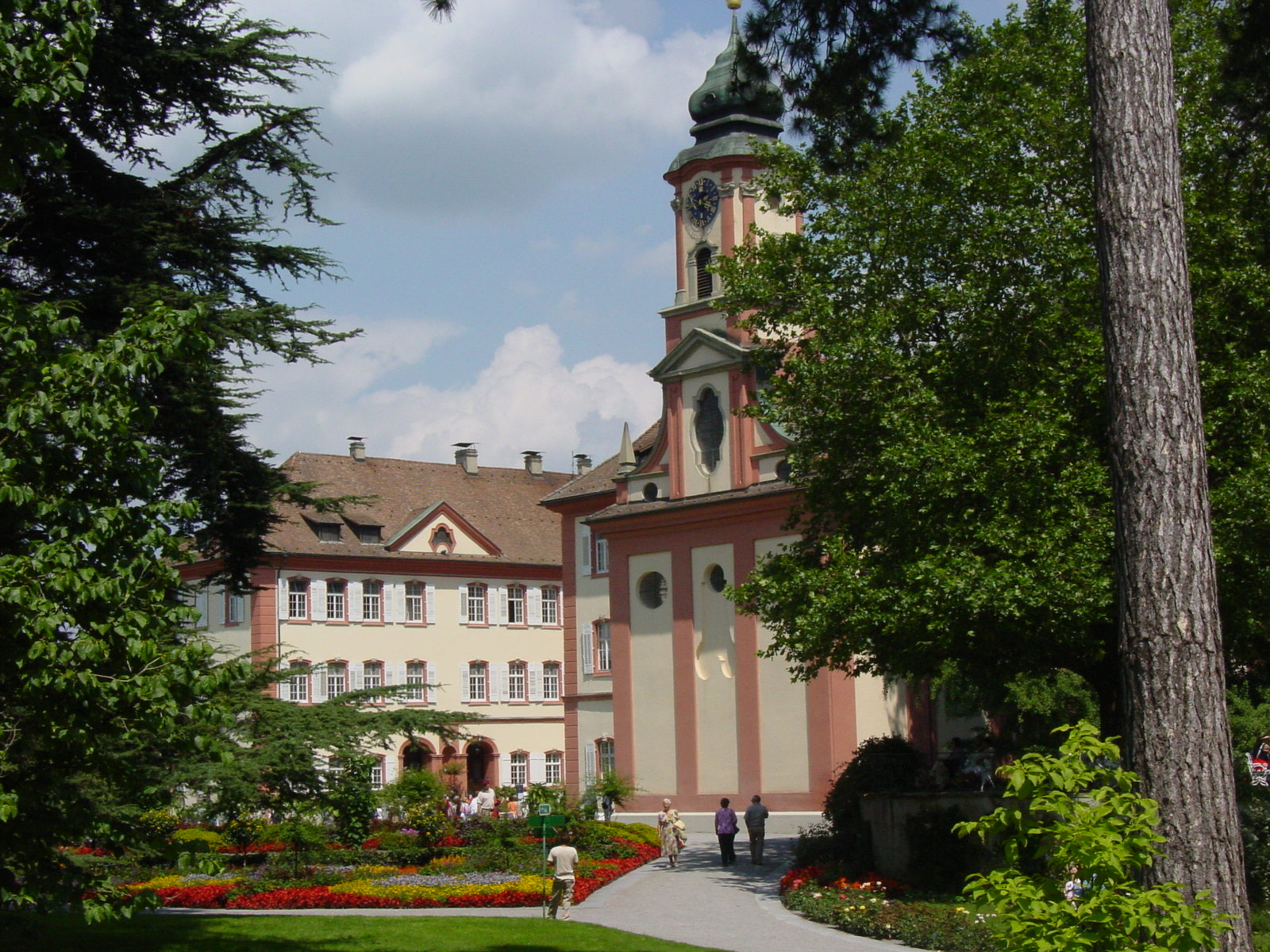

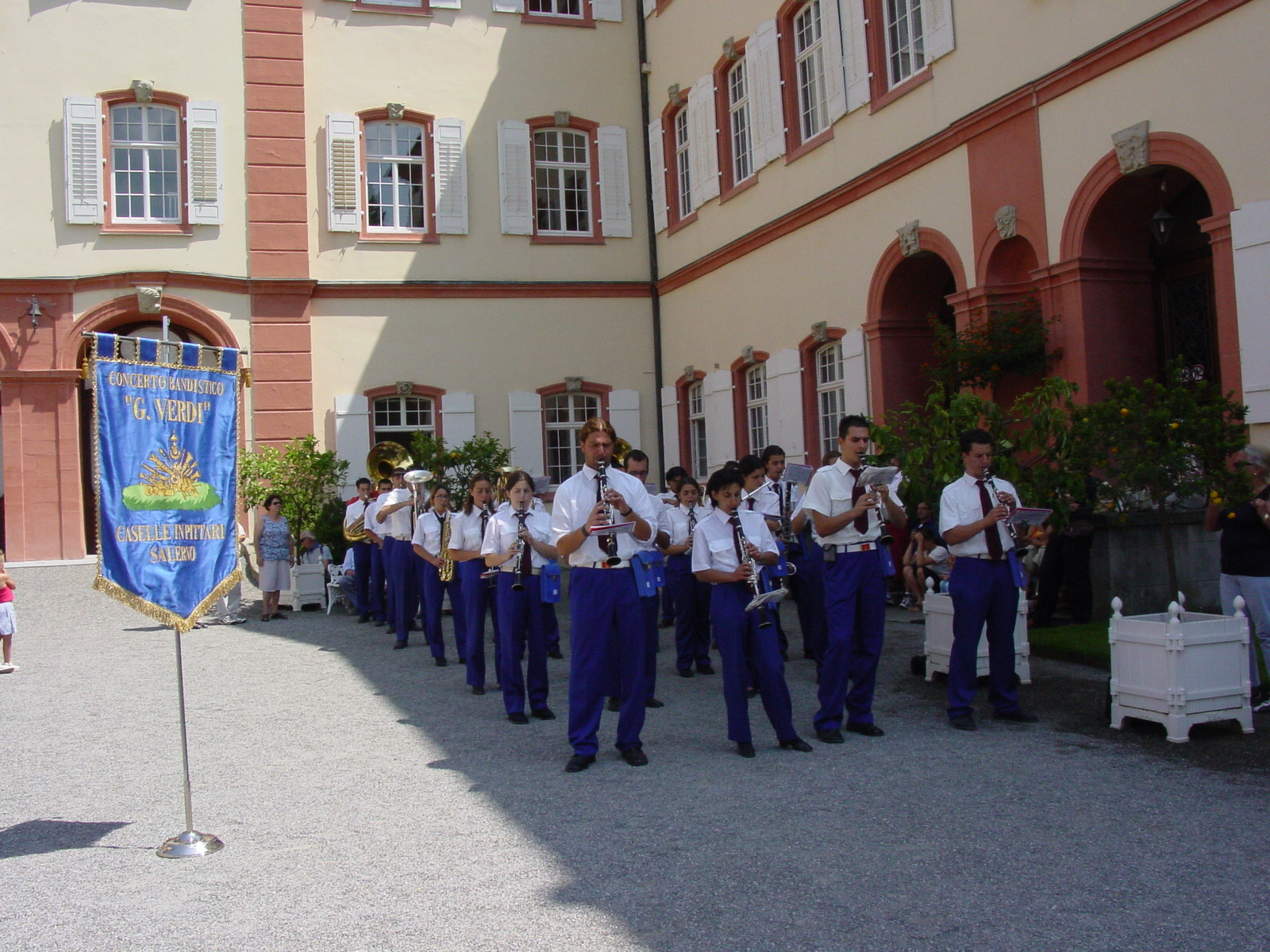

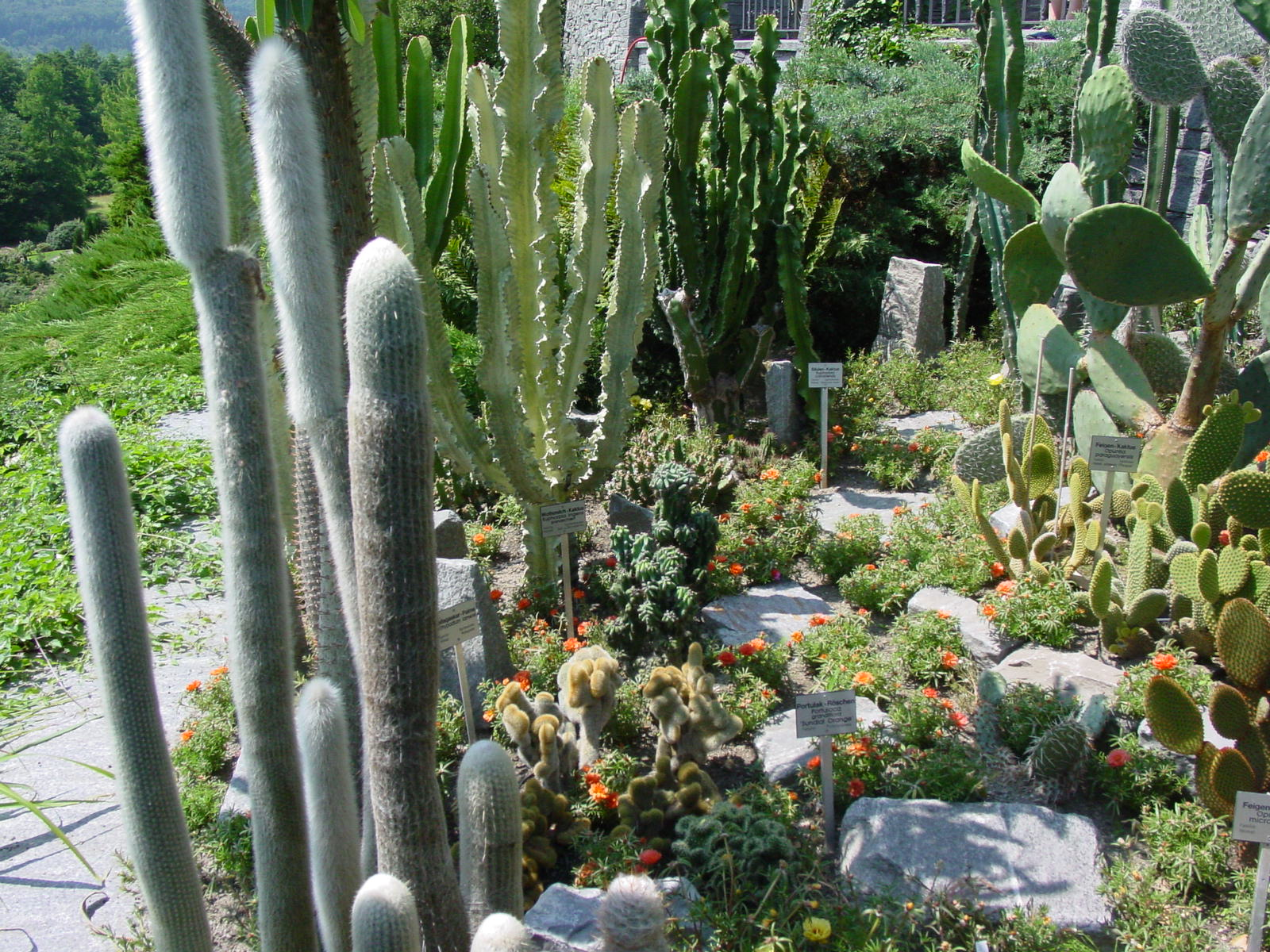

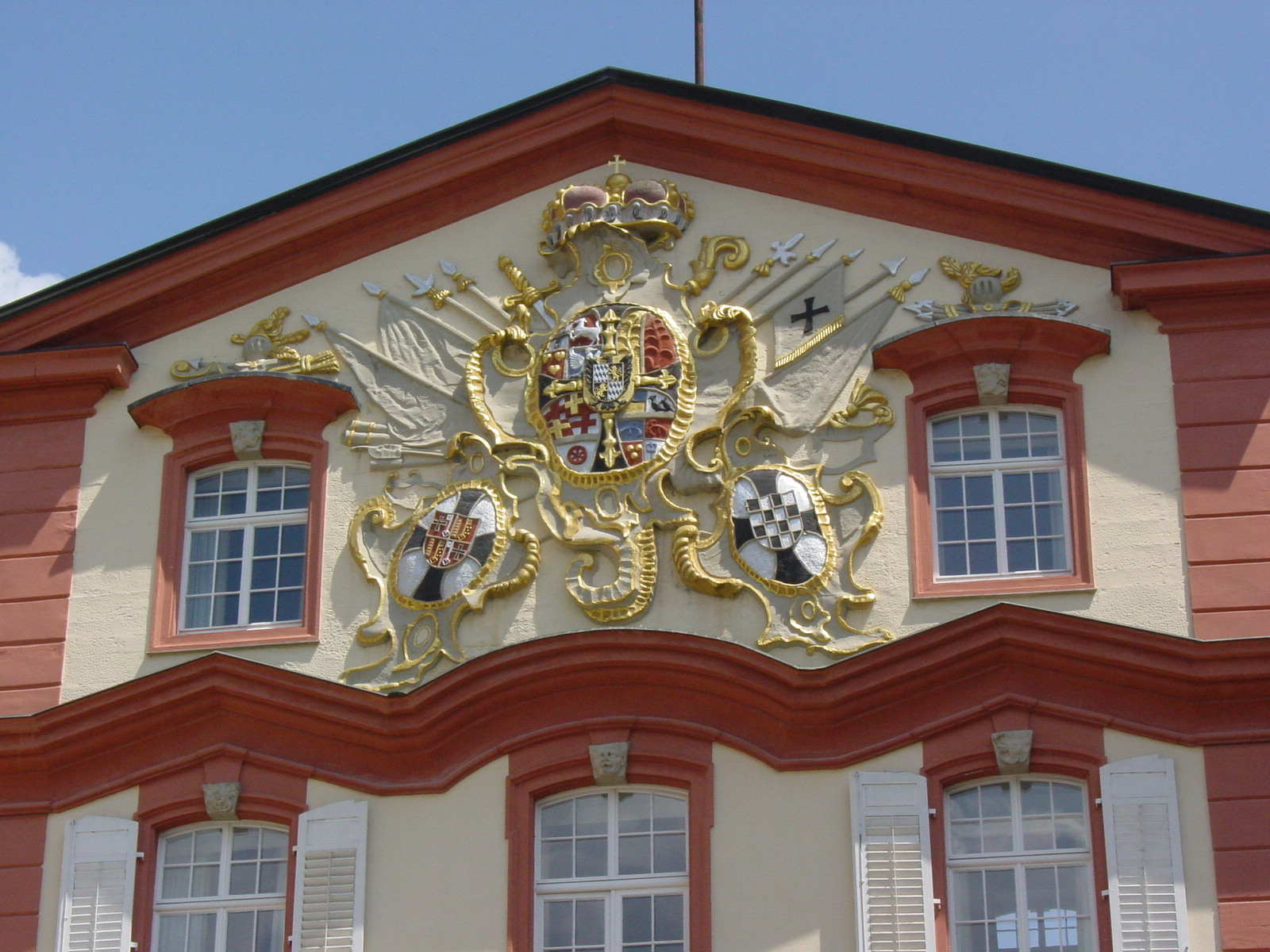

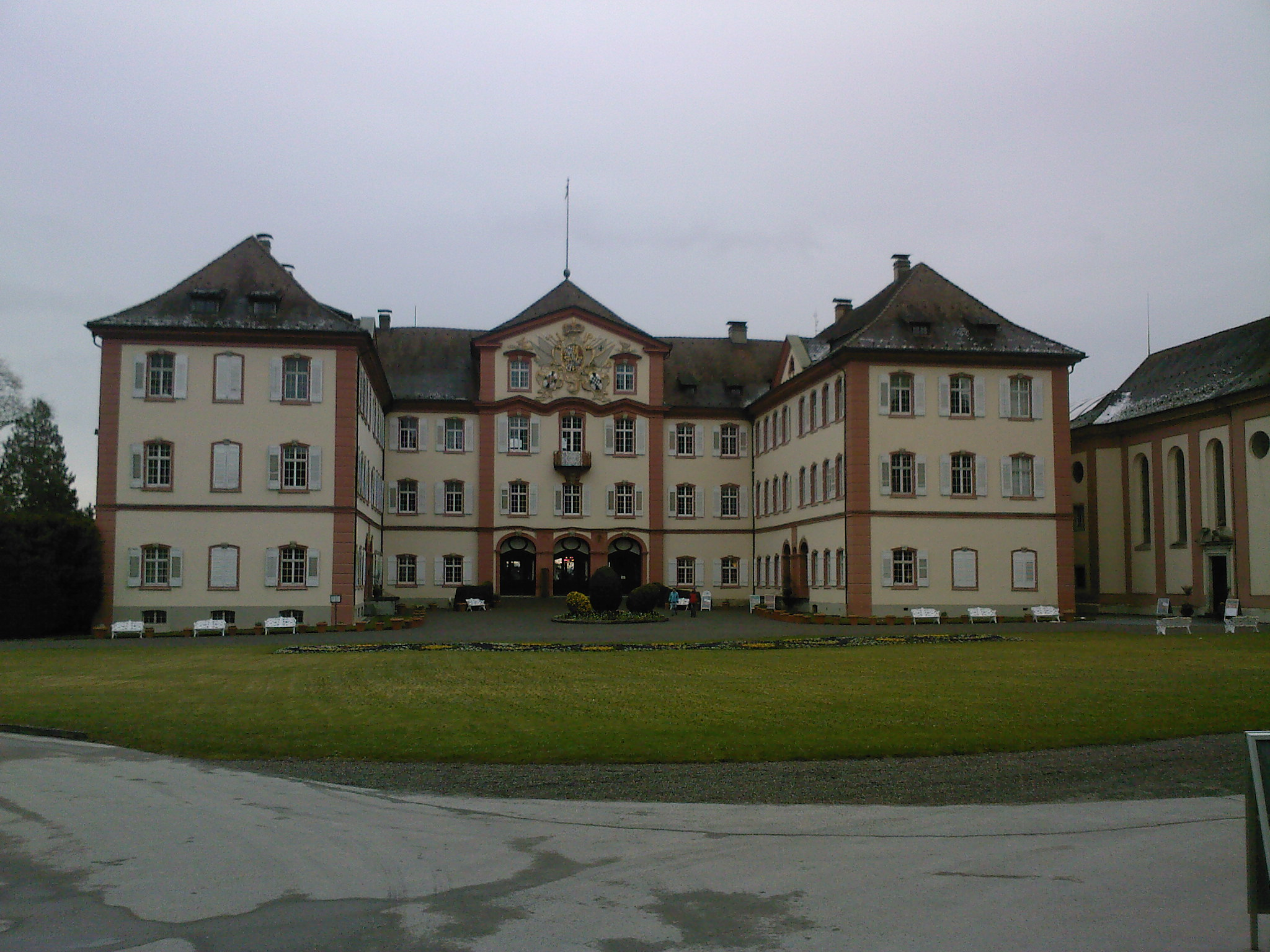
The palace in spring 2008
