= Sophia of Nassau =

Queen of Sweden and Norway

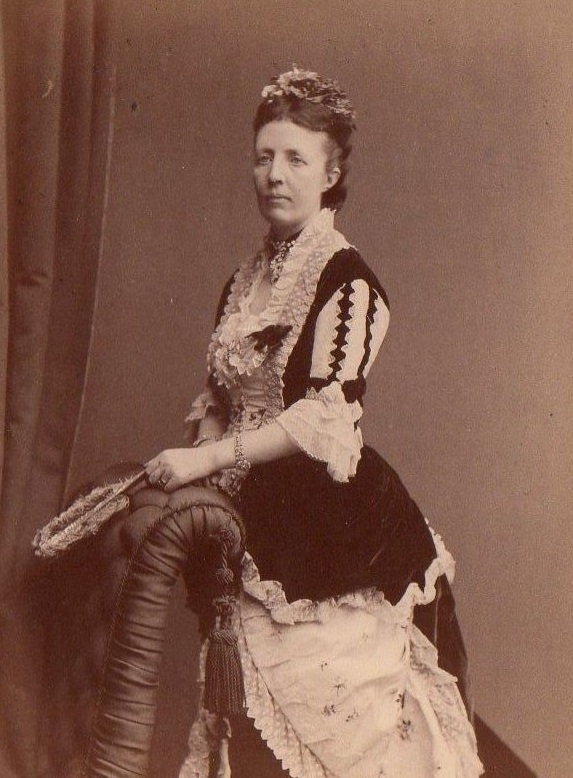
- Formal portrait, c. 1884

Queen consort of Sweden
- Tenure: 18 September 1872 – 8 December 1907
- Coronation: 12 May 1873

Queen consort of Norway
- Tenure: 18 September 1872 – 26 October 1905
- Coronation: 18 June 1873
- Born: 9 July 1836; Biebrich Palace, Hesse
- Died: 30 December 1913 (aged 77); Stockholm Palace, Sweden
- Burial: Riddarholmen Church
- Spouse: Oscar II of Sweden (m. 1857; died 1907)
- Issue: Gustaf V of Sweden; Prince Oscar Bernadotte; Prince Carl, Duke of Västergötland; Prince Eugen, Duke of Närke
- House: Nassau-Weilburg
- Father: Wilhelm, Duke of Nassau
- Mother: Princess Pauline of Württemberg

Sophia of Nassau (Sophia Wilhelmine Marianne Henriette; 9 July 1836 – 30 December 1913), also Sofia, was Queen of Sweden and Norway as the wife of King Oscar II. She was Queen of Sweden for 35 years, longer than anyone before her, and the longest-serving queen until 2011, when she was surpassed by Queen Silvia. She is also the most recent woman to have been officially Dowager Queen of Sweden.

== Early life ==
Sophia was the youngest daughter of Wilhelm, Duke of Nassau, by his second wife Princess Pauline Friederike Marie of Württemberg.

Her father died when she was three and was succeeded by her half-brother, the later Adolphe, Grand Duke of Luxembourg. Sophia was given what was considered a suitable education for princesses at the time by private tutors. She was trained in fencing, a sport normally reserved for males, to strengthen her back and correct her posture. Sophia socialized with academics and artists, and the court of Nassau was considered more democratic than what was usual at most German courts. She learned the English language early on and felt sympathy for the British parliamentarian system. The language spoken in her childhood home was not German but English. Sophia was given what has been referred to as an upbringing more similar to the middle-class Victorian life style, which she preferred rather than a royal one. Her brothers used to refer to her as Unsere demokratische Schwester (our democratic sister). She was described as serious, intelligent and dutiful, and interested in language and history: she was also genuinely religious.

In 1848, she witnessed a rebellion in the Duchy of Nassau, which was suppressed by her mother and brothers. She spent the winter of 1853–54 with her mother at the court of her maternal aunt in Saint Petersburg in Russia. Her maternal aunt, Princess Charlotte of Württemberg, was married to Grand Duke Michael Pavlovich of Russia. The trip was not made to arrange a marriage with a Russian prince because her mother did not wish her to convert, which would have been necessary, but rather, to have her study the life in a grand court. During her stay in Russia, she was a student of the pianist Anton Rubinstein. Sophia and her mother were forced to leave Russia at the outbreak of the Crimean war. After the death of her mother in 1856, Sophia lived with her half-sister, Princess Marie Wilhemine of Wied.

In July 1856, at her sister Marie's summer residence Monrepos castle outside Nassau, she received a visit from Prince Oscar of Sweden, Duke of Östergötland. Oscar was the second living son of the reigning king. Following the death of his elder brother Gustaf in 1852, he had become the future heir to the Swedish throne because his brother, the reigning Crown Prince, was unable to have more children with his spouse. It was therefore politically necessary for Oscar to marry. In 1855–56, Oscar was sent to visit various royal courts in Europe in order to find a suitable marriage partner in both rank and to his own taste. He visited the British court but did not wish to marry Princess Mary of Cambridge, and the Belgian and Prussian princesses who had been suggested did not wish to marry him. The marriage of Sophia and Oscar should not be regarded as an arranged marriage: Oscar had been given the freedom to choose a princess he liked from the many courts he visited, and Sophia, who had previously been proposed to, did not wish to be pressured into marriage. Sophia and Oscar, however, fell in love with each other.

After the visit, Oscar returned to Sweden to ask for his parents' consent to marry, which was granted. He then returned to Nassau, where the engagement was made in September and announced in October. During the engagement, Sophia was educated in the Swedish language and history, and corresponded with her future spouse: soon, the correspondence was conducted in Swedish. She also mastered Norwegian quickly.

== Duchess and crown princess ==
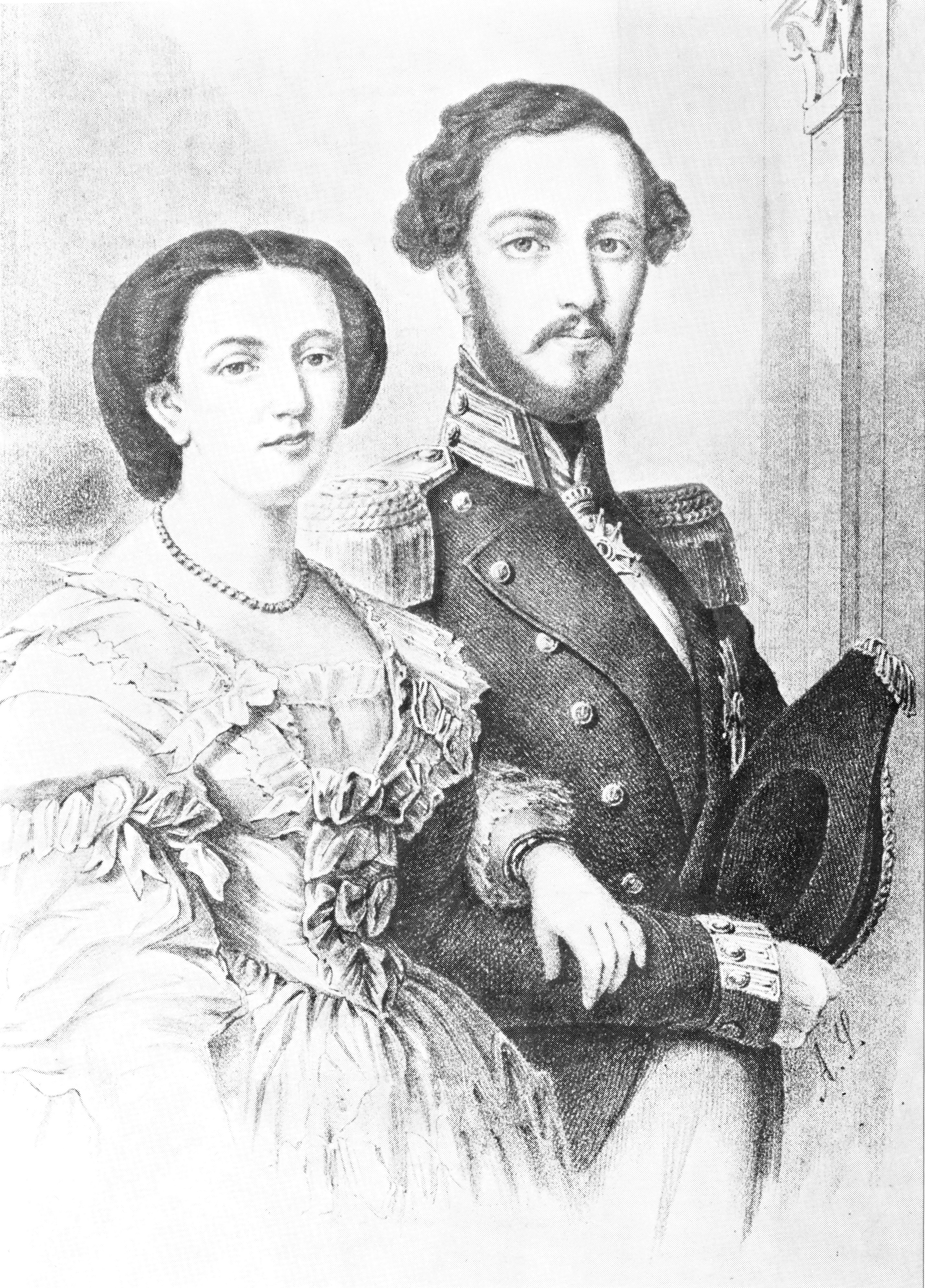
Prince Oscar and Princess Sophia at the time of their marriage in 1857

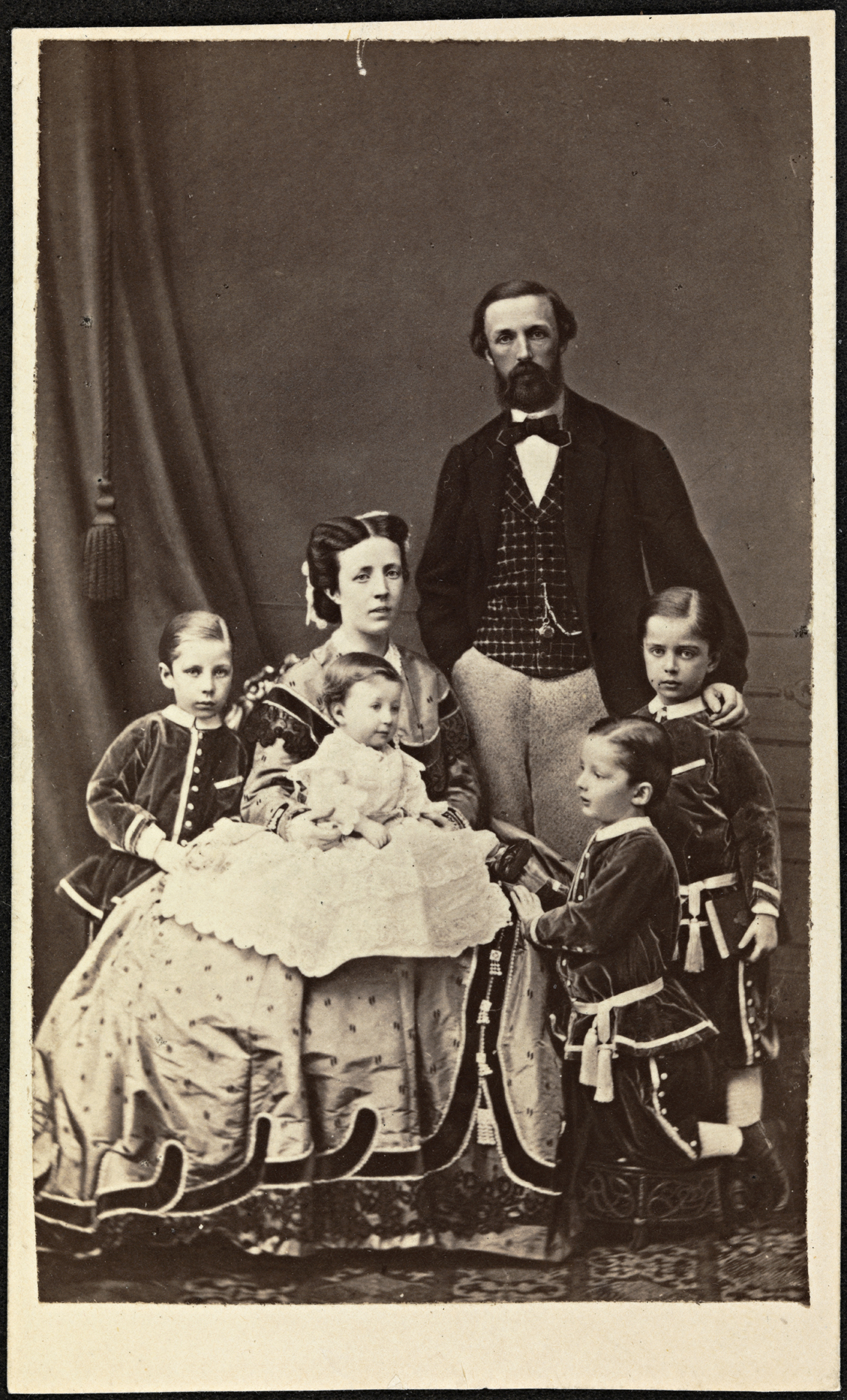
A photograph of Crown Princess Sofia of Sweden with her husband, Crown Prince Oscar and their sons (Gustaf, Oscar Bernadotte, Carl and Eugén), 1865.

Sophia and Oscar were married on 6 June 1857 at the Castle in Wiesbaden-Biebrich. Sophia arrived in the city of Stockholm with Oscar on 19 June 1857, and was met by her Swedish Mistress of the Robes, countess Wilhelmina Bonde, and her maid of honor Augusta Jegerhjelm at the ship Travemünde. There they were greeted with salutes, singing and crowds. Sophia was received with great enthusiasm upon her arrival in Sweden. Since the current Crown Princess Louise had become sterile after delivering her last child, and the elder brother of Oscar, Crown Prince Charles, had no son and his daughter was not accepted as heir to the throne under the present constitution, Sophia was seen as the solution of the succession problem and future Queen. She was dressed in blue at her arrival, and was therefore nicknamed The Blue Duchess, Den Blåa Hertiginnan, in Swedish. At the palace, she was first presented for the royal court, and then introduced to the royal family in the salon of the queen. Upon meeting the king, who was by then described as almost deranged and placed under the regency of the crown prince, she rushed to him, curtsied and embraced him.

In 1858, Sophia gave birth to a son, which secured the Bernadotte dynasty and gave her much popularity. The birth took place at Drottningholm Palace according to old court protocol, with the entire court and members of the government present in the chamber outside of the bedroom as witnesses. Following the death of her father-in-law King Oscar I in 1859, her brother-in-law became King Charles XV and her husband the heir presumptive.

The couple were given Arvfurstens palats in Stockholm as their residence. Sophia was described as calm and controlled, practical and sensible. She had a good relationship with her parents-in-law and her sister-in-law Princess Eugénie. Her relationship to Charles XV and Queen Louise was, however, tense. Sophia, herself strictly moral, disliked the French-influenced frivolity of her brother-in-law Charles XV's court.

By 1861, Sophia had given birth three times in three years, and after this her health was frail. The same year she made a trip to Nice to cure her health, and she continued to make trips for health reasons. The next trip was made in 1863; this time to Germany. In 1864, she engaged in the building of their summer residence Sofiero Palace by Öresund, which was named after her. In Sofiero they could remain in contact with the Danish royal family at Fredensborg on the other side of Öresund. The gatherings at Sofiero would sometimes be given a political dimension as the center of family councils.

Sophia exercised strong discipline over her children. Her decision to breastfeed, at that time unusual for the upper class, attracted attention. She also aroused attention when she in 1869 placed her sons in a public school rather than letting them be educated at home as had been the tradition in the royal house. This was the Christian boys' school Beskowska Skolan of the theologian and vicar Gustaf Emanuel Beskow, whose sermons she often attended. Sophia had always had a very close interest in religion—an interest she shared with her sister-in-law Eugenie, in whose company she was introduced to various different Christian branches. From 1866, she was the chairperson of the charity organisation Allmänna skyddsföreningen (The Protection Society) for poor women in Stockholm.

Sophia was interested in politics and engaged herself in state affairs during her life, and was occasionally present as an observer during the parliamentary sessions. In 1866 her birth country, the Duchy of Nassau, was annexed by Prussia. After this, she kept an anti-Prussian view. In the summer of 1870, she was present in Ems where she met both the Emperor of Russia and the King of Prussia shortly before the declaration of the war, and kept herself informed about the political situation. She did not oppose the united Empire of Germany as such, but disliked how it had been created and the dominance of Prussia. She did, however, have a good personal relationship with Crown Prince Frederick William of Prussia and his consort Victoria, Princess Royal.

== Queen of Sweden and Norway ==
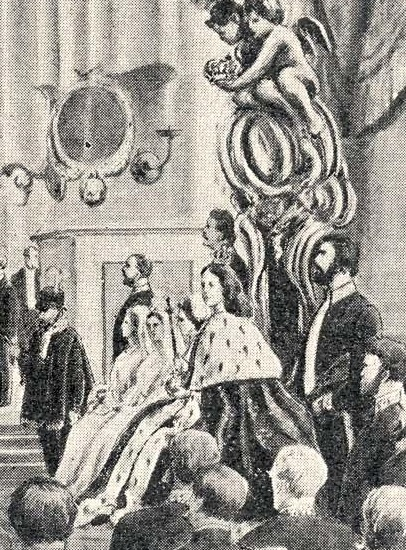
Sofia at Oscar's and her coronation, wearing the Queen's Crown

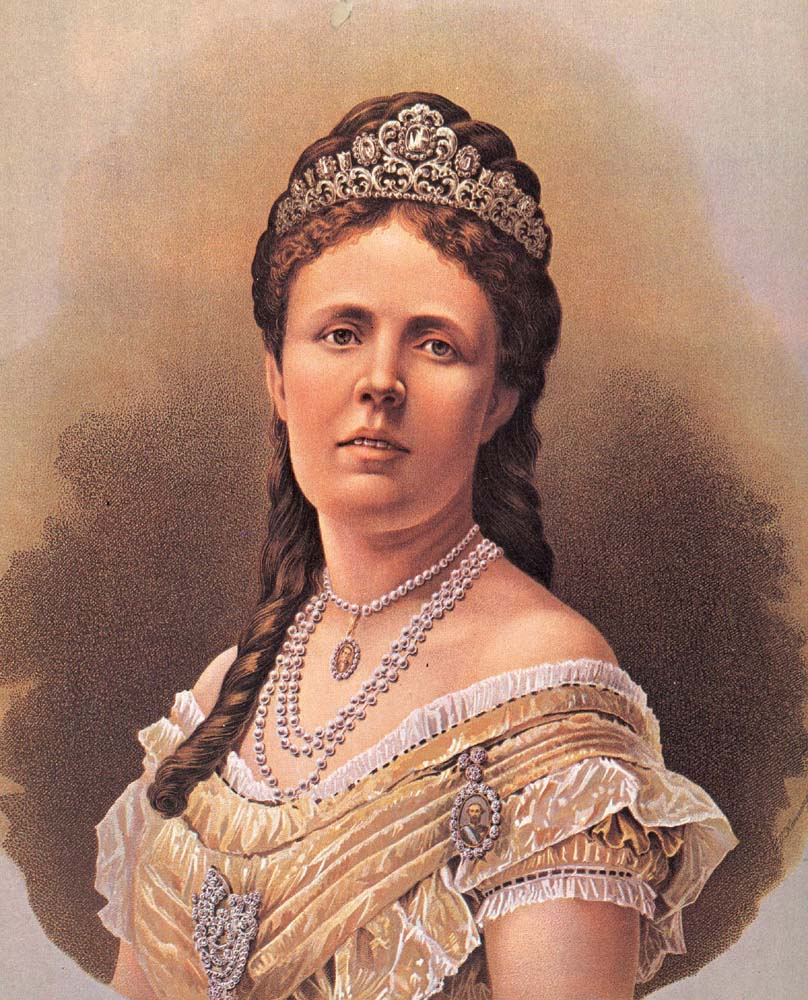
Sofia of Nassau as queen of Sweden, ca 1873.

Upon the death of her brother-in-law on 18 September 1872, Sophia became queen consort of Sweden and Norway. At that time, there was a tense political situation and demands for a republic. Oscar was initially not popular, but there were hopes that he would let himself be guided by the advice of Sophia, who was considered politically insightful. Also in Norway, there were hopes that Sophia would use her influence on Oscar to introduce a more equal place in the union. Sophia was crowned with Oscar in Stockholm in Sweden 12 May and in Trondhjem (now Trondheim) in Norway 18 June 1873. In Norway, the couple made a tour around the country in connection to the coronation which has been described as a triumph.

In 1875, the king and queen made a tour in Europe. They first visited Denmark and after this Berlin and then Dresden. The visit to King Albert of Saxony and his Queen, Carola of Vasa in Dresden was considered significant, as this meant a symbolic peace between the Bernadotte dynasty and the deposed Vasa dynasty, as Queen Carola was the granddaughter of the deposed king Gustav IV Adolf and let it be known that the past was forgotten. After Dresden, Sophia interrupted the tour for health reasons while Oscar continued to Weimar and Russia. Another important event was the uncovering of the statue of Charles XIV John in Christiania (since 1926 Oslo) on 7 September 1875, which was celebrated with great festivities with invited foreign royalty and military parades and considered a memorable propaganda occasion. Another important event as Queen of Norway was the stay at Moss in 1877 with the former Prince Imperial Napoleon of France.

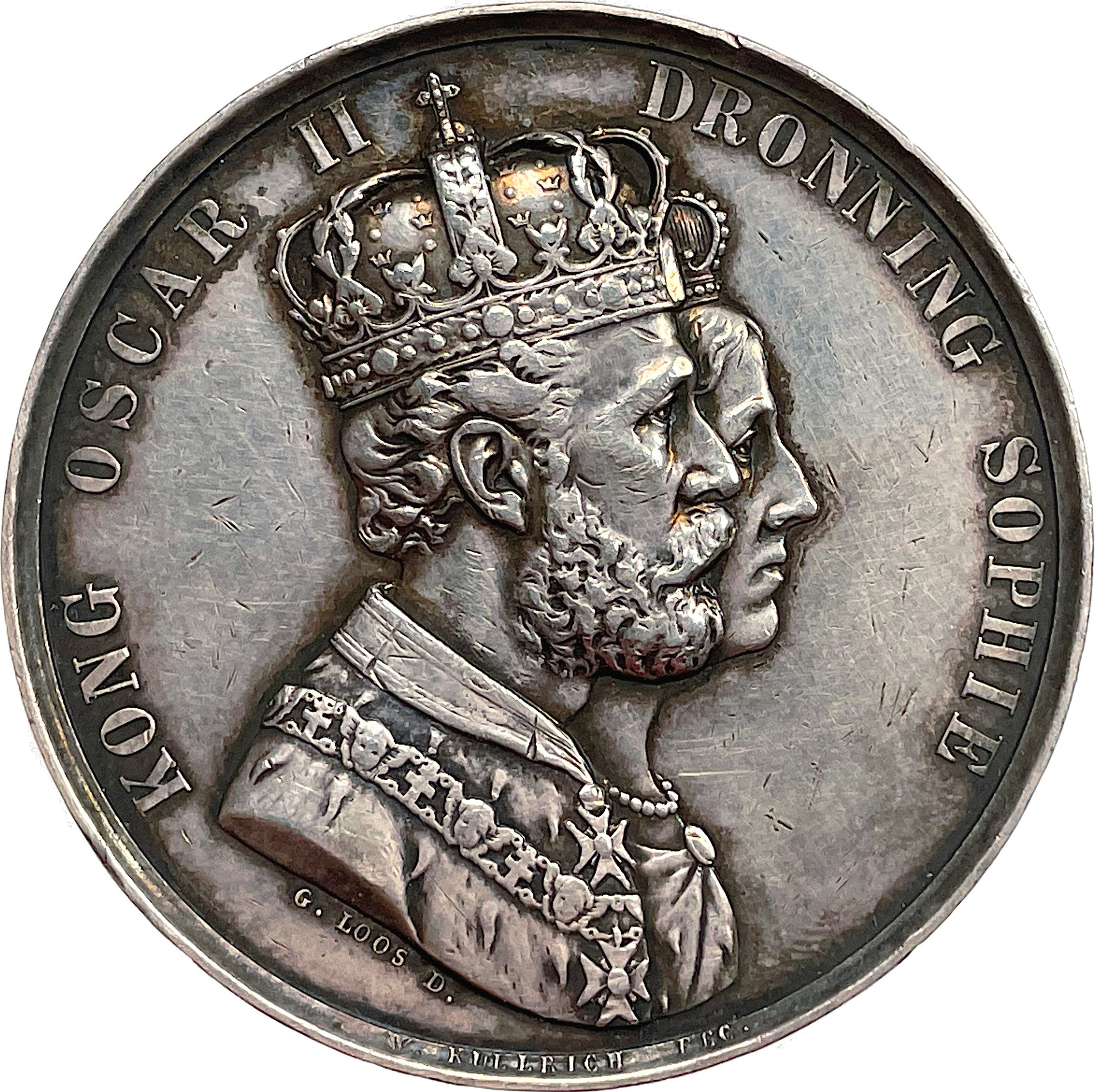
Norwegian coronation medal for Oscar and Sophia

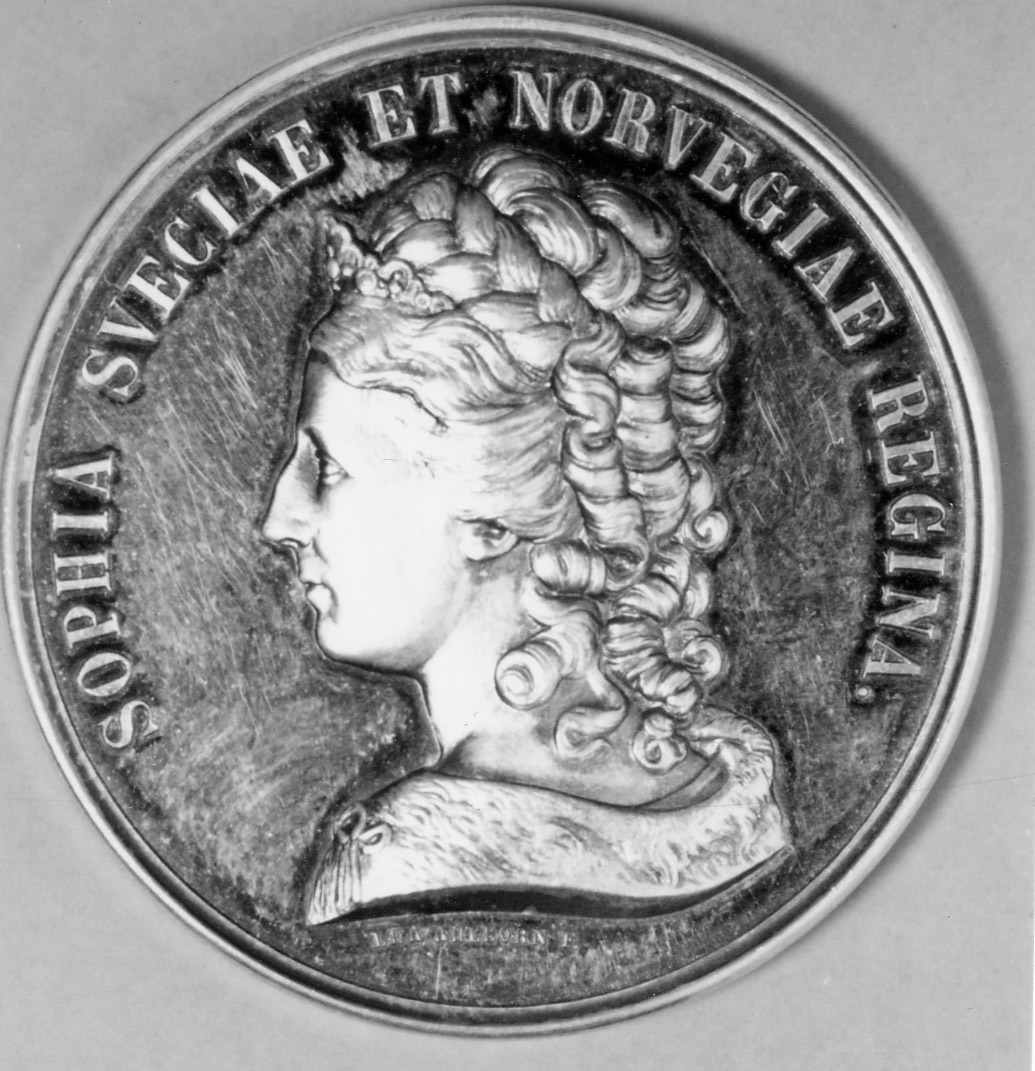
1874 medal for Queen Sophia

During the autumns, the royal couples normally stayed at Drottningholm Palace, where they received foreign royal dignitaries and hosted ceremonial parties. During the winters, they engaged in representation in both Stockholm and in Christiania. When visiting Norway, they were met by the border by a separate Norwegian court, who served during their stay there. In Norway, her principal ladies-in-waiting were Alette Due and Elise Løvenskiold. Sophia was known to dress spectacular at formal occasions, with many jewels, much lace and ornaments and bright colors such as red and blue. Oscar II normally spent his summers with his friends at his yacht Drott at Marstrand, while Sophia often spent her summers first at the Ulriksdal Palace, and in later years more often in Norway. From 1892 until 1904, she spent her Norwegian summers at Skinnarbøl manor outside Kongsvinger, where she is remembered for her simple life style and generosity toward the local population. She was popular in Norway, and described as the queen who had spent the most time in Norway among all the queens during the union Sweden-Norway.

Sophia herself described the years between 1873 and 1878 as years of crisis for her. During these years, Oscar had several affairs, notably with Magda von Dolcke and with Marie Friberg. Oscar's affair with Magda von Dolcke begun in 1874 and attracted great attention, and he benefited her career at the Royal Dramatic theatre and gave her an allowance. Though she did not demonstrate, Sophia is believed to have suffered from his adultery. It is related how Sophia traveled to Germany to look for comfort with her half sister Marie of Wied, who, it is believed, advised her to accept the situation. At one occasion, the king had a courtier sent to the opera singer Ida Basilier-Magelssen with a request of a "private audience", and she replied: "Tell His Majesty that he may have a private audience with his good and beautiful Queen. I have others things to do than to have private conferences with old gentlemen!" Being told of this, Queen Sophia sent for Basilier-Magelssen and their meeting reportedly ended with mutual tears over their adulterous husbands. Her health requested her to take frequent trips abroad, and her marriage apparently underwent a crisis where her marital relations were discontinued. The marital crisis was observed and mentioned by her closest surroundings, and during a trip on the continent in 1876, Sophia sent Oscar what she referred to as a farewell letter.

The year of 1878 was a turning point for Queen Sophia. This year she became a follower of the teachings of the British preacher Lord Radstock, to whom she was introduced by her lady-in-waiting Märta Eketrä. After this, she spent a great deal of her everyday life in prayer with her favorite ladies-in-waiting Eketrä, Ebba von Rosen and Ida Wedel-Jarlsberg. Oscar II was skeptical toward this because of his position as the head of the Swedish church, but their relationship was in fact improved after her new religious conviction.

Queen Sophia was after 1878 much engaged in her religious interests, and her work for the Great Awakening was quite significant. This made her less interested in participating in representation and society life, and Carl Fleetwood remarked that the master of her court was in fact reverend Beskow. She eventually restricted participation in court and society life to when it was absolutely necessary. When she attended the Amaranter Ball in 1885, the occasion was rare enough to attract attention. Sophia preferred a private life, such as dinners and musical soirees in the company of family members and her ladies-in-waiting. Queen Sophia suffered from poor health: in 1875–1877, for example, she was almost constantly absent abroad for health reasons, and though it was better after 1877, she continued to visit particularly Amsterdam for the medical care of Doctor Metzger. During a visit to Paris, she caused great attention when she dined at a public restaurant: this was unusual for a royal woman at this time, and it was also the only time she ever did that. In 1885, her son Prince Carl, Duke of Västergötland fell sick in Istanbul, and she and Oscar II visited the Ottoman Empire, where they were received by Sultan Abdul Hamid II and Sophia was given permission to visit the Imperial Harem. They also visited Romania.

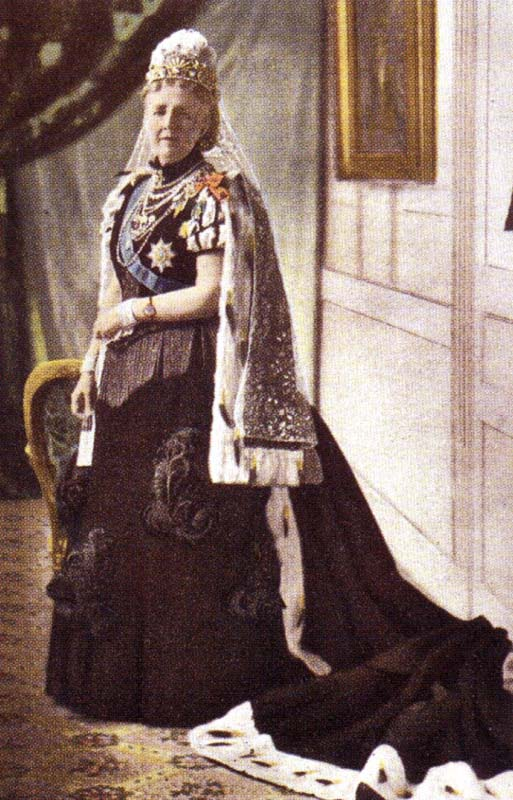
Queen Sofia in formal court dress, ca 1900.

Queen Sophia performed a great effort in her work to improve medical care, and founded the first nursing school in Sweden. She studied the work of Florence Nightingale, and visited Great Britain with Oscar in 1881, where they were received by Queen Victoria. During her visit, she studied the modern medical institutions in London. Upon her return, she launched a project to educate professional nurses in Sweden. This work was only just started by the pioneering work of Emmy Rappe in 1867, but there was as yet no proper educational institution for nurses, and the medical world was sceptical. In 1882 she managed to arrange classes for nurses at the Sabbatsberg Hospital; 1884 she opened the Sophiahemmet University College for the students; and in 1889 it was developed to the Sophiahemmet, a combined hospital and school for nurses. The Sophiahemmet was seen as a role model for the education of nurses in Sweden, and it is also seen as the proper establishment of the nurse profession in Sweden. Sophia was very active in increasing respect for the nursing profession among doctors, who did not consider the work to be suitable for an educated female, and to make the profession respected, she wished for the profession to be seen as a religious calling and that it be undertaken by medically educated women, and she encouraged upper-class women to be nurses, all because she wanted nurses to be respected: the first head of her nursing school was the noble Alfhild Ehrenborg, who was a student of Florence Nightingale, and the Queen was actively involved in the institution until her death. In her nursing school, even students from the aristocracy were expected to scrub the floors. Two students of Sophiahemmet, Alma Brunskog and Olga Claréus was to have great significance for the medical care in Norway. Sophia chaired about fifty different charity organisations in Sweden and Norway. She received help seekers once a week, supported The Salvation Army and founded many organisations herself.

Sophia was reportedly closest to her sons Oscar, whose religious interests she shared, and Eugen. In 1886, she supported Eugen, who wanted to study art in Paris. She also supported Oscar in his wish to marry the noble lady-in-waiting Ebba Munck af Fulkila. Her son Eugen said of her that human worth and justice almost had a higher standing with her than her deep piety. In 1887, she was forced to undergo an ovariotomy operation. The operation was considered potentially life-threatening. Before the operation, she made her will. She also took a vow of Oscar II, that should she survive the operation, the King would allow for Oscar to finally marry Ebba Munck. After the operation, Oscar made use of this and the wedding could finally take place. The surgery was considered a success, but afterwards she had difficulty walking and was occasionally forced to use a wheelchair. Despite this she continued riding.

In 1881, she attended the wedding of her son, Crown Prince Gustav, to Victoria of Baden in Karlsruhe. Sophia had preferred her son to marry Princess Beatrice of the United Kingdom, as she had great admiration for Queen Victoria, but was initially very enthusiastic about the choice of Victoria of Baden, as she was a descendant of the former Swedish Vasa dynasty. Her relationship with her daughter-in-law was, however, to become tense. Sophia and Victoria had opposing political views, and Sophia took offence when Gustav started to listen to Victoria rather than to her, while Victoria criticized Sophia's influence on the king: the German diplomat Eulenberg reported that Victoria had stated, that Queen Sophia pressured the King to give in to the opposition to avoid conflicts, that she was relentlessly willful and that Oscar was afraid of her. Sophia disliked Victoria's cousin Emperor William II of Germany with whom she had several conflicts.

Politically, Sophia has been described as liberal and almost democratic in her views. Her political influence upon Oscar II is regarded as significant. She is regarded to have acted as his political adviser and is known to have used her political influence on several occasions, at least after 1878. Sophia showed a great interest in Norway and the questions surrounding the union between Sweden and Norway. The King was expected to visit Norway regularly during a reign when the crisis of the union became more and more frequent, and the Queen normally accompanied him, sometimes also against his will. In Kristiania, she often invited the spouses of politicians to the Royal Palace and created an important net of contacts from both the right wing royalists and the left wing republicans. In 1882–84, there was a serious crisis in Norway and talk of revolution, which eventually led to the ban of the royal veto and the loss of royal power there, and she was actively involved in the crisis. Though opposed to the reform, she saw it necessary to give in. Yngvar Nielsen related a scene when he read the news for the Queen: the King entered to room, fell on his knees before her and said: "Yes, Sophia, now you are in!", upon which she kissed his hand before he rose and stated that he took it hard but that he would keep his word. During the 1884 crisis, her influence was evident as it was she who convinced Oscar to allow the left wing Johan Sverdrup to form a Norwegian government: "Her influence over the King was great and well known. She was as firm as he was weak, as calm as he was unstable and nervous. Until March 1884 she supported him in his resistance, but in April 1884 she changed strategy and realized that resistance would only damage the monarchy. As early as that, she told the King to support Johan Sverdrup."

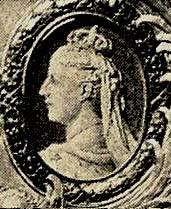
Sofia crowned

During the union crisis of 1895, when the Norwegians wished to have their own embassies, the royal family had a family council at the sick bed of the queen in the presence of the German Emperor William II. William recommended united German-Swedish military intervention, but Sophia firmly forbade anything of the sort, told the Emperor that he did not understand the situation and advocated friendly negotiations. During the crisis of 1898, the Norwegians began to use their own flag, Oscar II threatened to abdicate and Prime Minister Boström to resign. The queen calmed the situation and convinced them both to remain at their posts. Queen Sophia is credited with using her influence to prevent military intervention and war during the dissolution of the union Sweden-Norway in 1905.

== Queen dowager ==
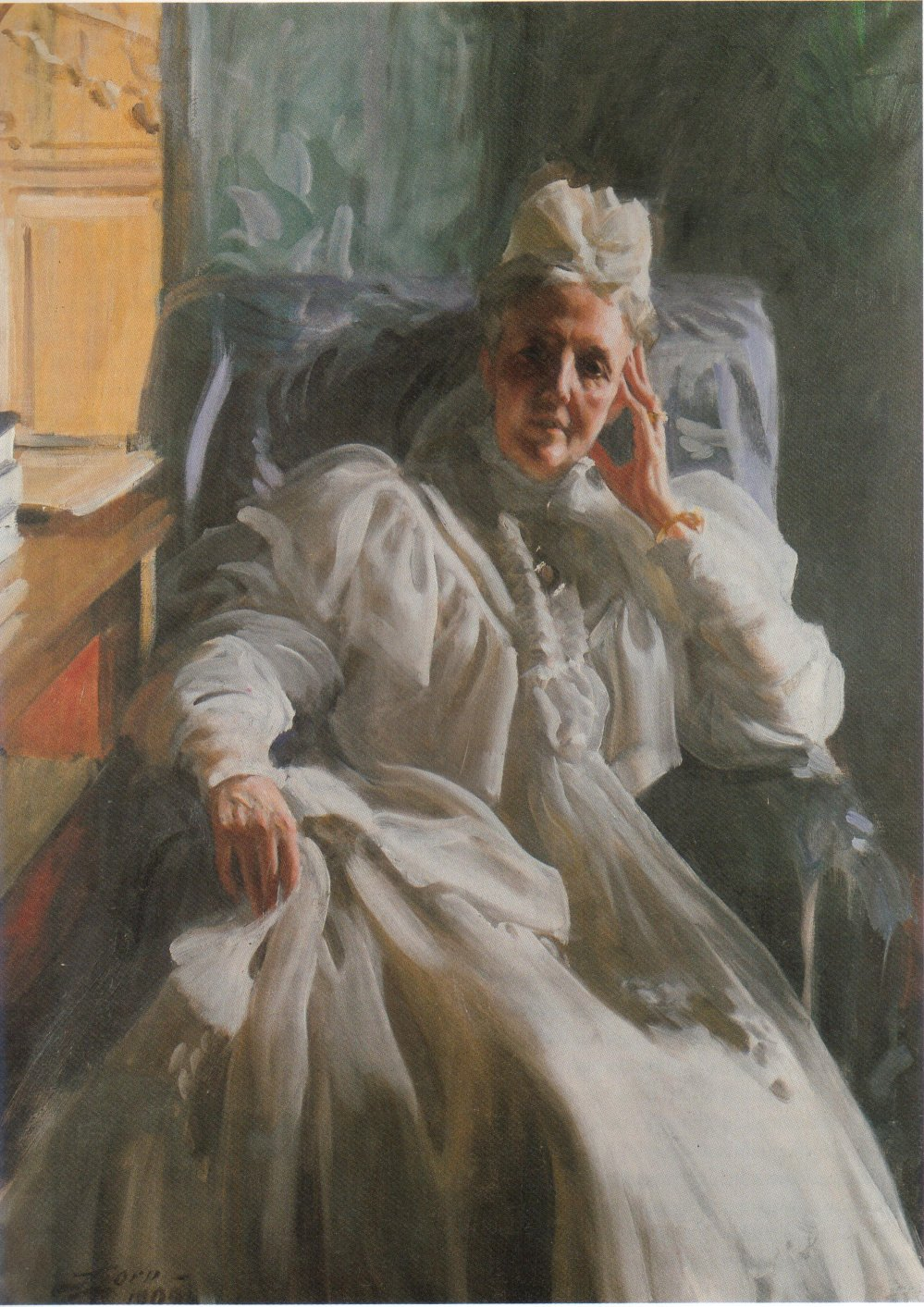
Sophia of Nassau as queen dowager by Anders Zorn (1909)

In 1907, Oscar II died and she became queen dowager. Though she no longer could exert any influence upon the affairs of state, she kept herself updated on politics. The dissolution of the union Sweden-Norway meant she no longer visited Norway, but she continued her trips to Great Britain and the continent: in 1909, for example, she visited Germany by car. She spent her last years engaging in philanthropy and in the Sophiahemmet, where she continued to be the acting chairperson. Her last official assignment was the exam celebration of the nurses at Sophiahemmet, one of whom was her granddaughter Maria Bernadotte, daughter of Prince Oscar and Ebba Munck: when the turn came to Maria, Sophia forgot her words and embraced her. She died a few days later, on 30 December 1913.

Queen Sophia believed in the view of Queen Victoria of the United Kingdom: that the private life of a royal person should be a good example for her subjects, and she was a respected figure in this aspect.

== Children ==
Sophia's children were:

- King Gustav V (1858–1950; r. 1907–1950), ancestor of Carl XVI Gustaf of Sweden and Frederik X of Denmark
- Prince Oscar, Duke of Gotland, later Count Oscar Bernadotte af Wisborg (1859–1953)
- Prince Carl, Duke of Västergötland (1861–1951), ancestor of Harald V of Norway, Henri, Grand Duke of Luxembourg, and Philippe of Belgium
- Prince Eugén, Duke of Närke (1865–1947)

Sophia was the half-sister of Adolphe, Grand Duke of Luxembourg (who was also the last reigning Duke of Nassau), who created the title Count of Wisborg in the Luxembourgish nobility for Sophia's son Oscar, who lost his succession rights and titles by marrying without the King's consent.

== Honours, arms and monogram ==
=== Honours ===
- Russian Empire: Dame of the Order of Saint Catherine 1st Class, 1857
- Spain: Dame of the Order of Queen Maria Luisa, 24 March 1883
- United Kingdom: Honorary Lady of Justice of St. John

=== Arms and monogram ===
Coat of arms of Sophia as queen of Sweden and Norway (1872–1905)	Royal Monogram of Queen Sophia of Sweden	Coat of arms of Sophia as queen of Sweden

== Ancestry ==
Ancestors of Sophia of Nassau

8. Charles Christian, Prince of Nassau-Weilburg
4. Frederick William, Prince of Nassau-Weilburg
9. Princess Carolina of Orange-Nassau
2. William, Duke of Nassau
10. Wilhelm Georg of Sayn-Hachenburg, Burgrave of Kirchberg
5. Burgravine Louise Isabelle of Kirchberg
11. Princess Isabella Auguste Reuss of Greiz
1. Sophia of Nassau
12. Frederick I of Württemberg
6. Prince Paul of Württemberg
13. Duchess Auguste Karoline of Brunswick-Wolfenbüttel
3. Princess Pauline of Württemberg
14. Frederick, Duke of Saxe-Altenburg
7. Princess Charlotte of Saxe-Hildburghausen
15. Duchess Charlotte Georgine of Mecklenburg-Strelitz

== Notes ==
Sophia of Nassau House of Nassau-Weilburg Cadet branch of the House of Nassau Born: 9 July 1836 Died: 30 December 1913
Royal titles
Vacant Title last held by Louise of the Netherlands	Queen consort of Sweden; 1872–1907	Succeeded by Victoria of Baden
Vacant Title last held by Louise of the Netherlands	Queen consort of Norway; 1872–1905	Vacant Title next held by Maud of Wales
