= Karlskrona Residence =

Coordinates: 56°09′29″N 15°35′33″E

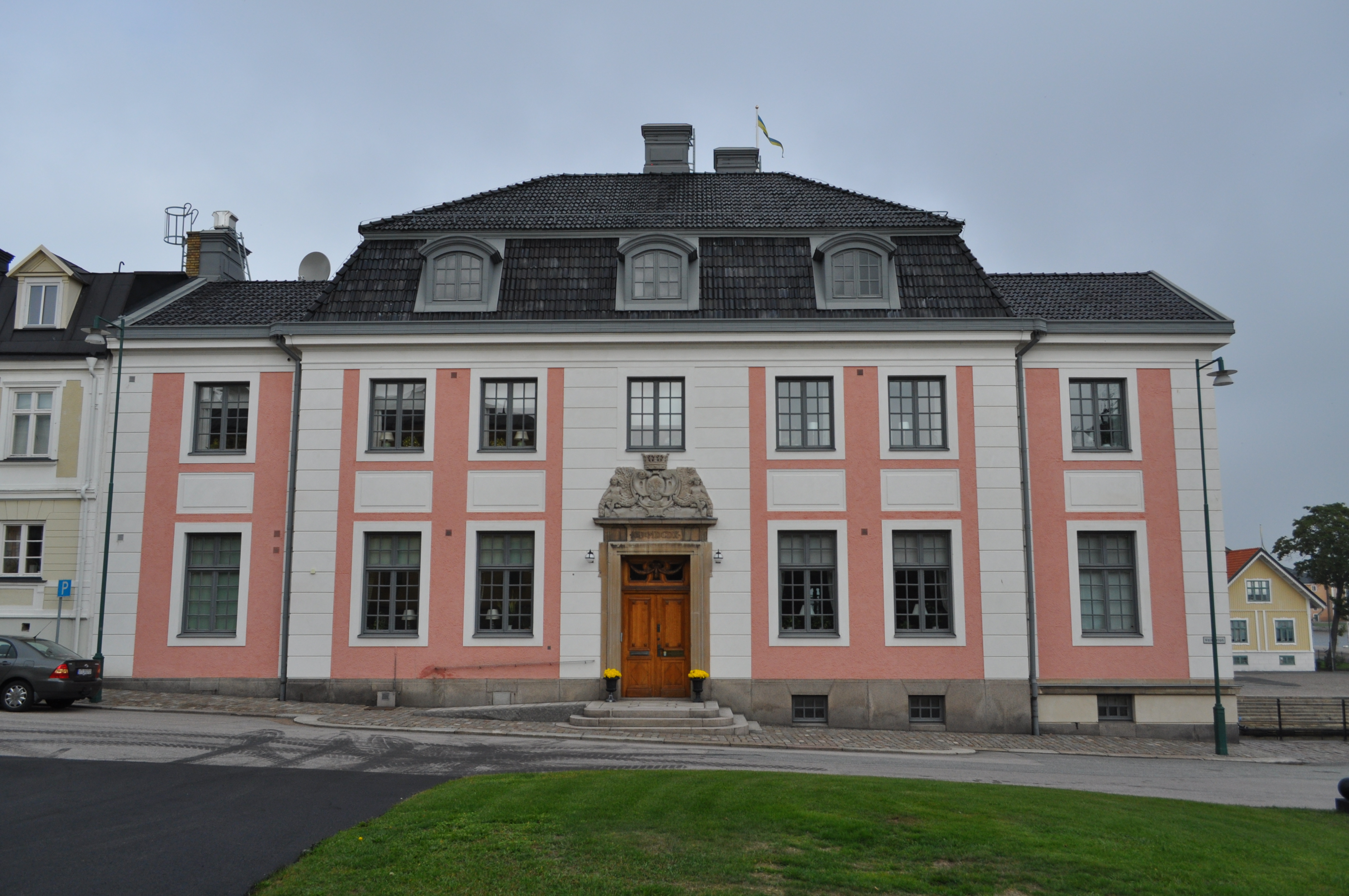
County residence of Karlskrona

The county residence in Karlskrona (Swedish: länsresidenset i Karlskrona) is the formal residence of the County Governor of Blekinge County, Sweden. It is located in central Karlskrona.

The residence is the most recently built among the formal residences of Swedish county governors. It was built in 1911 and stylistically somewhat inspired by contemporary English architecture. The building replaced an earlier residence, in another part of the city, which had been bought by the state in 1832. The current residence was erected on a plot of land owned by Prince Oscar Bernadotte. A renovation of the building was carried out 2001–2002.
