= Oscar II =

King of Sweden (1872–1907) and Norway (1872–1905)

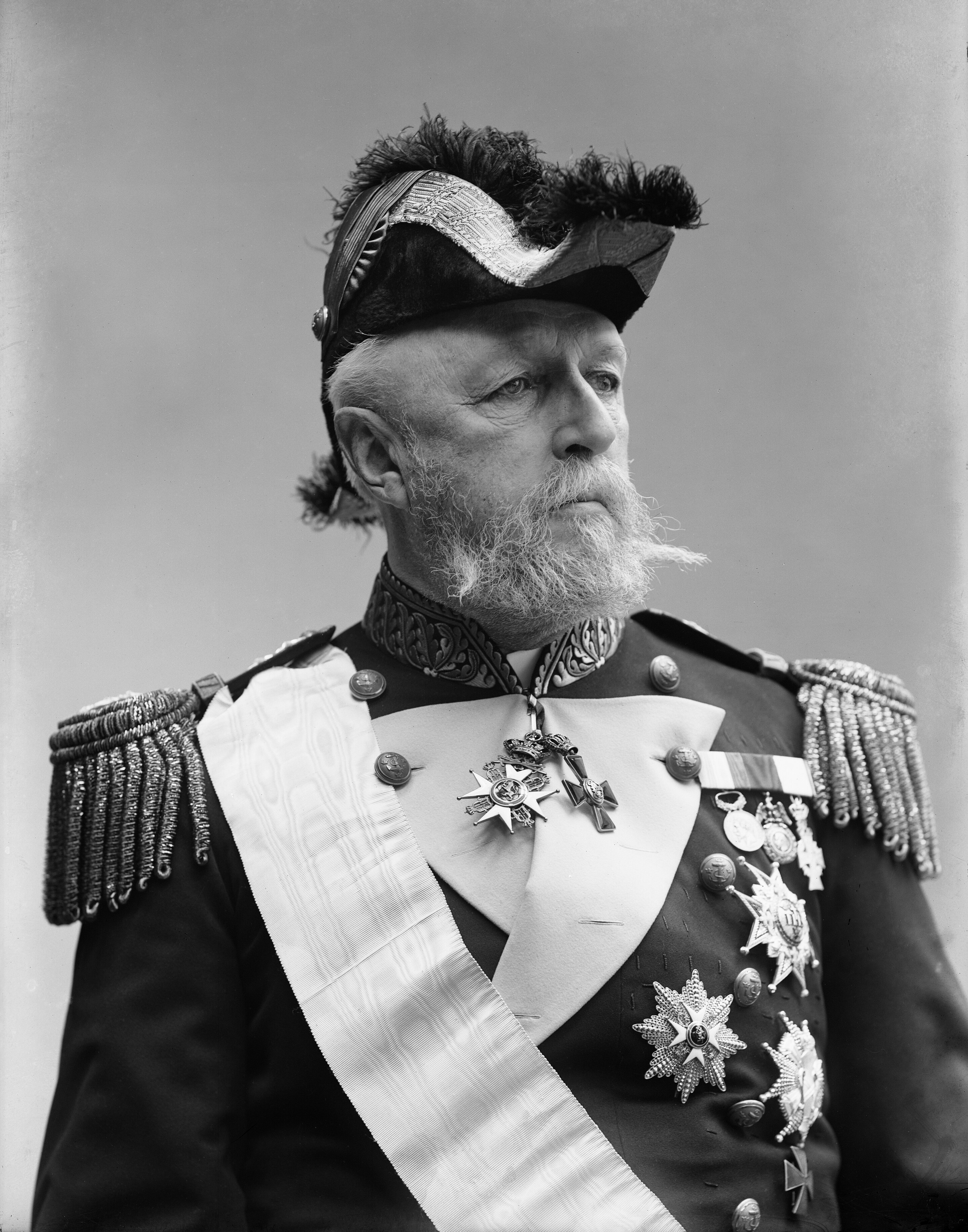
- Official portrait, c. 1900–1907

King of Sweden
- Reign: 18 September 1872 – 8 December 1907
- Coronation: 12 May 1873
- Predecessor: Charles XV
- Successor: Gustaf V

King of Norway
- Reign: 18 September 1872 – 7 June 1905
- Coronation: 18 July 1873
- Predecessor: Charles IV
- Successor: Haakon VII
- Born: 21 January 1829; Stockholm Palace, Stockholm, Sweden
- Died: 8 December 1907 (aged 78); Stockholm Palace, Stockholm, Sweden
- Burial: 19 December 1907; Riddarholm Church
- Spouse: Sophia of Nassau (m. 1857)
- Issue: Gustaf V; Prince Oscar Bernadotte; Prince Carl, Duke of Västergötland; Prince Eugen, Duke of Närke
Names
- Oscar Fredrik
- House: Bernadotte
- Father: Oscar I of Sweden
- Mother: Josephine of Leuchtenberg
- Religion: Lutheran
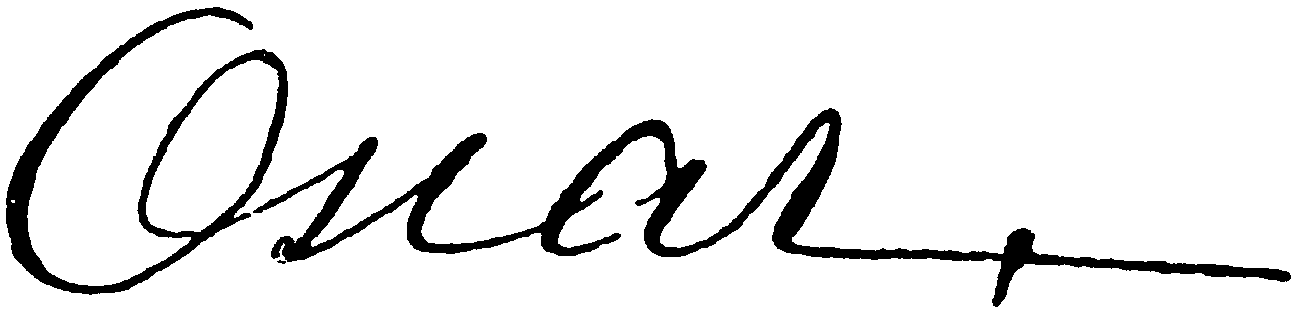
- Signature
- Education: Uppsala University

Oscar II (Note: He himself used the spelling Oscar, and since his death, spelling practices have varied between this and Oskar.) (Oscar Fredrik; 21 January 1829 – 8 December 1907) was King of Sweden from 1872 until his death in 1907 and King of Norway from 1872 to 1905.

Oscar was the son of King Oscar I and Queen Josephine. He inherited the Swedish and Norwegian thrones when his brother died in 1872. Oscar II ruled during a time when both countries were undergoing a period of industrialization and rapid technological progress. His reign also saw the gradual decline of the Union of Sweden and Norway, which culminated in its dissolution in 1905. In 1905, the throne of Norway was transferred to his grandnephew Prince Carl of Denmark under the regnal name Haakon VII. When Oscar died in 1907, he was succeeded in Sweden by his eldest son, Gustaf V.

== Early life ==
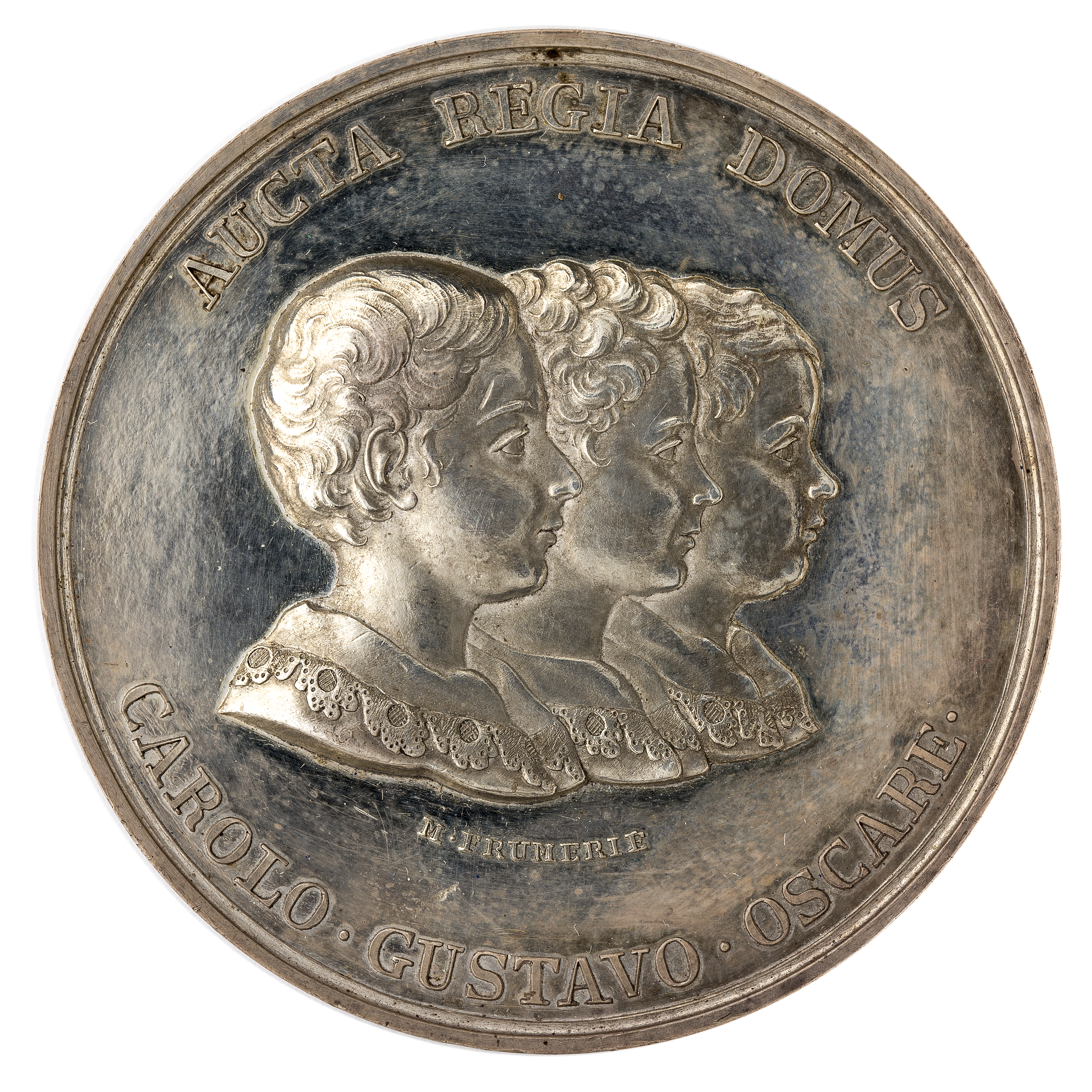
Mauritz Frumerie's 1829 medal showing the three eldest sons of Crown Prince Oscar: Charles, Gustaf, and Oscar.

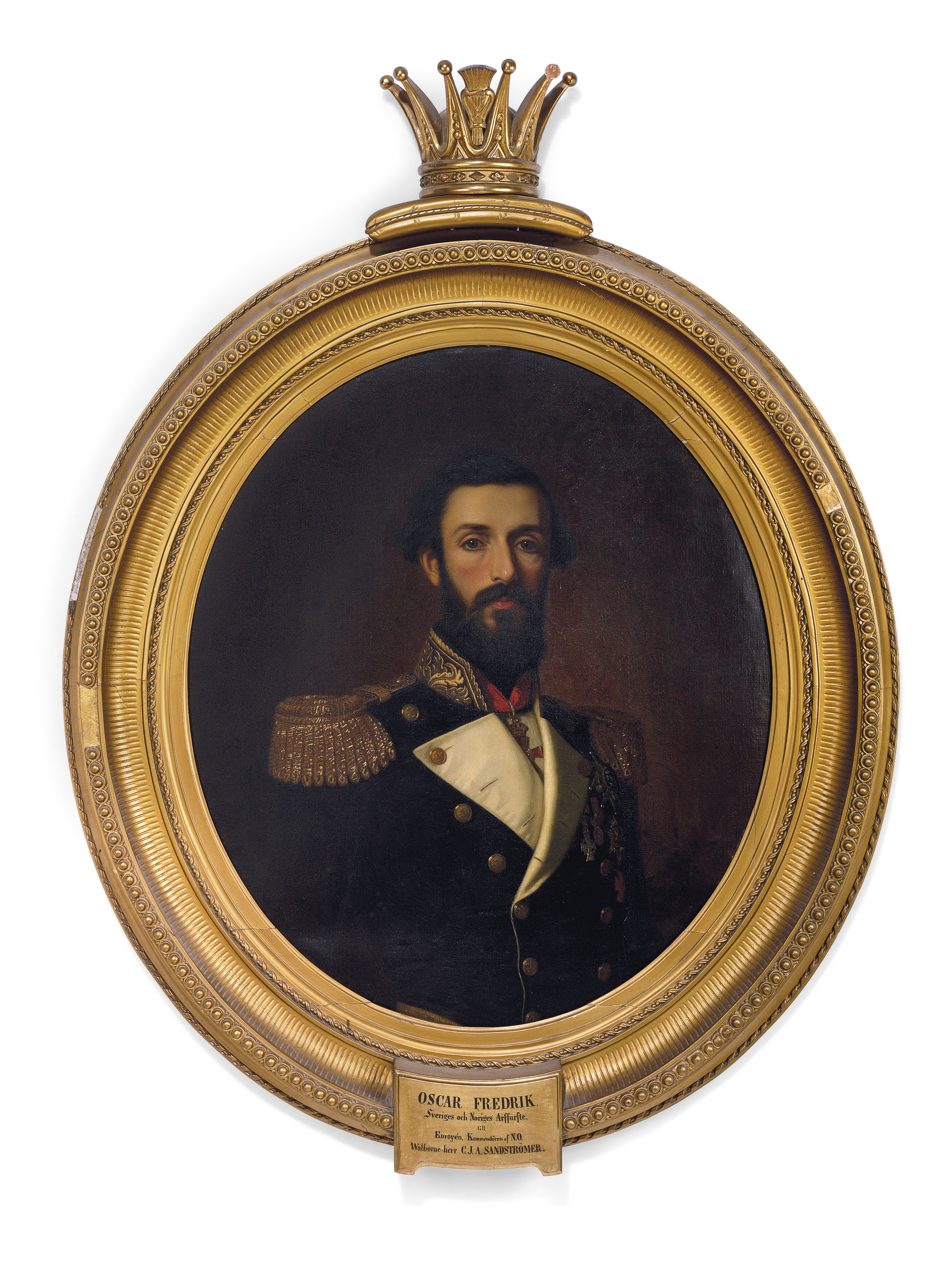
Portrait of Crown Prince Oscar Fredrik

Oscar Fredrik was born at the Royal Palace in Stockholm on 21 January 1829, the third of four sons of Crown Prince Oscar and Josephine of Leuchtenberg. Upon his birth, he was created Duke of Östergötland. At birth, he was fourth in the succession to the Swedish throne after his father and older brothers, but as a younger son had no immediate prospect of inheriting the throne. During his childhood, he was placed in the care of the royal governess, Countess Christina Ulrika Taube.

Prince Oscar entered the Royal Swedish Navy as a midshipman at the age of 11, and was appointed junior lieutenant in July 1845. Later, he studied at Uppsala University, where he distinguished himself in mathematics. On 13 December 1848, was made an honorary member of the Royal Swedish Academy of Sciences.

On 6 June 1857, Prince Oscar married Princess Sophia of Nassau at the Biebrich Palace, the ducal residence of the Duchy of Nassau, with whom he had four sons. Princess Sophia was the youngest daughter of Wilhelm, Duke of Nassau and Princess Pauline Friederike Marie of Württemberg, and a half-sister of Adolphe, the then reigning Duke of Nassau and future Grand Duke of Luxembourg.

Upon the death of his father, King Oscar I, in 1859, Prince Oscar became heir presumptive to the thrones of Sweden and Norway, as his eldest brother King Charles XV of Sweden/Charles IV of Norway was without a legitimate heir, having lost his only son, Prince Carl Oscar, Duke of Södermanland, to pneumonia in 1854. His second elder brother, Prince Gustaf, Duke of Uppland, had died of typhoid fever already in 1852.

== King of Sweden and Norway ==
=== Accession ===
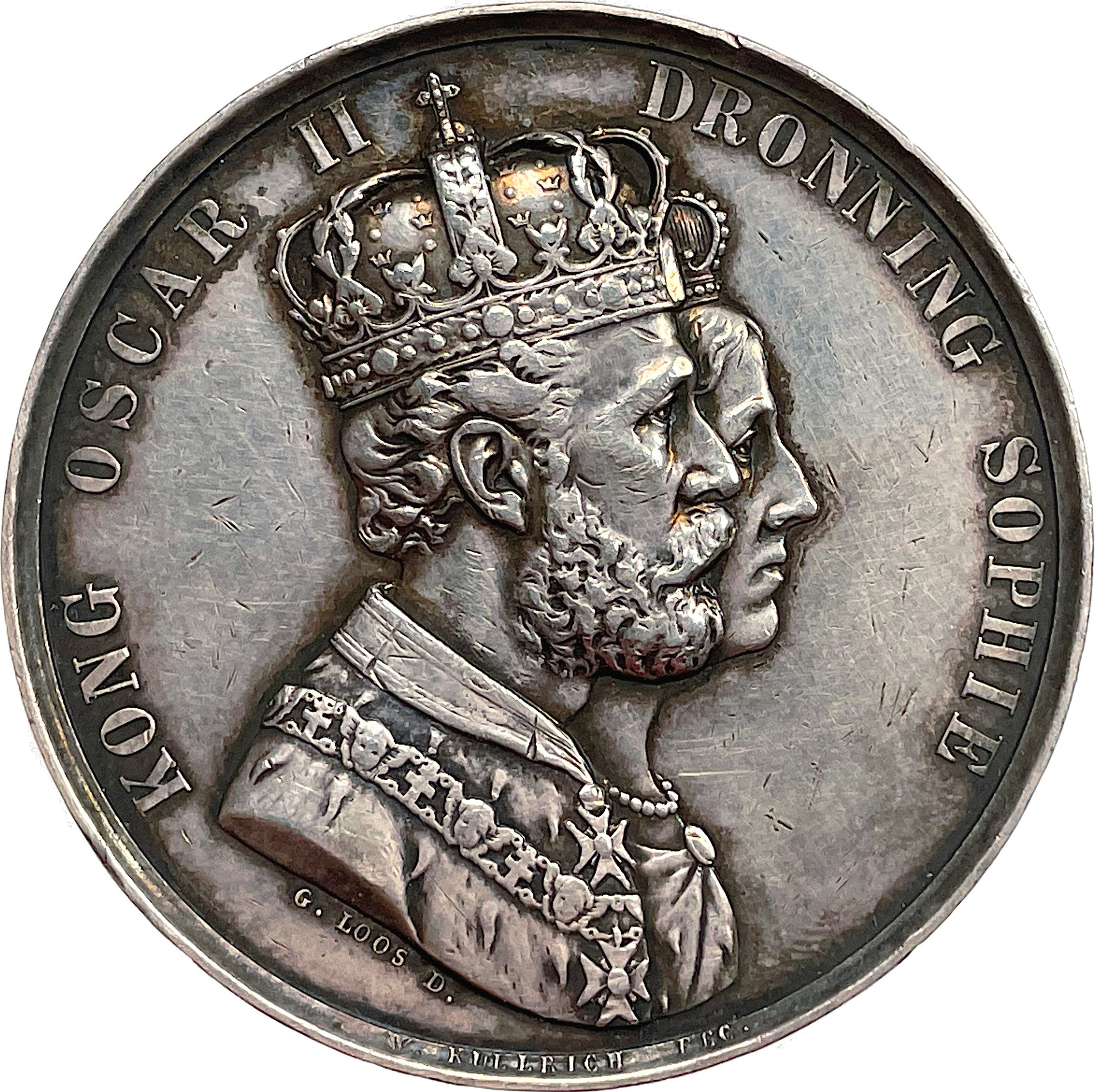
Norwegian coronation medal for Oscar II and Sophia

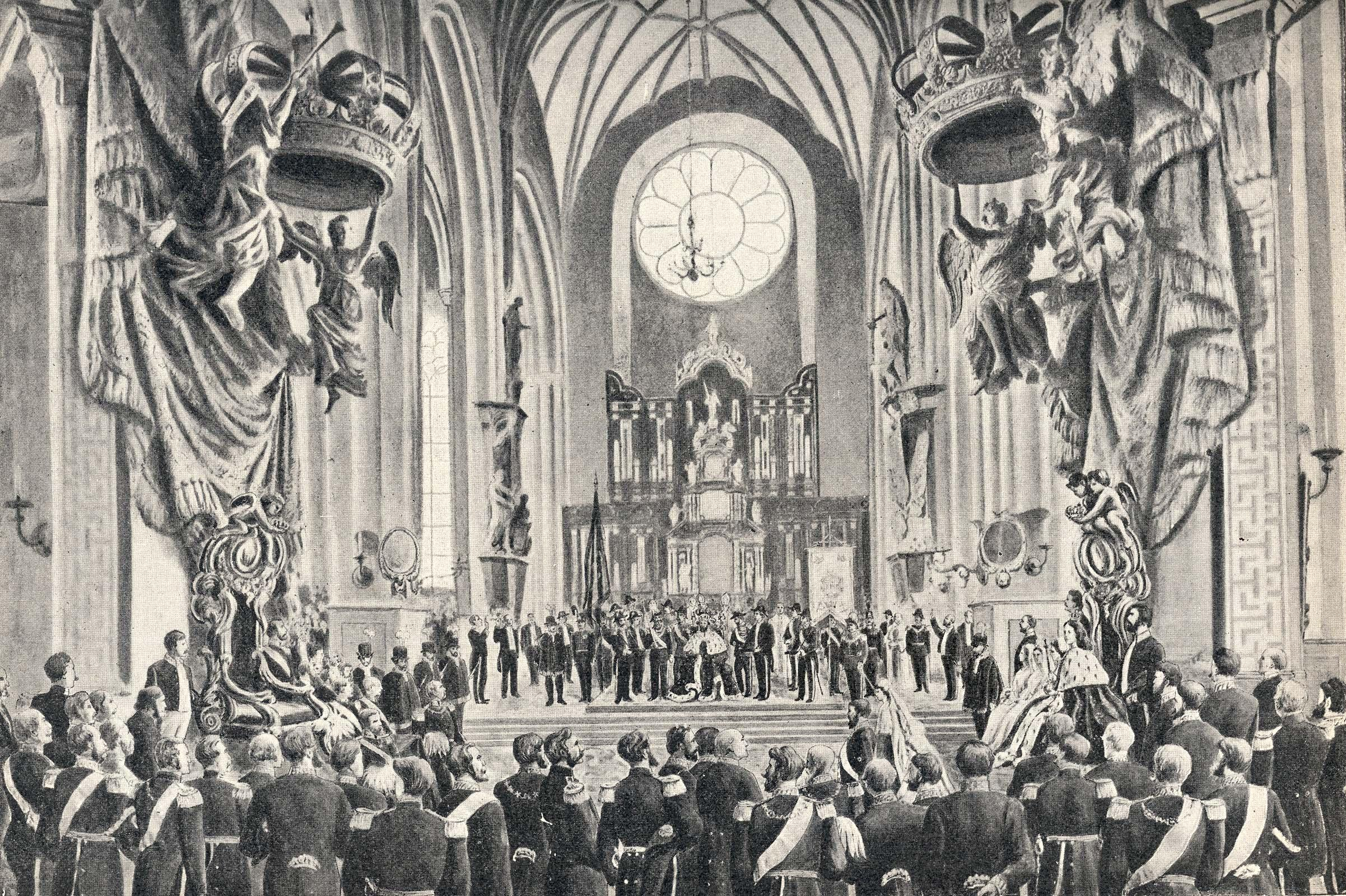
King Oscar II and Queen Sophia of Sweden and Norway at their Swedish coronation

Oscar II became King on 18 September 1872, upon the death of his brother, Charles XV who died without an heir. At his accession, he adopted as his motto Brödrafolkens väl / Broderfolkenes Vel ("The Welfare of the Brother Peoples"). His coronation as Swedish monarch was celebrated in Storkyrkan in Stockholm on 12 May 1873, and his coronation as Norwegian monarch two months later in the Nidaros Cathedral in Trondheim on 18 July 1873. While the King, his family and the Royal Court resided mostly in Sweden, Oscar II made the effort of learning to be fluent in Norwegian and from the very beginning realized the essential difficulties in the maintenance of the union between the two countries.

=== Foreign and domestic statecraft ===
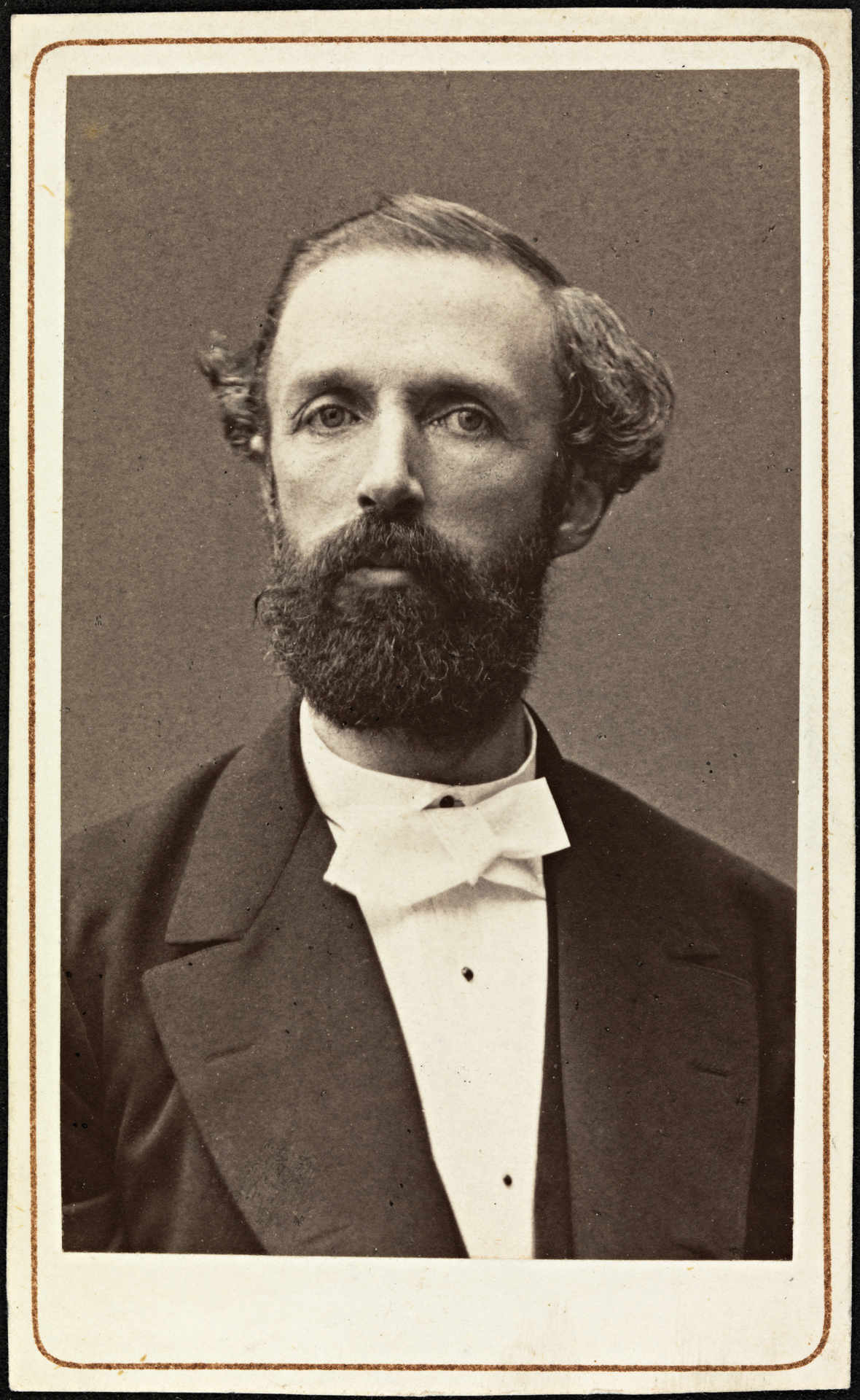
Photograph of Oscar II, c. 1870s

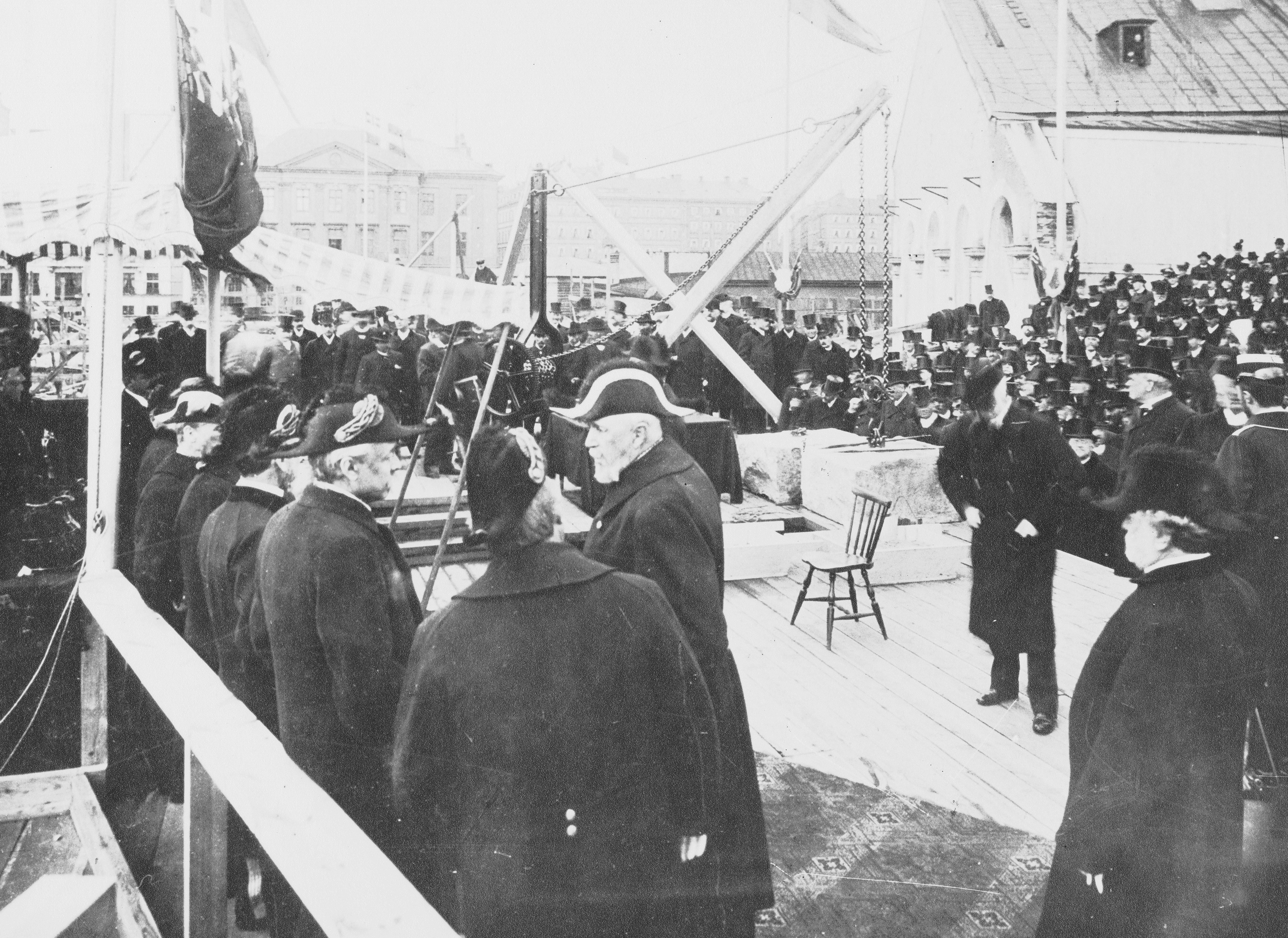
Oscar II at the laying of the foundation stone of the Riksdag Building, 13 May 1897

Oscar II at his desk c. 1900

His acute intelligence and his aloofness from the dynastic considerations affecting most European sovereigns (both his paternal and maternal grandfathers were French military commanders who served under Napoleon I) gave the king considerable weight as an arbitrator in international questions. At the request of the United Kingdom, Germany, and the United States in 1889, he appointed the Chief Justice of Samoa under the Treaty of Berlin, and he was again called on to arbitrate in Samoan affairs in 1899.

In 1897, he was empowered to appoint a fifth arbitrator if necessary in the Venezuelan dispute, and he was called on to act as umpire in the Anglo-American arbitration treaty that was quashed by the United States Senate. He won many friends in the United Kingdom by his outspoken and generous support of Britain at the time of the Second Boer War (1899–1902), expressed in a declaration printed in The Times of 2 May 1900, when continental opinion was almost universally hostile.

1898 painting of the steamship Oscar II by A. Emanuel

He remained a strong supporter of the Navy throughout his life, and frequently visited ships of the fleet. When the coastal defence ship Oscar II was launched, he even signed his name on the vessel's aft main gun tower.

The office of Prime Minister of Sweden was instituted in 1876. Louis De Geer became the first head of government in Sweden to use this title. The most known and powerful first minister of the Crown during the reign of Oscar was the conservative estate owner Erik Gustaf Boström. Boström served as prime minister in 1891–1900 and 1902–1905. He was trusted and respected by Oscar II, who had much difficulty approving someone else as prime minister. Over a period of time, the King gave Boström a free hand to select his own ministers without much royal involvement. It was an arrangement (unintentional by both the King and Boström) that furthered the road to parliamentarism.

=== Science and the arts ===
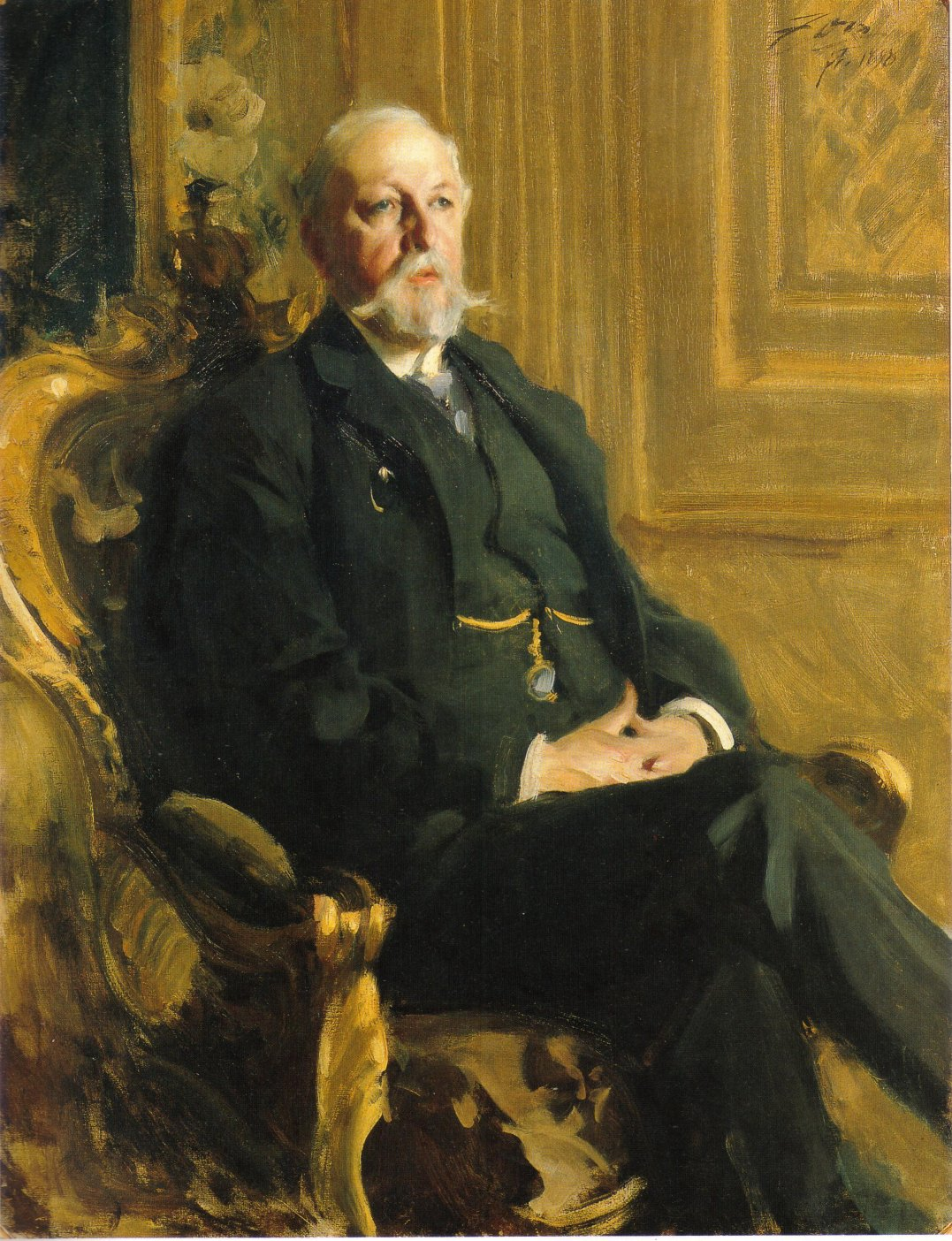
Portrait of Oscar II by Anders Zorn 1898

An 1898 etching of King Oscar II aboard the royal yacht Drott in Marstrand by Anders Zorn

A distinguished writer and musical amateur himself, King Oscar did much to encourage the development of education throughout his dominions. In 1858, a collection of his lyrical and narrative poems, Memorials of the Swedish Fleet, published anonymously, obtained the second prize of the Swedish Academy. His "Contributions to the Military History of Sweden in the Years 1711, 1712, 1713", originally appeared in the Annals of the academy, and were printed separately in 1865. His works, which included his speeches, translations of Herder's Cid and Goethe's Torquato Tasso, and a play, Castle Cronberg, were collected in two volumes in 1875–76, and a larger edition, in three volumes, appeared in 1885–88.

His Easter hymn and some other of his poems are familiar throughout the Scandinavian countries. His work on Charles XII of Sweden were translated into English in 1879. In 1881, he founded the world's first open-air museum, at Bygdøy, located next to his summer residence near Oslo (then known as Christiania). In 1885, he published his Address to the Academy of Music, and a translation of one of his essays on music appeared in Literature in May 1900. He had a valuable collection of printed and manuscript music, which was readily accessible to the historical student of music.

Being a theater lover, he commissioned a new opera house to be built by Axel Anderberg for the Royal Swedish Opera which was inaugurated on 19 September 1898. It remains as the home of that institution. Oscar II once told playwright Henrik Ibsen that his Ghosts was "not a good play". As he was dying, he requested that the theatres not be closed on account of his death. His wishes were respected.

Oscar was also particularly interested in mathematics. In 1887, he set up a contest, to be awarded on the occasion of his 60th birthday in 1889, for "an important discovery in the realm of higher mathematical analysis". The contest listed four potential areas of research, one of which was the n-body problem in celestial mechanics, relevant to the stability of the Solar System. Henri Poincaré, a professor at the University of Paris, won by submitting an entry showing that even the 3-body problem was unstable, the seminal result in what is now called chaos theory.

King Oscar II was an enthusiast of Arctic exploration. Along with Swedish millionaire Oscar Dickson and Russian magnate Aleksandr Mikhaylovich Sibiryakov, he was the patron of a number of pioneering Arctic expeditions in the 1800s. Among the ventures the king sponsored, the most important are Adolf Erik Nordenskiöld's explorations to the Russian Arctic and Greenland, and Fridtjof Nansen's Polar journey on the Fram.

Oscar was also a generous sponsor of the sciences and personally funded the Vega Expedition, which was the first Arctic expedition to navigate through the Northeast Passage, the sea route between Europe and Asia through the Arctic Ocean, and the first voyage to circumnavigate Eurasia.

== Death ==
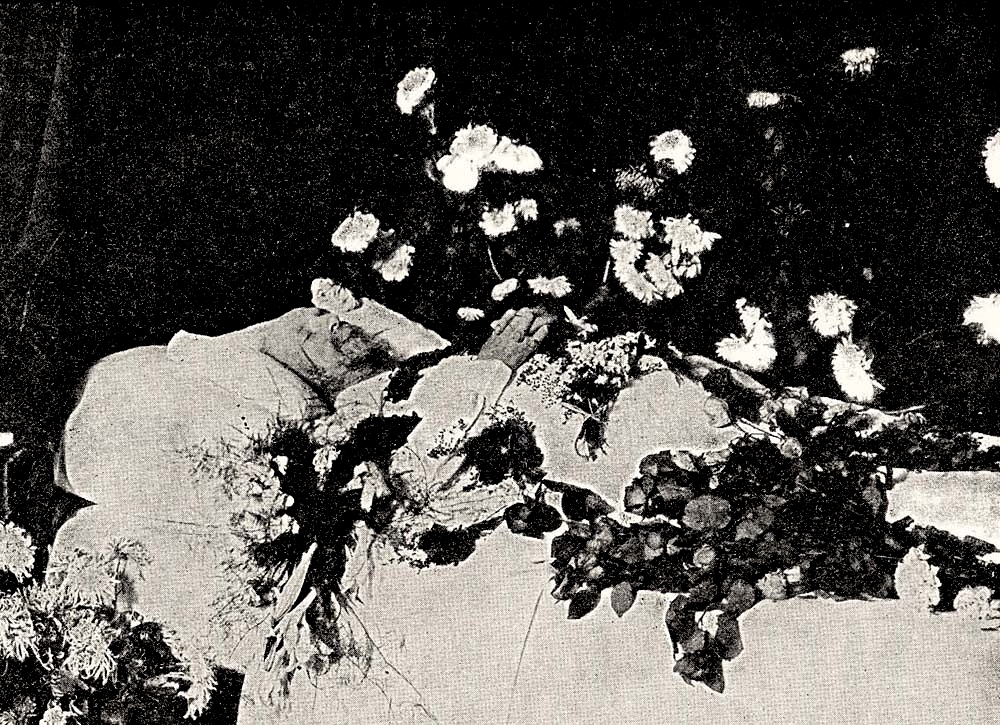
Oscar on his deathbed, 1907

The political events which led up to the peaceful dissolution of the union between Norway and Sweden in 1905 could hardly have been attained but for the tact and patience of the king himself. He was dethroned on 7 June 1905 by the Storting and renounced the Norwegian throne on 26 October. He declined, indeed, to permit any prince of his house to become king of Norway, but better relations between the two countries were restored before his death. Oscar II died in Stockholm on 8 December 1907 at 9:10 am.

== Marriage and children ==
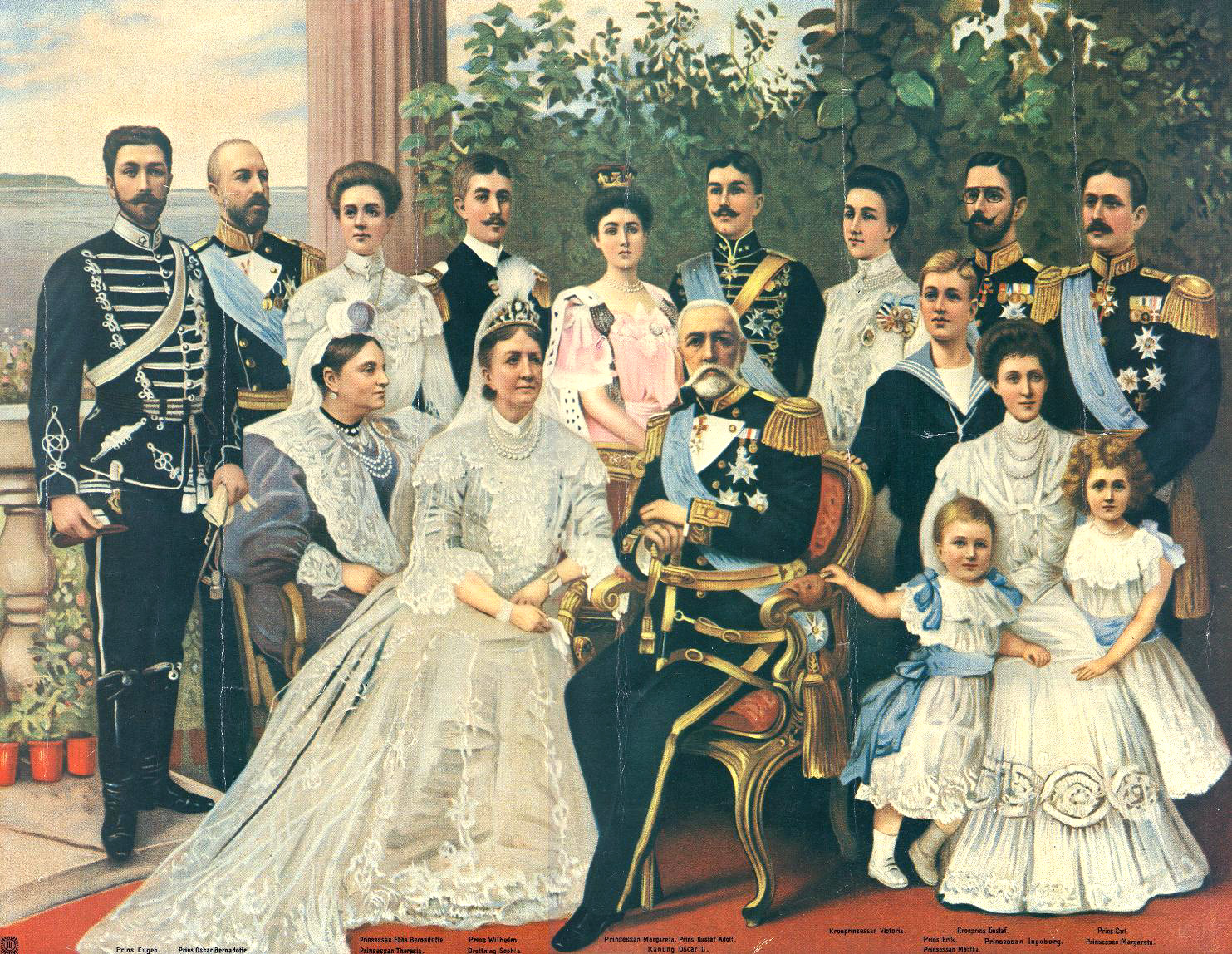
King Oscar II and family

On 6 June 1857, he married in Wiesbaden-Biebrich, Duchy of Nassau (located in present-day Hessen, Germany) Princess Sophia Wilhelmina, the youngest daughter of Duke William of Nassau and his second wife, Princess Pauline of Württemberg. They had four sons:

1. King Gustaf V (16 June 1858 – 29 October 1950)
2. Prince Oscar, Duke of Gotland, later known as Prince Oscar Bernadotte, Count of Wisborg (15 November 1859 – 4 October 1953)
3. Prince Carl, Duke of Västergötland (27 February 1861 – 24 October 1951)
4. Prince Eugen, Duke of Närke (1 August 1865 – 17 August 1947)

His eldest son Gustaf was Duke of Värmland and succeeded him as King Gustaf V of Sweden from 1907 until 1950, married Princess Victoria of Baden and they had three sons, including Gustaf VI Adolf. His second son, Prince Oscar, lost his rights of succession to the throne upon his unequal marriage in 1888 to a former lady-in-waiting, Ebba Munck af Fulkila, and was granted the title of Prince Bernadotte first in Sweden, and from 1892 in Luxembourg, where he also was created Count of Wisborg as an hereditary title for his marital progeny (Adolphe, Grand Duke of Luxembourg, was the half-brother of his mother, Queen Sophia). The other sons of Oscar II were Prince Carl, Duke of Västergötland who married Princess Ingeborg of Denmark; and Prince Eugén, Duke of Närke, who was well known as an artist and remained a bachelor all his life.

=== Alleged extramarital children ===
Oscar II is also suspected to have had several extramarital children, of which at least five are named:

- Anna Hofman-Uddgren (1868–1947) by Emma Hammarström (1849–1910)
- Elin Esping Smitz (1878–1960) by Paulina Mathilda Esping (1858–1878)
- Knut August Ekstam (born 1878, in U.S.A. 1903, death unknown) by Marie Friberg (1852–1934)
- Florence Stephens (1881–1979) by Elisabeth Kreüger Stephens (1858–1911)
- Nils Teodor Ekstam (1889–1954) also by Friberg above

However, unlike his father, Oscar II never officially recognized any illegitimate children of his.

== Honours ==
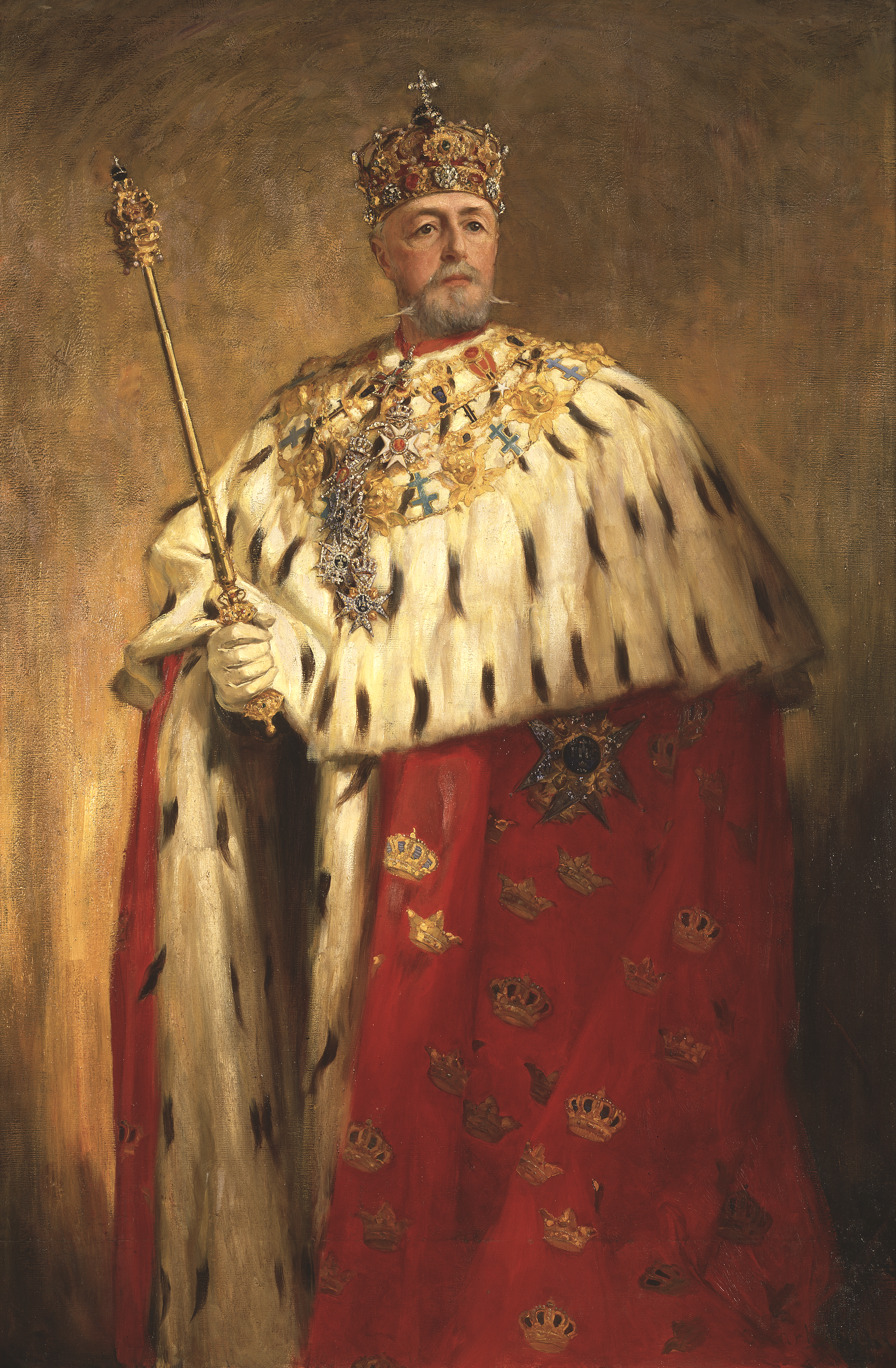
Portrait of Oscar II wearing the Crown of Eric XIV and mantle, by Oscar Björck. King Oscar II was the last crowned Swedish king and was known to enjoy the pomp and ceremony.

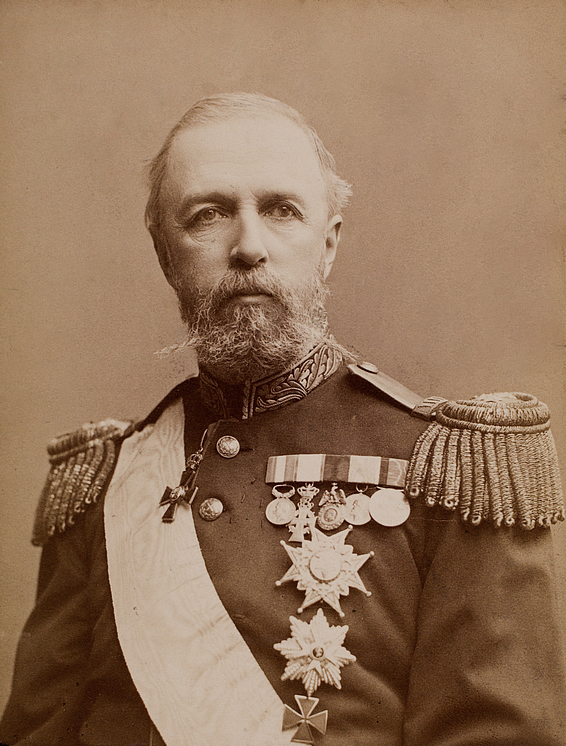
Photograph of Oscar II by Gösta Florman, c. 1891

National

- Knight and Commander of the Seraphim, 21 January 1829
- Knight of the Order of Charles XIII, 21 January 1829
- Commander Grand Cross of the Sword, 21 January 1829
- Commander Grand Cross of the Polar Star, 21 January 1829
- Commander Grand Cross of the Order of Vasa, 15 June 1866
- Grand Cross of St. Olav, with Collar, 21 August 1847
- Founder and Master of the Order of the Norwegian Lion, 21 January 1904 – 26 October 1905

Foreign

- (Duchy of Anhalt) Anhalt: Grand Cross of the Order of Albert the Bear
- Austria: Grand Cross of the Royal Hungarian Order of St. Stephen, 1866
- Baden:
  - Knight of the House Order of Fidelity, 1877
  - Knight of the Order of Berthold the First, 1877
- Bavaria: Knight of St. Hubert, 1862
- Belgium: Grand Cordon of the Order of Leopold, 17 May 1856
- Brazil: Grand Cross of the Southern Cross
- Denmark:
  - Knight of the Elephant, 3 June 1848
  - Cross of Honour of the Order of the Dannebrog, 5 October 1863
- France:
  - Honour medal for Courage and Devotion, 23 March 1862
  - Grand Cross of the Legion of Honour
  - Gold Médaille militaire
- Greece: Grand Cross of the Redeemer
- Hanover: Grand Cross of the Royal Guelphic Order, 1852
- Hawaii: Grand Cross of the Order of Kamehameha I
- Hesse-Darmstadt: Grand Cross of the Ludwig Order, 20 September 1881
- Italy: Knight of the Annunciation, 10 January 1862
- Japan: Grand Cordon of the Order of the Chrysanthemum, 27 July 1881
- Mecklenburg: Grand Cross of the Wendish Crown, with Crown in Ore
- Monaco: Grand Cross of St. Charles, 16 January 1862
- Nassau: Knight of the Gold Lion of Nassau, July 1858
- Netherlands: Grand Cross of the Netherlands Lion
- Luxembourg: Grand Cross of the Oak Crown
- Ottoman Empire:
  - Order of Osmanieh, 1st Class
  - Order of Distinction
- Beylik of Tunis: Husainid Family Order
- Portugal:
  - Grand Cross of the Tower and Sword
  - Grand Cross of the Sash of the Three Orders
- Persia: House Order of the Imperial Effigy, 1st Class
- Prussia:
  - Knight of the Black Eagle, 28 September 1861; with Collar
  - Grand Cross of the Red Eagle
  - Grand Commander's Cross of the Royal House Order of Hohenzollern, 12 June 1875
- Romania:
  - Grand Cross of the Star of Romania
  - Grand Cross of the Crown of Romania
- Russia:
  - Knight of St. Andrew, 9 July 1846
  - Knight of St. Alexander Nevsky
  - Knight of the White Eagle
  - Knight of St. Anna, 1st Class
  - Knight of St. Stanislaus, 1st Class
- Saxony: Knight of the Rue Crown, 1875
- Saxe-Weimar-Eisenach: Grand Cross of the White Falcon, 26 May 1862
- Serbia: Grand Cross of the Cross of Takovo
- (Thailand) Siam:
  - Knight of the Order of the Royal House of Chakri, 29 October 1888
  - Grand Cross of the White Elephant
- Spain: Knight of the Golden Fleece, 14 July 1872
- United Kingdom: Stranger Knight Companion of the Garter, 17 May 1881
- Venezuela: Collar of the Order of the Liberator
- Württemberg: Grand Cross of the Württemberg Crown, 1879

== Legacy ==
The name and portrait of Oscar II have been used as a trademark for King Oscar sardines in Norway since 1902 (which remains the only brand to have once obtained his "royal permission") as well as gingerbread cookies (pepparkakor) and other bakery products made by Göteborgs Kex in Sweden.

The culinary creation Veal Oscar was named in his honor supposedly for his fondness for its ingredients: veal cutlet, crab meat, Béarnaise sauce, and asparagus.

== Heraldry ==
Heraldry of Oscar II of Sweden

Prince of Sweden and Norway and Duke of Östergötland (1829–1844)	Prince of Sweden and Norway and Duke of Östergötland (1844–1872)	King of Sweden and Norway (1872–1885)	King of Sweden and Norway (1885–1905)	Monogram of King Oscar II of Sweden	Arms of Oscar II, King of Sweden and Norway, as displayed on his Garter stall plate in St George's Chapel

== Notes ==
Oscar II House of Bernadotte Born: 21 January 1829 Died: 8 December 1907
Regnal titles
Preceded by Charles XV/IV	King of Sweden; 18 September 1872 – 8 December 1907	Succeeded by Gustav V
Preceded by Charles XV/IV	King of Norway; 18 September 1872 – 7 June 1905	Vacant Title next held by Haakon VII
Titles in pretence
Loss of title Dissolution of the union	— TITULAR — King of Norway; 7 June 1905 – 26 October 1905	Succeeded by Claim ended
