= Ebba Bernadotte =

Princess Ebba Bernadotte
- Princess Bernadotte, Countess of Wisborg
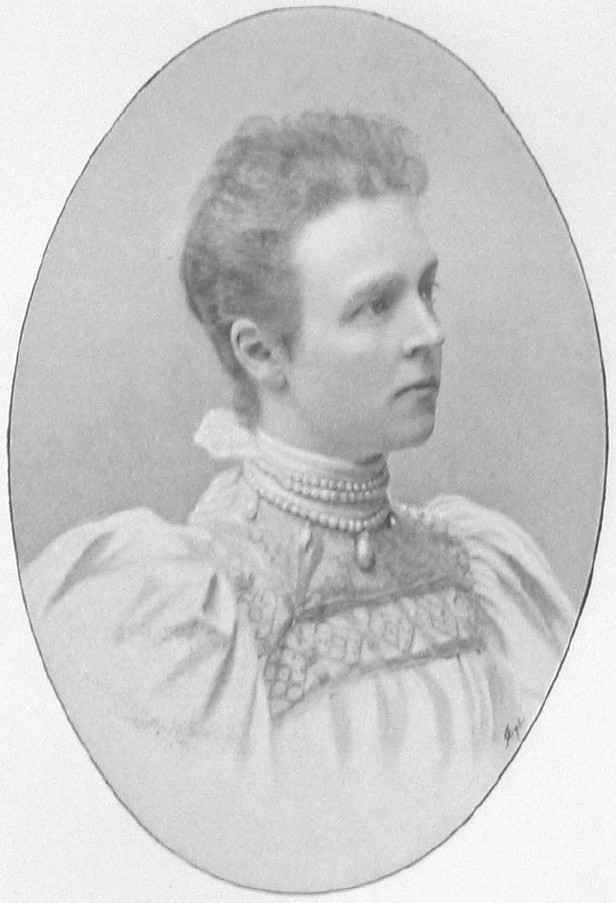
- Photo of Ebba, Princess Bernadotte
- Born: Ebba Henrietta Munck af Fulkila; October 24, 1858; Jönköping, Sweden
- Died: October 16, 1946 (aged 87); Malmsjö Gård, Grödinge, Sweden
- Spouse: Prince Oscar Bernadotte (m. 1888)
- Issue: Countess Maria; Count Carl Oscar; Ebba Sophia, Baroness Fleetwood; Countess Elsa, Mrs. Cedergren; Count Folke
- House: Munck af Fulkila
- Father: Carl Jacob Munck af Fulkila
- Mother: Baroness Henrika Ulrika Antoinetta Carolina Cederström

Princess Ebba Bernadotte (née Ebba Henrietta Munck af Fulkila; Jönköping, 24 October 1858 – Malmsjö Gård, Grödinge, 16 October 1946), was a Swedish noble, lady-in-waiting and a titular princess, the spouse of Prince Oscar Bernadotte.

== Life ==
She was the daughter of Finnish nobleman Colonel Carl Jacob Munck af Fulkila (Hyömäki, Somero, 17 March 1808 - Lund, 23 June 1882), third cousin once removed of Adolf Fredrik Munck, and his second wife (Karlskrona, 12 February 1855) Baroness Henrika Ulrika Antoinetta Carolina Cederström (Stockholm, 17 March 1819 - Stockholm, 21 January 1912), daughter of Baron Gustaf Albrekt Bror Cederström, 4th Baron of Beatelund, and wife Countess Christina Hilda Wachtmeister af Johannishus.

She served as lady-in-waiting to the Crown Princess, Victoria of Baden, who in 1885 visited her brother-in-law in Amsterdam, where he was to undergo a medical examination for a heart difficulty.

=== Marriage ===
Ebba and Oscar visited the Norwegian sailor church during their stay in Amsterdam and fell in love: Ebba was religious and influenced Oscar in this regard. When Oscar told his family that he wished to marry Ebba, they were scandalized and he was forced to take a two-year consideration period, and Ebba was dismissed as a lady-in-waiting. In 1887, Oscar told his family that he had not changed his mind, and the Royal House gave its consent to the marriage on condition that Oscar's brothers signed a document promising that they should never enter a similar marriage, which they did.

On 21 January 1888, a ball was arranged at the Royal Palace of Stockholm, where Ebba and Oscar were allowed to dance with each other, and on 29 January 1888, the engagement was formally announced. The match was regarded as a great sorrow within the royal house, but it received a lot of sympathy from the public. It was said that a bridge had been placed between the people and the Royal House: "The Munck bridge", and the fact that Oscar had to give up his royal title made people say that the King no longer had four sons but only three, as one of them "married and had to quit". When the couple left Stockholm, a large crowd had gathered on the train station to see them off and show their support.

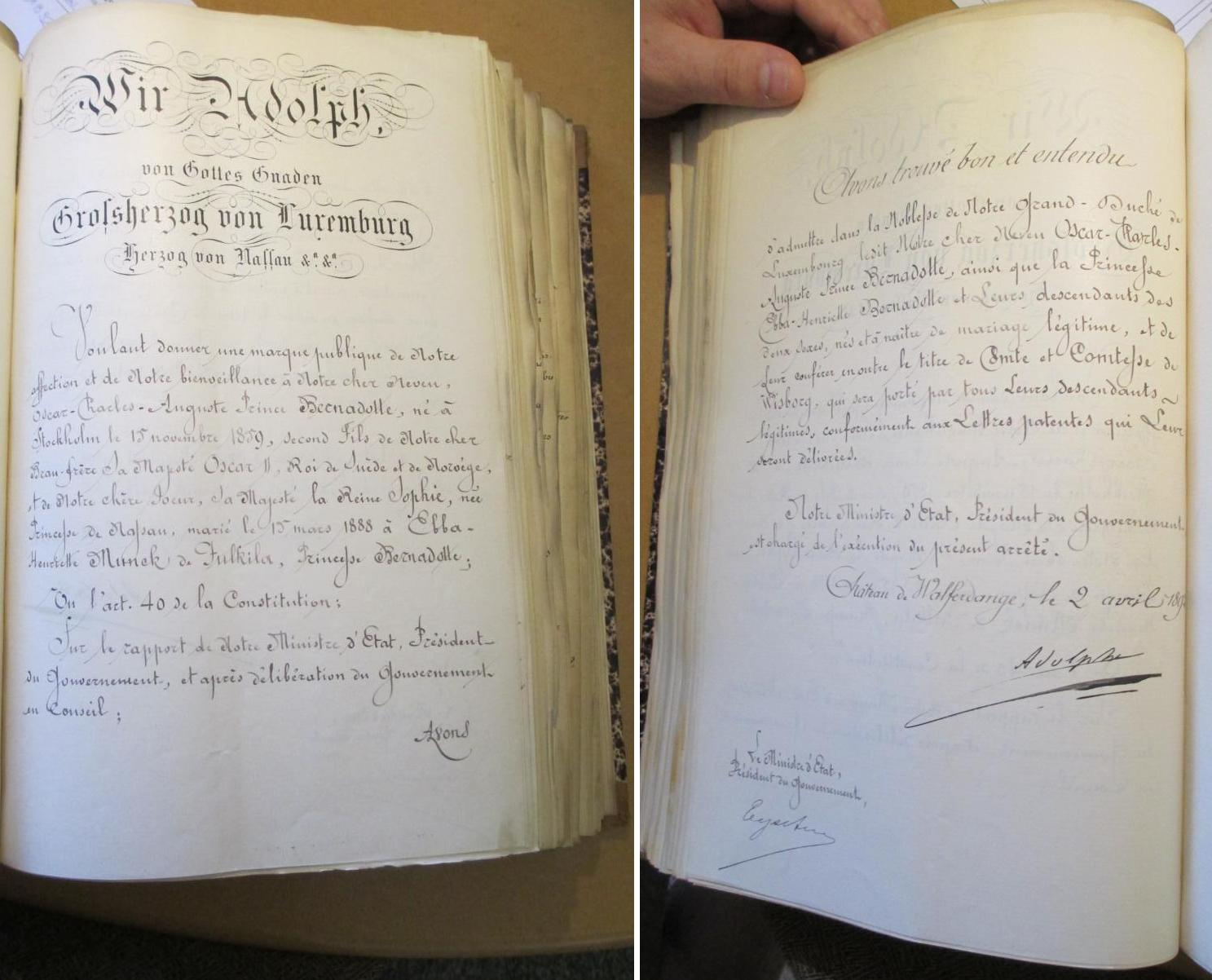
Letters patent of 1892 by the Head of State of Luxembourg admitting Princess Bernadotte, Countess of Wisborg (with those titles there) and husband and descendants to the nobility of Luxembourg

Ebba and Oscar were married 15 March 1888 in Saint Stephens Church in Bournemouth in England by the vicar Gustaf Beskow, who was close to the Queen, Sophia of Nassau, in the presence of Oscar's mother, Queen Sophia, two of his brothers, Prince Carl, Duke of Västergötland and Prince Eugen, Duke of Närke, and his cousin, the Danish Crown princess, Louise of Sweden, as well as Ebba's mother and brother. In Sweden she was given the unclarified title of "Princess Bernadotte" instead of the royal "Princess of Sweden".

=== Later life ===
After her marriage, Ebba Bernadotte devoted her life to Christian charity. The couple lived a simple life in Stockholm away from the royal court and was regarded with great sympathy due to the circumstances of their marriage. Their relationship was described as happy, and they devoted themselves to their common interests in religion and Christian influenced social work.

Ebba Bernadotte was a member of a number of different Christian charitable organisations: in 1894, she became a member of the Lapska missionens vänner ('Friends of the Sami Mission'), in 1897–1912 she was a board member of the Kristliga föreningens av unga kvinnor ('Christian Society For Young Women') and in 1900, she became chairperson of Bokpåsemissionen för sjömän ('Bookbag-Mission For Sailors'), which had its meetings in her home.
