= Oscar Bernadotte =

- Prince Bernadotte, Count of Wisborg
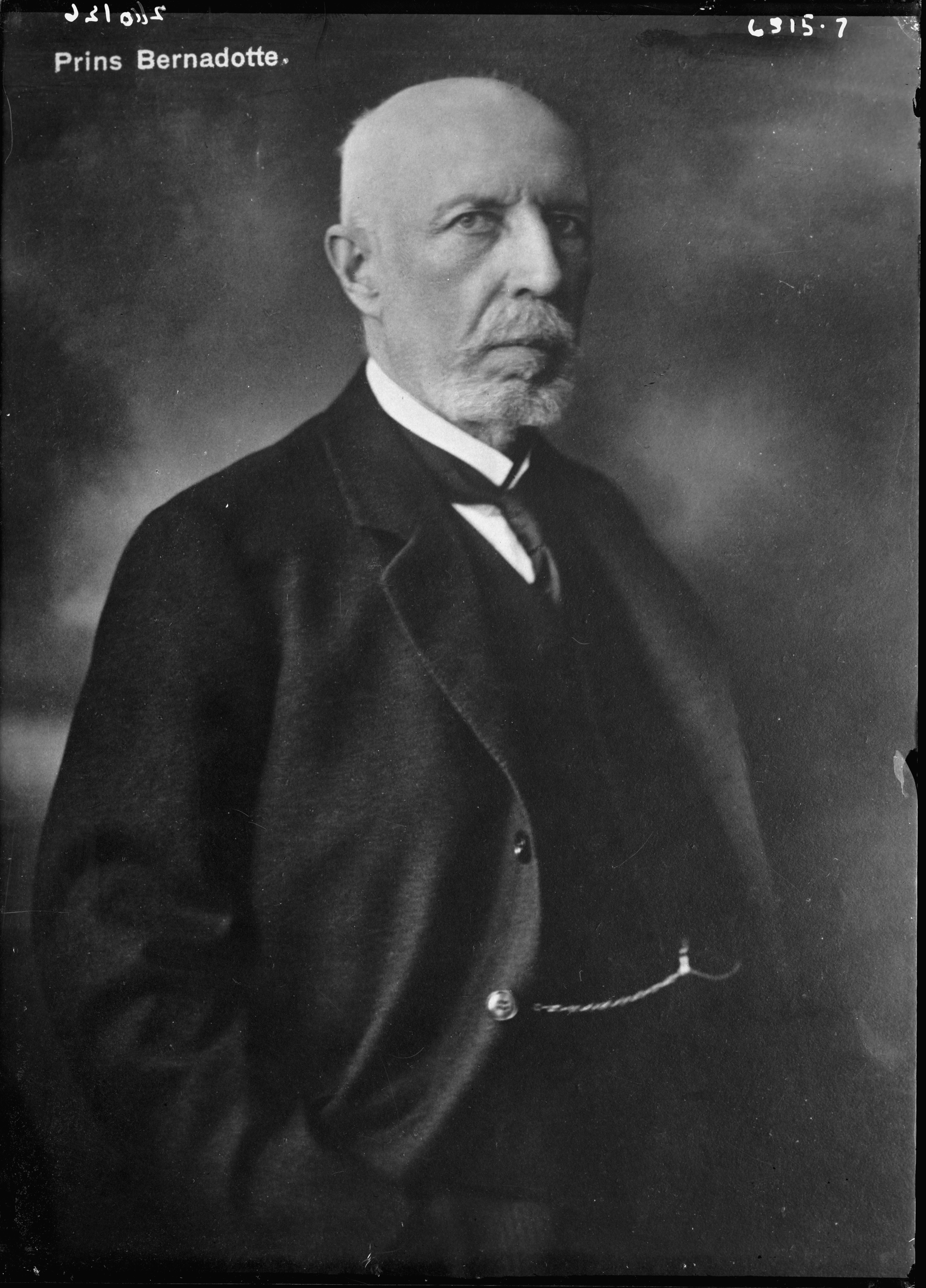
- Photograph of Prince Oscar, c. 1900
- Born: Prince Oscar, Duke of Gotland; 15 November 1859; Palace of the Hereditary Prince, Stockholm, Sweden
- Died: 4 October 1953 (aged 93); Stockholm, Sweden
- Spouse: Ebba Munck af Fulkila (m. 1888; died 1946)
- Issue: Countess Maria Bernadotte; Count Carl Oscar Bernadotte; Ebba Sophia, Baroness Fleetwood; Countess Elsa Bernadotte, Mrs. Cedergren; Count Folke Bernadotte
Names
- Oscar Carl August
- House: Bernadotte
- Father: Oscar II of Sweden
- Mother: Sophia of Nassau
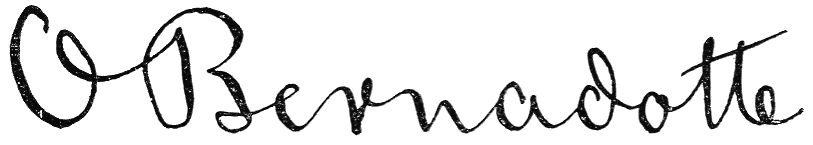
- Signature

Prince Oscar Carl August Bernadotte, Count of Wisborg (15 November 1859 – 4 October 1953) was a Swedish religious activist, the second son of King Oscar II of Sweden and his consort, Sofia of Nassau. Born as a Prince of Sweden and Norway, he was known as Prince Oscar, Duke of Gotland. However, by marrying contrary to Swedish constitutional requirements, he lost those titles, becoming instead Luxembourgish nobility as Prince Bernadotte and Count of Wisborg.

== Career ==
Prince Oscar, before his marriage, served in the Swedish Navy, where he was enlisted for 25 years and attained the rank of Vice Admiral. In his youth, he visited the United States several times, beginning in 1876, and sailed around the world from 1883 to 1885 on the Vanadis.

Bernadotte was very active in social organizations, especially religious ones, such as the YMCA of Sweden and Friends of Mission to the Laps, both of which he chaired for many years. As the only member of Swedish royalty known to be born again, he founded the Södertälje Conferences, as inspired by the Keswick Convention, in 1898 and was an engaging inter-denominational Christian lay preacher of wide repute.

== Title ==
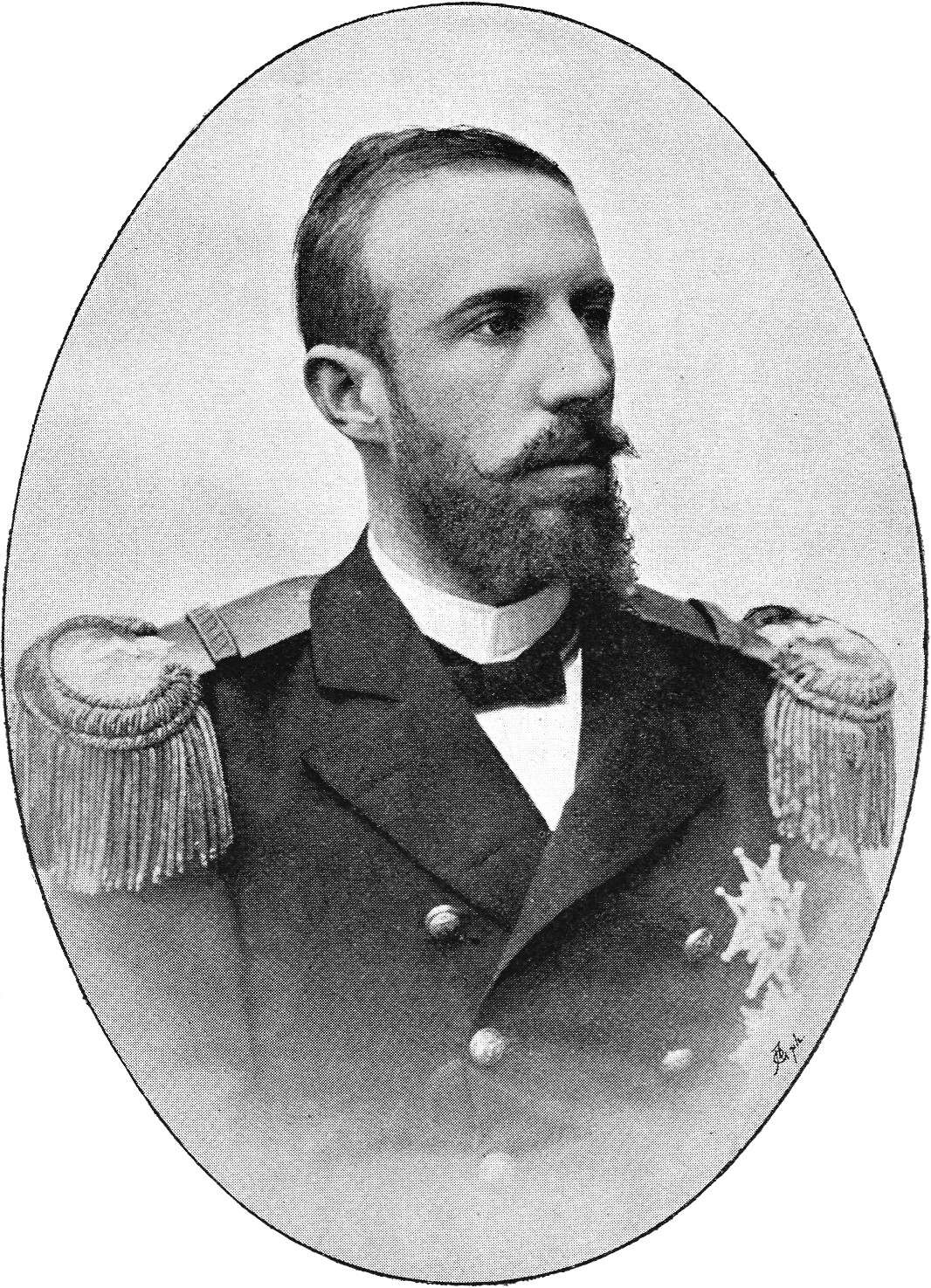
Photograph of Prince Oscar

Through Oscar's marriage in Bournemouth on 15 March 1888 to Swedish noblewoman Ebba Munck af Fulkila, lady-in-waiting to the Crown Princess, without the consent of his father, the King, he gave up his right of succession to the Swedish throne and his royal title.

Ebba was a lady-in-waiting of the crown princess, Victoria of Baden, who in 1885 visited her brother-in-law in Amsterdam, where he was to undergo a medical examination. Ebba and Oscar visited the Norwegian sailor church during their stay in Amsterdam and fell in love: Ebba was religious and influenced Oscar in this regard. When Oscar told his family that he wished to marry Ebba, they were scandalized. He was forced to take a two-year consideration period, and Ebba was dismissed as a lady-in-waiting. In 1887, Oscar told his family that he had not changed his mind, and the royal house gave its consent to the marriage on condition that Oscar's brothers signed a document promising that they should never enter a similar marriage, which they did. On 21 January 1888, a ball was arranged at the Royal Palace of Stockholm, where Ebba and Oscar were allowed to dance with each other, and on 29 January 1888, the engagement was formally announced. The match was regarded as a great sorrow within the royal house, but it received a lot of sympathy from the public. It was said that a bridge had been placed between the people and the royal house, "The Munck bridge", and the fact that Oscar had to give up his royal title made people say that the king no longer had four sons but only three, as one of them "married and had to quit". When the couple left Stockholm, a large crowd had gathered at the train station to see them off and show their support.

They were married on 15 March 1888 in St Stephen's Church at Bournemouth in England by the vicar Gustaf Beskow, who was close to the queen, Sofia of Nassau, in the presence of Oscar's mother, Queen Sophia, two of his brothers (Prince Carl, Duke of Västergötland, and Prince Eugen, Duke of Närke), his cousin the Danish crown princess Louise of Sweden, as well as the mother and brother of Ebba.

He and his wife were named with new titles as Prince and Princess Bernadotte as of their wedding day. It has never been determined if that was a Swedish title of nobility or another form of unofficial courtesy title (such as some later dynasty members have been given). On 2 April 1892, he and his wife were given personal noble titles as Prince and Princess Bernadotte when admitted into the nobility of Luxembourg by Oscar's uncle Adolphe, Grand Duke of Luxembourg, previously Duke of Nassau, and also then given a Luxembourgish hereditary title as Count and Countess of Wisborg. Wisborg was derived from Visborg, castle ruins in Oscar's former Duchy of Gotland.

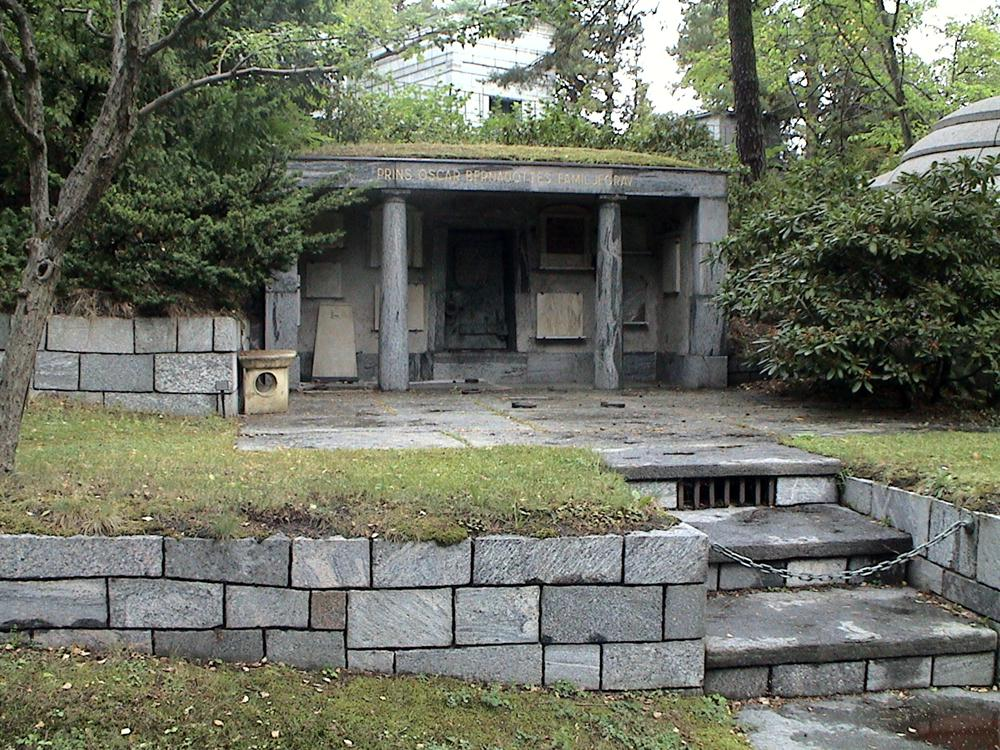
Bernadotte's family grave north of Stockholm, where the remains of his assassinated son Folke Bernadotte also are interred

The Prince Couple, as they were called, at first lived in Karlskrona, but in 1892 moved to Stockholm and remained there. They maintained summer residences at Villa Fridhem in Gotland and Malmsjö Manor in Sudermania.

== Personal life ==
His wife was the daughter of Carl Jacob Munck af Fulkila (1808–1882) and his spouse, Baroness Henrika Ulrika Antoinetta Carolina Cederström (1819–1912).

They had five children:

- Countess Maria Sophie Henrietta Bernadotte af Wisborg (1889–1974)
- Count Carl Oscar Bernadotte af Wisborg (1890–1977)
- Ebba Sofia Fleetwood (1892–1936)
- Elsa Victoria Cedergren (1893–1996)
- Count Folke Bernadotte af Wisborg (1895–1948)

He was the last surviving son of Oscar II.

== Honours and arms ==
=== Honours ===
Swedish and Norwegian honours

- Knight and Commander of the Seraphim, 15 November 1859
- Knight of the Order of Charles XIII, 15 November 1859
- Grand Cross of St. Olav, with Collar
- King Oscar II and Queen Sofia's Golden Wedding Medal
- King Oscar II's Jubilee Commemorative Medal
- Crown Prince Gustaf V and Crown Princess Silver Wedding Medal
- King Gustaf V's Jubilee Commemorative Medal (1928)
- King Gustaf V's Jubilee Commemorative Medal (1948)

Foreign honours

- Denmark: Knight of the Elephant, 20 July 1880
- (Greece) Greek Royal Family: Grand Cross of the Redeemer
- Monaco: Grand Cross of St. Charles
- (Kingdom of Portugal) Portuguese Royal Family: Grand Cross of the Tower and Sword
- (Russian Empire) Russian Imperial Family:
  - Knight of St. Andrew
  - Knight of St. Alexander Nevsky
  - Knight of the White Eagle
  - Knight of St. Anna, 1st Class
  - Knight of St. Stanislaus, 1st Class
- Luxembourg: Grand Cross of Adolphe of Nassau
- (Austria-Hungary) Austro-Hungarian Imperial and Royal Family: Grand Cross of St. Stephen, 1885
- (Empire of Brazil) Brazilian Imperial Family: Grand Cross of the Southern Cross
- (Hawaiian Kingdom) Hawaiian Royal Family: Knight's Grand Cross of the Royal Order of Kalākaua, 1884
- (German Empire) German Imperial and Royal Family:
  - Knight of the Black Eagle
  - Grand Cross of the Red Eagle
  - (Grand Duchy of Baden) Baden Grand Ducal Family:
    - Knight of the House Order of Fidelity, 1881
    - Knight of the Order of Berthold the First, 1881
  - (Saxe-Weimar-Eisenach) Saxe-Weimar Grand Ducal Family: Grand Cross of the White Falcon, 1881
- Empire of Japan: Grand Cordon of the Order of the Chrysanthemum, 3 September 1884
- (Thailand) Siam:
  - Knight of the Order of the Royal House of Chakri, 13 July 1897
  - Grand Cross of the Crown of Siam
- Belgium: Grand Cordon of the Royal Order of Leopold I
- (Tunisia) Tunisian Royal Family: Order of the Fundamental Pact
- (Ottoman Empire) Turkish Imperial Family:
  - Order of Osmanieh, 1st Class
  - Gold and Silver Imtiyaz Medals

=== Arms ===
Arms as Prince of Sweden and Norway,
Duke of Gotland

Oscar's arms as
Count of Wisborg (1892)

== Ancestry ==
Ancestors of Oscar Bernadotte

8. Charles XIV John of Sweden
4. Oscar I of Sweden
9. Désirée Clary
2. Oscar II of Sweden
10. Eugène de Beauharnais, Duke of Leuchtenberg
5. Princess Josephine of Leuchtenberg
11. Princess Augusta of Bavaria
1. Prince Oscar, Duke of Gotland
12. Frederick William, Prince of Nassau-Weilburg
6. William, Duke of Nassau
13. Burgravine Louise Isabelle of Kirchberg
3. Princess Sophia of Nassau
14. Prince Paul of Württemberg
7. Princess Pauline of Württemberg
15. Princess Charlotte of Saxe-Hildburghausen
