= Count of Wisborg =

Title granted by the Monarch of Luxembourg

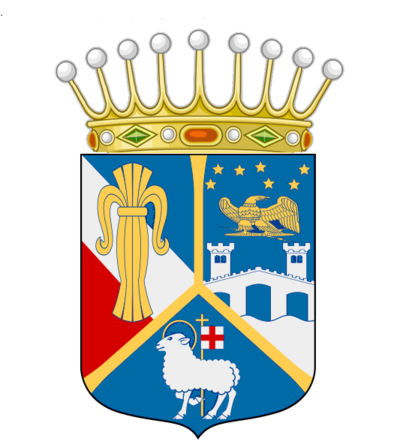
Coat of arms

The Count of Wisborg (Swedish: Greve af Wisborg, French: Comte de Wisborg, German: Graf von Wisborg) is a title of nobility granted by the Monarch of Luxembourg to some male-members of the Swedish royal family, including their spouses and descendants. Since 1892, the title has been borne by the male-line descendants of four Princes of Sweden who married without the consent of the King of Sweden, thereby losing their right of succession to the throne for themselves and their descendants, and had their royal titles prohibited.

The four former Princes of Sweden, after use of their titles no longer was allowed, assumed the surname of Bernadotte. In each case they were given the title of nobility Prince Bernadotte, Count of Wisborg by the reigning Grand Duke or Grand Duchess of Luxembourg. The latter title (count or countess) was shared with the children of each prince, since subsequent generations in the male line were authorized to bear only the title "Count of Wisborg", Bernadotte being recognized as their surname by birth. In some cases, this titulature has not been adhered to, usage of the style Count [Firstname] Bernadotte af Wisborg having been adopted by some of the descendants.

Their legitimate titles of nobility, however, have not been Swedish but Luxembourgish. In Sweden, none of these title holders were admitted to the Swedish House of Nobility. However, Prince Oscar was admitted in 1945 and his son Carl in 1963 as an honorary member of the Sveriges Ointroducerade Adels Förening (Association of the unintroduced nobility in Sweden), which brings together the bearers of non-Swedish titles living in Sweden.

== The original four Counts of Wisborg ==
Four original princes of Sweden were admitted in the nobility of the Grand Duchy of Luxembourg and given the title Count of Wisborg:

=== First creation (1892–present) ===
- Prince Oscar, Duke of Gotland (1859–1953), second son of King Oscar II of Sweden. He married morganatically and gave up his Swedish titles on March 15, 1888. He and his wife were invested with the new titles of Prince and Princess Bernadotte on their wedding day. It has never been determined if this was a Swedish title of nobility or another form of unofficial courtesy title (such as some later dynasty members have been given by Swedish kings). On 2 April 1892, named as Oscar Prince Bernadotte, he was also given a hereditary title as Count of Wisborg by his uncle Adolphe, Grand Duke of Luxembourg, previously Duke of Nassau. Oscar's mother, Queen Sofia of Sweden, was a half-sister of Grand Duke Adolphe. The choice of the Wisborg title was because Oscar was formerly Duke of Gotland and the castle of Visborg (then spelled Wisborg) is in Gotland.

=== Extended creation (1951–present) ===
- Prince Lennart, Duke of Småland (1909–2004), only son of Prince Wilhelm, Duke of Södermanland and a grandson of King Gustaf V of Sweden. He married morganatically and had his Swedish titles prohibited on March 11, 1932. He was given the same titles as his granduncle Oscar by Grand Duchess Charlotte of Luxembourg on July 2, 1951. Lennart styled himself in no other language than German, and then as Prof. Dr. h.c. mult. Lennart Graf Bernadotte af Wisborg (Professor and multiple honorary doctor Lennart Count Bernadotte of Wisborg).
- Prince Sigvard, Duke of Uppland (1907–2002), second son of King Gustaf VI Adolf of Sweden. He married morganatically and had his Swedish titles prohibited on March 8, 1934. He was given the same titles as his cousin Lennart simultaneously by Grand Duchess Charlotte of Luxembourg on July 2, 1951. On May 28, 1983 Sigvard in Sweden formally announced his title as Prince Sigvard Bernadotte. His nephew King Carl XVI Gustaf of Sweden has consistently declined to respond and his court has refused to use that title for his uncle.
- Prince Carl Johan, Duke of Dalarna (1916–2012), fourth son of King Gustaf VI Adolf of Sweden. He married morganatically and relinquished his Swedish titles on February 19, 1946. He was ennobled just as his brother Sigvard by Grand Duchess Charlotte of Luxembourg on July 2, 1951. He was the last surviving great-grandchild of Queen Victoria of the United Kingdom.

A fifth prince of Sweden, Prince Carl, Duke of Östergötland (1911–2003), only son of Prince Carl, Duke of Västergötland and grandson of King Oscar II, married morganatically and relinquished his Swedish titles in 1937. He was given the title Prince Bernadotte by his brother-in-law King Leopold III of Belgium. His male-line descendants would have borne the title Count Bernadotte, but in fact his only child is a daughter (Mrs. Madeleine Kogevinas, Countess Madeleine Bernadotte).

== Later title-holders ==
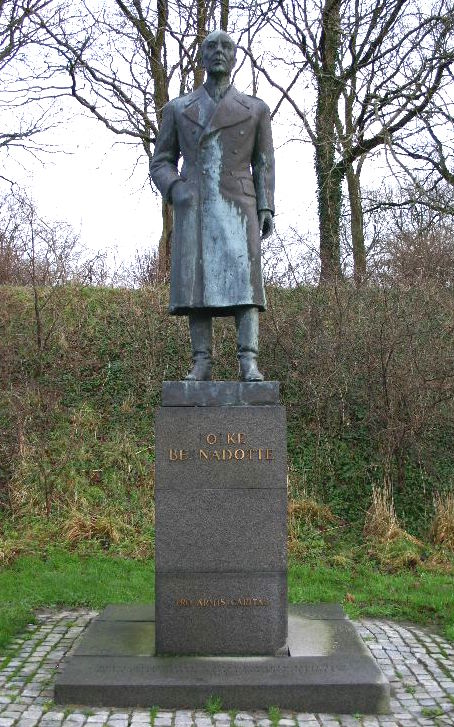
A monument to Folke Bernadotte in Denmark.

The agnatic (male-line) descendants of each of these four former princes of Sweden, after the first generation of children, are entitled to the title Count of Wisborg, but in practice, their surname is often included in the title, Count Bernadotte af Wisborg.

The most well-known is Folke Bernadotte, a son of Oscar Bernadotte, the first Count of Wisborg. He was the United Nations Security Council mediator in the Arab–Israeli conflict of 1947–1948, assassinated in 1948 by Zionist militants.

A number of members of these families were guests at the 2010 Wedding of Victoria, Crown Princess of Sweden, and Daniel Westling.

- Marianne Bernadotte, widow of Sigvard.
- Count Michael Bernadotte af Wisborg (son of Sigvard), his wife Countess Christine Bernadotte af Wisborg and their daughter Countess Kajsa Bernadotte af Wisborg.
- Carl Johan Bernadotte (above, son of King Gustaf VI Adolf) and his wife Gunnila Bernadotte.
- Countess Bettina Bernadotte af Wisborg (daughter of Lennart) and her husband Philipp Haug.
- Count Björn Bernadotte af Wisborg (son of Lennart) and his wife Countess Sandra Bernadotte af Wisborg.
- Count Bertil Bernadotte af Wisborg (son of Folke) and Countess Jill Bernadotte af Wisborg.

== See also ==
- Visborg
