= Marie Friberg =

Swedish opera singer

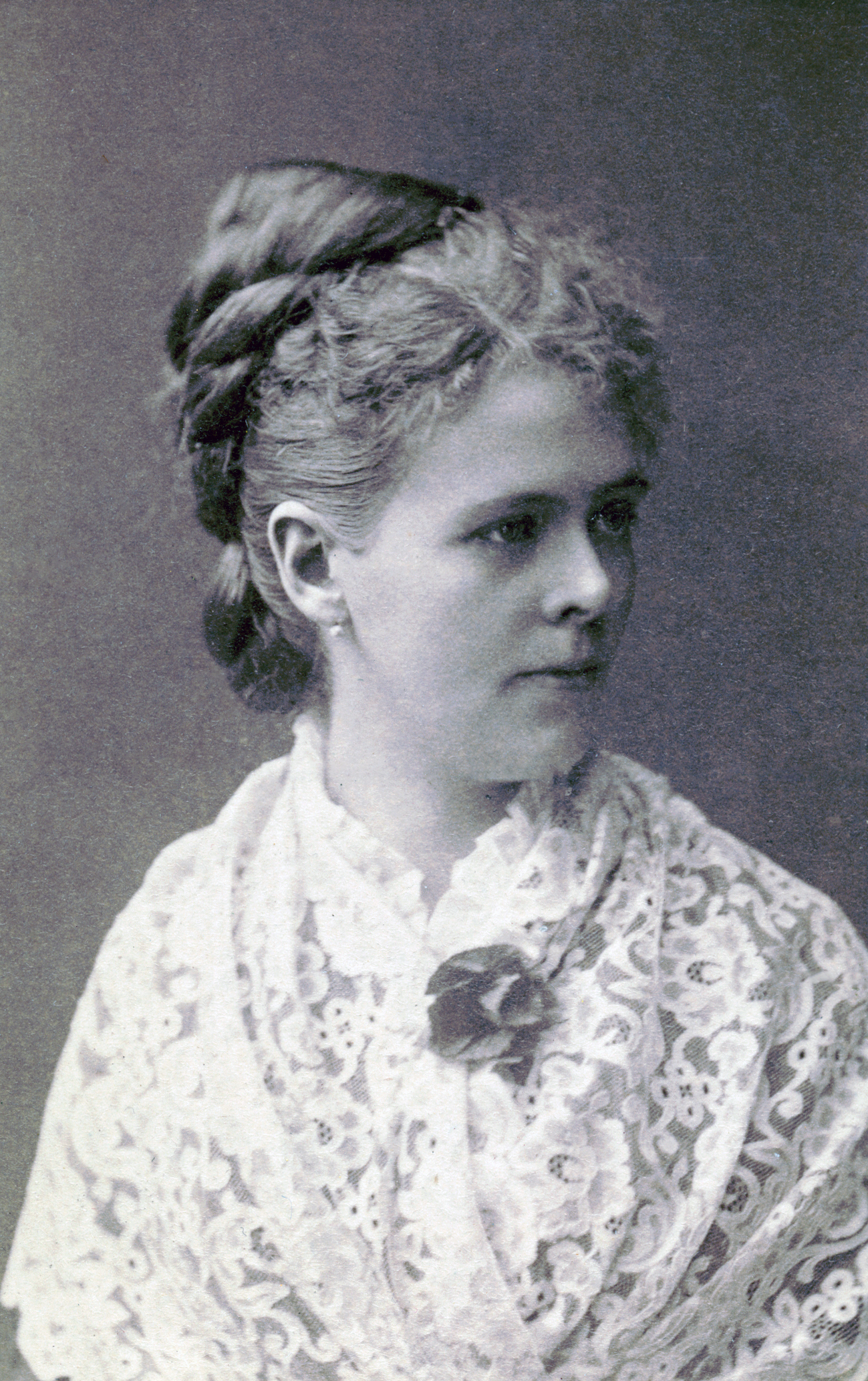
Marie Friberg

Marie (Maria) Friberg (5 January 1852 - 16 September 1934) was a Swedish opera singer (alto) of the Royal Swedish Opera. She is known for her relationship to King Oscar II of Sweden, with whom she allegedly had two sons.

== Biography ==
Maria Vilhelmina Friberg was born in the St. Nikolai parish of Stockholm, Sweden. In 1883, Friberg aroused attention in the press when she performed as the bride in "Lycko-Pers resa" by August Strindberg with the personal monogram of Oscar II in the bridal crown at Nya teatern in Stockholm. The paper Dagens Nyheter reported that Friberg was housed as the king's mistress with their two sons in a house owned by the monarch.

In 1891, she married the French noble Pascal d'Aubebard vicomte de Ferussac, who adopted her two sons. In 1893, she married Edvard Leman (1841–1922).

== Sources ==
- Elgklou, Lars (1978). Bernadotte: historien - och historier - om en familj. Stockholm: Askild & Kärnekull. Libris 7589807. ISBN 91-7008-882-9
- Lagerqvist, Lars O. (1979). Bernadotternas drottningar. Stockholm: Bonnier. Libris 7145664. ISBN 91-0-042916-3
