= Carl Fleetwood =

Swedish diplomat and author (1859–1892)

Baron Carl Fleetwood RNO
- Born: Carl Reinhold Axel Georgsson Fleetwood; 11 July 1859; Svea Life Guards Parish, Uppland, Sweden
- Died: 9 January 1892 (aged 32); Klara Parish, Uppland, Sweden
- Burial place: Husby-Rekarne Cemetery
- Spouse: Clara Sandströmer (m. 1886)
- Family: Fleetwood family

Carl Reinhold Axel Georgsson Fleetwood (11 July 1859 – 9 January 1892) was a Swedish diplomat and author.

== Biography ==
Carl Fleetwood was born on 11 July 1859 in Stockholm to Georg Vilhelm Fleetwood, Commander of Bohuslän Regiment and Cabinet Chamberlain, and Juliana Sofia Wilhelmina Rudbeck. In 1879, he entered Uppsala University after matriculating from Vänersborg the same year. According to himself, he strived escaping from his studies to enter working life. Following his civil service degree in law graduation in 1882, he became Notary Extraordinary of Svea Court of Appeal shortly thereafter.

He served the Ministry of Foreign Affairs as attaché to Copenhagen, Paris and London in 1883. He also held office as First and Second Secretary, as well as Chamberlain in the late 1880s and 1889 respectively. The latter of which, assisting as acting Secretary General between 1890 and 1891. In 1891, he was made Knight of the Order of the Polar Star and received several other foreign honours during his lifetime.

He married Clara Sandströmer, daughter of Carl Johan Albert Sandströmer and Clara Gustava Säve, in 1886. They had two children, named Georg Albert and Gwendolen. He was also a diligent author, writing letters and personal diaries. He also published texts on contemporary subjects, including Notes From My Time In Copenhagen, 18 June–31 July 1887. Some parts of his diary has been published. On 9 January 1892 aged 32 years old, he died of pneumonia and was buried in Husby-Rekarne Cemetery.
