= List of strikes in Sweden =

Throughout the history of Sweden, a number of strikes, labour disputes, student strikes, hunger strikes, and other industrial actions have occurred.

== Background ==
A labour strike is a work stoppage caused by the mass refusal of employees to work. This can include wildcat strikes, which are done without union authorisation, and slowdown strikes, where workers reduce their productivity while still carrying out minimal working duties. It is usually a response to employee grievances, such as low pay or poor working conditions. Strikes can also occur to demonstrate solidarity with workers in other workplaces or pressure governments to change policies.

== 20th century ==
=== 1900s ===
- Vinbräcka strike
- 1909 Swedish general strike

=== 1930s ===
- Ådalen shootings
- 1936–1937 Gothenburg rent strike

=== 1970s ===
- 1975 Swedish forestry workers' strike
- 1979 Sweden dentists' strike

=== 1980s ===
- Storkonflikten 1980
- 1985 Swedish public sector strike

=== 1990s ===
- 1998 Swedish painters' strike, organised by the Swedish Painters' Union.

== 21st century ==
=== 2010s ===
- 2019 Sweden women's national ice hockey team strike

=== 2020s ===
- 2022 Scandinavian Airlines strike;
- 2023 Stockholm train strike;
- 2023 Tesla Sweden strike
- 2024 Swedish healthcare strike, strike by healthcare workers in Sweden demanding higher wages and better scheduling, the first in 16 years, organised by the Swedish Association of Health Professionals.
