= Storkonflikten 1980 =

1980 labour dispute in Sweden

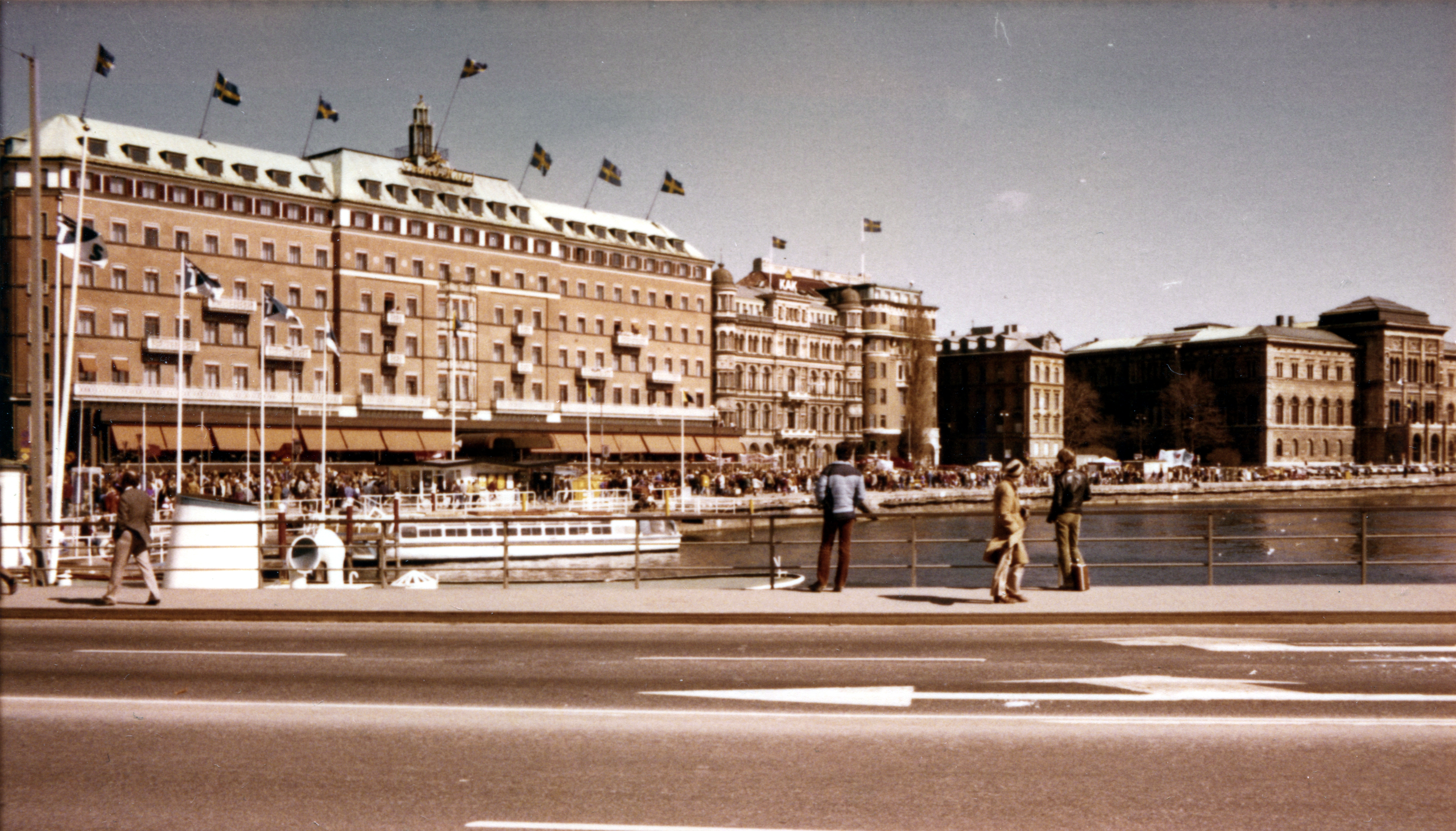
- International Workers' Day demonstration in Stockholm, 1 May 1980
- Date: 25 April 1980 – 12 May 1980
- Location: Sweden
- Methods: Strike action

Parties
Swedish Trade Union Confederation	Swedish Employers' Confederation

Storkonflikten 1980 (The Great Conflict of 1980) was a major labour dispute in Sweden in 1980. Lasting from 25 April to 12 May and involving almost a million workers, it was the largest labour dispute in Sweden since the 1909 Swedish general strike.

== Background ==
The Swedish Trade Union Confederation (Swedish: Landsorganisationen i Sverige; LO) is a major trade union umbrella organisation in Sweden, gathering together a significant number of the largest unions in the country. The Swedish Employers' Confederation (Swedish: Svenska Arbetsgivareföreningen, SAF) was a major employers' organization in Sweden. The Saltsjöbaden Agreement is a longstanding agreement between the LO and the SAF signed in the 1930s that set the standards for Swedish labour relations, particularly that the government should not interfere in collective bargaining negotiations.

== History ==
=== Prelude ===
Following the general election in September 1979, the right-wing parties in Sweden formed a government under Prime Minister Thorbjörn Fälldin, one of the few right-wing governments in Sweden since the 1930s. The new government announced a series of measures to tackle an economic crisis undergoing in Sweden, including significant tax reforms. The tax reforms proved controversial among Swedish workers, with the LO arguing that the burden of the reforms fell principally on workers instead of the wealthy. Gunnar Nilsson, chair of the LO, argued that "trade unionists alone should not be expected to carry the total burden for Sweden's ailing economy." The SAF, on the other hand, argued that the economic crisis was being fueled by excessively high wages and an excessively large public sector.

On 27 February, the SAF made a formal proposition to the LO to extend the current, expiring collective bargaining agreement, despite the fact that it would result no pay rises for the workers. The LO rejected the proposal, instead proposing an agreement with wage increases of over 11% to match inflation.

=== Strikes and lockouts ===
On 25 April, 14 000 workers walked off the job, beginning the strike.

On 30 April, the Swedish Employers' Confederation announced that it would be locking out LO workers after the LO refused an offer of mediation. In response, the LO announced that all its unions would go on strike. As the month of May began, 100 000 workers were on strike and an additional 700 000 were locked out.

The Stockholm Metro was forced to close for the first time in its history. Hospitals stopped all surgeries but emergency ones. Sveriges Radio P1 and Sveriges Radio P2 stopped broadcasting entirely during the strike, while Sveriges Television only broadcast news. A committee investigation the disappearance of Raoul Wallenberg was also forced to postpone its meetings during the conflict.

On 5 May, the SAF announced that it intended to extend its lockout until at least 18 May. In response, the conflict spread to Swedish oil refineries, with three of the four in the country shutting down due to strikes.

On 10 May, the Swedish Transport Workers' Union announced that its workers would stop transporting oil, with the union's leader saying that they would "close Sweden."

=== Resolution ===
On 12 May, following a discussion with the Prime Minister, the SAF announced that they would be accepting the LO's latest offer, stating that they still objected to the terms but acceptance was in the national interest.

== Impact ==
The strike caused significant discussions in Sweden over the future of the Swedish labour relations model and the Saltsjöbaden Agreement.

A 1985 study that examined the impact of surgeons in Stockholm withholding elective surgeries during the strike found no increase in mortality due to the strike.
