= Johan Ludvig Boye =

Swedish Politician and Royalist

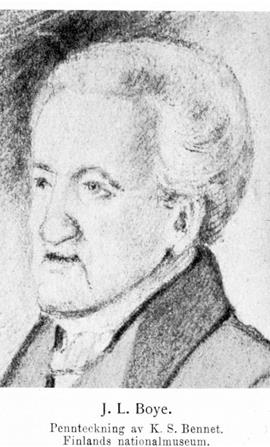

Member of the Riksdag of the Estates
- In office 1789; 1800; 1810 – 1841
- Monarchs: Gustav III; Gustav IV Adolf; Charles XIII; Charles XIV John

First Expedition Secretary Acting judge referee
- In office 24 October 1798 – 8 February 1802
- Monarchs: Gustav III; Gustav IV Adolf

Judge referee
- In office 8 February 1802 – 23 January 1836
- Monarchs: Gustav III; Gustav IV Adolf; Charles XIII; Charles XIV John

Personal details
- Born: 24 May 1768
- Died: 20 October 1841 (aged 73)
- Relatives: Gustaf Reinhold Boije (cousin)
- Awards: Commander of the Order of Vasa

Johan Ludvig Boye, formally spelt Boije (Swedish: Johan Ludvig Johansson Boije af Gennäs; 24 May 1768 – 20 October 1841), was a Swedish baron, jurist, and a member of the Riksdag of the Estates, as well as a well-known antisemite.

== Biography ==
Boye was born on 24 May, 1768 in Östergötland County as the son of baron Johan Gustaf Boije.

In 1785, Boye became an apprentice at the Göta Court of Appeal, then later in 1798, he became First Expedition Secretary (the Deputy State Secretary), and in 1802 he became the judge referee. During the Riksdag of 1789, he was a firm member of the Royalist faction that were in support of the royal dictatorship set in place by king Gustav III and his bloodless revoloution.

At the Riksdag of 1815, Boye, a firm antisemite, stood behind the proposition of a bill that would restrict the rights of the Jews. He, together with the burgher member of the Riksdag, herr Stabeck, proposed that the Jews who did not want to be part of a new regulation should be banished from the realm and that a third of their property should be confiscated by the state.

Boye then appeared at the Riksdags as one of the government's most loyal and vocal supporters. His wit in debate and his resourcefulness in reply made him quite the noted personality in the Royalist and Conservative ranks. Among other things, he strongly opposed the law committee's reform-friendly proposals and was appointed by the government after the Riksdag of 1834–35 to the so-called "tableau committee", that were to review the new bill in comparison to the laws already in place.

When King Charles XIV John – against the unanimous disapproval of the State Council - in 1841 appointed him to the Law Preparation Board (Swedish: Lagberedningen) requested by the Riksdag, at first the members of the old law committee (Richert and Staaff) refused to be part of it, as well as all those they appointed at the same time as him, and it proved impossible to get the Law Preparation Board in full until he died, on 20 October, 1841, in Jönköping County.
