= Gustaf Boije =

Personal details
- Born: 18 March 1769
- Died: 16 February 1836 (aged 66)
- Relatives: Johan Ludvig Boye (cousin)

Military service
- Years of service: 1786–1802; 1803–1825
- Rank: Major General
- Battles/wars: Russo-Swedish War; Battle of Uttismalm; Battle of Kaipiais; Battle of Valkeala; Battle of Keltis; Franco-Swedish War; Siege of Stralsund (1807); Finnish War; Helsinki village landing; Battle of Sävar; Napoleonic Wars; German Campaign; Battle of Großbeeren; Battle of Dennewitz; Battle of Leipzig (1813); Swedish-Norwegian War; Battle of Tistedalen
- Awards: Commander Grand Cross of the Order of the Sword; Knight Grand Cross of the Order of the Sword

Gustaf Reinhold Boije af Gennäs, (18 March 1769 – 16 February 1836), was a Swedish baron and officer.

Boije distinguished himself for his great bravery during the Russo-Swedish War, but resigned due to an agreement dispute in 1802. In 1805, he entered Swedish military service again, and fought in the Franco-Swedish War. He then became colonel and chief adjutant to the king and on the outbreak of war executed the notorious arrest of the Russian minister Frans David Alopaeus. Boije was in command during the attempted landing of the Guards Regiments at Helsinge. He also participated in the following wars and was promoted to lieutenant general.

Boije, who always had bad business, ran away from the country in 1825, left behind large debts and died as a poor man in the Grand Duchy of Finland.

== Biography ==
Boije, was born on March 18, 1769, in Vaasa, as the son of captain Erik Ernst Boije and Hedvig Ulrika von Köhler.

Already as a young officer, Boije had the opportunity to prove his bravery in battle, when he participated as an ensign in the Östgöta infantry regiment in Russo-Swedish War in the years 1788−1790. Among the battles he fought in were the Battle of Kaipiais in 1789 and the Battle of Valkeala in 1790. During the Battle of Valkeala, Boije was wounded and, for his bravery, rewarded with an appointment to captain in the army, a promotion, which was soon followed by further advancement. But as early as 1802, as a major, he sought dismissal from the army.

During the time after the dismissal, Boije stayed abroad, and on his return in 1803 was appointed chief adjutant to the king with duty at the Pomeranian Division. When king Gustav IV Adolf, after the outbreak of the Franco-Swedish War in November 1805, happened to be in Stralsund, a general staff was organized for the combined army, in which Boije was appointed as adjutant general of the wing. In the following year, Boije received a position as the king's duty adjutant at headquarters. When the king returned to Sweden in September 1806, the general staff was disbanded, but Boije had already been placed in the military department of the governor-general's office in Pomerania a few months earlier, and on the king's return to Pomerania in May 1807, he was given a place again in the then newly organized general staff . He later took part in the siege of Stralsund and participated in its defence. After being noted for having performed with special distinction, he was promoted to colonel in the army.

In March 1808, serving as Gustav IV Adolf's personal chief adjutant, Boije received the task of arresting, in revenge for the Russians' attack without a declaration of war in Finland, the Russian minister Alopaeus on the king's orders. Boije with an escort of soldiers would place Alopaeus, his wife and the entire legation staff under arrest. But even after Alopaeus' arrest, he was still able to continue sending dispatches to Russia containing information of significant value for the Russian warfare against Sweden. It is now known that Boije acted treacherously against Sweden when he let Alopaeus send these letters, something that is supported by the fact that in 1810 Boije was awarded the Russian Order of St. Anna in diamonds.

After the king's journey to Åland in June 1808, he was accompanied by Boije, who initially served at headquarters. When at the end of September the king launched the well-known landing attempts against southern Finland, General Adjutant Gustaf Olof Lagerbring had been given command of the force that would attempt a landing at Helsinki. However, Lagerbring declared that the attempt was impossible in view of the small strength of the Landing Corps, whereupon the king dismissed him from his command, which was instead assigned to Boije. He thus came unprepared to become the leader of the failed landing attempt, which ended with the rank regiments of the Guard being demoted even though its retreat was carried out under valiant combat. Boije wrote an explanation of the operations undertaken but failed to persuade the king and then did not refrain from countersigning the general order which led to the humiliation of the guards. Boije was blamed for the failure of the operation, yet enjoyed all the still gracious trust of the king, as commander of the third Åland brigade under Georg Carl von Döbeln, participated in his operations on Åland. He then remained as a brigade commander in the coastal army and witnessed the campaign in Västerbotten: during the same he participated, among other things, in the battle of Sävar. The new owners of power also seem to have given him their favor, as he was appointed adjutant-general to Charles XIII and regimental commander, and partly received the powerful task of carrying out the regulation of the new national border with Russian delegates.

During the campaign in Germany (1813−1814), Boije took part, and at the beginning of the campaign was given the rank of major general. He initially commanded the 6th Brigade under von Döbeln. It was Boije who had to lead the campaign towards Hamburg, which von Döbeln recommended against Crown Prince Charles John's intentions and which caused the well-known court-martial sentence on the general von Döbeln. During this time he was also used in ministerial assignments for negotiations with a Danish envoy. During the continuation of the war, Boije led a so-called "free corps" and witnessed the battles of Grossbeeren, Dennewitz and Leipzig; when Swedish arms were turned against Denmark, he was detached with his division, which included not only Swedish but also Russian, Prussian and Hanoverian troops, to besiege the Glückstadt fortress and succeeded in taking it in January 1814. As a reward for this feat, Boije was made a lieutenant general by Charles John. After the Treaty of Kiel, Boije marched off as head of the Swedes' vanguard towards the French border and later led divisional command at Brussels. Even after the main part of the Swedish army had marched home, Boije remained with his division in the Low Lands on a special mission and finally began the home march via Rostock, when he transferred to Gothenburg and entered Norway. Here he fought the Battle of Trøgstad. As the Swedish representative in the negotiations with Prussia regarding Pomerania's cession, Boije then had the painful task of releasing the Pomeranian subjects (the 33rd (East Prussian) Fusiliers "Count Roon" and the 34th (Pomeranian) Fusiliers) from their oath of allegiance to the Swedish crown and seems to have represented Sweden in a dignified way.

After returning from Pomerania, Boije devoted himself to his regiment and, after promotion to inspector general, went on inspection tours, initially in the third, later in the first infantry inspection. However, his successful trajectory was soon to be spectacularly interrupted. His economy was in fact completely undermined. After he remarried, he seems to have had help from his father-in-law, but he could not continue with this in the long run; Charles John probably also stepped in to help, but had not been able to stop his approaching ruin, and in 1825 Boije, after procuring travel funds on probably rather fraudulent grounds, fled to Hamburg, leaving behind large debts. Shortly afterwards, his father-in-law went bankrupt, after which the family left behind by Boije also fell into misery. He himself, who finally moved to Finland, lived out his remaining years dependent on the goodwill of relatives and in poor conditions. He died on February 16, 1836, at Haga in Finland, a very poor and indebted man.
