= Victoria of Sweden (disambiguation) =

Victoria of Sweden - Swedish also: Viktoria - may refer to:

- Victoria of Baden (legal spelling after 1900: Viktoria), Queen consort of Sweden 1907–1930
- Victoria, Crown Princess of Sweden, born in 1977, heir apparent to the Swedish throne since 1980
