= Order of the Norwegian Lion =

Abolished Norwegian order of chivalry

Order of the Norwegian Lion Den norske løve
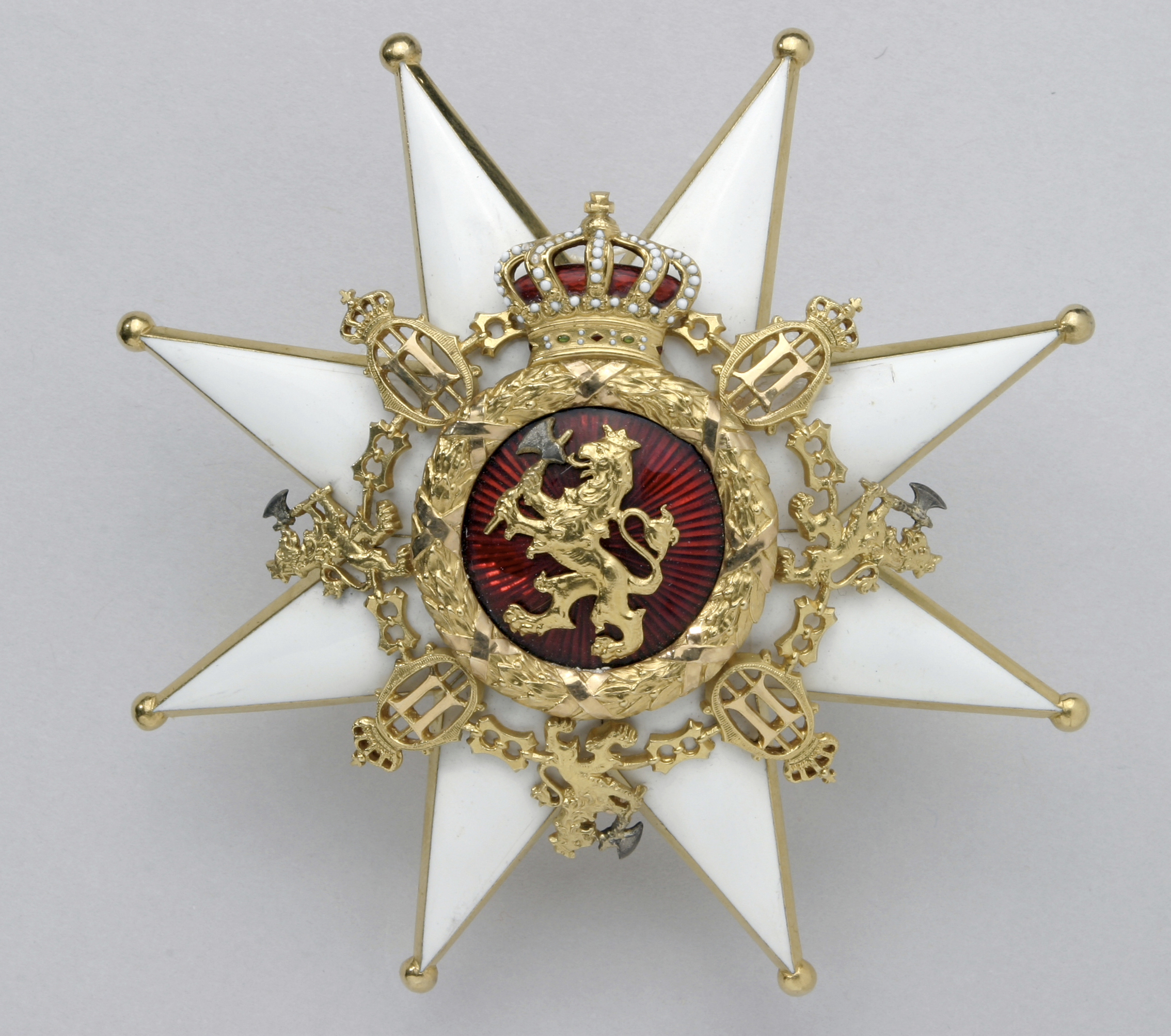
- Star of the Order of the Norwegian Lion
- Type: Single grade Order of knighthood
- Country: Norway
- Ribbon
- Status: repealed by Court resolution 11 March 1952

Statistics
- Last induction: 10 September 1904
- Total inductees: 11

Precedence
- Next (higher): none
- Next (lower): Order of St. Olav
- Related: Order of the Seraphim
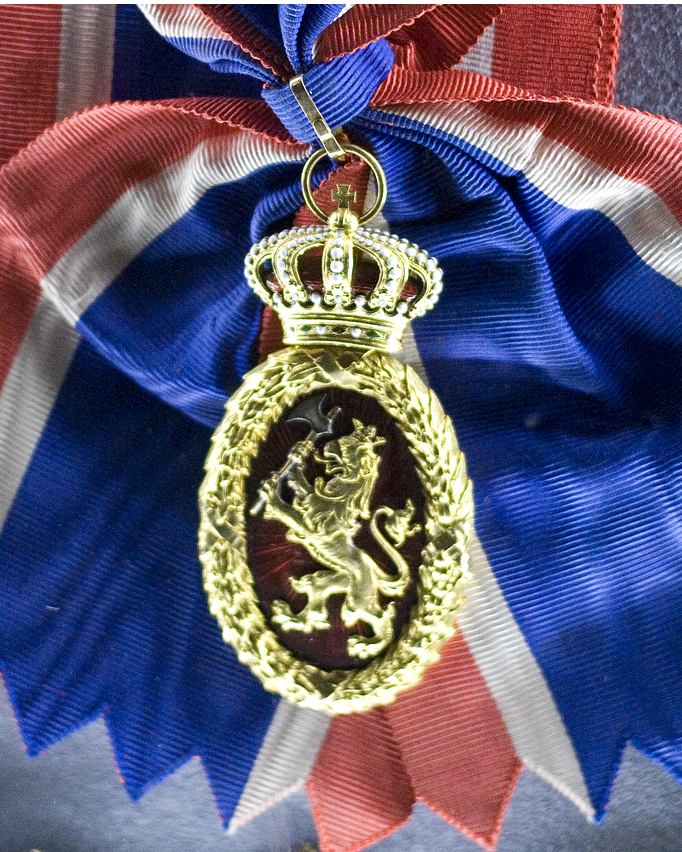
- Badge of the order

The Order of the Norwegian Lion was a Norwegian order of knighthood established by King Oscar II on 21 January 1904, "in memory of the glorious events associated with Norway’s venerable Coat of Arms".

The order was established as an equivalent in rank to the Swedish Order of the Seraphim as knights of the Norwegian Order of St. Olav ranked below the knights of the Seraphim in the shared Swedish-Norwegian royal court. However the expansion of the Norwegian honours system received mixed reactions amongst Norwegian politicians.

The Union between Sweden and Norway was dissolved in 1905 before any Norwegian knights had been appointed and King Haakon VII chose not to appoint any new knights. He formally repealed the order in a Court resolution on 11 March 1952. The last living knight was King Gustaf VI Adolf of Sweden, who died in 1973.

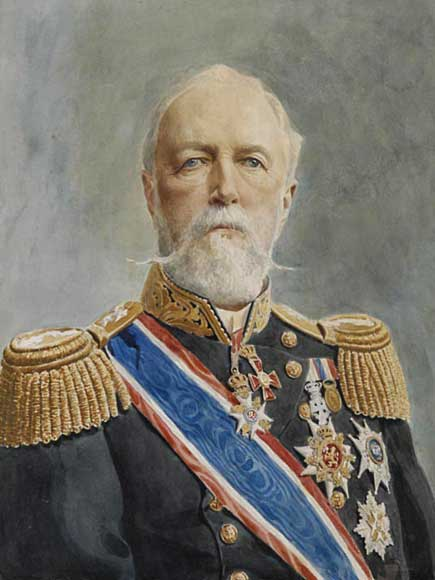
King Oscar II with the sash and star of the order

== Complete list of knights ==
No	Name	Known for	Year Appointed
1	(Union between Sweden and Norway) King Oscar II	Royal Family	21 January 1904
2	(Union between Sweden and Norway) Crown Prince Gustaf, Duke of Värmland	Royal Family	21 January 1904
3	(Union between Sweden and Norway) Prince Gustaf Adolf, Duke of Skåne	Royal Family	21 January 1904
4	(Union between Sweden and Norway) Prince Wilhelm, Duke of Södermanland	Royal Family	21 January 1904
5	(Union between Sweden and Norway) Prince Erik, Duke of Västmanland	Royal Family	21 January 1904
6	(Union between Sweden and Norway) Prince Carl, Duke of Västergötland	Royal Family	21 January 1904
7	(Union between Sweden and Norway) Prince Eugen, Duke of Närke	Royal Family	21 January 1904

Honorary Knights

No	Name	Known for	Year Appointed
1	(German Empire) Wilhelm II	German Emperor and King of Prussia	27 January 1904
2	(Austria-Hungary) Franz Joseph I	Emperor of Austria and King of Hungary	5 April 1904
3	(Denmark) Christian IX	King of Denmark	10 September 1904
4	(French Third Republic) Émile Loubet	President of France	1 December 1904

King Haakon VII formally became Grand Master on 18 November 1905, but never wore any of the order's insignia.
