= Victoria of Baden =

Former Queen consort of Sweden from 1907 to 1930

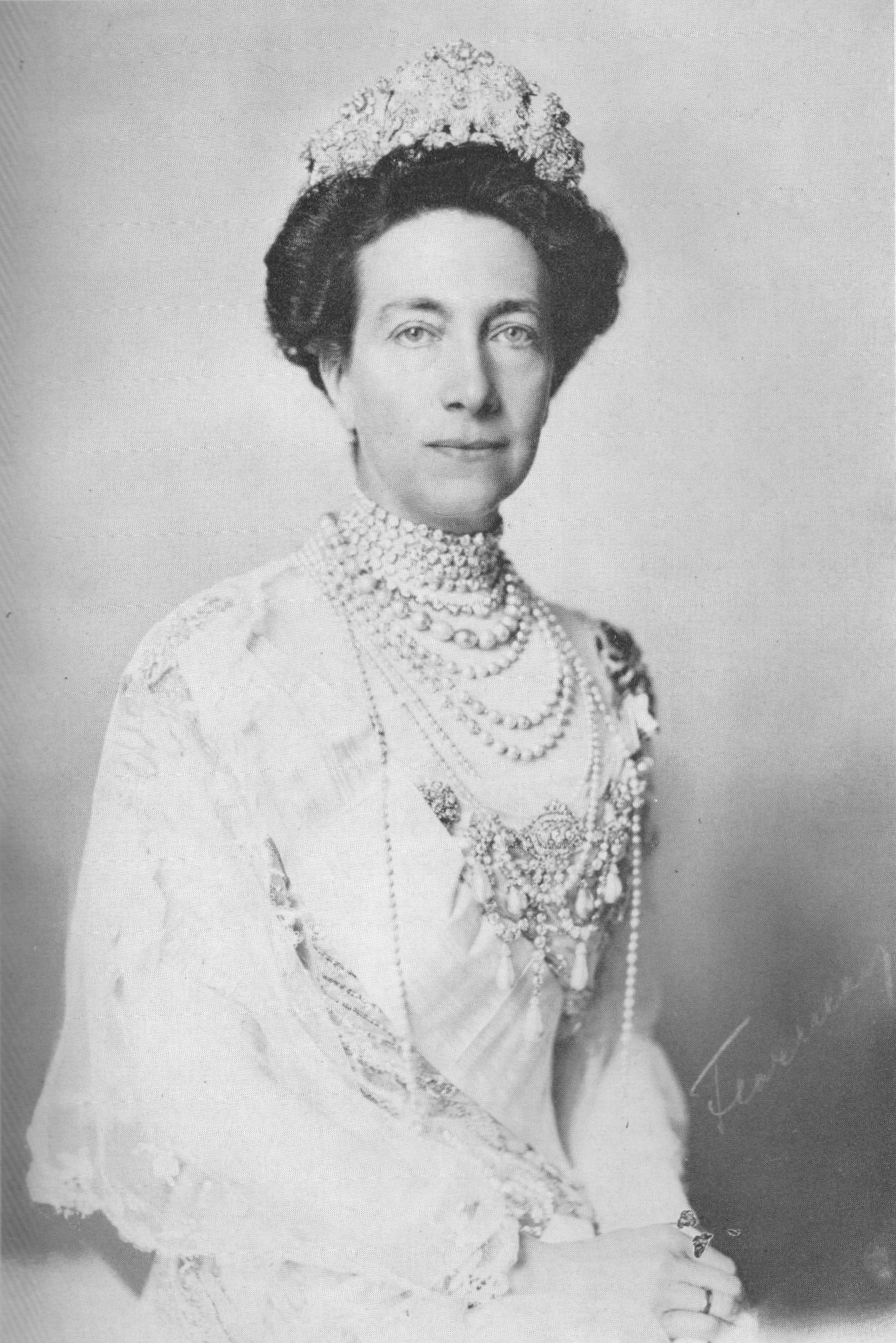
- Queen Victoria in 1910

Queen consort of Sweden
- Tenure: 8 December 1907 – 4 April 1930
- Born: 7 August 1862; Karlsruhe, Grand Duchy of Baden, German Confederation
- Died: 4 April 1930 (aged 67); Rome, Kingdom of Italy
- Burial: 12 April 1930; Riddarholmen Church
- Spouse: Gustaf V of Sweden (m. 1881)
- Issue: Gustaf VI Adolf; Prince Wilhelm, Duke of Södermanland; Prince Erik, Duke of Västmanland
Names
- Sophie Marie Viktoria
- House: Zähringen
- Father: Frederick I, Grand Duke of Baden
- Mother: Princess Louise of Prussia

Victoria of Baden (German: Sophie Marie Viktoria; 7 August 1862 – 4 April 1930) was Queen of Sweden from 8 December 1907 until her death in 1930 as the wife of King Gustaf V. She was politically active in a conservative fashion during the development of democracy and known to be pro-German during the First World War.

== Early life ==
Princess Victoria was born on 7 August 1862 at Karlsruhe Palace, Baden. Her parents were Grand Duke Frederick I of Baden, and Princess Louise of Prussia. Victoria was named after her aunt by marriage, Crown Princess Victoria of Prussia, daughter of Queen Victoria of the United Kingdom, thus she was also a paternal first cousin of Wilhelm II, the last German Emperor and King of Prussia.

Victoria was tutored privately in the Karlsruhe Palace, by governesses and private teachers, in an informal "Palace School" with carefully selected girls from the aristocracy. She was given a conventional education for her gender and class with focus on art, music and languages, and could play the piano, paint and speak French and English. Victoria was given a strict and Spartan upbringing with a focus on duty. Among other things, her mother ordered her to sleep on hard mattresses by an open window. Such spartan methods were recommended at the time as beneficial and something that would harden the child's future health, but it is believed that this in fact had negative consequences for Victoria's health later in life.

Victoria was confirmed in 1878. After this, she made her debut in adult social life and her marriage prospects were discussed.

== Crown Princess ==
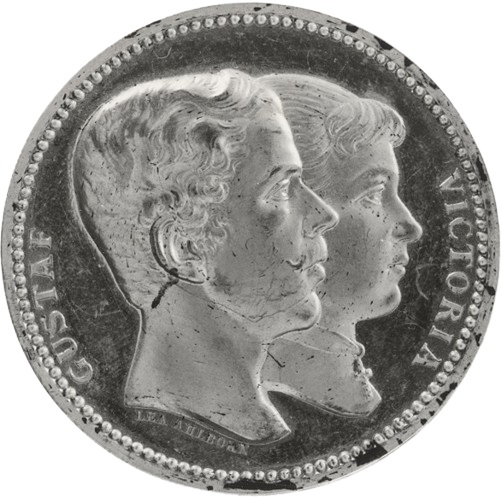
Wedding medal for Victoria and Gustaf in 1881

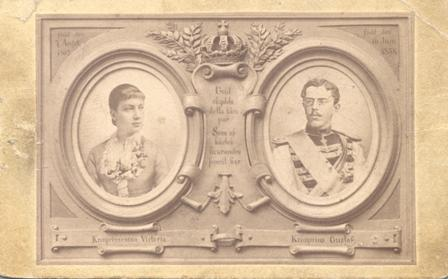
Victoria and Gustaf of Sweden

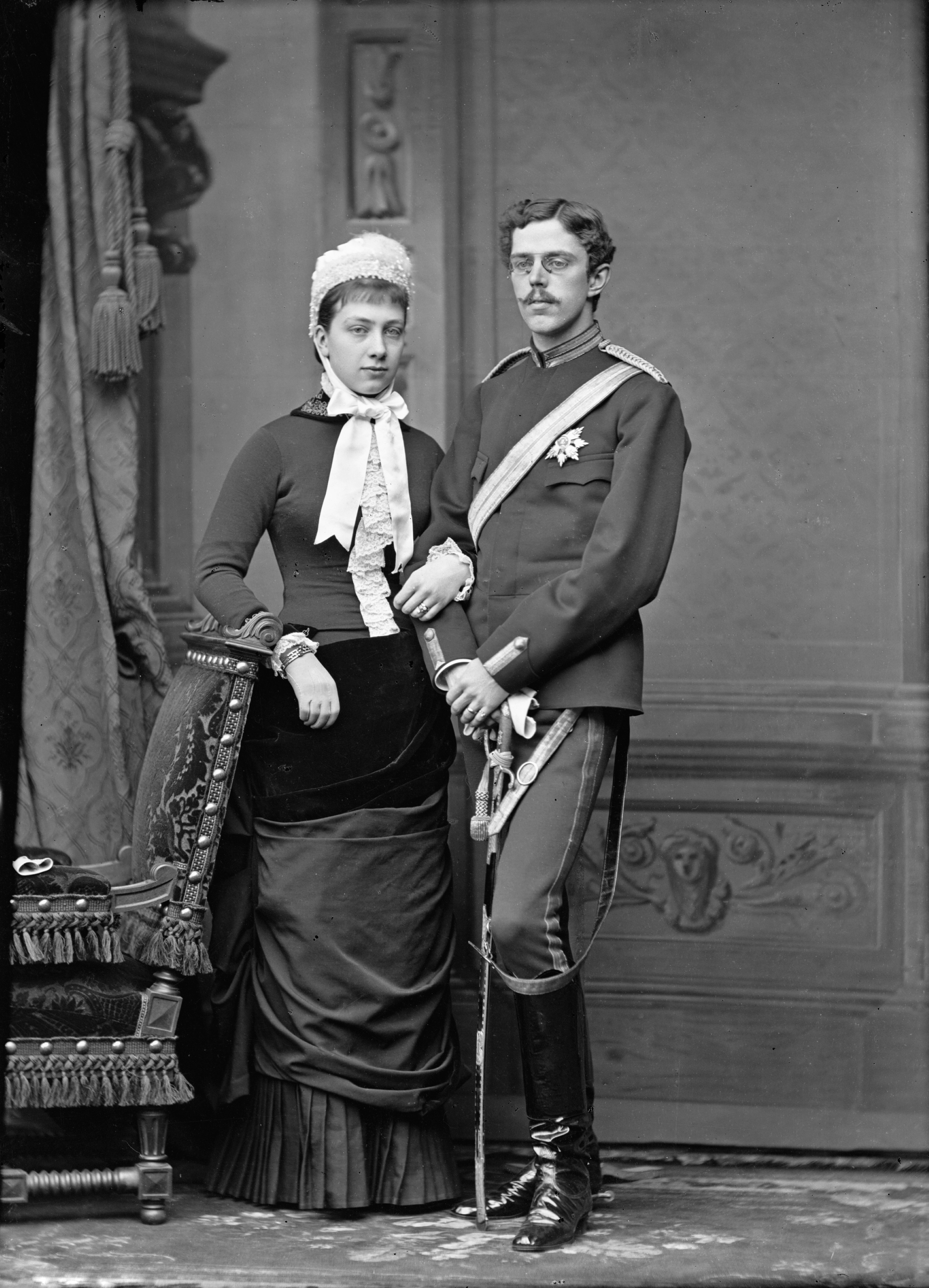
Crown Princess Victoria and Crown Prince Gustaf of Sweden, 1880s

On 20 September 1881 in Karlsruhe Princess Victoria married Crown Prince Gustaf of Sweden and Norway, the son of King Oscar II of Sweden and Norway and Sofia of Nassau. The German emperor and empress were present at the wedding, and marriage was arranged as a sign that Sweden belonged to the German sphere of influence in Europe. The marriage was popular in Sweden, where she was called "The Vasa Princess" because of her descent from the old Vasa dynasty, In addition, she was a great-granddaughter of King Gustav IV Adolf. She received a very elaborate welcome on the official cortege into Stockholm 1 October 1881. On 1 February 1882, Victoria and Gustaf visited Oslo, where they were welcomed with a procession of 3,000 torch bearers.

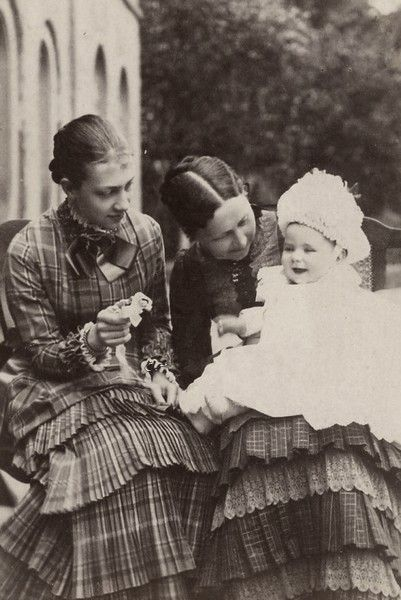
Victoria, Crown Princess of Sweden with her mother, Grand Duchess Louise of Baden (only daughter of Wilhelm I, German Emperor) and her eldest son, baby Gustaf Adolf, 1883.

She and Gustaf were brought together by their families and their marriage was reported not to have been a happy one. Their marriage produced three children. In 1890–1891, Victoria and Gustaf travelled to Egypt in an attempt to repair their relationship, but it did not succeed, allegedly due to Victoria's interest in one of the courtiers, and she repeated the trip to Egypt in 1891–1892. After 1889, the personal relationship between Victoria and Gustaf is considered to have been finished, in part, as estimated by Lars Elgklou, due to Gustaf's bisexuality. She suffered from postnatal depression after the birth of her first child in 1882, and after this, she often spent the winters at spas abroad. She would continue to spend the winters outside Sweden from that year until her death. By 1888, her winter trips had made her unpopular, and she was described as very haughty. In 1889, she had pneumonia, and was formally ordered by her doctors to spend the cold Swedish winters in a southern climate. She had conflicts with her parents-in-law about her expensive stays abroad.

She greatly disapproved of the marriage between her brother-in-law Prince Oscar and her lady-in-waiting Ebba Munck af Fulkila in 1888. She is described as strong-willed and artistically talented. She was an accomplished amateur photographer and painter, and she also sculpted. On her travels in Egypt and Italy she both photographed and painted extensively, and experimented with various photo-developing techniques, producing high-quality photographic work. She was also an excellent pianist and, for example, could play through the complete Ring of the Nibelung by Wagner without notes. She had had a good music education, and in her youth she had turned the notes at court concerts for Franz Liszt. Her favourite composers were Schubert and Beethoven. She was also described as a skillful rider.

== Queen ==
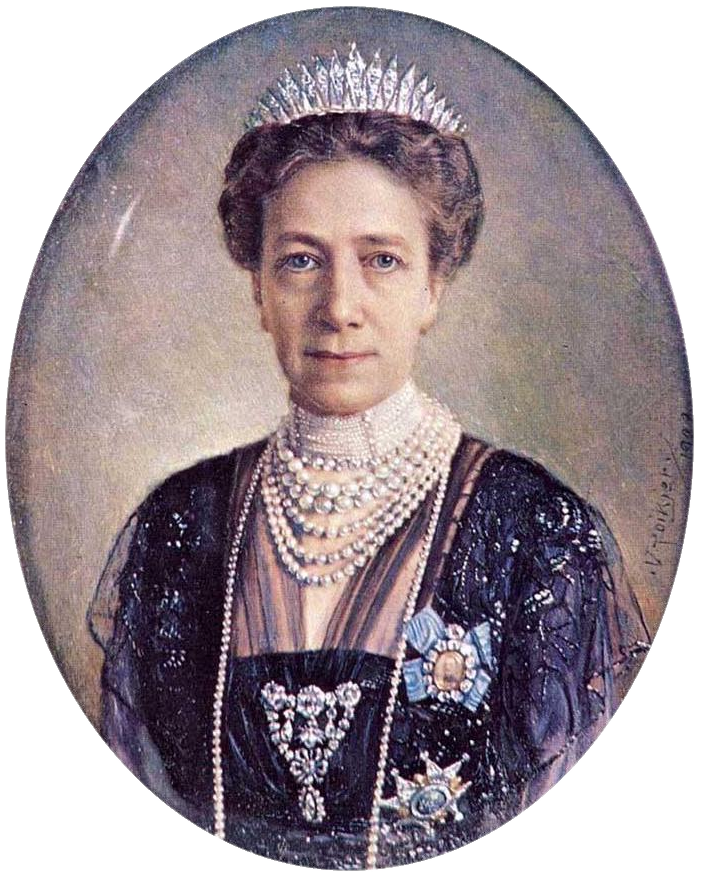
Queen Viktoria of Sweden.

Victoria became Queen-consort of Sweden with her father-in-law's death on 8 December 1907. As queen, she was present in Sweden only during the summers, but she still dominated the court. She arranged the marriage between her son Wilhelm and Grand Duchess Maria Pavlovna of Russia in 1908. She was also devoted to various kinds of charity, in Sweden, Germany and Italy.

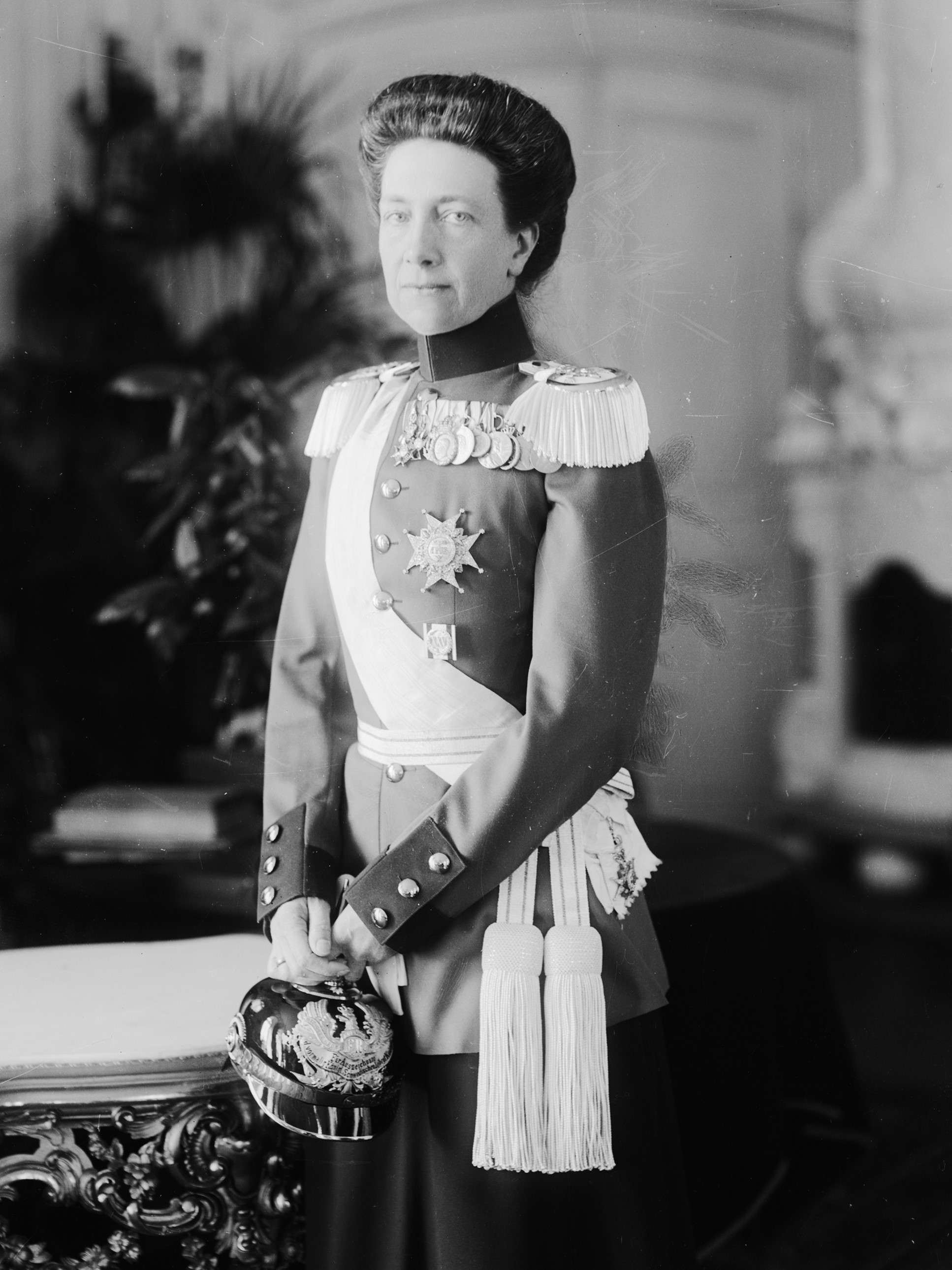
Queen Victoria in her uniform as Colonel-in-Chief of the 34th (Pomeranian) Fusiliers renamed in her honour.

Queen Victoria had substantial political influence over her husband, who was often considered pro-German. In 1908, Victoria made an official visit to Berlin with Gustaf, where she was made an honorary Prussian Colonel of the 34th (Pomeranian) Fusiliers by her cousin Wilhelm II. She was described as strict and militant, and it was said that she had the heart of a Prussian soldier. She was very strict with discipline, and if any member of the palace guard forgot to salute her, he was generally put under arrest. Swedish court life was also dominated by a certain stiffness, upheld by her favoured lady in waiting, Helene Taube. Victoria was deeply conservative in her views and resented the dissolution of the Swedish-Norwegian union in 1905, the Great Strike of 1909, and the 1911 election victory of the radicals and the Socialists as well as the liberals, and when her son was temporary regent in 1912, she warned him in letters from Italy that he should not be too "intimate" with the elected government.

Queen Victoria lost much popularity among Swedes for her often noted pro-German attitude, particularly politically during World War I when she is said to have influenced her husband to a large extent. During World War I, she gave a personal gift to every Swedish volunteer to the German forces. She kept up a close contact with her first cousin, German Emperor Wilhelm II, whom she often visited during the war She founded "Drottningens centralkomittée" ("The Queen's Central Committee") for defence equipment. She deeply resented the social democratic election victories in 1917 and worked to prevent them from taking part in the government. Victoria's political influence was founded upon the power position of her first cousin, the German Emperor and King of Prussia, and in 1918–19, after he was deposed, she lost all political influence in Sweden.

Queen Victoria suffered from very poor health (much of it due to poor treatment by several doctors in her youth), and often went on trips to try to improve it (she suffered from bronchitis and possibly tuberculosis). She was treated with mercury and unduly heavy medications during her difficult pregnancies, possibly the cause of her chronic conditions. From 1892 to her death, Axel Munthe was her personal physician, and recommended for health reasons that she spend winters on the Italian island of Capri. While initially hesitant, in the autumn of 1901 she travelled to Capri, arriving to an official welcome and a crowd that escorted her from the Marina Grand to the Hotel Paradise. From then on, except during World War I and for the last two years of her life, she spent several months a year on Capri. After some time, she decided to purchase her own residence on Capri, an intimate rustic two-storey farmhouse she named Casa Caprile, which she had extensively landscaped, surrounding it with a dense park. In the 1950s, twenty years after her death, the property became a hotel.

The Queen went to Munthe's residence, the Villa San Michele, most mornings to join Munthe for walks around the island. Munthe and the Queen also arranged evening concerts at San Michele, at which the Queen played the piano. They also shared a love of animals, with the Queen frequently being seen with a leashed dog, and she was known to support Munthe's (eventually successful) efforts to purchase Mount Barbarossa for use as a bird sanctuary. It was rumoured that Munthe and the Queen were lovers, but this has never been confirmed.

Queen Victoria spent a lot of her time abroad for health reasons, as the Swedish climate was not considered good for her, and during her last years as queen, she was seldom present in Sweden: she participated in an official visit to Norrland in 1921, a visit to Dalarna in 1924, and to Finland in 1925. The visit to Finland was her last official appearance as queen; although she did visit Sweden for her husband's birthday in 1928, she did not show herself to the public. During those celebrations, however, someone noticed the figure of a woman behind a curtain in the Royal Palace of Stockholm: he waved to her, and she waved back with her handkerchief. After this, she left Sweden for Italy for good: she died two years afterwards.

== Death ==
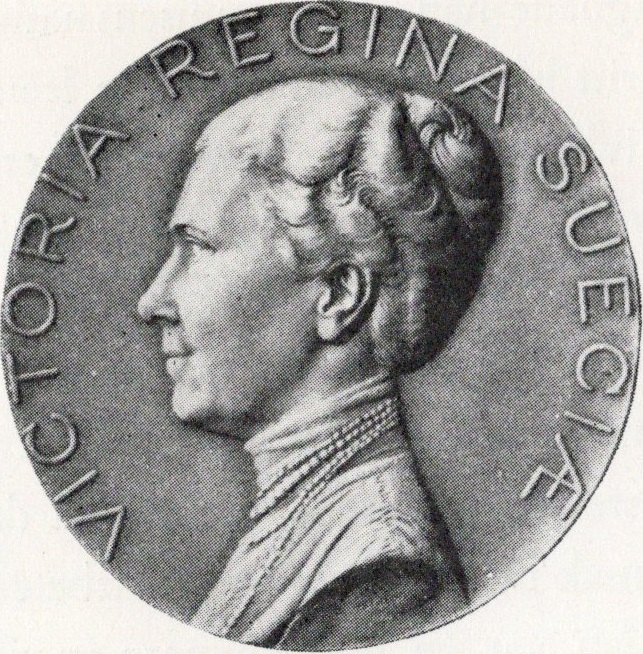
Medal for Queen Victoria in 1930

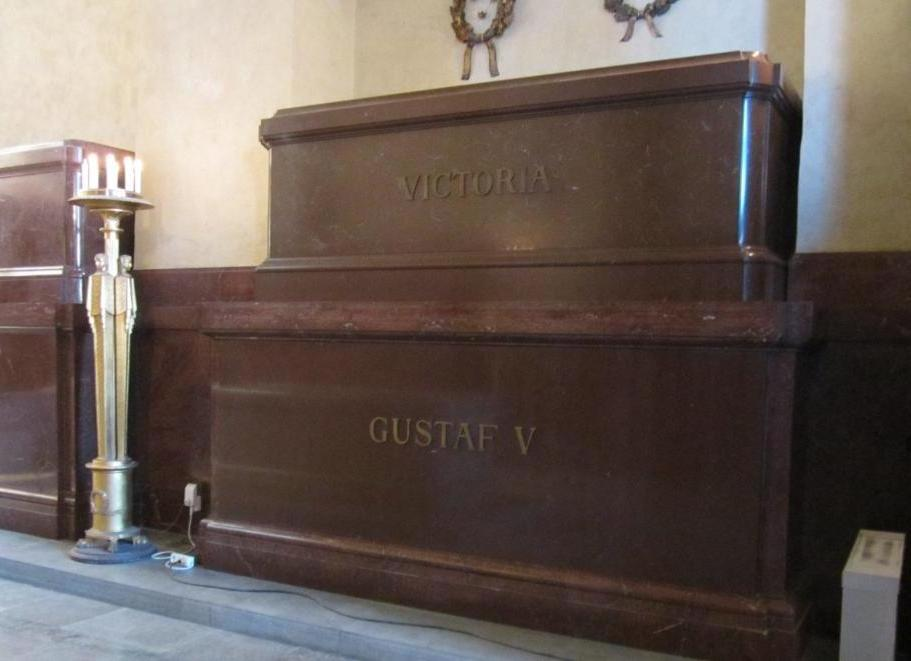
The sarcophagi of King Gustaf V and Queen Viktoria inside Riddarholmen Church.

Toward the end of her life, with her health declining, Munthe recommended she no longer spend time in Capri, and she returned to Sweden for some time, building a Capri-styled villa there. She then moved to Rome.

Her final visit to Sweden was on her husband's 70th birthday in June 1928, and Queen Victoria died on 4 April 1930 in her home Villa Svezia in Rome aged 67.

== Issue ==
Name	Birth	Death	Notes
King Gustaf VI Adolf of Sweden	11 November 1882	15 September 1973 (aged 90)	married 1) Princess Margaret of Connaught (1882–1920), had issue (including Ingrid, Queen of Denmark); married 2) Louise Mountbatten (1889–1965), a stillborn daughter
Prince Wilhelm, Duke of Södermanland	17 June 1884	5 June 1965 (aged 80)	married Grand Duchess Maria Pavlovna of Russia (1890–1958), had issue
Prince Erik, Duke of Västmanland	20 April 1889	20 September 1918 (aged 29)	died of the Spanish flu, unmarried and without issue

== Arms ==
Marital arms of Crown Prince Gustaf and Crown Princess Victoria	Victoria's coat of arms as queen of Sweden	Royal Monogram of Queen Victoria of Sweden

== Ancestry ==
Ancestors of Victoria of Baden

8. Charles Frederick, Grand Duke of Baden
4. Leopold, Grand Duke of Baden
9. Baroness Louise Caroline Geyer of Geyersberg
2. Frederick I, Grand Duke of Baden
10. Gustav IV Adolf, King of Sweden
5. Princess Sophie of Sweden
11. Princess Frederica of Baden
1. Princess Victoria of Baden
12. Frederick William III, King of Prussia
6. Wilhelm I, German Emperor
13. Duchess Louise of Mecklenburg-Strelitz
3. Princess Louise of Prussia
14. Charles Frederick, Grand Duke of Saxe-Weimar-Eisenach
7. Princess Augusta of Saxe-Weimar-Eisenach
15. Grand Duchess Maria Pavlovna of Russia

== Photographic work ==
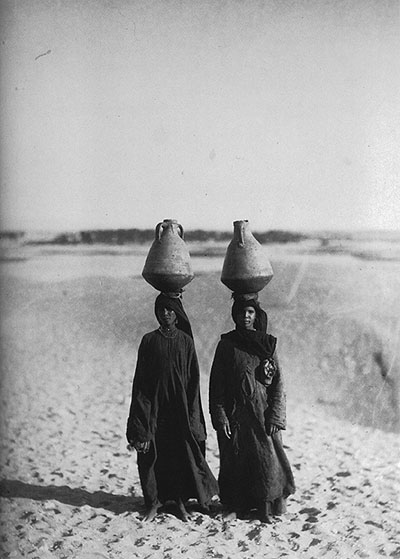
"Before we reached the camp we came across a long string of beduin women in their long blue dresses." Photo: Queen Victoria of Sweden. Egypt, 1890.

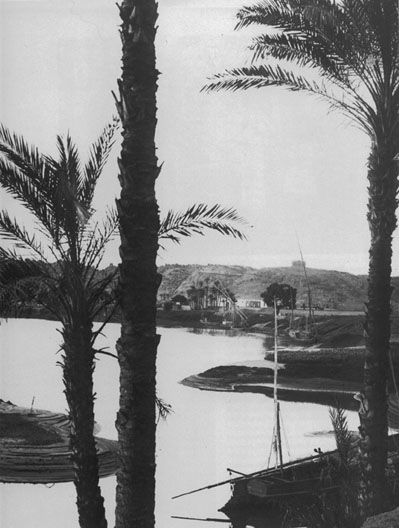
"The river Nile at Shellal, photograph taken in the late afternoon on the 15th of February 1891." Photo: Queen Victoria of Sweden. Egypt, 1891

Victoria of Baden House of Zähringen Born: 7 August 1862 Died: 4 April 1930
Swedish royalty
Preceded by Sophia of Nassau	Queen consort of Sweden; 1907–1930	Vacant Title next held by Louise Mountbatten
