= Lilla Saltsjöbadsavtalet =

Far-right conspiracy theory

Lilla Saltsjöbadsavtalet ("The Little Saltsjöbaden Agreement") is a conspiracy theory within the far-right community about an alleged meeting which is claimed to have occurred at Saltsjöbaden on 21 March 1987, with participants from the Swedish Journalist Association (Svenska journalistklubben), regarding press coverage of people of foreign origin in Sweden.

In 1993 the public service magazine Striptease stated that the agreement did not occur, as they followed up on claims made by the Swedish member of parliament Bert Karlsson (NyD) in a debate about refugees. The journalist Johan Brånstad stated that Lilla Saltsjöbadsavtalet was fabricated by the right-wing Sweden Party.

The alleged agreement, and the meeting at which it should have been prepared, has not been confirmed by independent sources. The TV show "Striptease" visited the hotel where this conference should have taken place according to Karlsson and found no booking that could be related to the alleged event. The allegations have nevertheless experienced some spread, mainly in right-wing circles.

== Alleged content ==
In 2007 and 2008, information about the supposed meeting was again "revealed" and enhanced by right-wing extremists, where it was said that the participating journalists agreed to follow certain "recommendations":

- Preferably positively assess and paraphrase Swedish citizens of foreign origin, particularly in the context of youth, sports and artistic activities.
- For events with an element of diverse cultures preferably interview and visually highlight participants of foreign origin.
- During a period of five years, systematically tone down the negative effects criminal activity designated by certain races might have on affected populations. (The five-year period is said to further have been extended up to the present day.)

== Response ==
In a debate on Axess TV in 2007 with journalists Åke Ortmark, Niklas Ekdal, Susanna Popova and Thomas Gür, the latter two confirmed that a "conference for journalists" in the "late 1980s" had taken place, as they were the only two who had opposed the agreement. According to Popova, the agreement in short concerned "if it was time to take off the lid concerning reporting about crime among immigrants, or if the lid was to stay on". Some have seen this as firm evidence, that regardless of the reliability of exactly the Lilla Saltsjöbadsavtalet, such a conference concerning reporting on immigrants had indeed taken place. According to Weine Berg, Popova later said that the conference she and Gür attended was in Stockholm in 1988 (or 1989). Gür further explained that in the meeting they discussed whether the media should continue to ignore reporting the ethnic background of criminals and of ethnic patterns in crime, but strongly denied that some agreement was established. Journalist Janne Josefsson also said that the "bluff" of an agreement was revealed ten years ago on his journalistic investigative show Striptease, but that there are other reasons for the actions by journalists, which he anyway believed were more serious.

In 2009, the editor-in-chief of Kristianstadsbladet, Lasse Bernfalk, described Lilla Saltsjöbadsavtalet as "nothing more than a myth". He had contacted Gür in 2008 following a surge in reader's comments in Kristianstadsbladet about the alleged meeting. Gür had accordingly said that he felt that everyone exaggerated his confirmation of an agreement, as what he spoke about was an internal meeting at Dagens Nyheter. Bernfalk thus concluded that the myth of Lilla Saltsjöbadsavtalet possibly could have originated from some internal editorial meeting in Dagens Nyheter years ago. He further explained that "a large group of right-wing extremists market the myth as the great conspiracy within Swedish mass media where all journalists agreed on how to describe immigration".

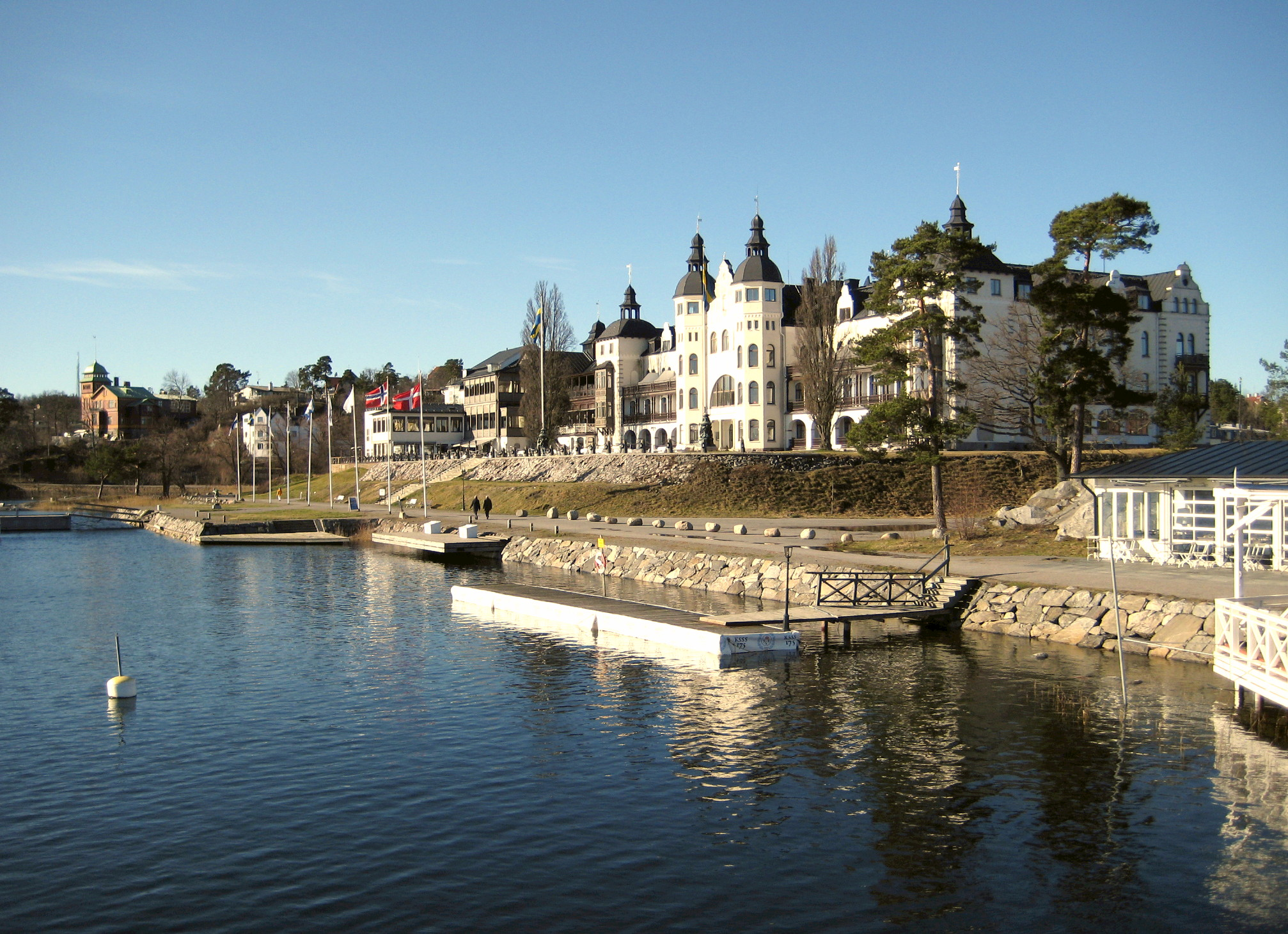
Grand Hotel of Saltsjöbaden.

In 2010, the editor-in-chief of Expressen, Thomas Mattsson, claimed that talk of a "tacit agreement", where "Svenska journalistklubben" met at the Grand Hotel in Saltsjöbaden 1987 and signed Lilla Saltsjöbadsavtalet on trying to cover up problems of the multicultural society", was a myth and conspiracy theory. He however acknowledged that a policy of white pixelization (vitpixling) – i.e. digital pixelization and whitening the skin color of a perpetrator of crime to avoid any "unnecessary identification" – had been used by Expressen. Mattsson said this had been done in accordance with the "Ethical rules for press, television and radio" of the Press Cooperation Board (Pressens Samarbetsnämnd), specifically § 10 (Do not emphasize the person's ethnic origin, gender, nationality, occupation, political affiliation, religious beliefs or sexual orientation if it is irrelevant in this context and is discrediting). Mattson however said that since he became editor-in-chief in 2009, Expressen had a policy of not "white-pixelizating", describing the former policy to have been a "mistake".

== See also ==
- Great Replacement
