= Saltsjöbaden Agreement =

1938 Swedish labour market agreement

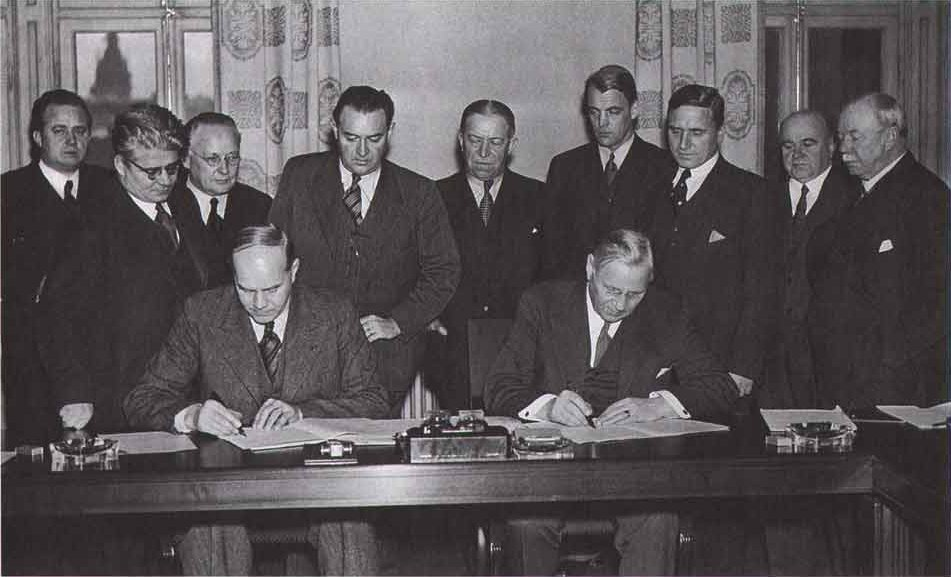
- Signing of the Saltsjöbaden Agreement. August Lindberg of LO sitting to the left and Sigfrid Edström of SAF sitting to the right.
- Type: Labour market-political agreement
- Signed: 20 December 1938
- Location: Saltsjöbaden, Sweden
- Original signatories: Swedish Trade Union Confederation; Swedish Employers Association
- Language: Swedish

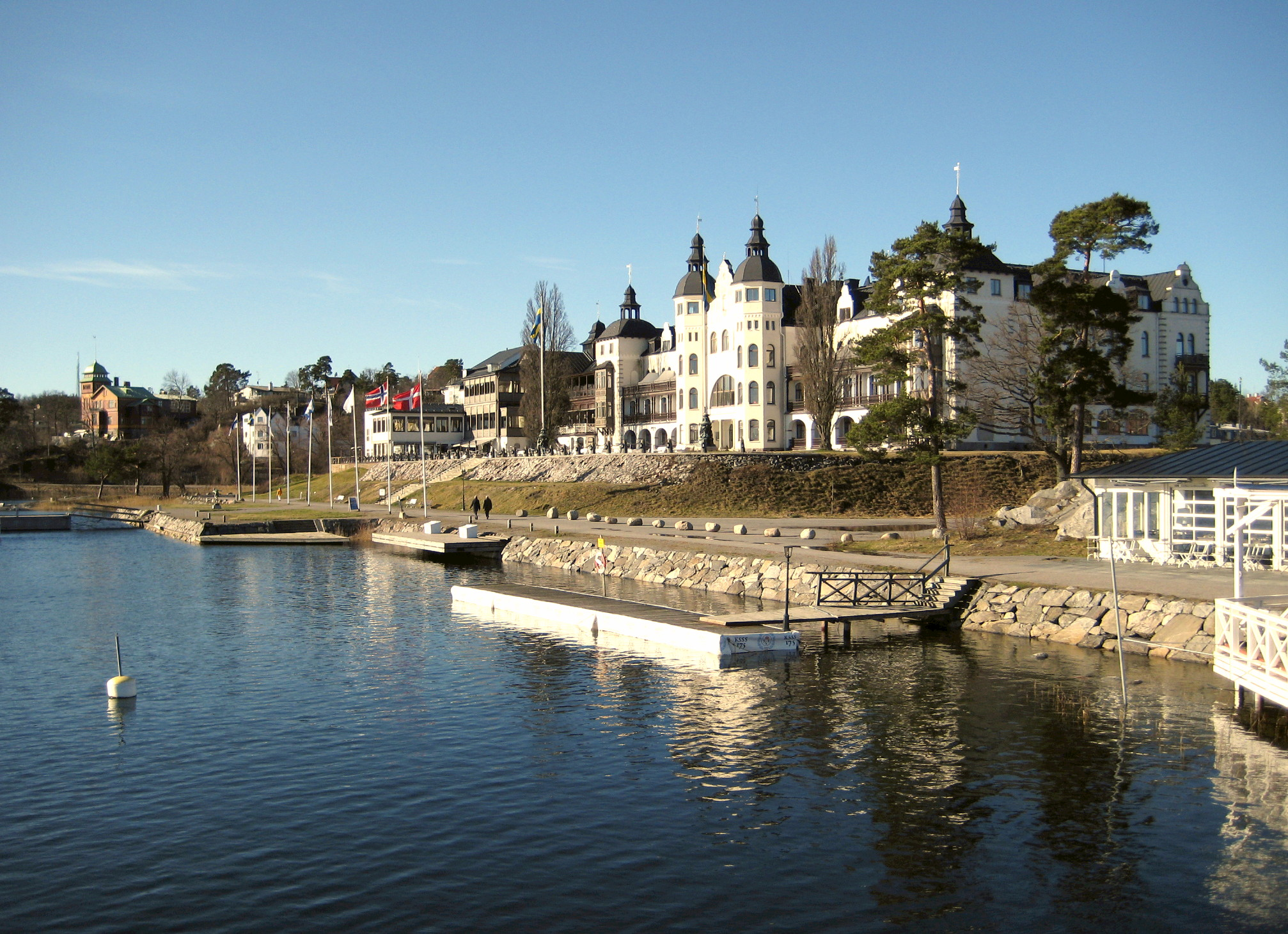
Grand Hotel Saltsjöbaden in Saltsjöbaden, where the treaty was signed.

The Saltsjöbaden Agreement (Swedish: Saltsjöbadsavtalet) is a Swedish collective agreement signed between the Swedish Trade Union Confederation (Swedish: Landsorganisationen, LO) and the Swedish Employers Association (Swedish: Svenska arbetsgivareföreningen, SAF) on 20 December 1938 that has become a model for other agreements. The rules on industrial action have come to be regarded almost as general legal principles of industrial conflicts between labour market forces. The agreement cemented the Swedish social norm that both sides would conclude agreements without interference by government. The agreement is still in effect, with its latest changes being made in 2022.

== History ==
Since the Swedish General Strike of 1909, the labour market had been characterised by unregulated conflict, with the SAF and LO as the main actors. A restrictive legal framework was discussed but was met with criticism from both the SAF and LO. After the Social Democratic government's bill was rejected in parliament in 1935, negotiations started between the SAF and LO, which resulted in the Saltsjöbaden Agreement in 1938. Especially the chapters on industrial action were based largely on the previous proposals.

To implement the Saltsjöbaden Agreement, the LO had to change its statutes. The new statutes included authorising the secretariat to suspend conflict aid to a member union that refuses to approve the secretariat's proposals for settlement. The secretariat may also prohibit a strike if it covers more than three percent of the members of a member union or if it is in danger of becoming so large through a lockout. Member unions of the LO were also required to have a provision in their statutes empowering the board of the confederation to decide on issues of contract and industrial action even against their members' expressed desire.

Reception to the treaty was mixed. The LO-affiliated Swedish Transport Workers' Union (Svenska Transportarbetareförbundet) commented that "in fear of death, one commits suicide" and objected especially to the fourth chapter, which governs industrial action by unions, as "repugnant".

The Saltsjöbaden Agreement launched an era of consensus and cooperation in the Swedish labour market, the so-called "Saltsjöbaden spirit" (Saltsjöbadsandan), which characterised labour policy in Sweden at least until the late 1960s, when the LKAB industrial conflict marked the start of a period of confrontation and decreasing consensus. In the early 1980s, the parties again sought consensus, which culminated in the signing of the Development Agreement (Utvecklingsavtalet) between the LO, SAF and PTK.

Nils Elvander has attention to the Industry Agreement (Industriavtalet) of 1997 between trade unions and employers' associations in manufacturing industry, which has many similarities to the Saltsjöbaden Agreement and could be called a modern equivalent. The traditional Swedish model of industrial relations, containing a prominent role of collective agreements (regulation by the labour market parties themselves) and a climate of co-operation, was then restored after a period of confrontation, particularly in the 1970s.

== See also ==
- Lilla Saltsjöbadsavtalet
