= Prince Erik, Duke of Västmanland =

Swedish prince (1889–1918)

Prince Erik
- Duke of Västmanland
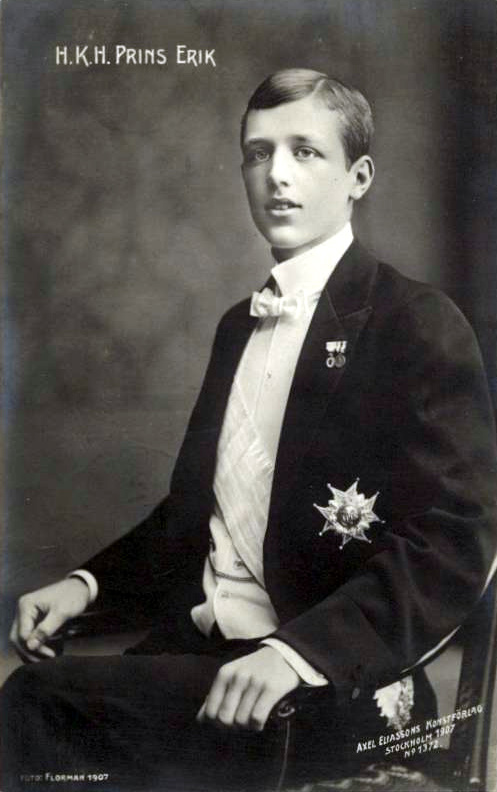
- Prince Erik in 1907
- Born: 20 April 1889; The Royal Palace, Stockholm, Sweden
- Died: 20 September 1918 (aged 29); Drottningholm Palace, Stockholm, Sweden
Names
- Erik Gustav Ludvig Albert
- House: Bernadotte
- Father: Gustav V of Sweden
- Mother: Victoria of Baden

Prince Erik, Duke of Västmanland (Erik Gustav Ludvig Albert; 20 April 1889 – 20 September 1918) was a Swedish and Norwegian prince. He was the third and youngest son of King Gustav V of Sweden and Victoria of Baden and was known to be disabled.

== Life ==
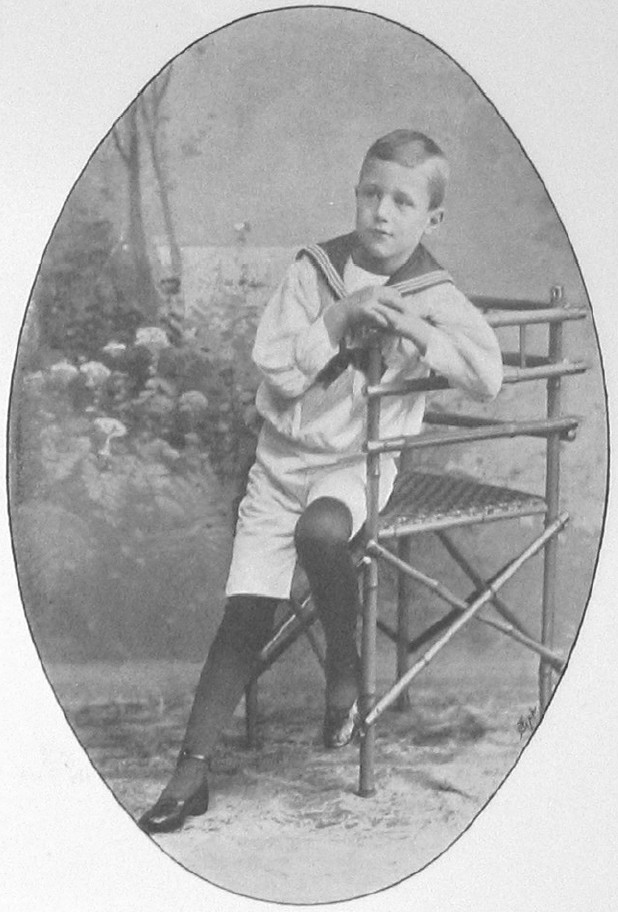
Prince Erik as a child

Prince Erik had epilepsy and mild intellectual disability. His exact condition has not been published, but he may have had an injury at birth or been affected by his mother's strong pre-natal medication for pneumonia. He had pangs of severe anxiety, and Victoria called him "my much loved child of grief". He was described as handsome and physically healthy. His mental disability was not noticeable in brief conversation, but would become apparent if he was engaged at length.

Because of his condition, he was seldom seen in public and led a quiet life away from the public eye, similar to the life of Prince John of the United Kingdom. Because he was a member of the royal family, he was present in official royal photographs, but he had no official tasks. During 1907 to 1909, a residence was built for him away from the public eye in Djursholm, a relatively new garden community north of Stockholm. However, he never moved in, and settled instead on the Balingsholm manor in Huddinge Municipality south of Stockholm.

Erik was cared for by many members of the same staff who were responsible for him and his brothers when they were children: the governess Louise Rinman, referred to by the siblings as Vass, was responsible for the upbringing of him and his siblings when they were little, and in the case of Erik, she continued to be so until his death. Every two weeks he was allowed a trip to the capital, during which he sometimes could be seen visiting the opera; these were the only times he was seen in public except for official photographs.

== Death ==
In 1917, he complained about having to live in such isolation, and it was decided that he should have a new residence closer to Stockholm. However, he died the next year of the Spanish flu at Drottningholm Palace. His parents were not present when he died which, according to official memoirs, caused his father great sorrow in later years. His mother, who herself had poor health and spent parts of the year in Italy, was abroad at the time.

His intended residence on Germaniavägen in Djursholm has been in private ownership since the 1960s and today (2011) is the private residence of South Africa's ambassador to Sweden.

== Titles, honours and arms ==
=== Honours ===
- Sweden-Norway:
  - Knight and Commander of the Seraphim, 20 April 1889
  - Knight of the Order of Charles XIII, 20 April 1889
  - Commander Grand Cross of the Sword, 20 April 1889
  - Commander Grand Cross of the Polar Star, 20 April 1889
  - Grand Cross of St. Olav, with Collar, 20 April 1889
  - Knight of the Norwegian Lion, 21 January 1904
- Denmark: Knight of the Elephant, 20 November 1912
- France: Grand Cross of the Legion of Honour
- German Empire:
  - Knight of the Black Eagle
  - Grand Cross of the Red Eagle
  - Baden: Knight of the House Order of Fidelity

=== Titles ===
- 1889-1905: His Royal Highness Prince Erik of Sweden and Norway, Duke of Västmanland
- 1905-1918: His Royal Highness Prince Erik of Sweden, Duke of Västmanland

=== Arms ===
Prince Erik's coat of arms

Prince Erik's monogram

== Ancestors ==
Ancestors of Prince Erik, Duke of Västmanland

8. Oscar I of Sweden
4. Oscar II of Sweden
9. Princess Josephine of Leuchtenberg
2. Gustaf V of Sweden
10. William, Duke of Nassau
5. Princess Sophia of Nassau
11. Princess Pauline of Württemberg
1. Prince Erik, Duke of Västmanland
12. Leopold, Grand Duke of Baden
6. Frederick I, Grand Duke of Baden
13. Princess Sophie of Sweden
3. Princess Victoria of Baden
14. William I, German Emperor
7. Princess Louise of Prussia
15. Princess Augusta of Saxe-Weimar-Eisenach
