= 34th (Pomeranian) Fusiliers "Queen Victoria of Sweden" =

Swedish, Prussian and German army regiment

The 34th (Pomeranian) Fusiliers "Queen Victoria of Sweden" was a regiment of the Royal Prussian Army, and later of the Imperial German Army until the end of the First World War. The regiment was first founded under the rule of the Swedish Empire in 1720, under the name the Queen's Life Regiment of Foot (Swedish: Drottningens livregemente till fots). It was an enlisted infantry regiment that was set up in Stralsund in 1720, during the Great Northern War. It operated under Swedish rule until 1815, when the regiment was transferred together with the dominion of Swedish Pomerania to Prussia following a decision at the Congress of Vienna.

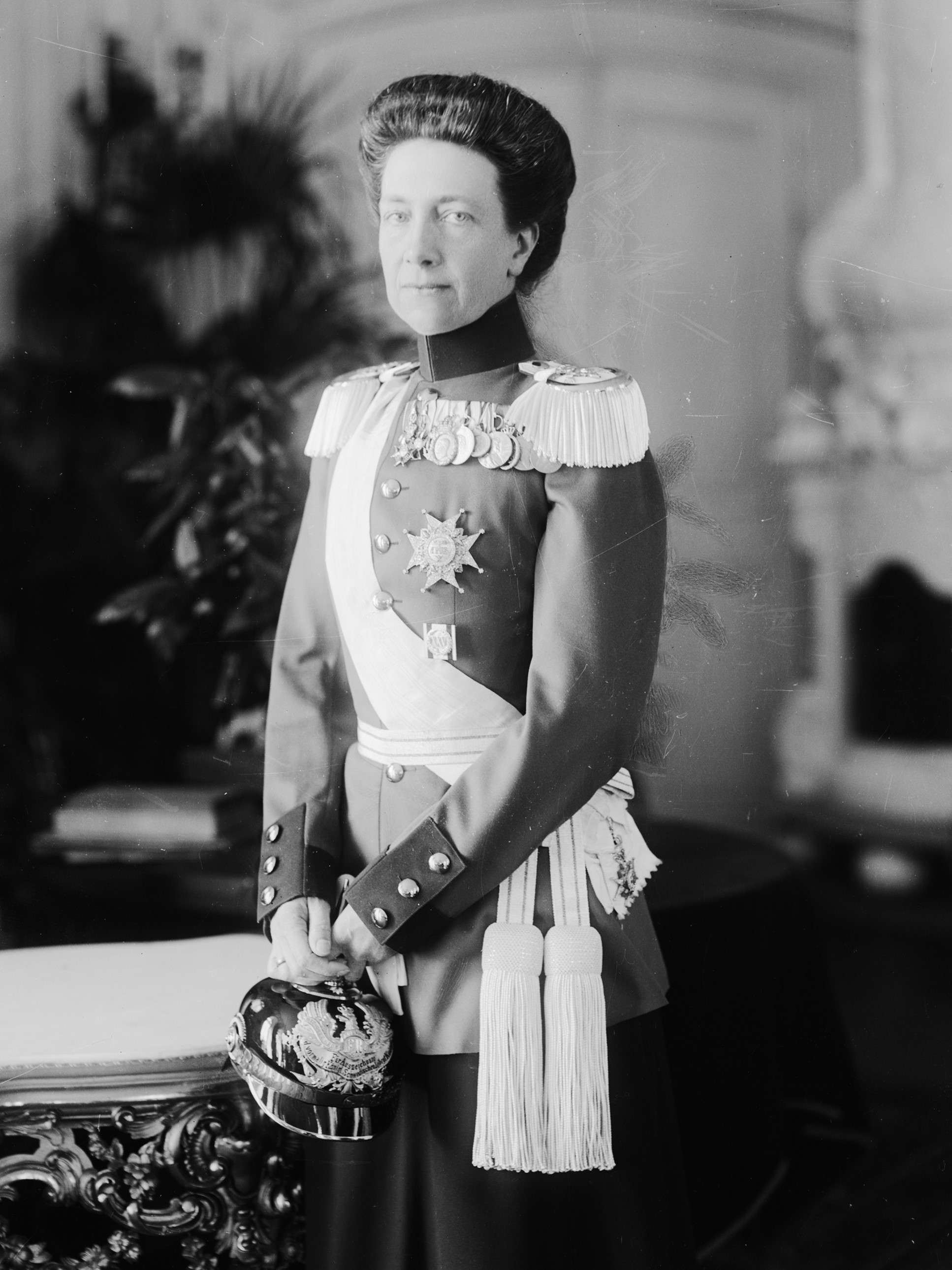
Queen Victoria of Sweden in uniform as an honorary Colonel-in-Chief of the regiment.

== History ==
=== Swedish service 1722–1815 ===
The regiment served as a garrison regiment and was created from the Västgöta Regiment and parts of the Uppland Regiment. From 1722 the regiment was called "The Queen's Life Regiment of Foot". During the 1750s, the regiment was occasionally stationed in mainland Sweden. The regiment participated in most of the wars that Sweden waged at this time; The Pomeranian War (1757-1762), the Russo-Swedish War (1788-1790), the Finnish War (1808-1809) and the Napoleonic Wars against France in the early 19th century.

Swedish Pomerania was ceded as compensation to Denmark after the Treaty of Kiel in which Sweden acquired Norway, however Sweden and Denmark agreed with Prussia in June 1815 that the area would go to Prussia instead. The regiment's soldiers and officers were released from their oath to Sweden on October 23 of the same year and handed over by Lieutenant General Gustaf Boije to the Prussian government's representative, Colonel Wilhelm von Steinwehr. Boije took the regimental colours, as well as a handful of officers who had not sworn allegiance to Prussia, back to Sweden. The regiment then changed its name to the 34th (Pomeranian) Fusiliers Regiment (German: Füsilier-Regiment Nr. 34).

==== Gallery ====
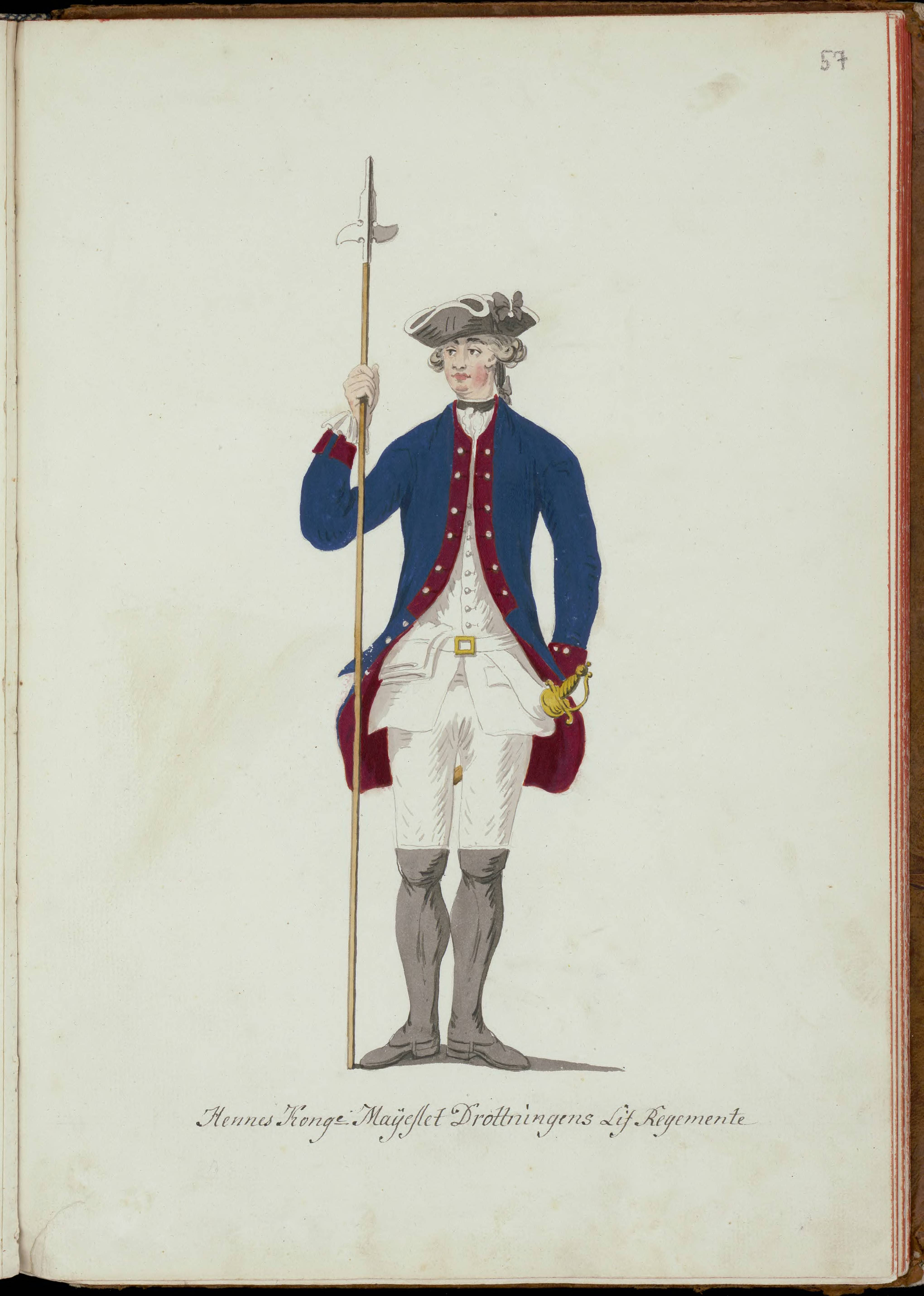
Soldiers of the regiment in Swedish uniform m/1765.

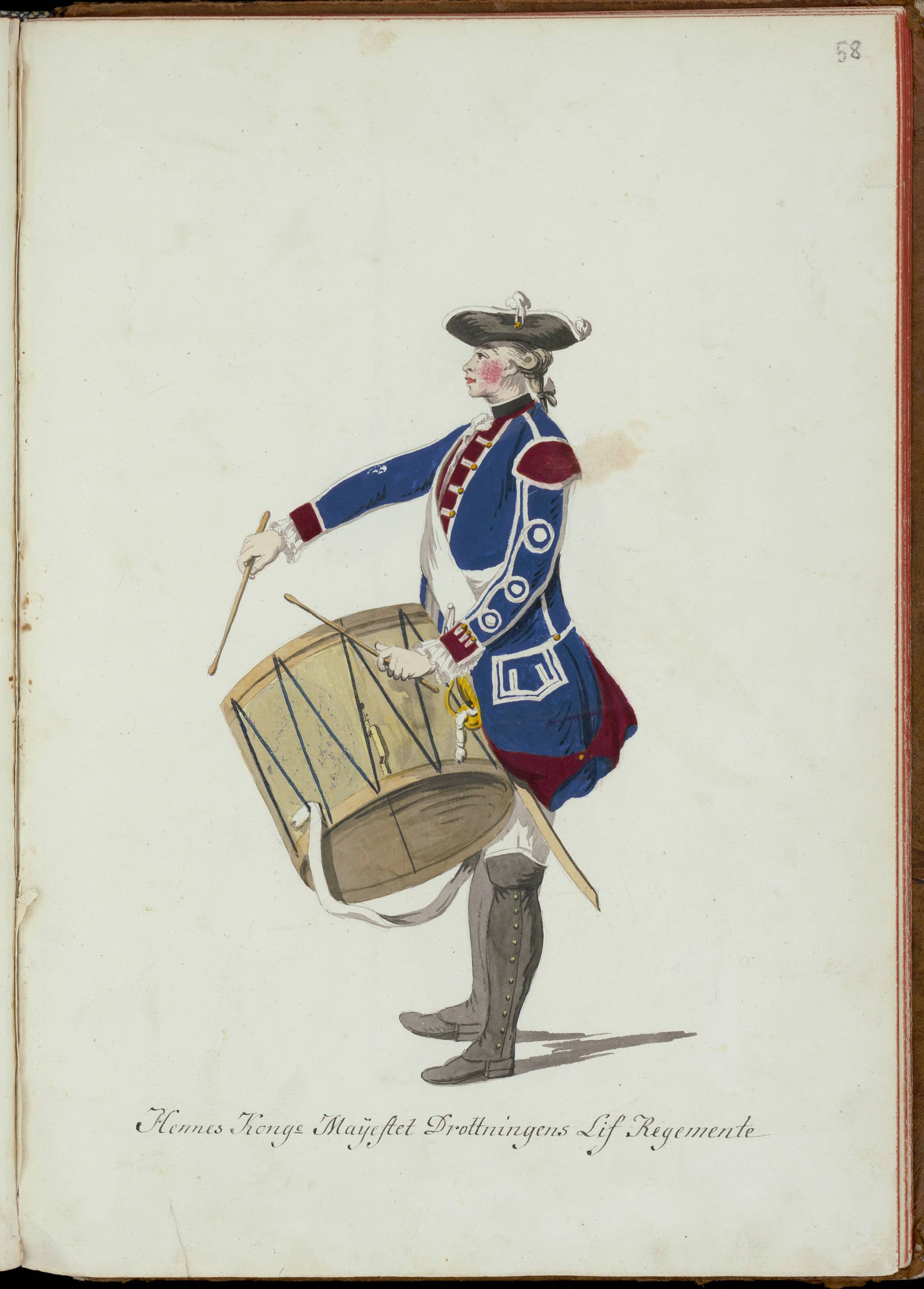
Drummers of the regiment in Swedish uniform m/1765.

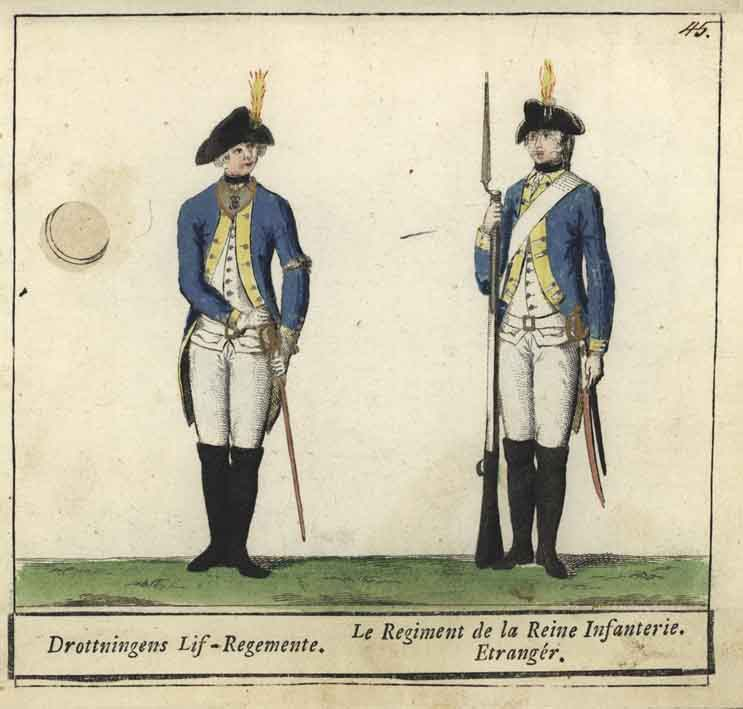
Soldiers of the regiment in Swedish uniform m/1779.

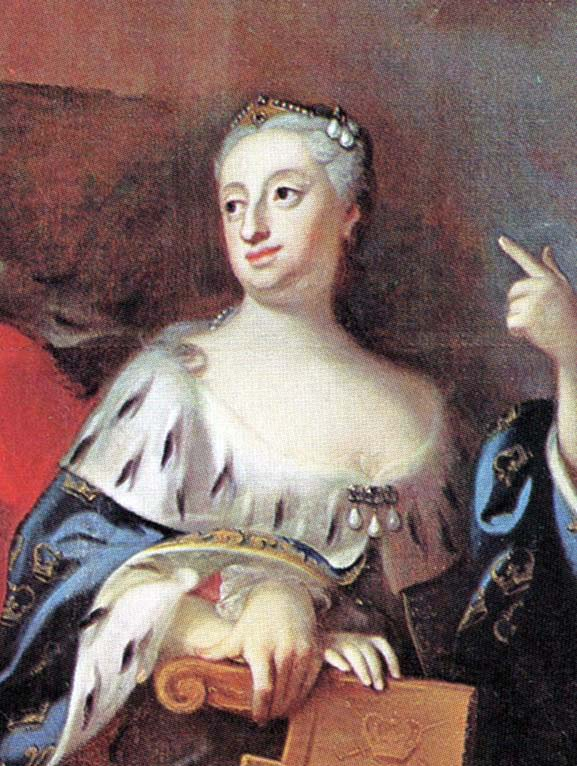
Ulrica Eleonor, Queen of Sweden 1718–1741.

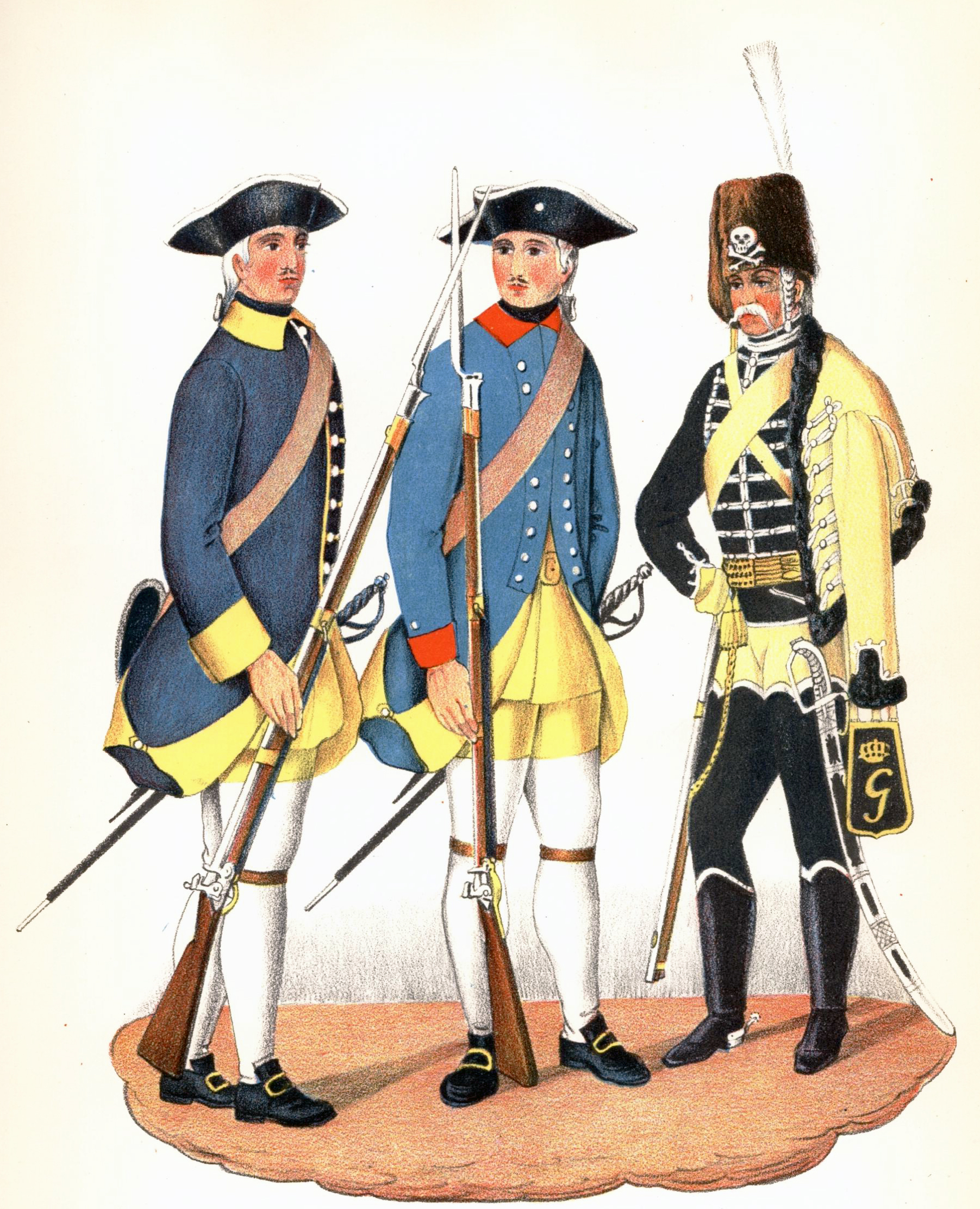
Swedish uniforms during the Pomeranian War 1757-1762

Standard of the Queen's Life Regement of Foot.

=== Prussian service 1815–1919 ===
After the Congress of Vienna and the transferral of Swedish Pomerania to the Prussian Crown, the regiment was reorganized and lead under new Prussian officers, but remained garrisoned in Stralsund. The regiment fought with distinction in most of the wars that Prussia waged during the 19th century; the Austro-Prussian War (1866) and the Franco-Prussian War (1870-1871).

In fall 1908, the new royal couple of Sweden, King Gustaf V and Queen Victoria of Baden got a state visit from the Queen's cousin, German Emperor Wilhelm II. They exchanged honours, with Kaiser Wilhelm II becoming a Knight of the Order of Vasa, and Gustaf V becoming the honorary Colonel-in-Chief of the 3rd (Queen Elizabeth) Guards Grenadiers and his wife Victoria the Chief of the 34th (Pomeranian) Fusiliers, whom got its new name 34th (Pomeranian) Fusiliers "Queen Victoria of Sweden". During the First World War the regiment fought on the Eastern Front, where the regimental colours of the Regiment's 1st Battalion fell into the hands of the Imperial Russian Army as a war trophy. (Note: https://btgv.ru/uniform/german-banners-trophies-of-the-russian-army-of-the-great-war)

==== Gallery ====
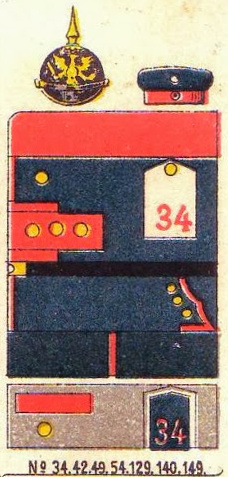
Colour scheme of the uniform, Fusilier Regiment "Queen Victoria of Sweden" (Pomeranian) No. 34.

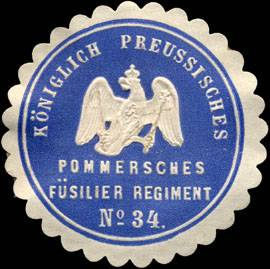
Seal and Mark of the Prussian "Pomeranian Fusiliers Regiment"

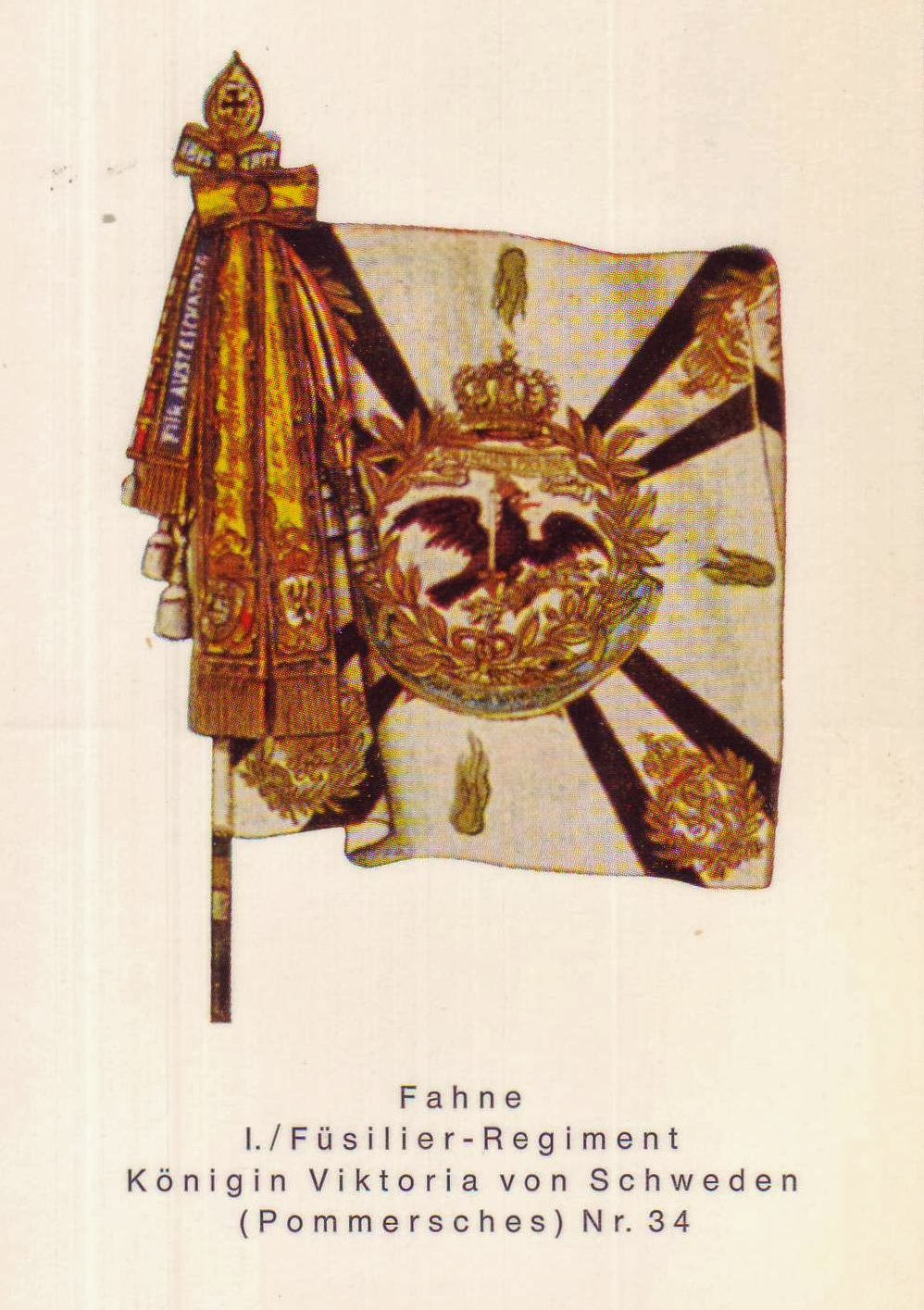
Standard of 34th (Pomeranian) Fusilier Regiment "Queen Victoria of Sweden"

== See also ==
- List of Imperial German infantry regiments
- List of Imperial German cavalry regiments
- List of Imperial German artillery regiments
