= Battle of Kaipiais =

- Part of the Russo-Swedish War (1788–90)
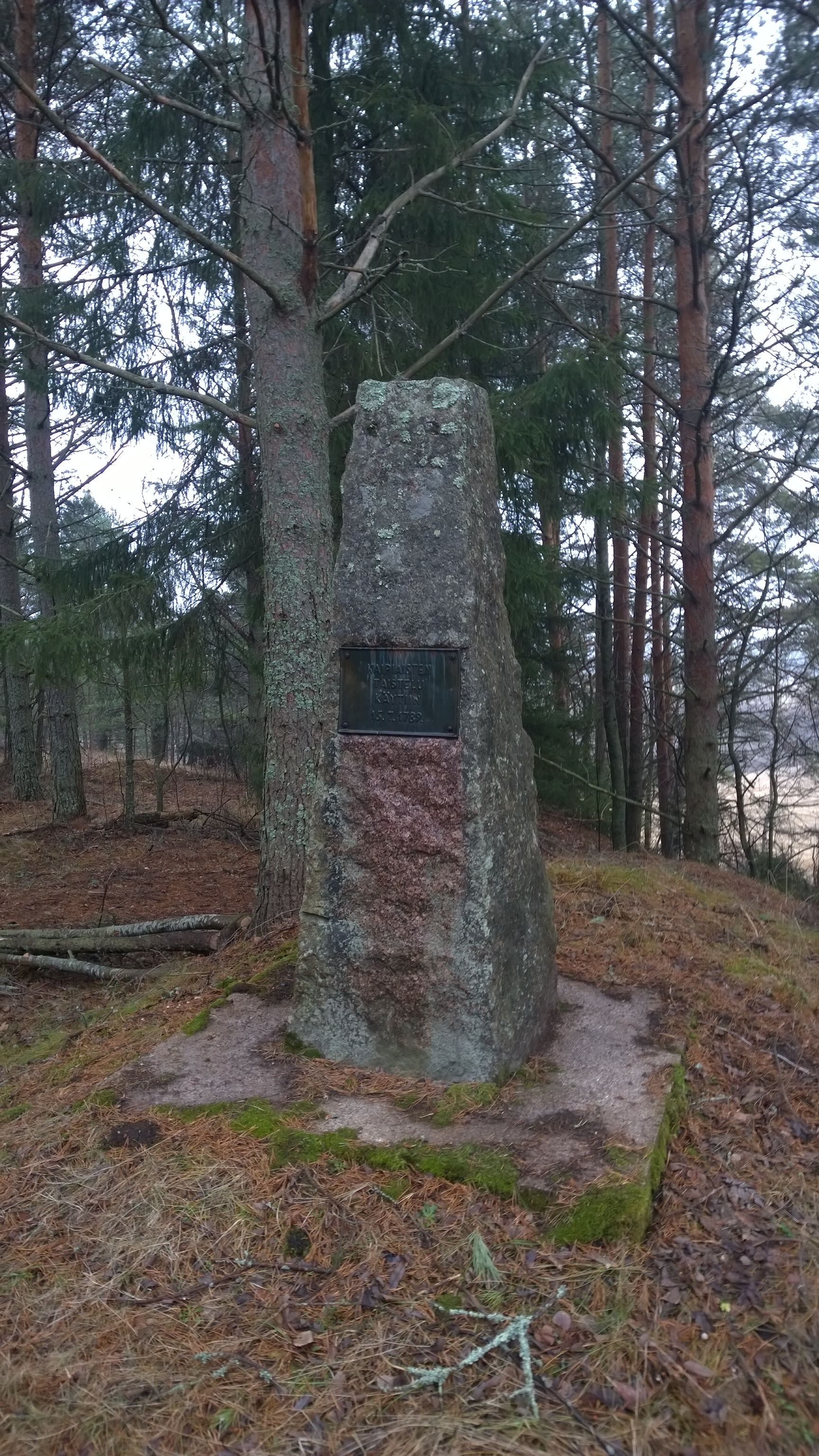
- Battle of Kaipiais
Date	July 15, 1789
Location	Kaipiais, Finland
Result	Russian victory

Belligerents
Sweden	(Russia) Russian Empire

Commanders and leaders
Lars Fredrik von Kaulbars	Fedor Denisov

Strength
2,300 men	4,000 men

Casualties and losses
265 killed, wounded and captured	Unknown

The Battle of Kaipiais took place on July 15, 1789 during Russo-Swedish War (1788–90), between Sweden and the Russian Empire. The Swedes lost the battle and had to withdraw with a loss of 265 men.
