= Vinbräcka strike =

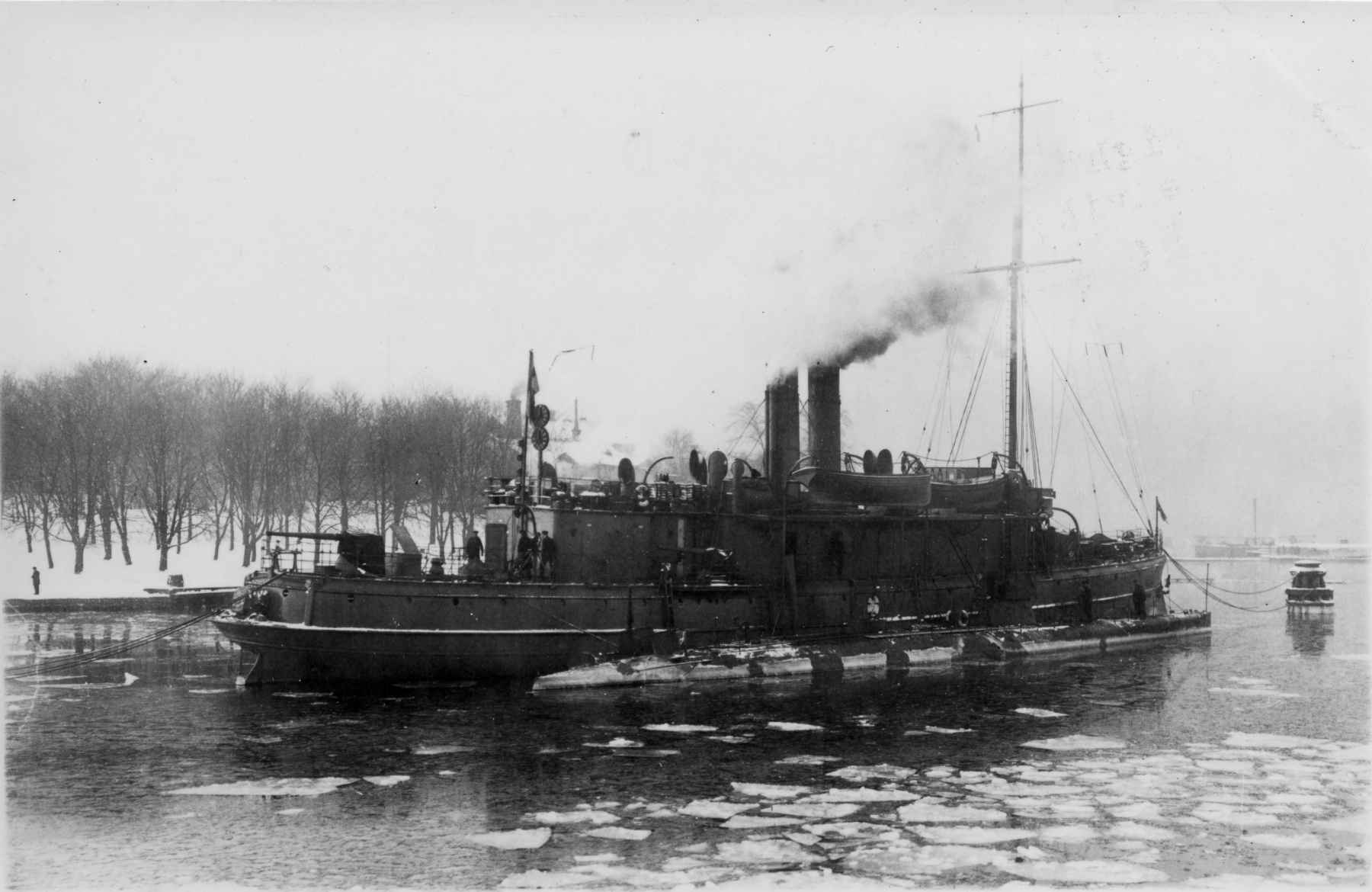
- HSwMS Skäggald along with the submarine, HSwMS Hvalen
| Date | 1908 |
| Location | Vinbräcka, Sweden |
| Result | Government/Company victory |

Belligerents
| Sweden; Skandinaviska bolaget | Strikers |

Commanders and leaders
| Hyllengren (WIA); Captain Liljecrantz | Unknown |

Units involved
| HSwMS Skäggald; Flora; Rex | |

Strength
| Sweden: 1 gunboat 1 rowboat Presumably 116 soldiers Unknown number of police and bailiffs Skandinaviska Bolaget: 1 steamship 1 smaller vessel Unknown number of strikebreakers | 4 July: ~100–150 7 July: ~400–600 |

Casualties and losses
| Unknown | Unknown |

The Vinbräcka strike, also known as the Vinbräcka conflict or the Vinbräcka riots, was a strike conducted by the workers of the mining company Skandinaviska Bolaget (English: The Scandinavian company) in Vinbräcka, Bohuslän. The conflict started when strikebreakers hired from England attempted to carry out the striker's work by unloading stone from the steamship Flora but were faced with resistance from the strikers. Police were called in to engage the strikers but did not manage to quell the uprising. Eventually, the Swedish Navy vessel HSwMS Skäggald was called in to restore order. The gunboat bombarded the strikers and landed a small force of soldiers which made the strikers disperse.

== Background ==
During the 1800s, the stone mining industry in Bohuslän had seen much growth leading to people from all over Sweden emigrating there in search of work. Although the workers were initially unorganized, the start of the 20th century saw many workers' unions being established in the area with the miners often being described as especially radical which would often spark conflict between the workers and the employers. This was the case in 1908 when the workers of the stone mining company, Skandinaviska Bolaget went on strike in Vinbräcka.

== Strike ==
To compensate for the loss of workers due to the strike, the employers hired numerous strikebreakers from England being transported by junkboat.

=== 4–6 July ===
On 4 July, the steamship Flora had sailed from Gothenburg to unload stone in the harbor of Vinbräcka. However, one of the strikebreaker's junkboats, the Rex, was blocking the Flora's way. The commotion managed to draw in a crowd of circa 100–150 strikers who were there to witness the strikebreaker's troubles. The striker's presence saw the deployment of the police in order to provide cover for the strikebreakers, however, this angered the crowd making one start throwing cooked potatoes towards the law enforcement. Conflict erupted when one policeman responded by hitting one of the strikers in the head with his baton, the workers started throwing stones at the police and blocked any attempt by the strikebreakers to conduct their work. During the day the crowd grew to around 400 people which was too much for the 6 policemen present to handle drawing the conflict to a standstill.

On 6 July, some of the cargo onboard Flora was destroyed by strikers. During the riots, the strikers were reported to have sung several Swedish communist songs including the "Lumplena Visan" and "På Åbyfjordens Strand".

=== 7 July ===
At 7:00 on 7 July, the gunboat HSwMS Skäggald arrived under Captain Liljecrantz to aid the strikebreakers in conducting their work. The strikers were very loud upon the gunship's arrival making Liljecrantz threaten the demonstrators with military action if they were to become violent.

At 10:00, the strikebreakers resumed their work under the cover of HSwMS Skäggald as well as additional police forces which had made landfall to re-enforce the strikebreakers. Several bailiffs had also made their way to Vinbräcka, including the crown chief sheriff Hyllengren. The strikers bombarded law enforcement as well as the strikebreakers with rocks; one rock, originally aimed at a policeman, accidentally hit Hyllengren in the back of the head so that blood emerged from the wound. This prompted Hyllengren to yell out to the strikers "Ser ni hvad ni gjort!? Nu må det vara slut!" (English: Do you see what you have done!? Now this has to end!). Shortly thereafter, gunfire rang out from the strikers nearly hitting another sheriff. The police thus responded with gunfire of their own as the strikebreakers retreated to the Rex, fire also came from Skäggald and allegedly also by the strikebreakers, but despite the efforts of the government forces, the strikers continued to block any attempts by Flora to unload her cargo. The soldiers aboard HSwMS Skäggald thus made landfall and fired over the heads of the strikers which finally made them retreat up towards the mountain.

== Aftermath ==
The strikebreakers managed to conduct their work undisturbed under the protection of the government forces. They were finished at 17:30 and headed out to sea onboard Rex under the continued escort of Skäggald.

The following years have seen much debate over if the shots from HSwMS Skäggald were blank or not and some also alleged that the strikebreakers also played a role in bombarding the strikers. Nevertheless, this was the first instance in Swedish history where the military opened fire against strikers.

== See also ==
- Ådalen shootings
- 1909 Swedish general strike
