= Judge referee =

Swedish judicial officer

A judge referee (Swedish: justitiesekreterare, previously known as revisionssekreterare (Note: Both justitiesekreterare and revisionssekreterare are translated as judge referee.)), is a rapporteur in the Swedish Supreme Court and the Supreme Administrative Court of Sweden. Judge referees are responsible for the preparation of cases and refer the case before the members of the court.

Judge referees are employed for a maximum of six years with the possibility of an extension of a maximum of two years. If there are special reasons, the employment may be extended by a further maximum of two years. Only those who are Swedish citizens may hold or exercise employment as a judge referee. If knowledge of a particular area of law is needed, however, even a person who is not a lawyer may be employed as a judge referee at the Supreme Administrative Court.

== History ==
Before 1972, judge referees belonged to Nedre justitierevisionen, an agency formally separate from the Supreme Court of Sweden. Thereafter it has been officially organized under the Supreme Court.
