= 1909 Swedish general strike =

Swedish general strike

Swedish General Strike (The Great Strike of 1909) (sv. Storstrejken)
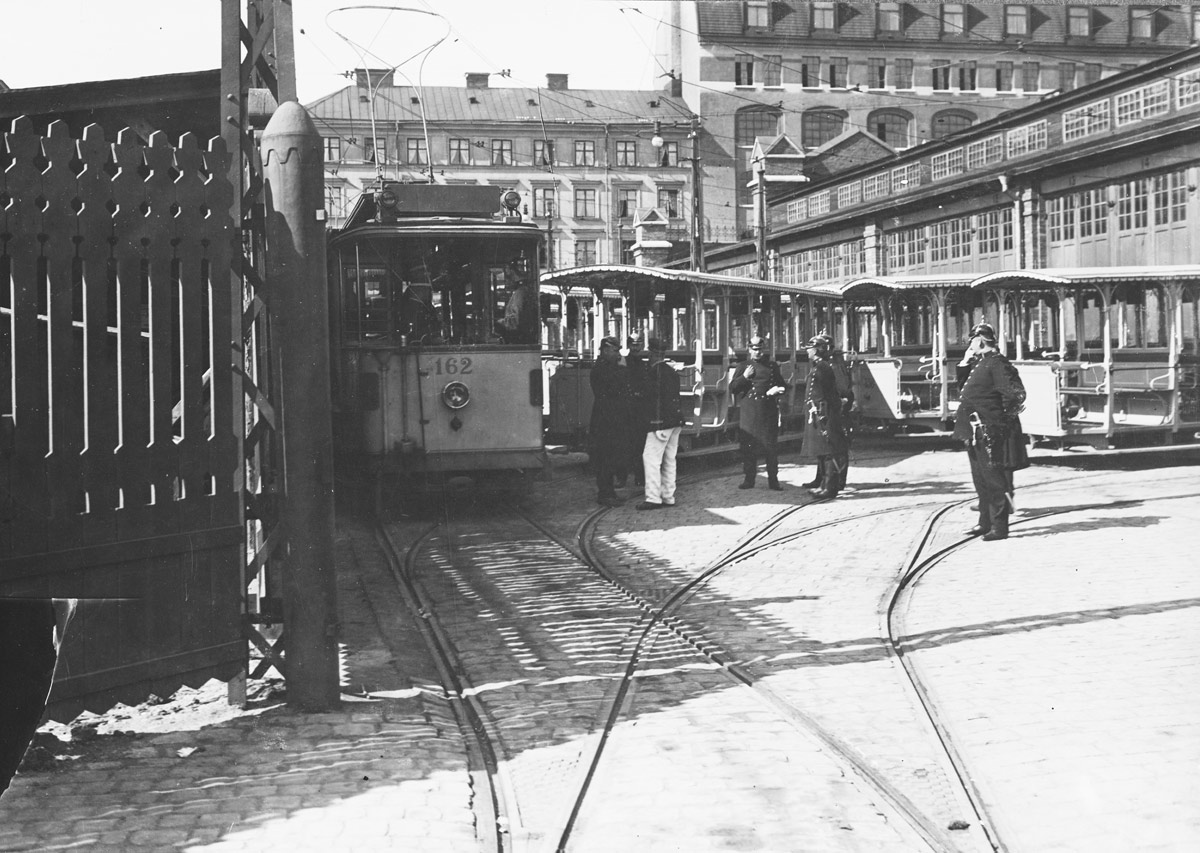
- Police officers guard streetcars during the general strike
- Date: August 4 – September 6, 1909
- Cause: SAF lock-out of 160,000 workers.
- Outcome: LO defeated and lost significant numbers of membership. Employers start blacklisting workers.

The Swedish general strike (Swedish: Storstrejken) of August 4 to September 6, 1909, was a general work stoppage by over 300,000 individuals all over Sweden. It was the first major conflict between the Swedish Trade Union Confederation (Landsorganisationen, LO), and the Swedish Employers Association (Svenska Arbetsgivareföreningen, SAF). The losses to employers was estimated to be around 25 million Swedish kronor.

Recession was having a negative impact on many companies and the SAF therefore wanted to lower wages. A lockout of 80,000 workers in the textile-, sawmill- and pulp industry was put in effect. The LO answered with a call for general strike. Only healthcare workers and a few other skeleton professions were exempt from the strike.

Funds were short and forced the union to end the strike after a month, resulting in major membership losses. The LO lost almost half of its members, some to the newly formed anarcho-syndicalist Central Organisation of the Workers of Sweden. The anarcho-syndicalists argued that the management of the LO had handled the strike half-heartedly and only started it to curb its members' more radical stance. Employers also took the opportunity to lay off approximately 20,000 workers, which also contributed to mass defections from LO when workers were forced to leave the union to keep their jobs. Emigration also rose as a consequence of the strike.

The failure of the general strike formed an important backdrop to the Saltsjöbaden Agreement of 1938.

== See also ==
- Vinbräcka strike
