= Swedish Employers' Confederation =

Trade group in the Scandinavian country

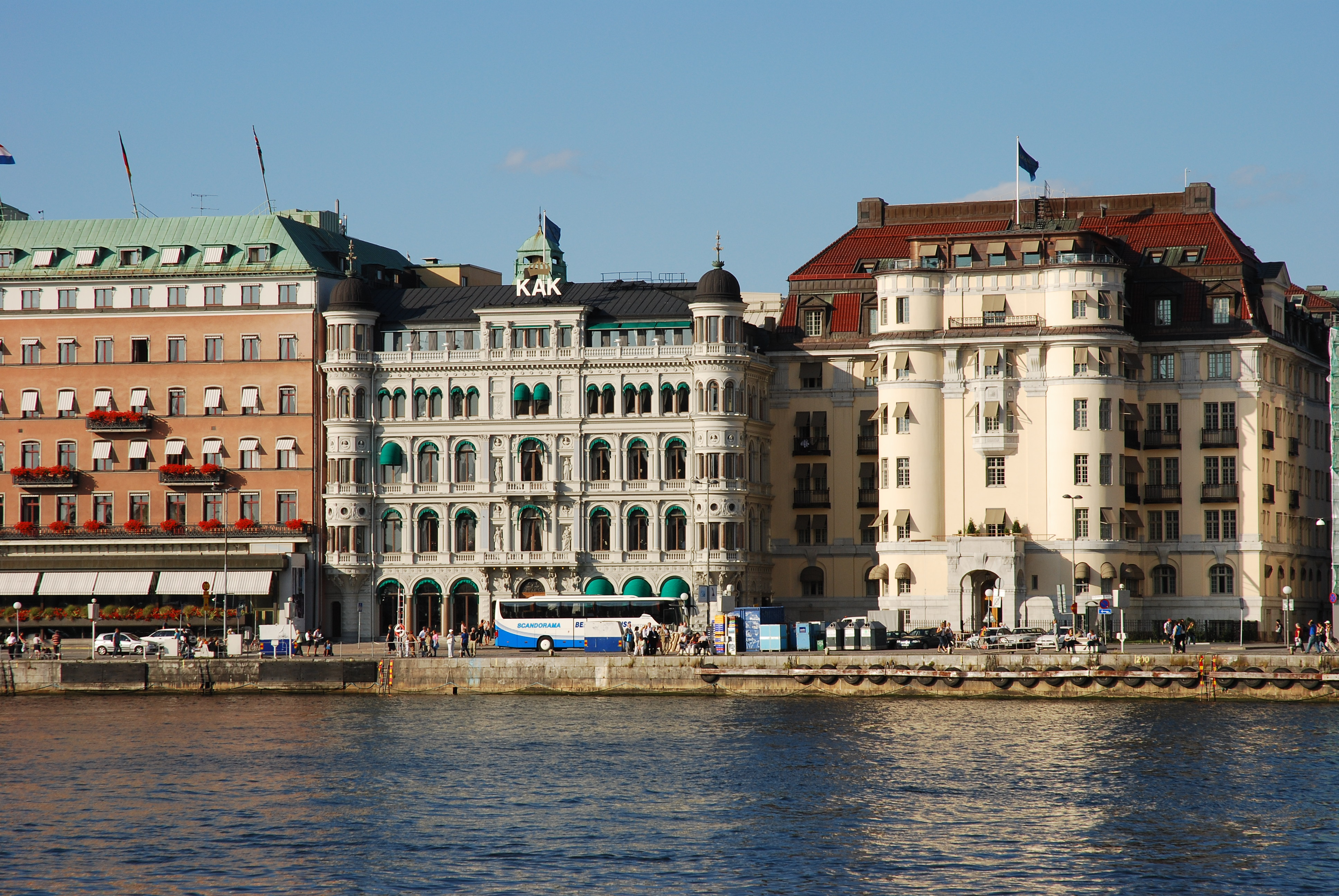
SAF-borgen (right), the SAF headquarters from 1934 to 2001

The Swedish Employers' Confederation (Swedish: Svenska Arbetsgivareföreningen, SAF) was a Swedish employers' organization founded in 1902. In 2001, SAF merged with the Federation of Swedish Industries (Sveriges Industriförbund) to form the Confederation of Swedish Enterprise.
