= Krasiński Palace =

Coordinates: 52.2493°N 21.0038°E

Krasiński Palace Pałac Krasińskich
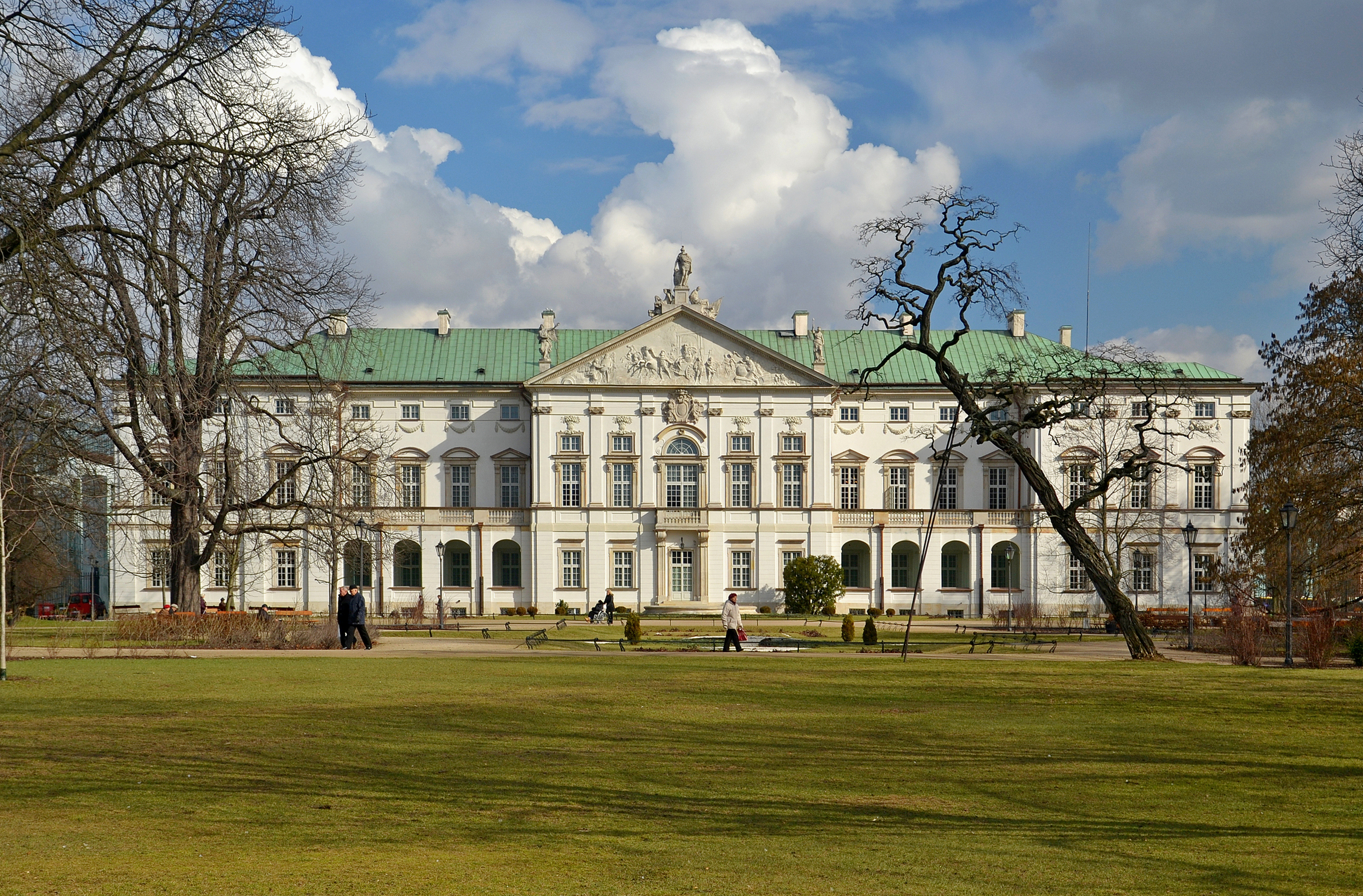
- Krasiński Palace, view from the gardens
- Interactive map of the Krasiński Palace; Pałac Krasińskich area

General information
- Architectural style: Baroque
- Location: Warsaw, Poland
- Construction started: 1677
- Completed: 1683
- Demolished: 1944
- Client: Jan Dobrogost Krasiński

Design and construction
- Architect: Tylman van Gameren

Historic Monument of Poland
- Designated: 1994-09-08
- Part of: Warsaw – historic city center with the Royal Route and Wilanów
- Reference no.: M.P. 1994 nr 50 poz. 423

The Krasiński Palace (Polish: Pałac Krasińskich), also known as the Palace of the Commonwealth (Polish: Pałac Rzeczypospolitej), is a reconstructed Baroque palace in Warsaw, Poland, on Krasiński Square (Plac Krasińskich). Initially erected between 1677 and 1683 for the powerful Krasiński family, it was heavily damaged during World War II and rebuilt in the mid-20th century.

== History and architecture ==
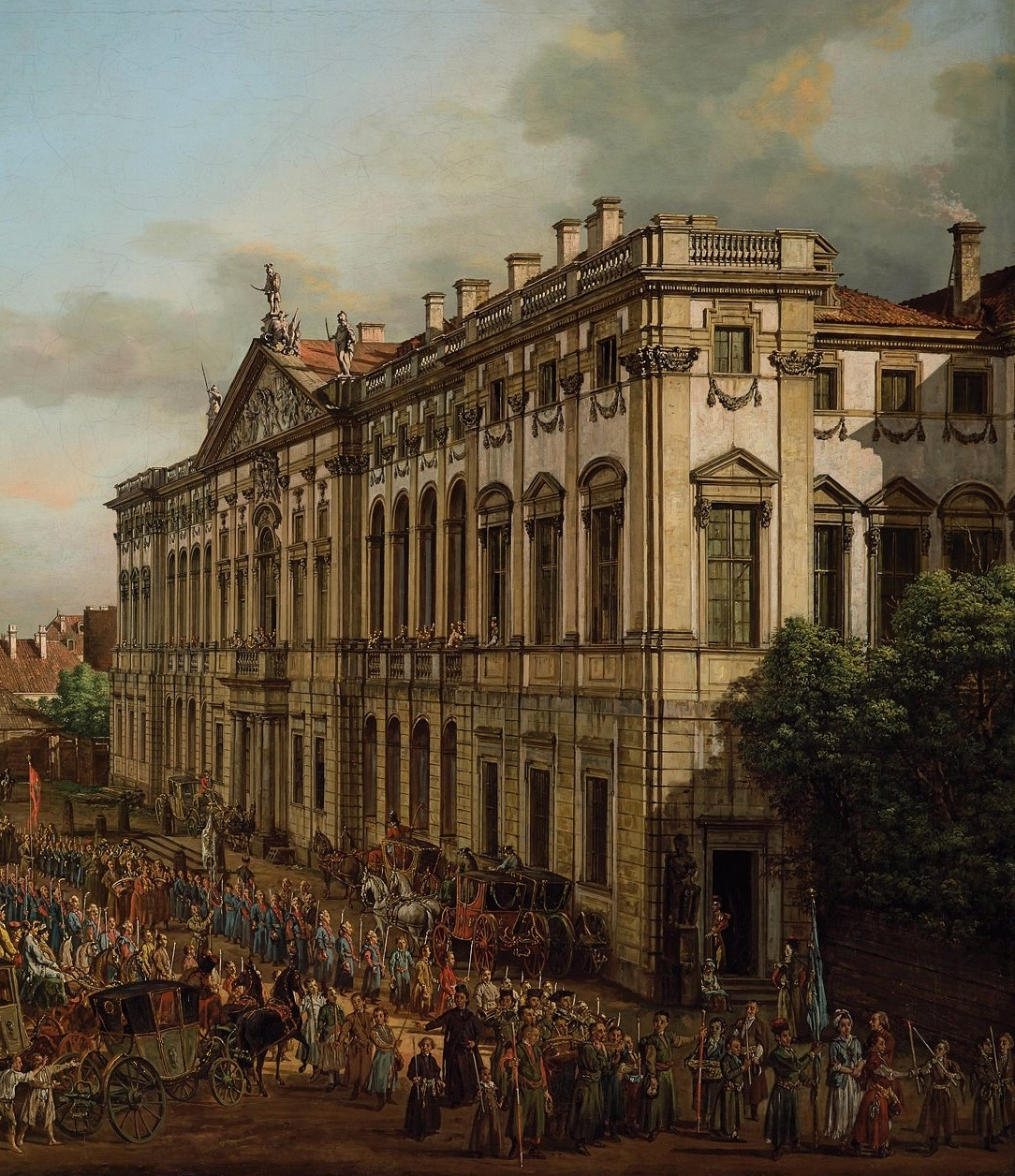
Krasiński Palace, 1770. Painting by Bernardo Bellotto.

The palace was built in 1677–83 for the Voivode of Płock, Jan Dobrogost Krasiński, according to design by Tylman van Gameren. It was decorated with pediment reliefs showing the triumph of the legendary "ancestor" of the Ślepowron and Korwin Polish clans, the Roman commander Manius Valerius Maximus Corvinus Messalla (263 BC) and sculptural work, all by Andreas Schlüter.

Jan Dobrogost Krasiński, who also served as the royal clerk (Referendarz), was a descendant of old Mazovian nobility and an heir to a large fortune. After his father's death he wished to erect a magnificent residence in the capital which was to fulfill his excessive political ambitions and show his enormous pride, which made him cultivate and develop a 16th-century legend about the antique origin and alleged royal connections of his family.

Krasiński was well acquainted with French culture and architecture; he was interested in hiring qualified and renowned French artists and architects that would perform the work. He kept a detailed accountancy book in which he systematically recorded progress in construction. The whole idea was realized according to the design of Tylman van Gameren. He was of Dutch origin, educated in Italy, and he was brought to Poland by the Lubomirski family. He made a large number of various designs for Lubomirskis, the Royal Family, the representatives of different noblemen and gentry families as well as for the Catholic Church. Some Warsaw architects were also employed to build the palace as building contractors, as suppliers of materials or to control the master craftsmen, bricklayers or artisans. These people were Joseph Bellotti, Jacob Solari, Izydor Affaita and Maderni. The main role in decorating the palace was played by German sculptor, Andreas Schlüter, who had previously cooperated with Tylman.

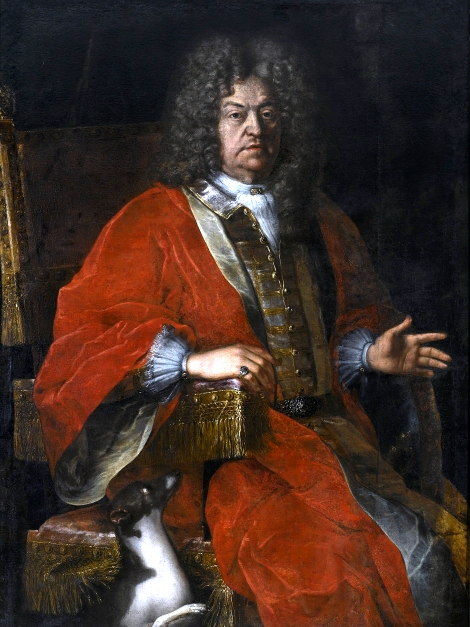
Jan Dobrogost Krasiński

The first floor porte-fenêtre (vertical French door and window) was crowned with a cartouche supported by two angels bearing the founder's monogram JK for Jan Krasiński. The frescoes were made by John III Sobieski's court painter Michelangelo Palloni. Among his notable works in the palace, most worth mentioning are the plafond and frescoes in the supraportes (the space between the portal and ceiling) of the palace's vestibule. Moulding which remain in vestibule and partly in the stairwell, also the heads of pilasters or festoons on external elevations made of stucco as well as the armorial cartouche of the façade from the garden side were made by unknown artists under the supervision of Joseph Belloti. The lost paintings in the vestibule destroyed during World War II were painted by Michael Palloni. The interiors were partially finished by 1699. Other paintings by Albrecht Dürer, Antonio da Correggio, Rembrandt and Peter Paul Rubens are no longer present.

The palace-garden complex was created on a vast property between Długa and Świętojerska Streets, in the place of the old manor house with small garden that belonged to Krasiński. Krasiński purchased some surrounding plots to extend the gardens. According to Gameren's conception, the palace was intended as a French style palace entre cour et jardin (between the entrance court and the garden) with cour d'honneur, two symmetrical outbuildings, parterre garden (à la française) with three radial alleys and a palace in the center of the axis, but it was never fully accomplished.

In 1765 the palace was purchased by the Rzeczpospolita (Commonwealth; the Polish State) and became the seat of the Treasury Commission. After a fire in 1783 it was remodelled according to Domenico Merlini's design. During the interwar period, the palace housed the Supreme Court of Poland.

The palace was burned down and partially demolished by the Germans during World War II, with the outer shell remaining mostly intact. Today it is a part of the Polish National Library's Special Collections Section (specializing in manuscripts and old prints) from the Załuski Library (only 5% of the former collection remains in the palace, the rest was deliberately destroyed by the Germans after the collapse of the Warsaw Uprising in October 1944). Between 2014–2016, the palace underwent an extensive revitalization.

On 21 May 2024, the palace opened to visitors for the first time in its history. It houses a large permanent exhibition consisting of some of the priceless objects from the National Library including Sankt Florian Psalter, Holy Cross Sermons, manuscripts of the chronicles of Gallus Anonymus and Wincenty Kadłubek, Medieval and Renaissance works of European thinkers as well as works by Jan Kochanowski, Adam Mickiewicz, Juliusz Słowacki, Frédéric Chopin, Henryk Sienkiewicz, Zbigniew Herbert, Henryk Górecki and Agnieszka Osiecka. The palace offers a free admission six days per week except on Tuesdays.

== Images ==
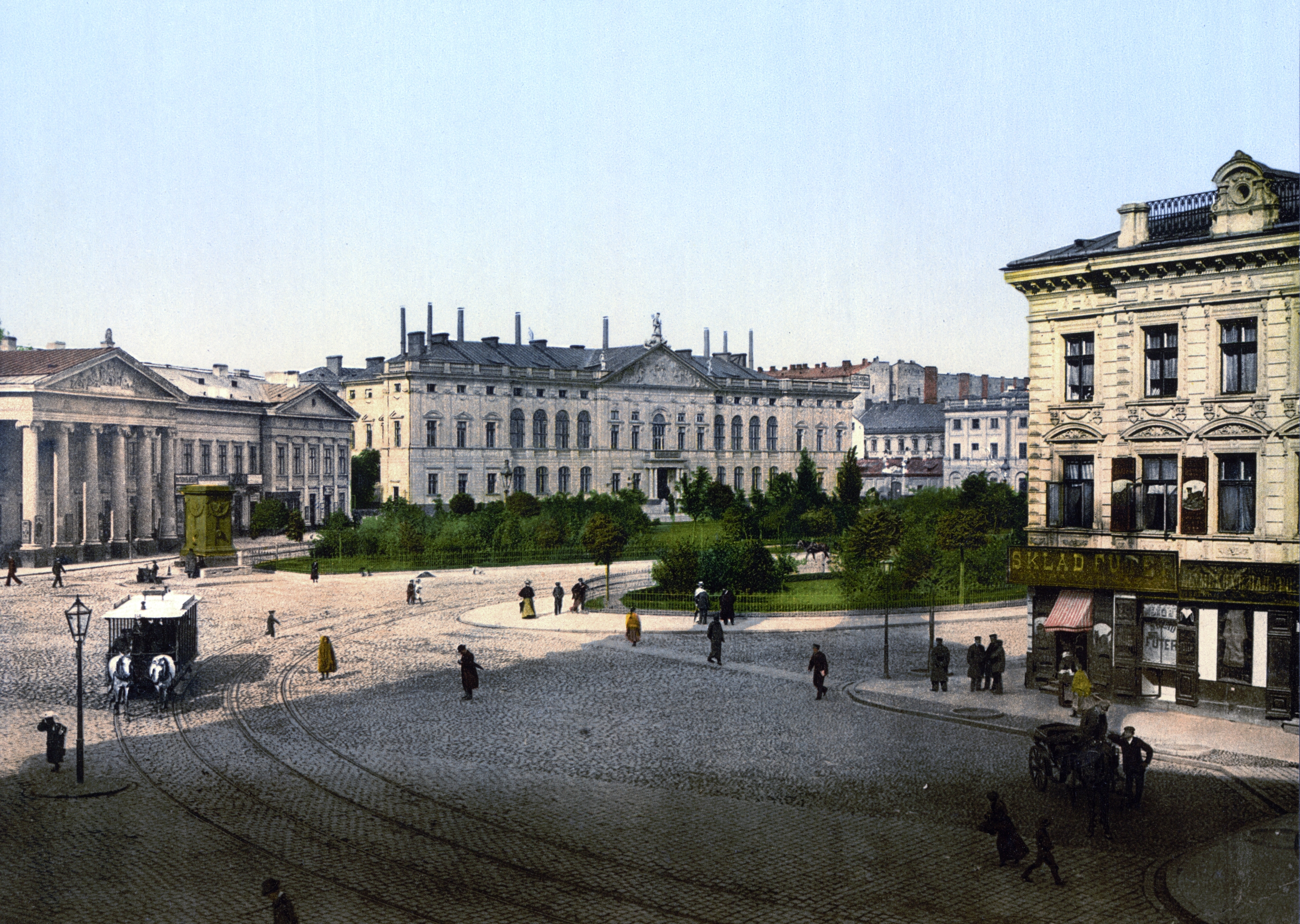
Krasinski Square, 1890s

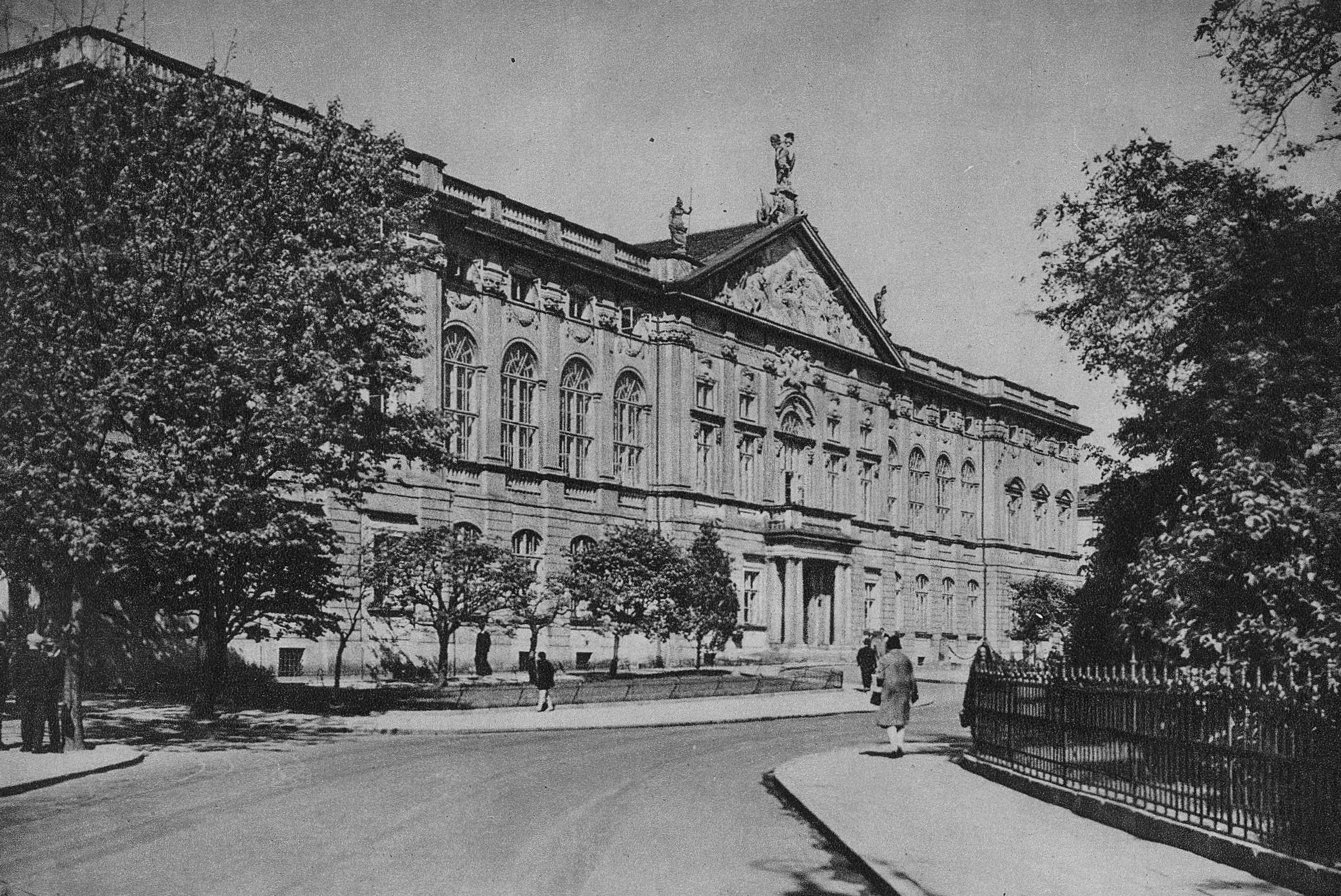
The Palace in 1939

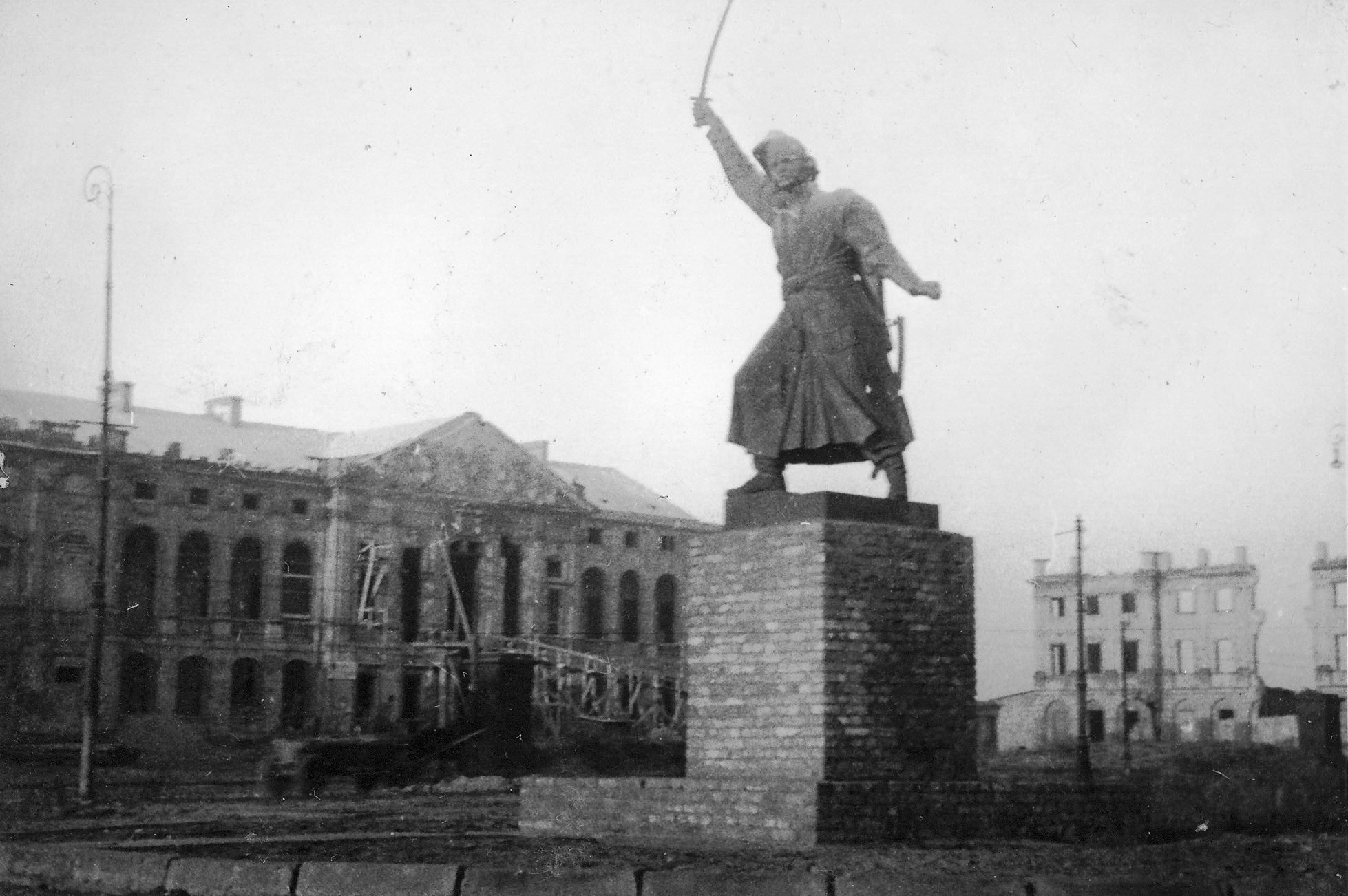
Soon after World War II

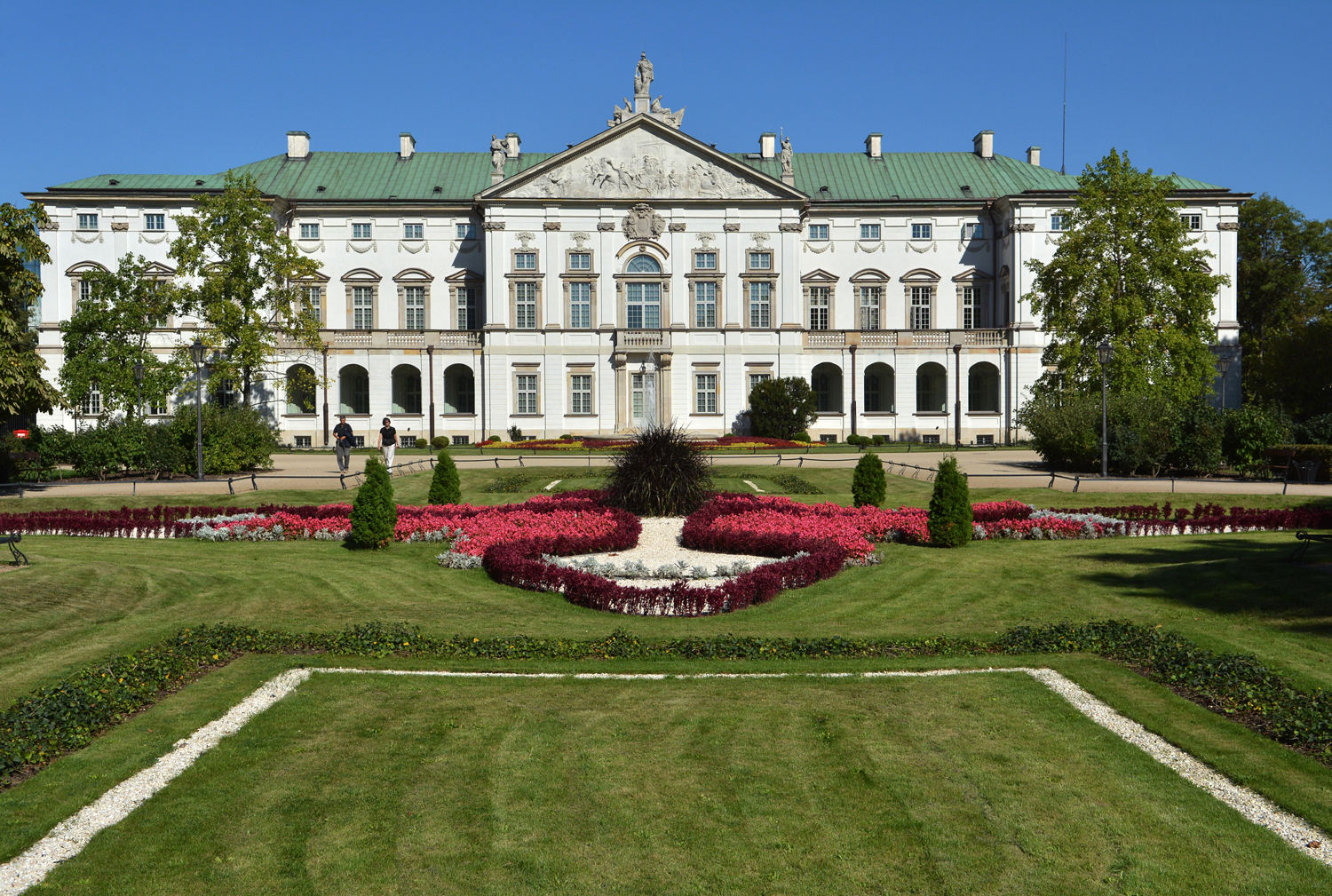
Garden façade

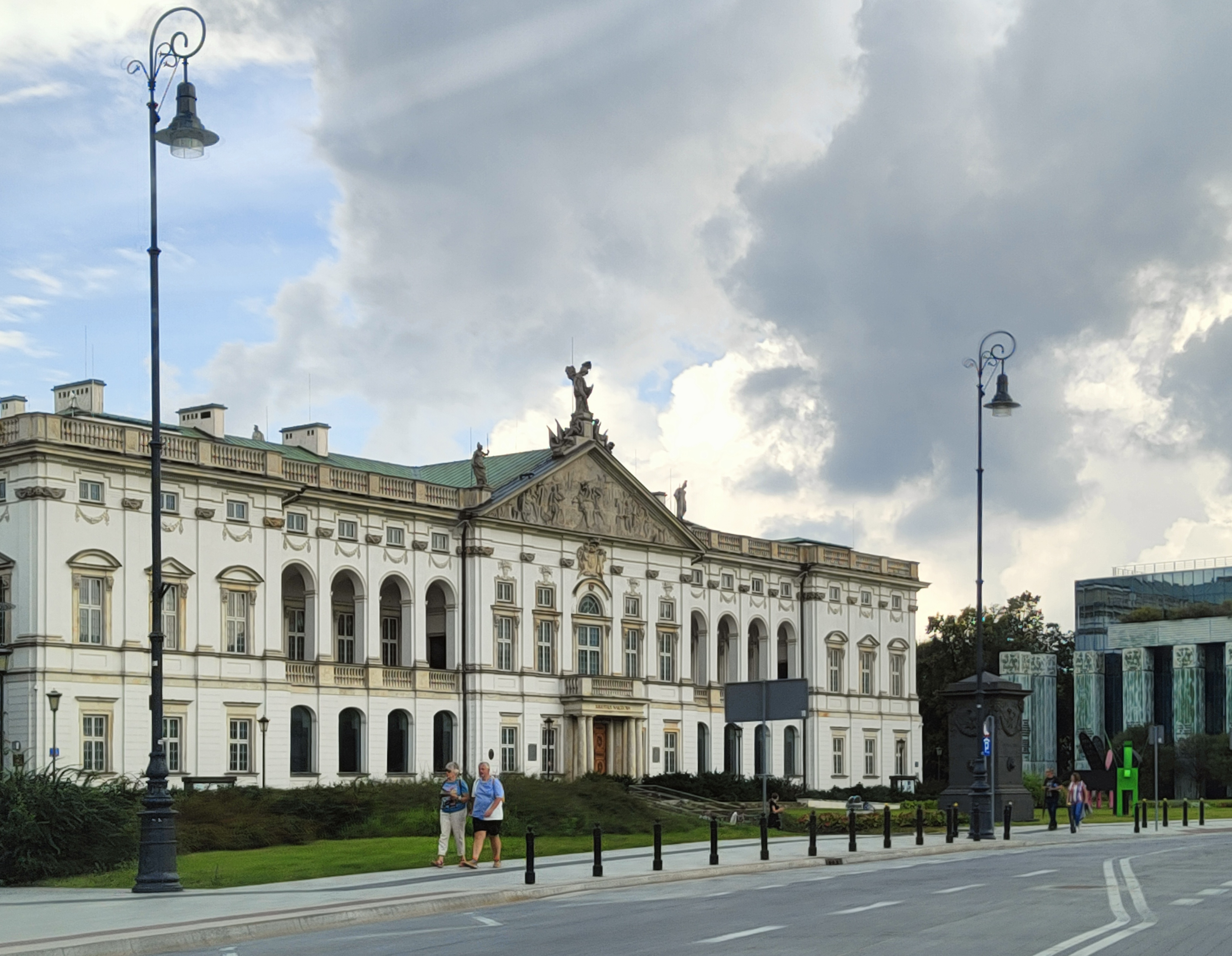
Krasiński Palace next to the Supreme Court of Poland

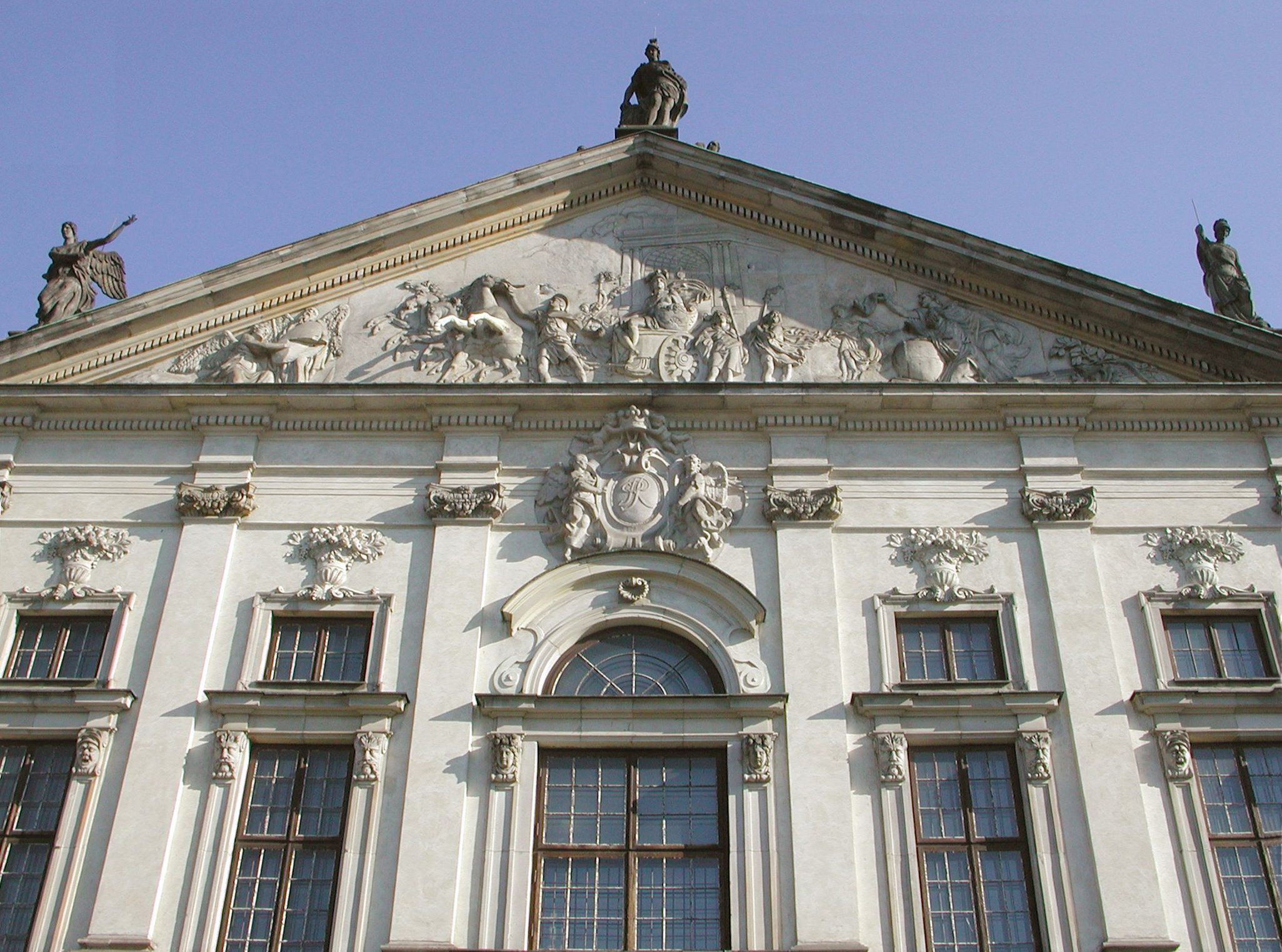
Pediment: Triumph of Marcus Valerius Corvinus by Andreas Schlüter

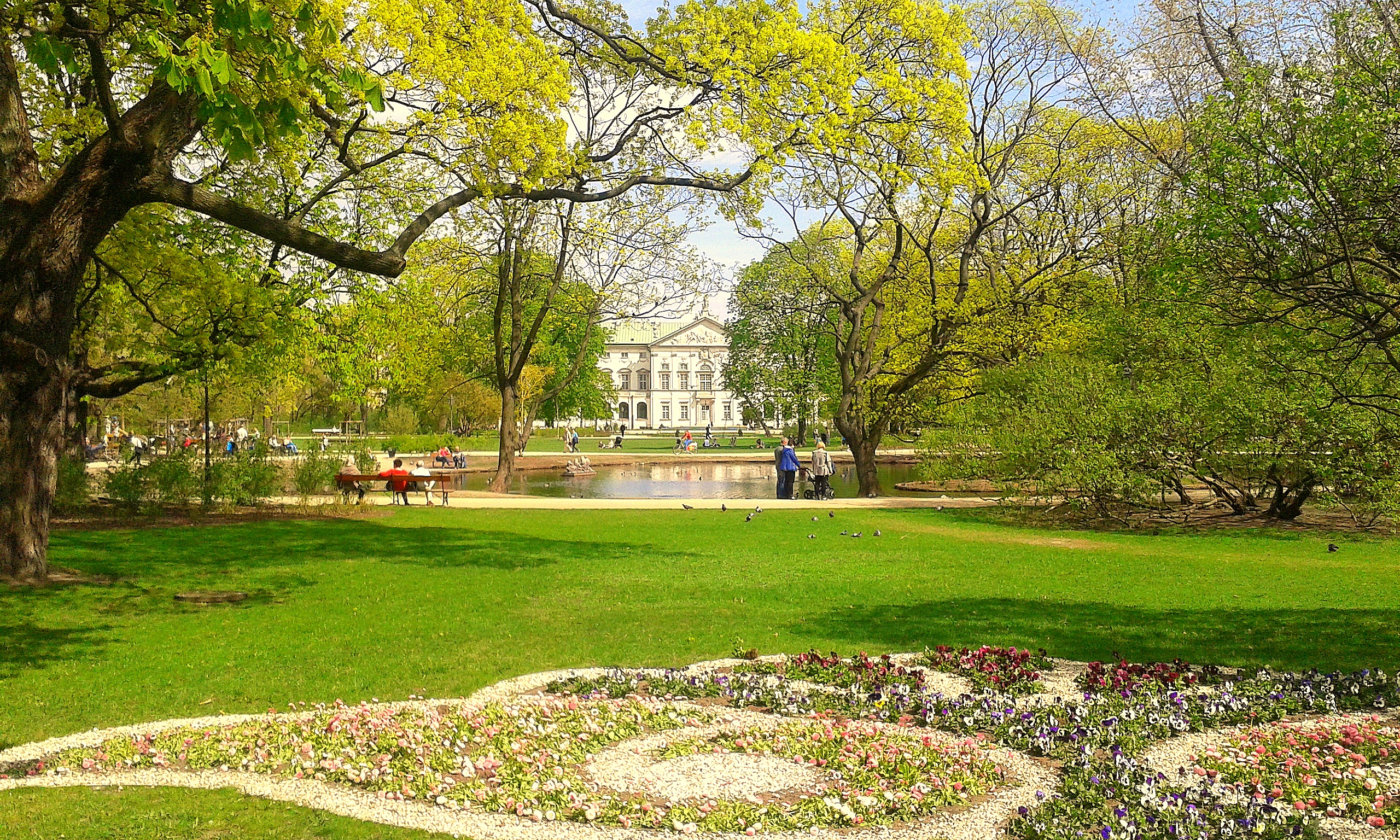
Krasiński Garden

== See also ==
- List of palaces in Poland
- Field Cathedral of the Polish Army
- Załuski Library
- Czapski Palace - Warsaw's other palace that is sometimes called "Krasiński Palace"
