= Jan Dobrogost Krasiński =

Polish noble (1639–1717)

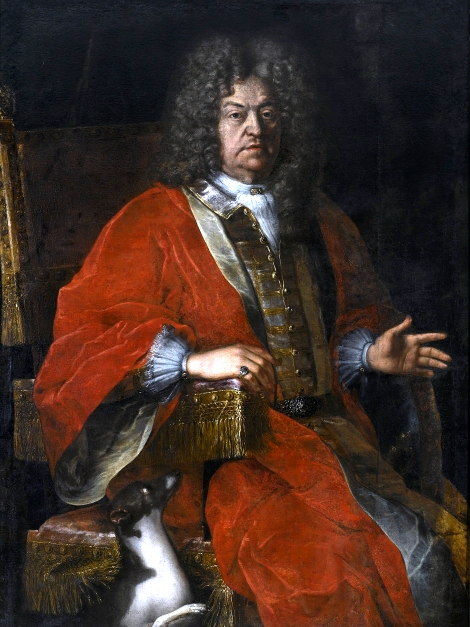
- Coat of arms: Ślepowron
- Born: 10 June 1639
- Died: 21 February 1717 (aged 77)
- Family: Krasiński
- Consort: Teresa Chodkiewicz; Teresa Jadwiga Jabłonowska
- Issue: with Teresa Chodkiewicz; Stanisław Bonifacy Krasiński
- Father: Jan Kazimierz Krasiński
- Mother: Urszula Grzybowska

Jan Dobrogost Bonawentura Krasiński (English: John Krasinski; 10 June 1639 – 21 February 1717) was a Polish nobleman (szlachcic).

== Biography ==
He was the son of Jan Kazimierz Krasiński and Ursula Grzybowska. In his youth he studied in the Netherlands and France. Jan became a Royal Colonel (pułkownik królewski) in 1665, and became Recorder of the Crown and voivode of Płock Voivodeship in 1688. He was also starost of Łomża, Warsaw, Nowe Miasto Korczyn, Przasnysz, Sztum, and Opinogóra Górna.

In 1673, he took part in the victorious Battle of Khotyn. Linked with the court of John III Sobieski, he was an ally, adviser and a friend of the king. He participated in the Battle of Vienna in 1683 commanding a winged hussars squadron.

He became an elector at the court of King Augustus II the Strong in 1697.

Krasiński was a great patron of the arts and founder of many art galleries in the Polish–Lithuanian Commonwealth. Between 1682 and 1695 he ordered to build a magnificent palace in Warsaw, known today as the Palace of the Commonwealth.

He was buried in Węgrów.
