= Ludwik Krasiński =

Polish royal courtier

Ludwik Krasiński of Ślepowron (1609 in Ciechanów, Polish–Lithuanian Commonwealth – 1644) was a Polish royal courtier, the castellan of Ciechanów and, in 1637, the starosta of Płock.

Ludwik was the son of Stanisław Krasiński and brother of Gabriel Krasiński and Jan Kazimierz Krasiński.

He was the elector of Władysław IV of Płock Voivodeship in 1632. Ludwik was a member of parliament of Płock Voivodeship from its coronation in 1633 to 1637.
