= Jan Kazimierz Krasiński =

Polish nobleman (1607–1669)

- Coat of arms: Ślepowron
- Born: 1607; Ciechanów
- Died: 1669 (aged 61–62)
- Family: Krasiński
- Consort: Urszula Grzybowska; Amata Andrault de Langeron
- Issue: with Urszula Grzybowska; Jan Dobrogost Krasiński; Joanna Maria Krasińska
- Father: Stanisław Krasiński
- Mother: Anna Michowska

Jan Kazimierz Krasiński (1607–1669) was a Polish nobleman (szlachcic) using the Ślepowron coat of arms.

He was the fifth son of Stanisław Krasinski and Anna Michowska, brother of Gabriel and Ludwik.

Jan Kazimierz was courtier on the royal court. He was podkomorzy of Ciechanów since 1634, castellan of Ciechanów since 1637 and of Warsaw since 1648, voivode of Płock Voivodeship since 1650, Grand Treasurer of the Crown from 1658 to 1669, Royal Colonel since 1661, Starost of Łomża, Nowe Miasto Korczyn, Grabów, Przasnysz and Parczew.

He fought in 1653 on the Dniester near Kamieniec Podolski - near Zwaniec, where Polish troops led by Jan Kazimierz were surrounded by Cossacks and Tatars, but withstood the siege of the camp. During the Swedish Deluge, on 30 September 1655, he fought with the Swedes near Modlin, at the head of 15,000 Masovian cavalry and field infantry.

He was twice appointed chief commissioner for treaties with Russia, first on 22 May 1656, then again on 25 July 1658. In 1658, he became the Treasurer of the Crown Prince, throughout his term, coins with the coat of arms of Krasiński Ślepowron were minted.

He is buried in Krasne, where he has a baroque tombstone, erected by his son Jan Dobrogost, in the presbytery of the church, opposite the tombstone he left for his wives.
