= Ania Ahlborn =

Polish American horror novelist

- Born: Ciechanów, Poland
- Education: University of New Mexico (BA)
- Known for: Horror novels
- Website: aniaahlborn.com

Ania Ahlborn is a Polish American horror novelist whose self-published debut novel Seed reached #1 on Amazon's list of best-selling horror novels in 2011. She is the author of several novels, novellas and short stories in the horror genre.

== Biography ==
Ahlborn was born in Ciechanów, Poland. She earned a degree in English from the University of New Mexico.

== Writing career ==
She writes horror thrillers and self-published before she got representation. Ahlborn is now published through Simon and Schuster. Her novels were nominated for a This is Horror "Novel of the Year" award in 2015 and 2017 for Brother and The Devil Crept In, respectively. Her books have been translated into German.

Rights to adapt her first novel were optioned by Amazon Studios in 2012, but an adaptation has not been released.

== Bibliography ==
=== Novels ===
- Seed (2012)
- The Neighbors (2012)
- The Shuddering (2013)
- The Bird Eater (2014)
- Within These Walls (2015)
- Brother (2015)
- The Devil Crept In (2017)
- If You See Her (2019)
- Dark Across the Bay (2021)
- Good And Joyful Things (2024)
- The Unseen (2025)

=== Novellas ===
- The Pretty Ones (2015)
- I Call Upon Thee (2017)
- Palmetto (2021)

=== Short stories ===
- "The Governess" (2019) (in the anthology Other Voices, Other Tombs)
- "The Debt" (2019) (in the anthology Hex Life: Wicked New Tales of Witchery)

=== Omnibus ===
- Apart in the Dark (2018) (includes The Pretty Ones and I Call Upon Thee)
