= Stanisław Krasiński (1585–1649) =

Polish-Lithuanian nobleman and politician

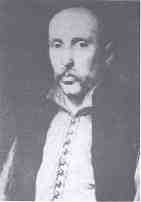

Stanislaw Krasiński (c. 1585–1649) was a Polish-Lithuanian nobleman (szlachcic) and politician.

He was a known jurist: judge of the Ciechanów Land from 1627, konfederacja judge during the interregnum of 1632; elected twice a deputy judge of the Treasury Tribinal in Radom, in 1633, elected as the Commissioner for the Sejm Boundary Commission in Masovia and also the same year, Chief Justice of the Crown Tribunal of Piotrków.

Krasiński was Deputy to Sejm in the years 1634, 1635 and 1638, as well as participant of the coronation sejms of 1633 and 1649. He was marshal of the Sejmik of Masovia in 1633 and 1635.

Krasiński was appointed to the Senate of Poland in 1641.

In 1622, he was given the title of wojski of Różan; in 1637, the title of podkomorzy of Ciechanów and in 1641 he was given the title of castellan of Sierpc.
