= Kazimierz Krasiński =

Polish noble, politician and patron of art

- Count
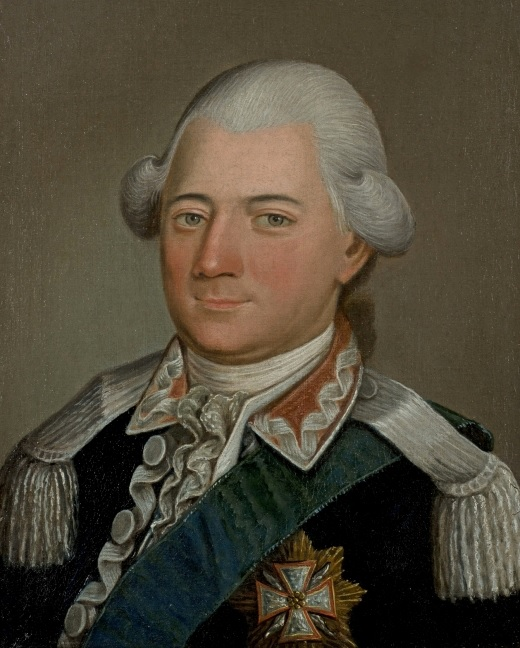
- Coat of arms: Ślepowron
- Born: 1725
- Died: 25 September 1802
- Family: Krasiński
- Consort: Eustachia Potocka; Elżbieta Potocka; Anna Ossolińska
- Issue: with Anna Ossolińska; Jan Wawrzyniec Krasiński; Elźbieta Krasińska
- Father: Antoni Krasiński
- Mother: Barbara Zielińska

Count Kazimierz Krasiński (1725–1802) was a Polish noble, politician and patron of art. He was the son of Antoni Krasiński and Barbara Zielińska.

The last Grand Camp Leader of the Crown (since 1763) of the Polish–Lithuanian Commonwealth. He was Chamberlain of King Stanisław Leszczyński and starost of Krasnystaw and Nowe Miasto Korczyn.

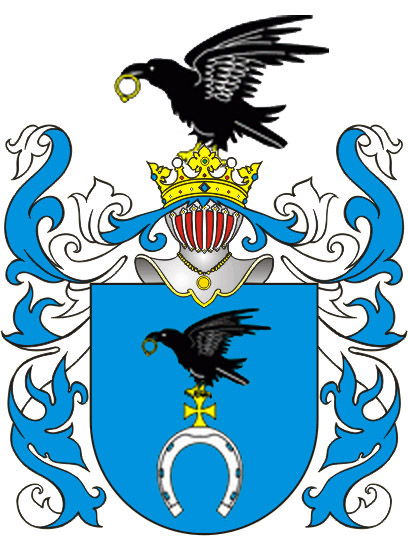
Ślepowron Coat of Arms

In the youth he stayed on the court of King Louis XV and then educated on the Military Cadet School of Stanisław Leszczyński in Lunéville.

He was Marshal of the Sejm (ordinary) from 30 September to 9 November 1782 in Warsaw.

During the Four-Year Sejm in 1788, he was a member of the Military Commission of the Commonwealth and a supporter of the 3rd May Constitution.

He financed and participated in the Kościuszko Uprising in 1794. After the Partitions of Poland, he patronized Polish independence organisations and financed scientific publications and printing of books.

He was also a benefactor of the church.

== Awards ==
- Knight of the Order of the White Eagle, awarded in 1763.
