= Krasiński family =

Polish noble family

Krasiński
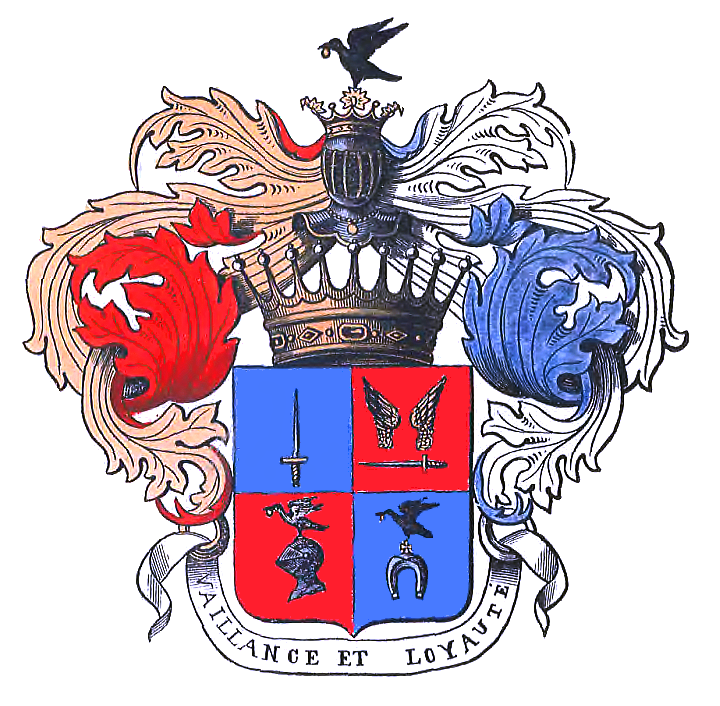
- Coat of arms of the Counts Krasiński
- Current region: Poland
- Origin: Krasne, Masovian Voivodeship, Poland

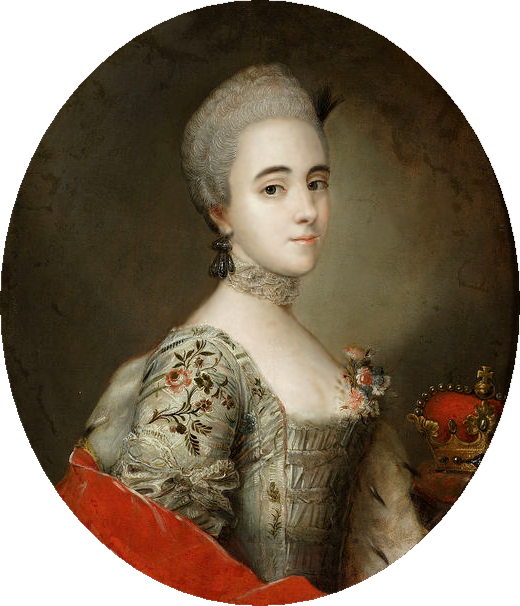
Franciszka Krasińska

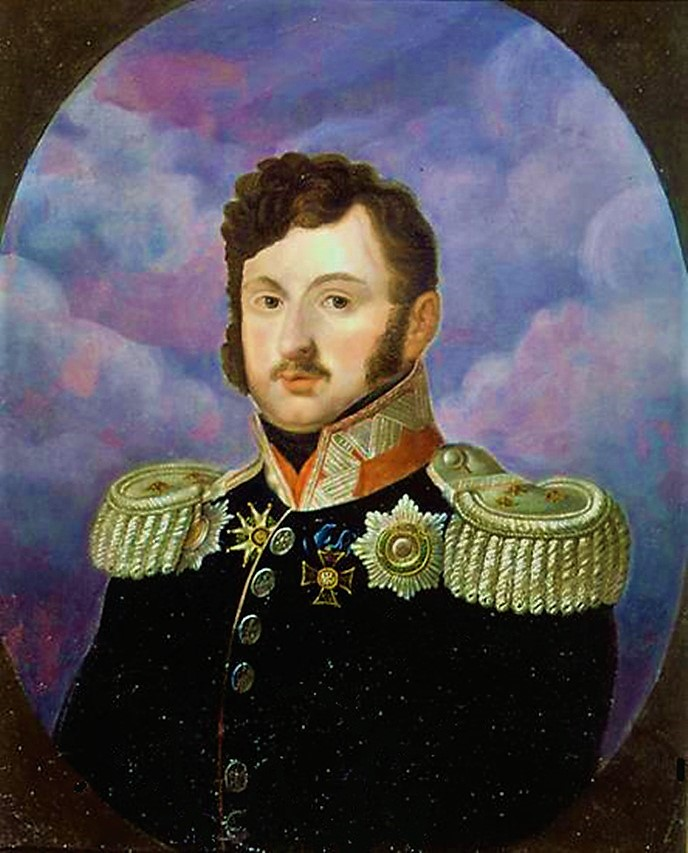
Wincenty Krasiński

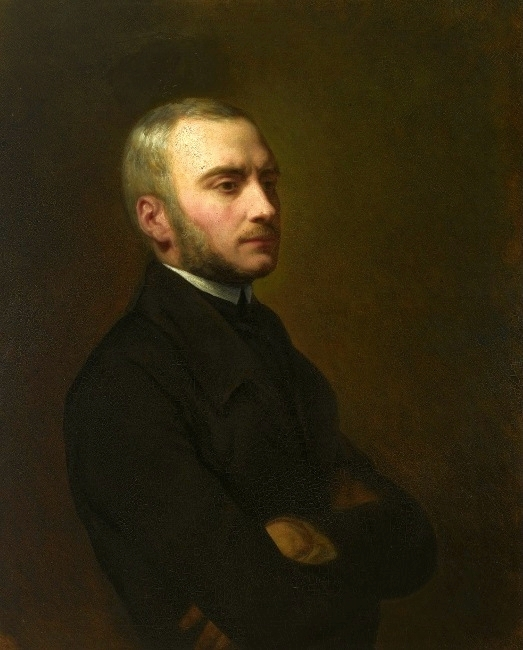
Zygmunt Krasiński, one of Poland's Three National Bards.

The House of Krasiński (plural: Krasińscy) is an old Polish noble family, whose members held the title of Count in the Austro-Hungarian Empire, granted to them on 29 June 1856 by Franz Joseph I. The name is derived from the village of Krasne in Masovia. The family traces its origins to the 14th century. Its members have been landowners and politically active in Masovia, Lithuania, and Galicia, now in Poland. The Krasiński family has produced officers, politicians (including voivodes of Poland and members of the Senate of Poland), and bishops. One of the most renowned members of the Krasiński family is the 19th-century poet Zygmunt Krasiński, one of Poland's Three Bards.

== Origins ==
Wratislaw Corvin is a figure in Hungarian history, recognized for his ancestral lineage. The family's Polish heritage can be traced back to Slawek Korwin (1412–1427), who established ownership of Krasne and founded the village of "Wold Krasińska" in 1460. Slawek Korwin's grandson, Jan Korwin Krasiński, is the common ancestor of two distinct branches: the Krasne Krasiński line, which became extinct in the 20th century, and the current Korwin Krasiński line, established by his son Andrea (born in 1588). The latter branch is further divided into multiple lines, with the eldest descending from Gabriel and ending with Stanisław Korwin Krasiński. Stanisław, along with his partner Salomea Trzcińska, had four daughters, including Franciszka Korwin-Krasińska, who became the wife of Charles of Saxony, Duke of Courland, the son of King Augustus III of Poland.

== History ==
Coat of arms of Hubert Antoni Krasiński, 1882

Wincenty Krasiński received confirmation of the coat of arms (with the removal of Napoleonic heraldic features) in the Kingdom of Poland on May 17, 1837 (or 1811 by Napoleon I).

The Ukrainian line, which used the Ślepowron coat of arms, can be traced back to Andrzej Krasiński, who died in Bukovina in 1497. This line continues today with descendants in England and Canada, including Stanisław Krasiński, Jan Kazimierz Krasiński, Franciszka Korwin-Krasińska, Wincenty Krasiński, Zygmunt Krasiński, Władysław Krasiński, and others.

Hubert Antoni Krasiński received confirmation of the count's title along with the four-field coat of arms on September 18, 1882, in Galicia.

=== Mszana Dolna ===
Having lost property during World War I in Regimentarzówka (Dibrivka in modern-day Ukraine), Count Henryk Piotr Krasiński (29 April 1866 - 20 September 1928) of the Ukrainian Krasinskis settled with his wife Maria Łęcki in Mszana Dolna on a small estate that was part of Maria Łęcki's dowry, purchased on 16 January 1899. They lived in a manor house styled as an English "cottage" called Folwark (Grange) or Dwór Rodziny Krasińskich (Krasiński Family Manor/Mansion), built at the end of the 19th century. Taken from the family in 1945 by the communist government, it is now a Youth Educational Center with a family park and playground named after the Krasiński family: Park Miejski im. Rodziny Krasińskich (Krasiński Family City Park). On its grounds is the old winery, which was converted in 2003 into a hotel restaurant called Folwark Stara Winiarnia (The Old Grange Winery). Their daughter, Countess Maria Krasińska, was the last owner of the estate until 1945.

Henryk's son Marian ran several family businesses, including leasing the sawmill next to the house to a Jewish family, the Feurersteins, as well as building an Olympic-size swimming pool and teaching mathematics at the Mszana high school until 1945, when the communist government seized the property.

The town cemetery has a Krasiński family section where Henryk, his wife Maria Łęcka, daughter Franciszka Maria Krasińska (1901–1920), and sons Marian (1909–1965) and Henryk (1902–1979) are all buried.

=== World War II ===
Members of the Ukrainian line were forced to flee Poland at the start of World War II. Count Hubert, son of Count Henryk, fled Warsaw with his wife Irena and their infant son Andrew. They traveled to France via Romania and Italy. As a major in the Polish Air Force, Hubert made his way to England to join the free Polish RAF, and was posted for a time to Sealand.

Count Józef Krasiński (pilot), the seventh and youngest child of Henryk Piotr Krasiński, also escaped to France and Great Britain. In 1941, he became a pilot with the 301 Squadron, and was formally assigned to Hemswell air base. He became a captain in the Polish Air Force and a Flight Lieutenant in the RAF.

Members of the Mszana Dolna Krasińskis who remained during the war included Marian, Maria Antonia, and their mother Maria. Zofia Blitz and her mother stayed at the Krasiński manor house after relocating from Warsaw following the Warsaw Uprising until the end of the war.

== Notable members ==
(In chronological order of year of birth)

- Stanisław Krasiński (1558–1617), castellan, voivode
- Stanisław Krasiński (1585–1649), jurist, member of parliament
- Jan Kazimierz Krasiński (1607–1669), voivode
- Ludwik Krasiński (1609–1644), military commander
- Jan Dobrogost Krasiński (1639–1717), politician
- Zofia Krasińska (died 1642 or 1643), muse
- Michał Hieronim Krasiński (1712–1784), politician
- Adam Stanisław Krasiński (1714–1800), bishop
- Kazimierz Krasiński (1725–1802), politician, military leader, member of the Great Sejm, patron of the arts
- Zofia Lubomirska (1718–1790), landowner, publicist, philanthropist, and entrepreneur, married to Antoni Lubomirski
- Franciszka Korwin-Krasińska (1742–1796), wife of Charles of Saxony, Duke of Courland
- Jan Krasiński (1756–1790), military commander
- Wincenty Krasiński (1782–1858), military leader, senator, father of the poet Zygmunt Krasiński
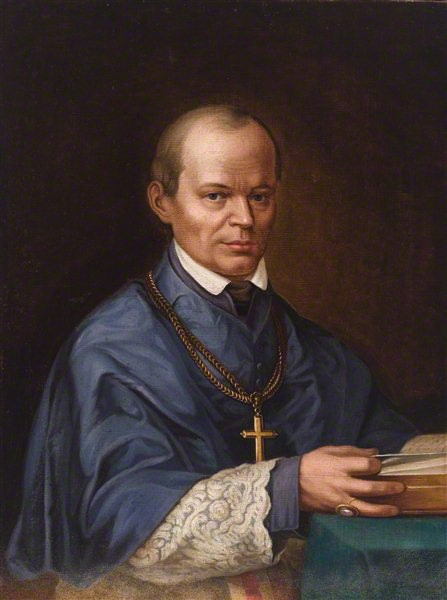
- Bishop Adam Stanisław Krasiński
  Adam Stanisław Krasiński (1810–1891), Bishop of Vilnius
- Zygmunt Krasiński (1812–1859), poet
- Count Henryk Hubert Antoni (Humbert) Krasiński (1833–1890), bacteriologist who worked with Louis Pasteur in Paris. Designed Warsaw sewage systems. Part of a Polish delegation that submitted demands to Emperor Franz Joseph I. Awarded the Italian Order of St. Maurice & St. Lazarus and the French Legion of Honor
- Władysław Krasiński (1844–1873), son of the poet Zygmunt Krasiński
- Marya Krasińska (1850-1884), candidate as wife of Carl XV, King of Sweden and Norway
- Józef Krasiński (15 June 1914, Mszana Dolna – 3 April 1998, Canmore, Alberta, Canada), Polish engineer, aviator, and count. Military aviator, pilot of the 301 Bomber Squadron during World War II, decorated with the Distinguished Flying Cross and the Silver Cross of the Order of Virtuti Militari, aviation engineer, and lecturer at universities in Argentina and Canada.

== Coat of arms ==
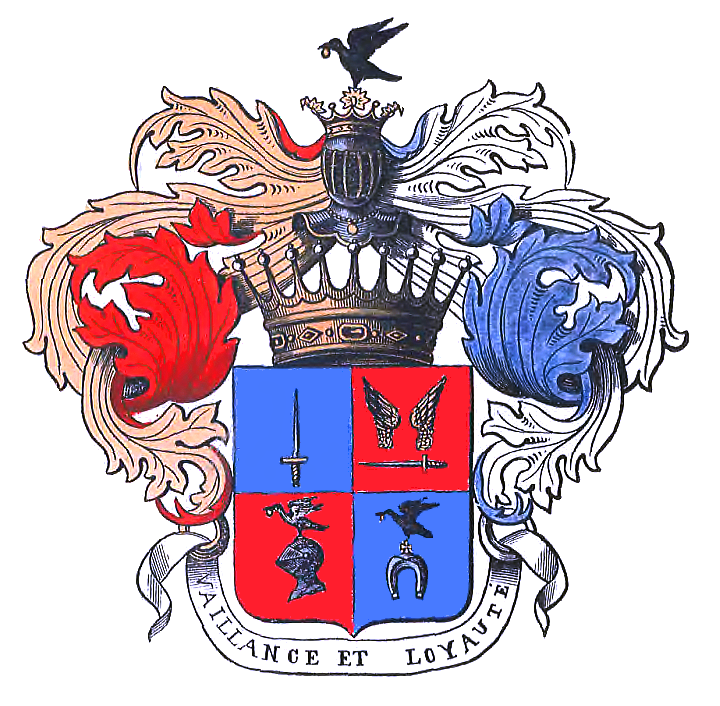
Krasiński II Hrabia coat of arms, a variant of the Ślepowron coat of arms

Ślepowron coat of arms

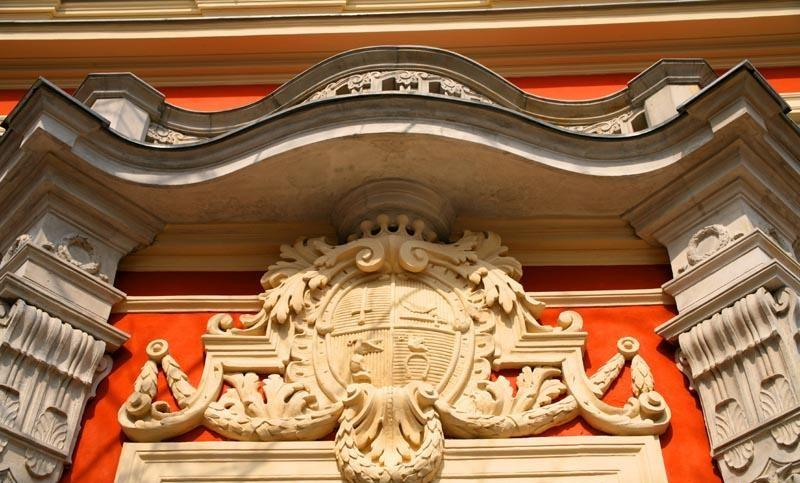
Coat of Arms of the House of Krasiński at the Czapski Palace

== Residences ==
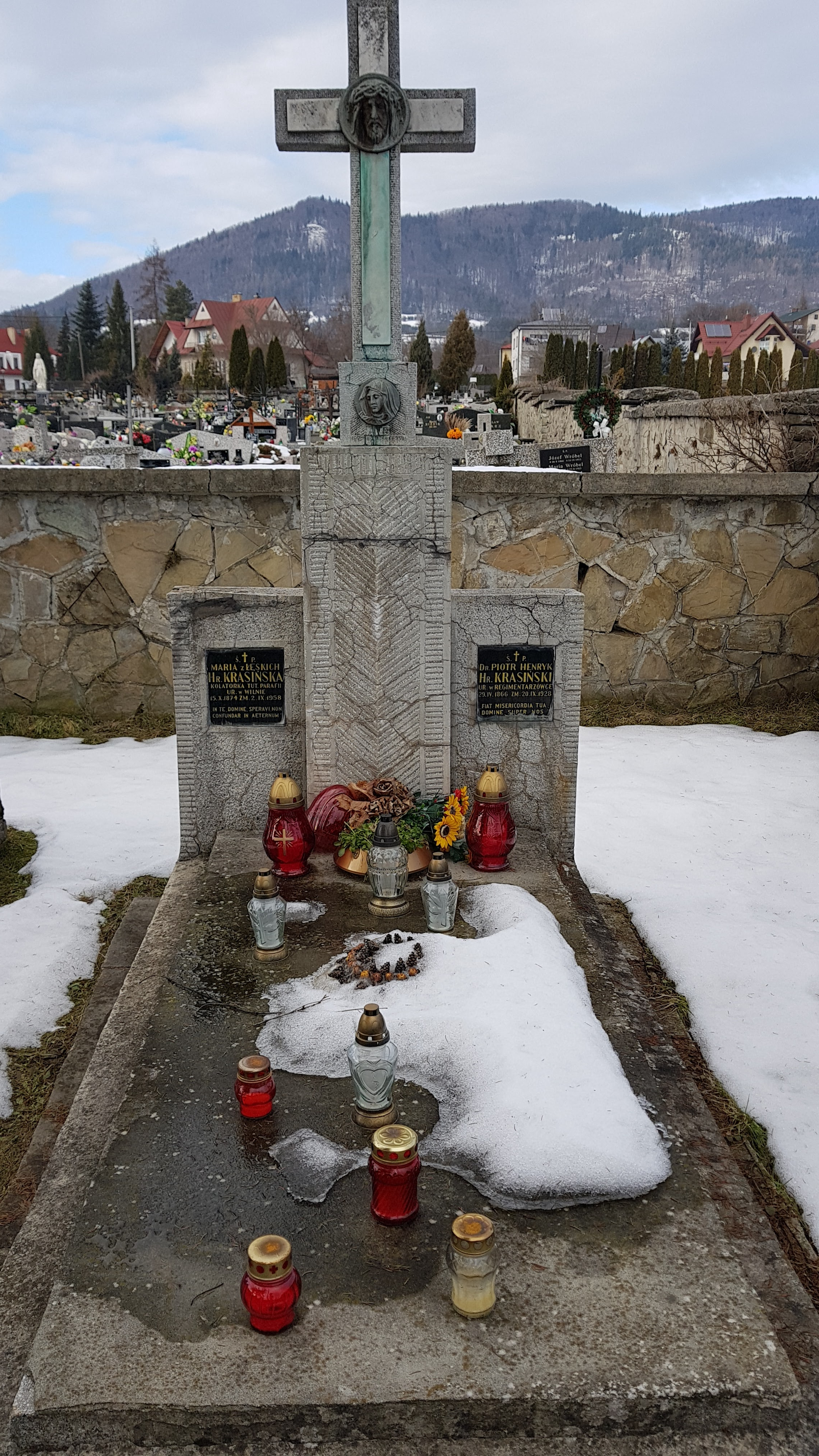
Count Henryk Piotr Zygmunt Krasiński and Maria Stanisława Gertruda Łęska's gravestones, Mszana Dolna

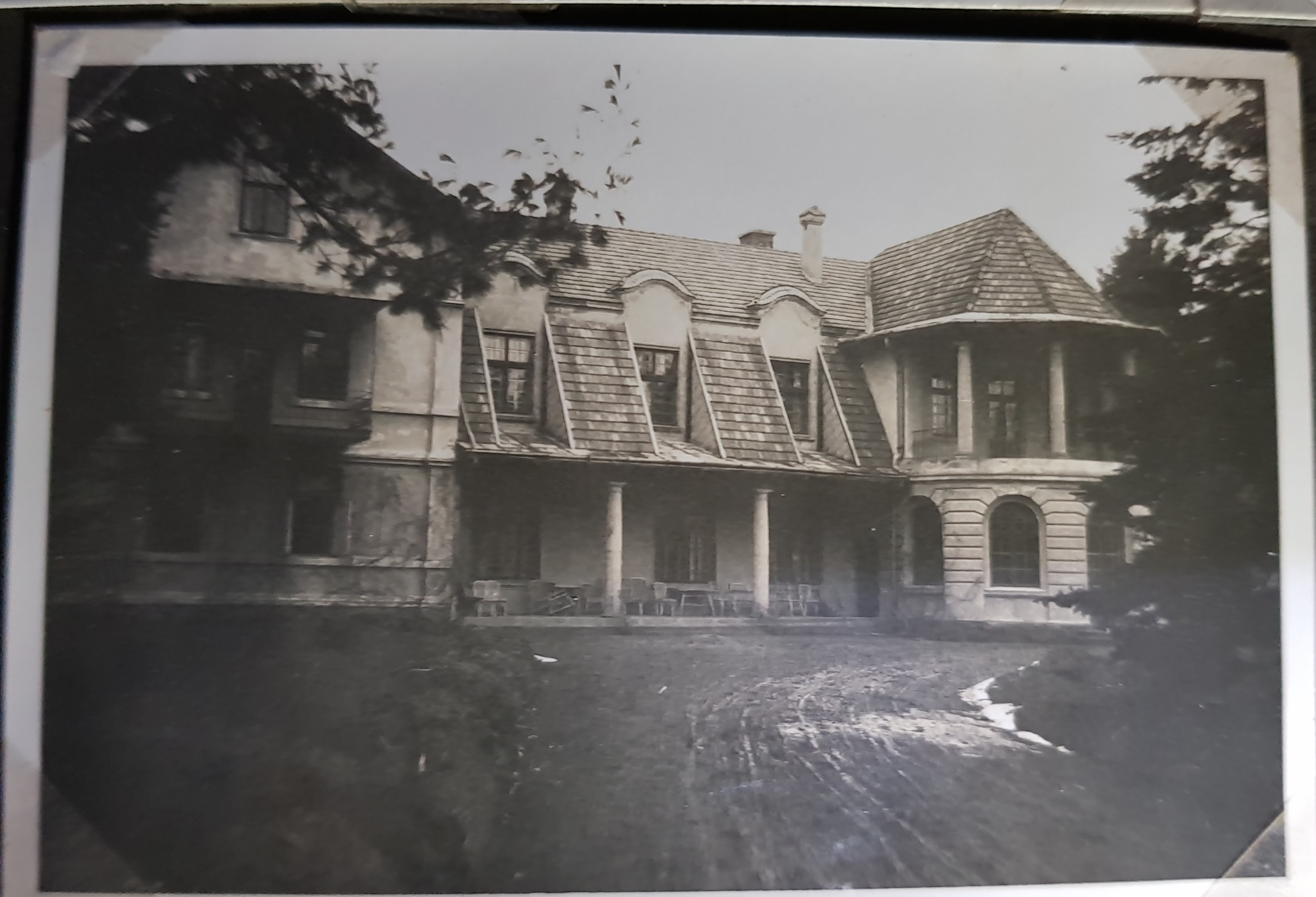
Krasinski Family Manor (Dwór Rodziny Krasińskich), Mszana Dolna

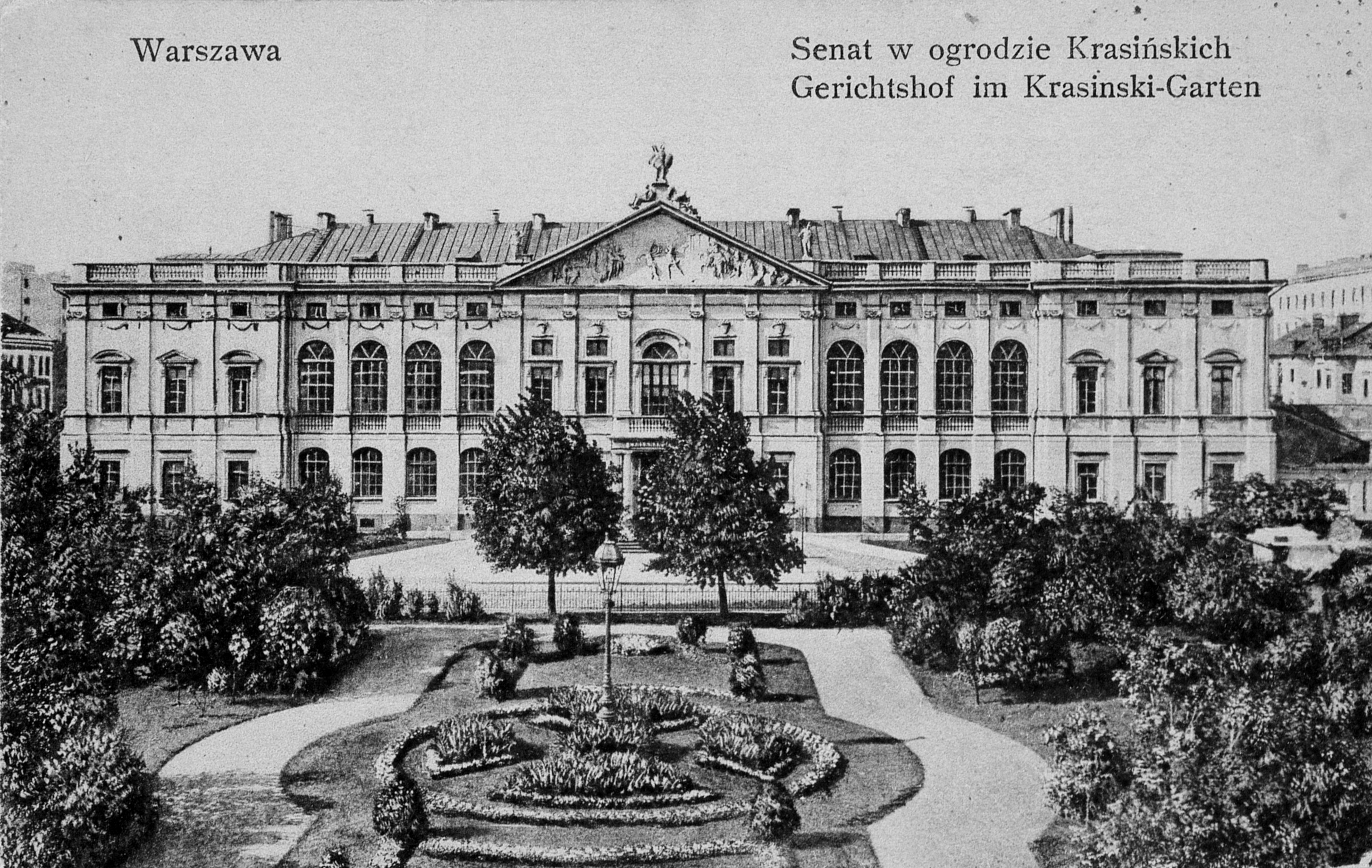
Krasiński Palace, Warsaw

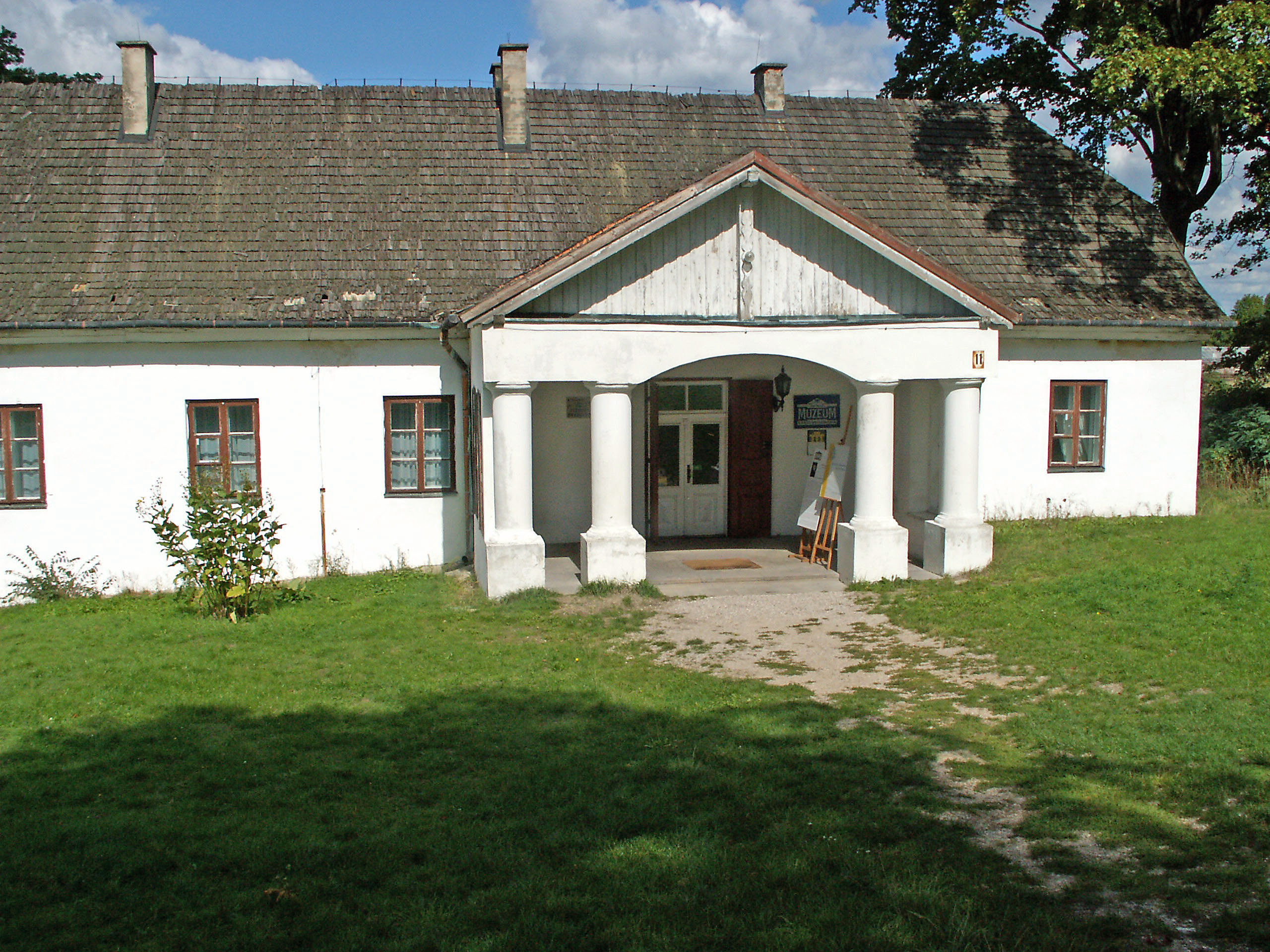
Krasiński Manor in Złoty Potok (Zygmunt Krasinski Museum)

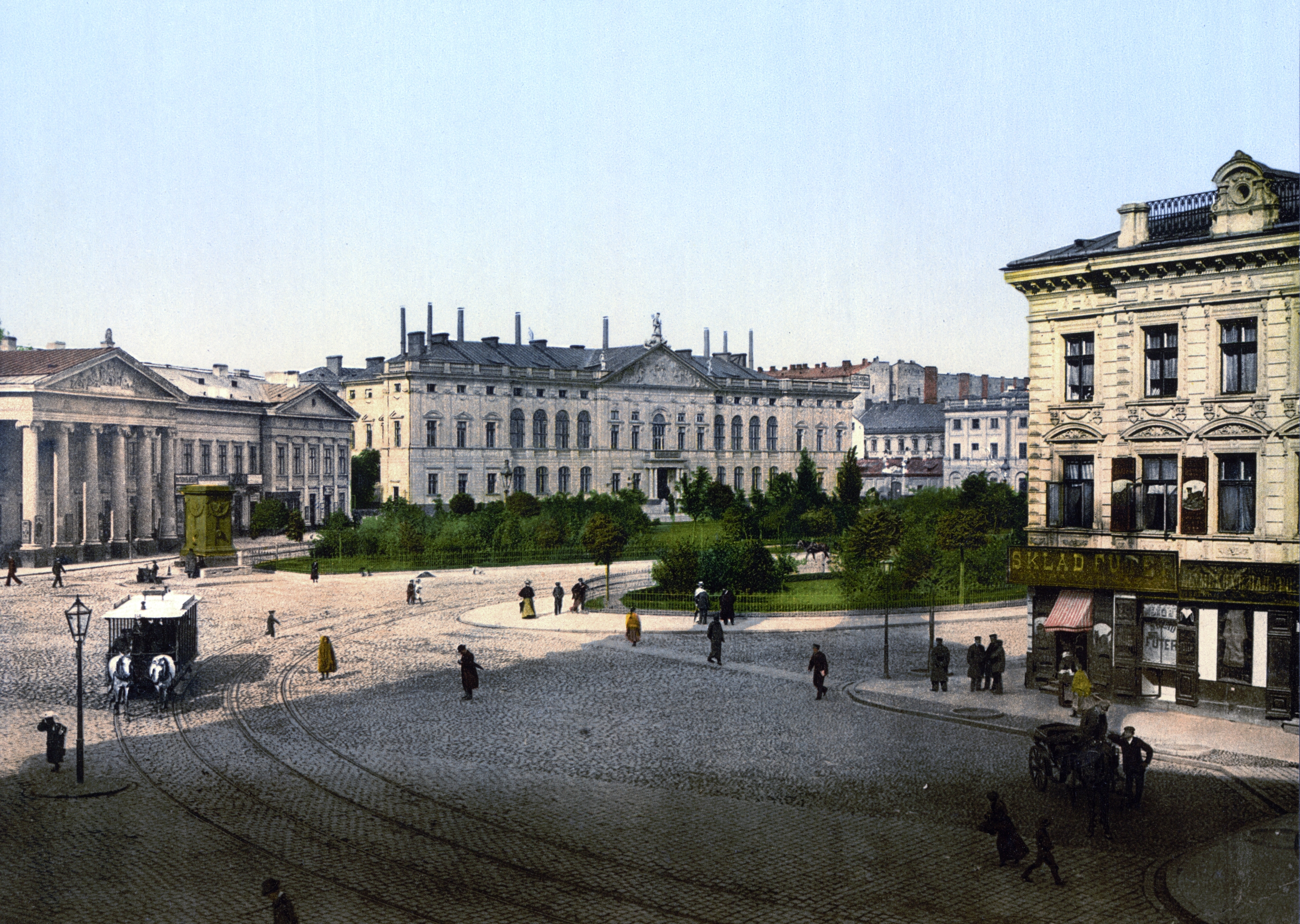
Krasinski Palace and Square, Warsaw

== See also ==
- Krasiński Square
- Three Bards

== Bibliography ==
- A. Boniecki, Herbarz polski, Warszawa 1908, t. XII.
- K. Niesiecki, Herbarz polski, Lipsk 1840, t. V.
