= Ciechanów =

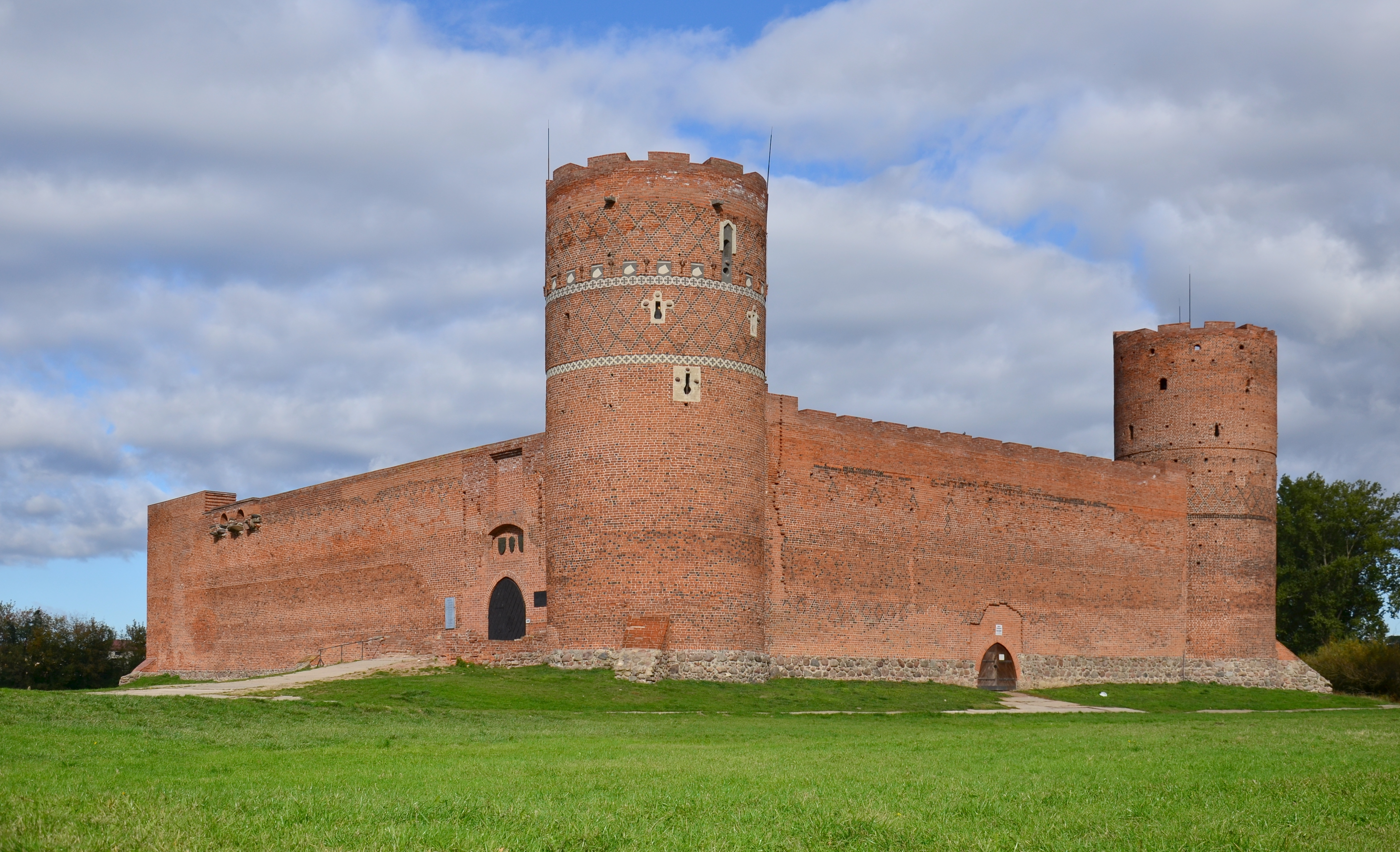
- Ciechanów Castle

- Flag Coat of arms

- Location within Poland
- Coordinates: 52°52′N 20°38′E
- Country: Poland
- Voivodeship: Masovian
- County: Ciechanów
- Gmina: Ciechanów (urban gmina)
- First mentioned: 1065
- City rights: 1400

Government
  - City mayor: Krzysztof Kosiński (PSL)

Area
  - Total: 32.51 km^{2} (12.55 sq mi)
- Highest elevation: 151 m (495 ft)
- Lowest elevation: 116 m (381 ft)

Population (31 December 2021)
  - Total: 43,495
  - Density: 1,338/km^{2} (3,465/sq mi)
- Time zone: UTC+1 (CET)
  - Summer (DST): UTC+2 (CEST)
- Postal code: 06-400 to 06-413
- Area code: +48 023
- Car plates: WCI
- Website: www.umciechanow.pl

Ciechanów (Polish pronunciation: [t͡ɕeˈxanuf]) is a city in north-central Poland, seat of the Ciechanów County in the Masovian Voivodeship. As of December 2021, it has a population of 43,495.

A city with almost a thousand years of history, recorded in 1065, Ciechanów is one of the oldest and largest cities of northern Mazovia, particularly known for its medieval castle, brewery, founded in the 18th century, and the science park with the unique hyperboloid water tower. The city has experienced several foreign invasions and was the site of the publication of Poland's pioneering honey harvesting law in 1559. From 1975 to 1998, it was the capital of the Ciechanów Voivodeship.

== History ==
The settlement is first mentioned in a 1065 document by Bolesław II the Bold handing the land over to the church. The medieval gord in Ciechanów numbered approximately 3,000 armed men, and together with the region of Mazovia, it became part of the emerging Polish state in the late 10th century.

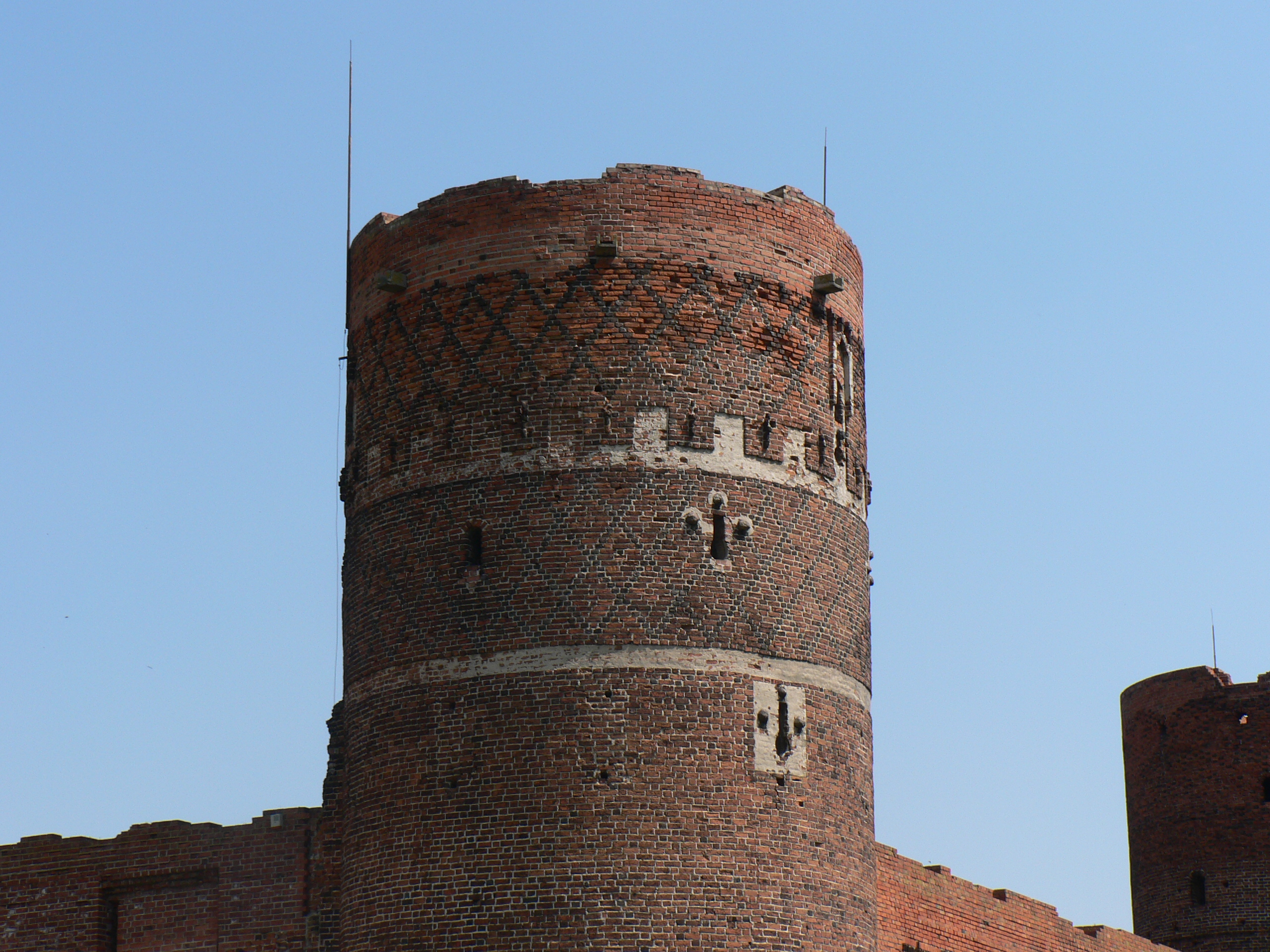
Castle tower

In 1254, Ciechanów is mentioned as the seat of a castellany (Rethiborius Castellanus de Techanow (Racibor, Kasztelan Ciechanowa)). In 1400 Janusz I of Czersk granted Ciechanów town privileges. The area eventually become a separate duchy with Casimir I of Warsaw using the title "dominus et heres lub dominus et princeps Ciechanoviensis". In the Middle Ages, the defensive gord of Ciechanów protected northern Mazovia from raids of Lithuanians, Yotvingians, Old Prussians and later, the Teutonic Knights. It is not known when it was granted a town charter. This must have happened before 1475, as a document from that year, issued by Duke Janusz II of Warsaw, states that Ciechanów has a Chełmno town charter.

In the period between the 14th and 16th centuries, Ciechanów prospered with the population reaching 5,000. In the late 14th century, Siemowit III, Duke of Masovia, began construction of a castle, while his son Janusz I of Warsaw invited the Augustinians, who in the mid-15th century began construction of a church and an abbey. The Augustinian Friars were brought to Ciechanów in 1358 by Duke Siemowit III. They experienced the most turbulent times during the Reformation. From the 17th century, the Augustinians’ pastoral presence was growing in the towns. The monastery – characterised by mild observance – was usually inhabited by four to seven monks.

In 1526, together with all Mazovia, Ciechanów was incorporated directly to the Kingdom of Poland. It was a royal city of Poland, the seat of the Land of Ciechanów, a separate administrative unit within the Masovian Voivodeship in the Greater Poland Province.

The town was handed over to Bona Sforza, as her dowry. Ciechanów prospered until the Swedish invasion of Poland (1655–1660), when the town was burned and ransacked.

=== Late modern period ===
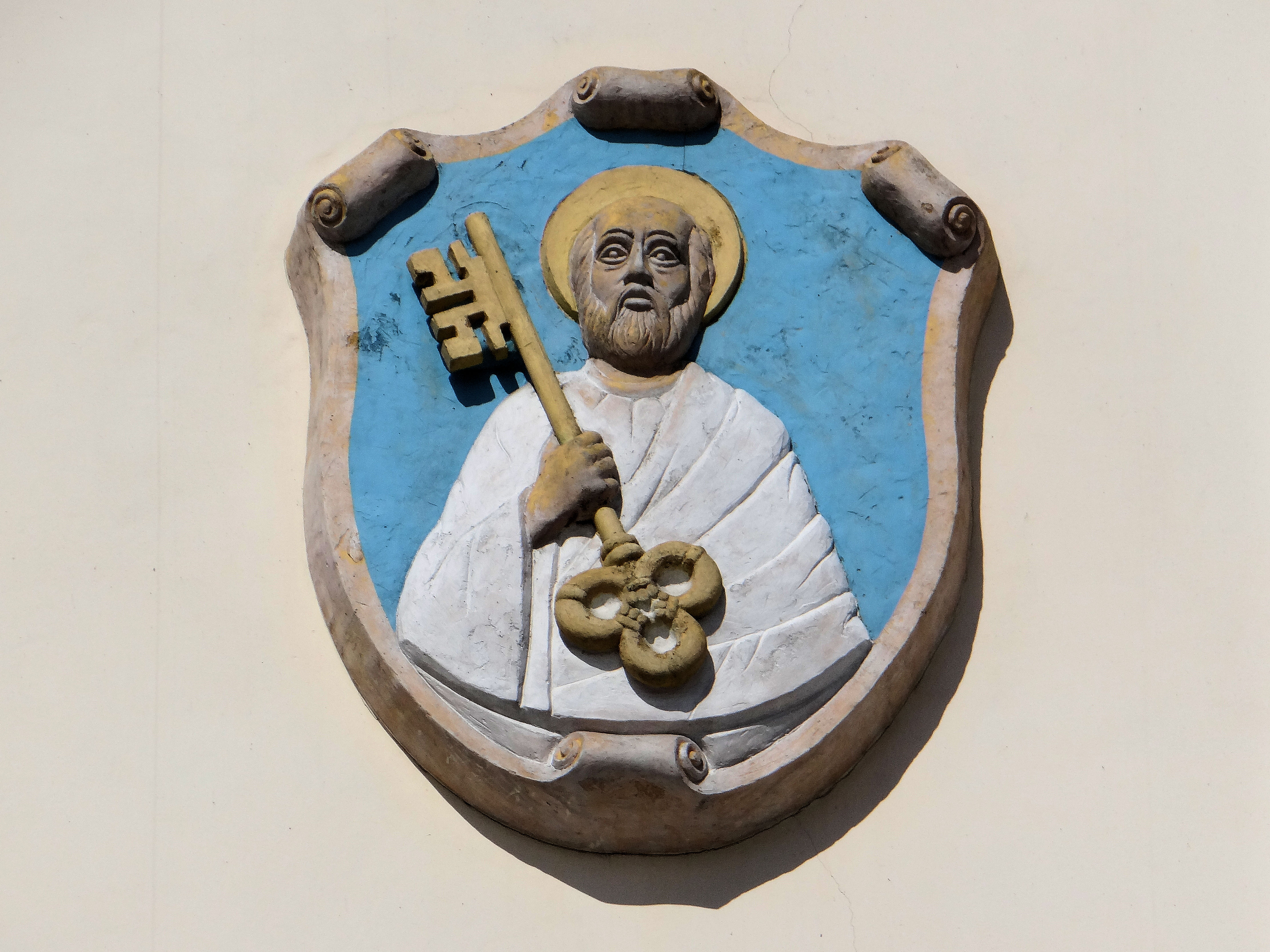
Ciechanów coat of arms on the facade of the town hall

After the Second Partition of Poland (1793), Ciechanów briefly became seat of a newly created voivodeship. In 1795, it was annexed by the Kingdom of Prussia, and reduced to the status of a provincial town in Przasnysz county. In 1806, during the Napoleonic Wars, Ciechanów was ransacked and destroyed. In 1807 it became part of the short-lived Polish Duchy of Warsaw. Since 1815, the town belonged to Russian-controlled Congress Poland. Its residents actively supported Polish rebellions. As part of anti-Polish repressions, the Augustinian monastery was dissolved in 1864. In the late 19th century, Ciechanów emerged as a local trade and industry center. In 1864, a brewery was opened, in 1867 it became seat of a county, in 1877 a rail station of the Vistula River Railroad was completed, and in 1882 a sugar refinery was opened. The period of prosperity was short, as during World War I, Ciechanów was almost completely destroyed. Following World War I, in 1918, Poland regained independence and control of the town.

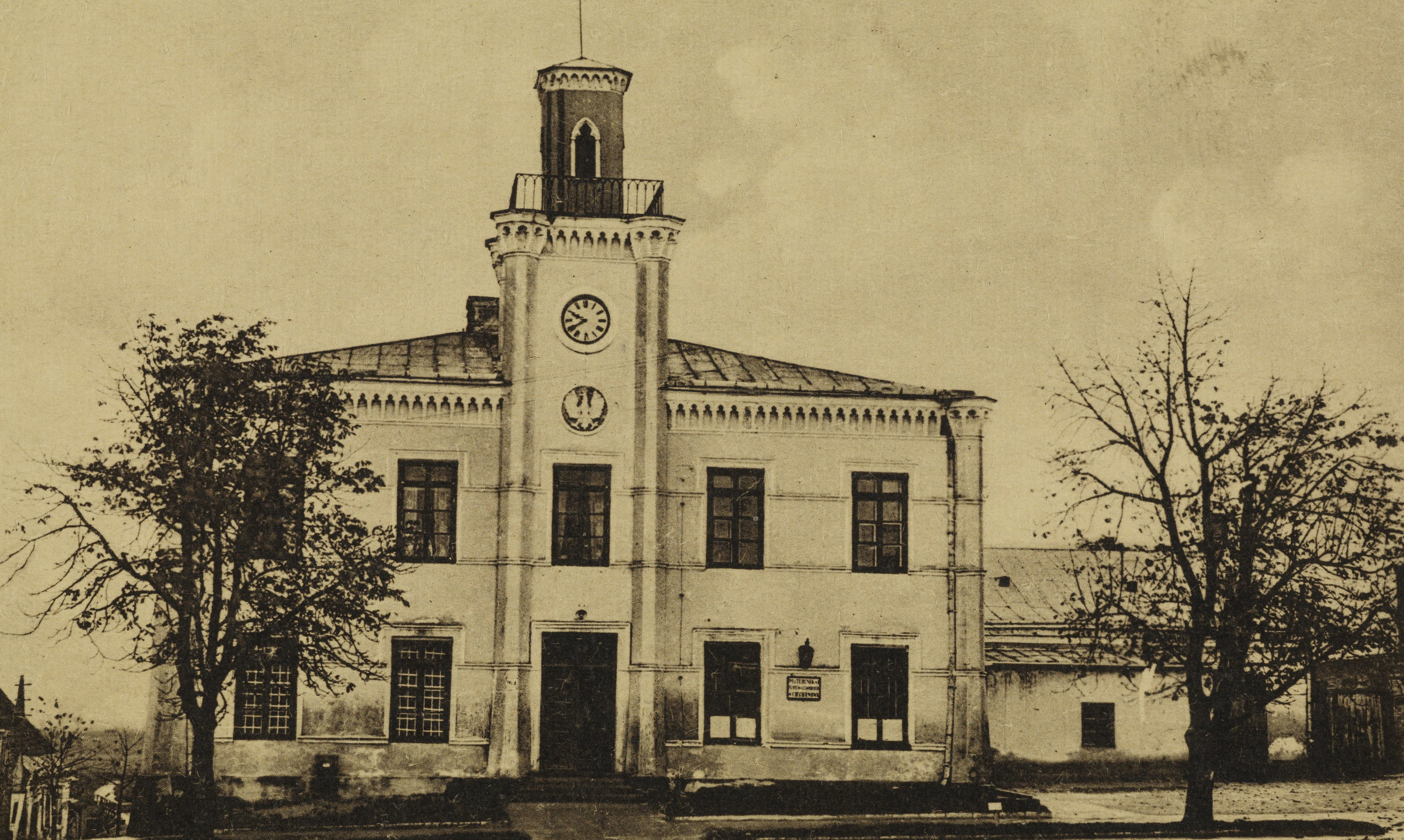
Early-20th-century view of the town hall

During the Polish–Soviet War, in 1920, the town was briefly occupied by the Soviet Russians, who resorted to rape and looting of stores, houses and schools. The one remaining Catholic priest was harassed by the occupiers, however, thanks to the intercession of the local population, he avoided deportation or death. 150 Polish soldiers were hid from the Russians by the local Jews in the synagogue. Some local socialists and intelligentsia joined the occupation structures for diversionary purposes, and when the Polish army reached the city again, on 15 August 1920, they immediately disarmed several hundred Soviets.

In the Second Polish Republic, Ciechanów remained seat of a county in Warsaw Voivodeship. In 1938, its population was 15,000, and the town was a military garrison, home to the 11th Uhlan Regiment of Marshall Edward Smigly-Rydz.

=== World War II ===
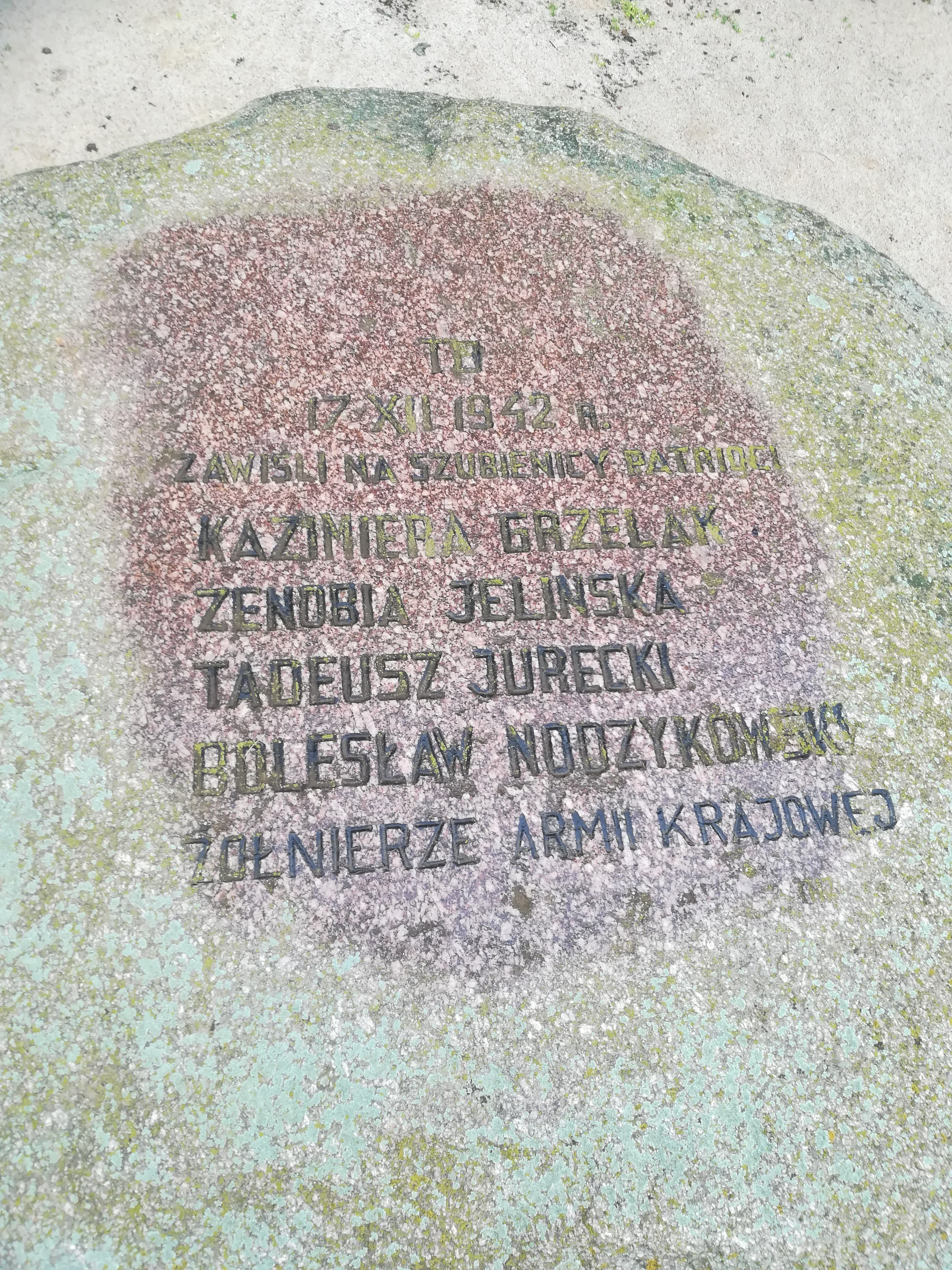
Memorial to Home Army soldiers murdered by the Germans in the castle in 1942

Ciechanów was captured by the Wehrmacht on the night of 3-4 September 1939. The town was annexed by Nazi Germany and was known as Zichenau in German. It was the capital of Regierungsbezirk Zichenau, a new subdivision of the Province of East Prussia. The vast majority of the Polish and Jewish population was seen as racially inferior and Germany planned its eventual annihilation. The Einsatzgruppe V entered the city on 10 September 1939, and carried out first mass arrests among local Polish intelligentsia. Residents were imprisoned in Gestapo jails established in municipal buildings and the Town Hall. The Germans carried out mass searches of Polish and Jewish homes, offices and organizations, as well as synagogues, which were desecrated and looted. Several hundred Poles were transported from the jail in Ciechanów and murdered in large massacres in the nearby village of Ościsłowo as part of Intelligenzaktion. Local disabled people were also murdered in Ościsłowo on 20 February 1940. Local teachers were arrested in October and November 1939, and deported to the Soldau concentration camp, where they were murdered in December 1939, and some were also murdered in the Mauthausen concentration camp. The occupiers operated three forced labour camps for Poles and Jews.

Poles were also subjected to expulsions. Around 600 people were expelled in December 1939, further expulsions were carried out in subsequent years. In Ciechanów, the Germans also organized a transit camp for Poles deported for forced labor to the areas of Klaipėda, Tilsit (Sovetsk) and Königsberg (Kaliningrad), and a forced labor "education" camp.

Before World War II, Ciechanów was home to a large Jewish community of 1,800, but during the Nazi German occupation, in November 1942, the majority of the Jewish community were transported to the Red Forest (Czerwony Bór) northeast of town and murdered in a mass shooting. During the war many Polish Jews and resistance fighters were executed by the Germans in the castle.

Prisoners of one of the forced labour camps were massacred by the Germans before their retreat. On 17 January 1945, Ciechanów was captured by the Red Army. The Soviet NKVD operated an assembly point for captured Polish resistance members in the city, who were then deported to Siberia. The Poles either returned to Poland later on, or died in Soviet captivity. The town was restored to Poland after the war.

== Demographics ==
Detailed data as of 31 December 2021:

Description	All		Women		Men	
Unit	person	percentage	person	percentage	person	percentage
Population	43495	100	22757	52.3%	20738	47.7%
Population density	1337.9		700.0		637.9	

Historical population

Year	Pop.	±%
1995	46,813	—
2000	46,564	−0.5%
2005	45,947	−1.3%
2010	45,548	−0.9%

Year	Pop.	±%
2015	44,506	−2.3%
2020	43,883	−1.4%
2021	43,495	−0.9%

== Monuments and sights ==
- Castle of the Mazovian Dukes from the 14th century, alongside the Łydynia river
- Farska Hill – fortified settlement from the 7th century with a Neo-Gothic belfry from the 19th century
- Church of the Nativity of the Virgin Mary, Late Gothic building from the 16th century
- Monastery Augustinian Church from the 16th and 18th centuries
- Ciechan Brewery, founded as a ducal brewery in the 18th century, available to visitors upon prior telephone reservation
- City Hall from the 19th century
- Muzeum Szlachty Mazowieckiej (Museum of Mazovian Nobility)
- Parish cemetery which has functioned since 1828
- Krzywa Hala, central building of the housing estate Bloki, built in 1942-1943 during the German occupation of Poland
- Park Nauki Torus ("Torus Science Park") with the hyperboloid water tower, built in 1972
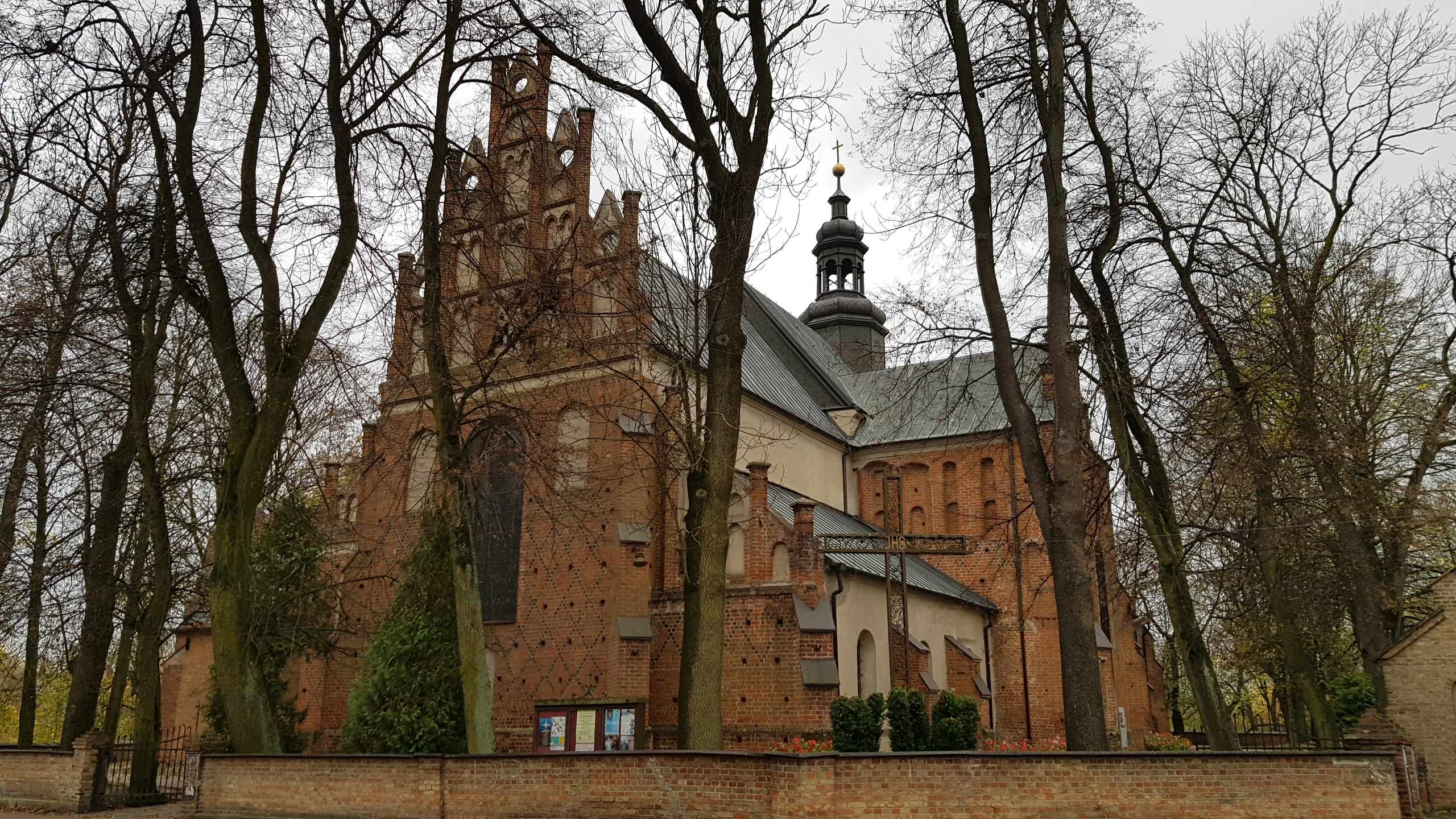
Church of the Nativity of the Virgin Mary

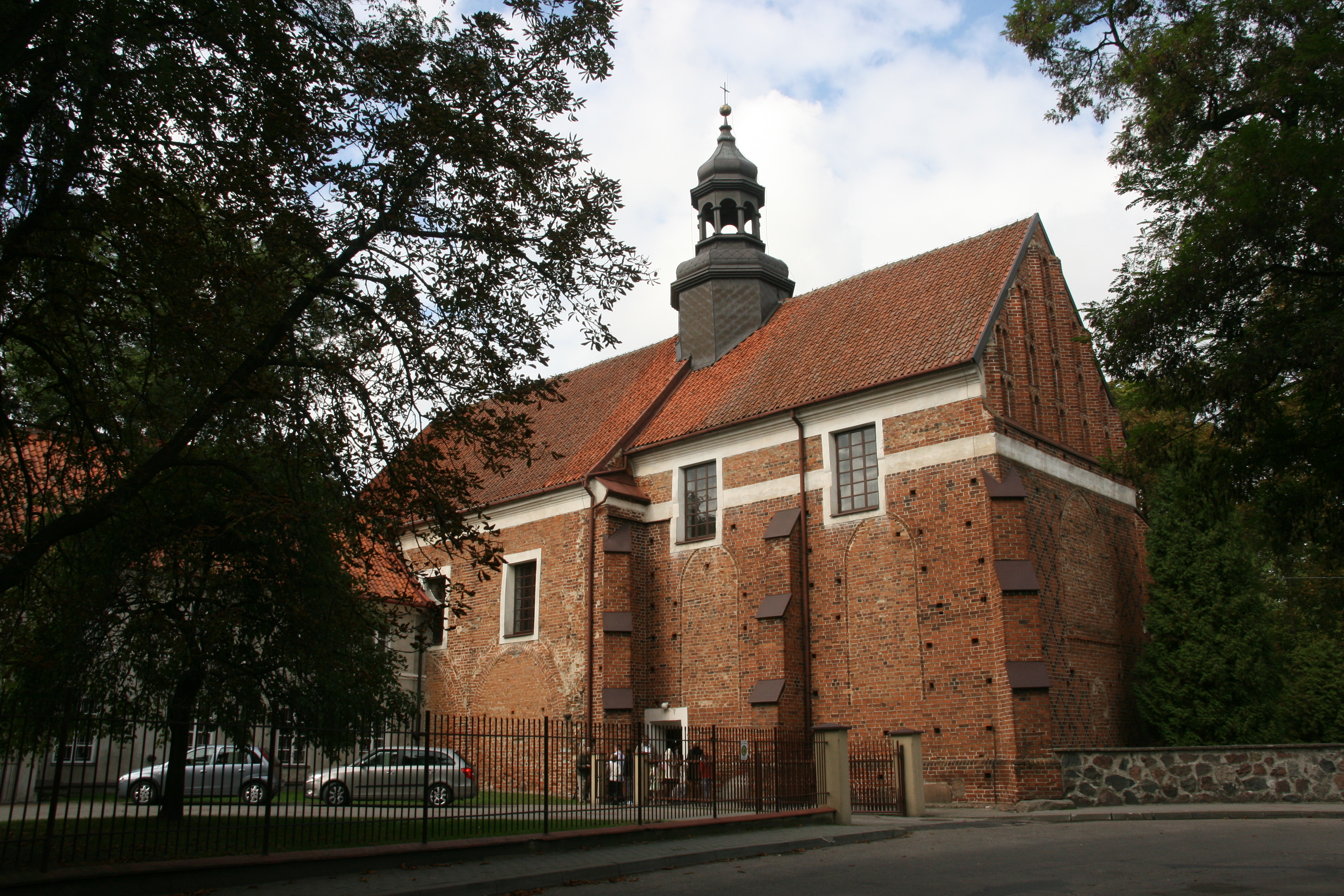
Augustinian Church

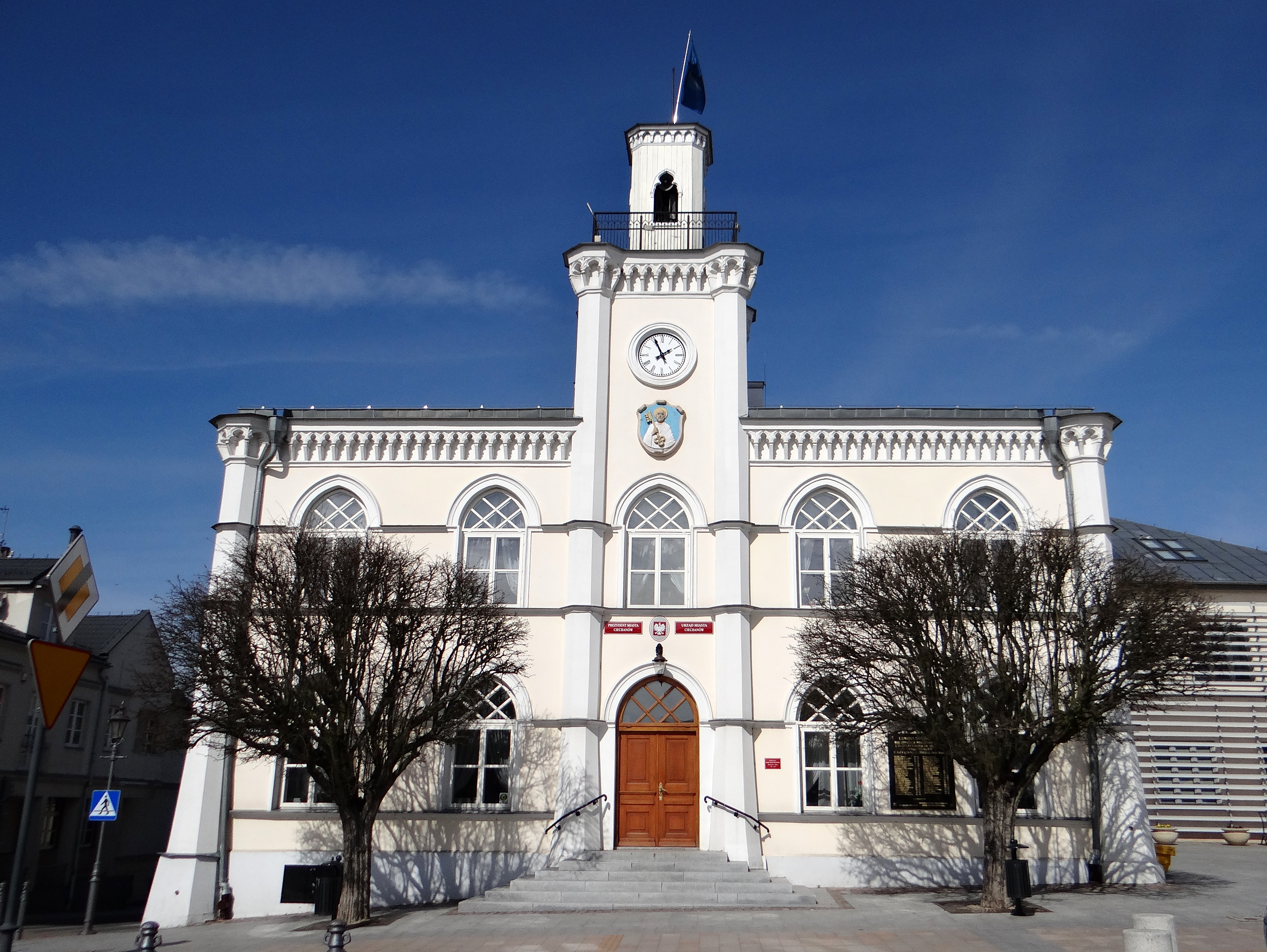
Town Hall

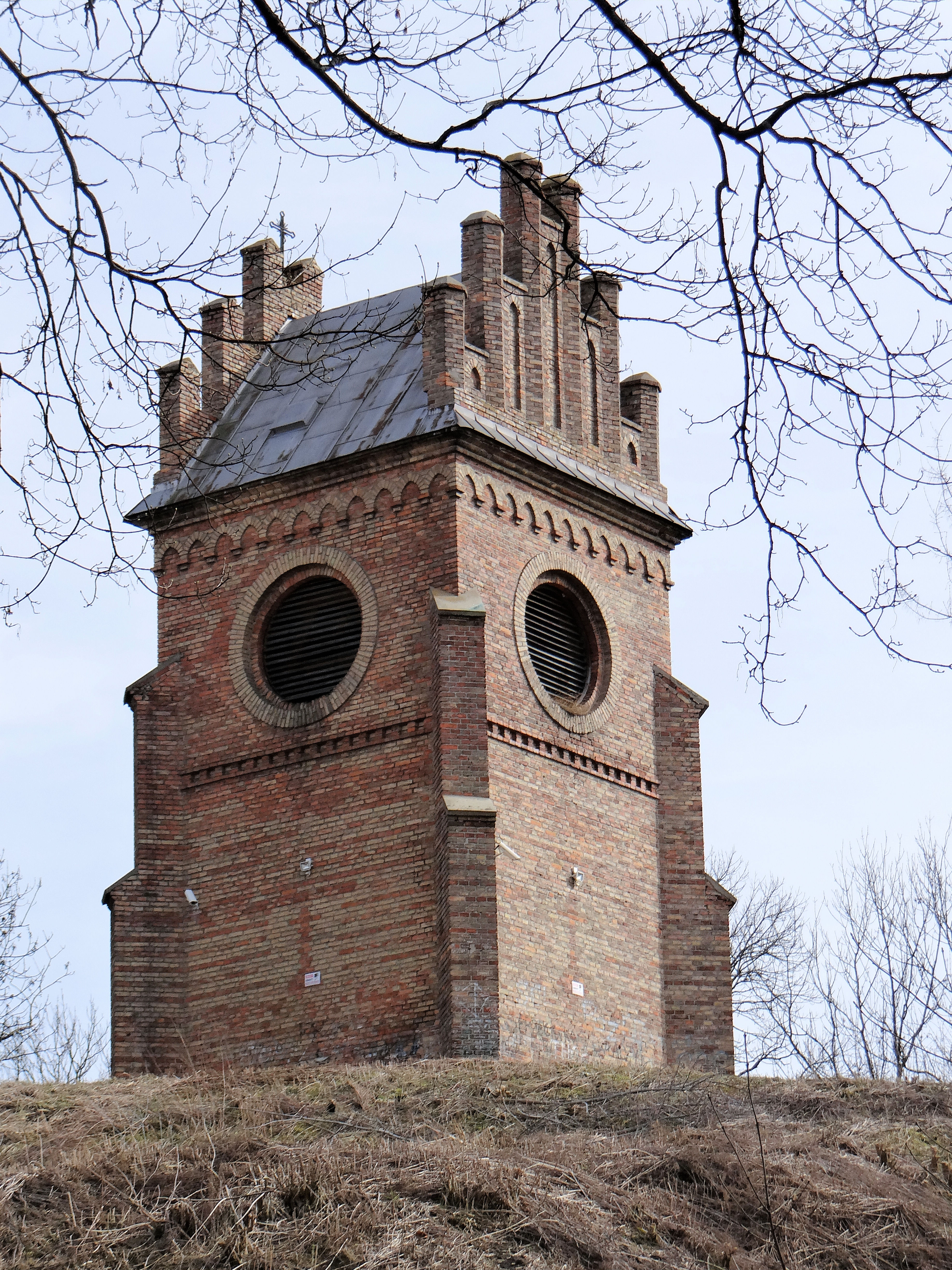
Belfry on Farska Góra

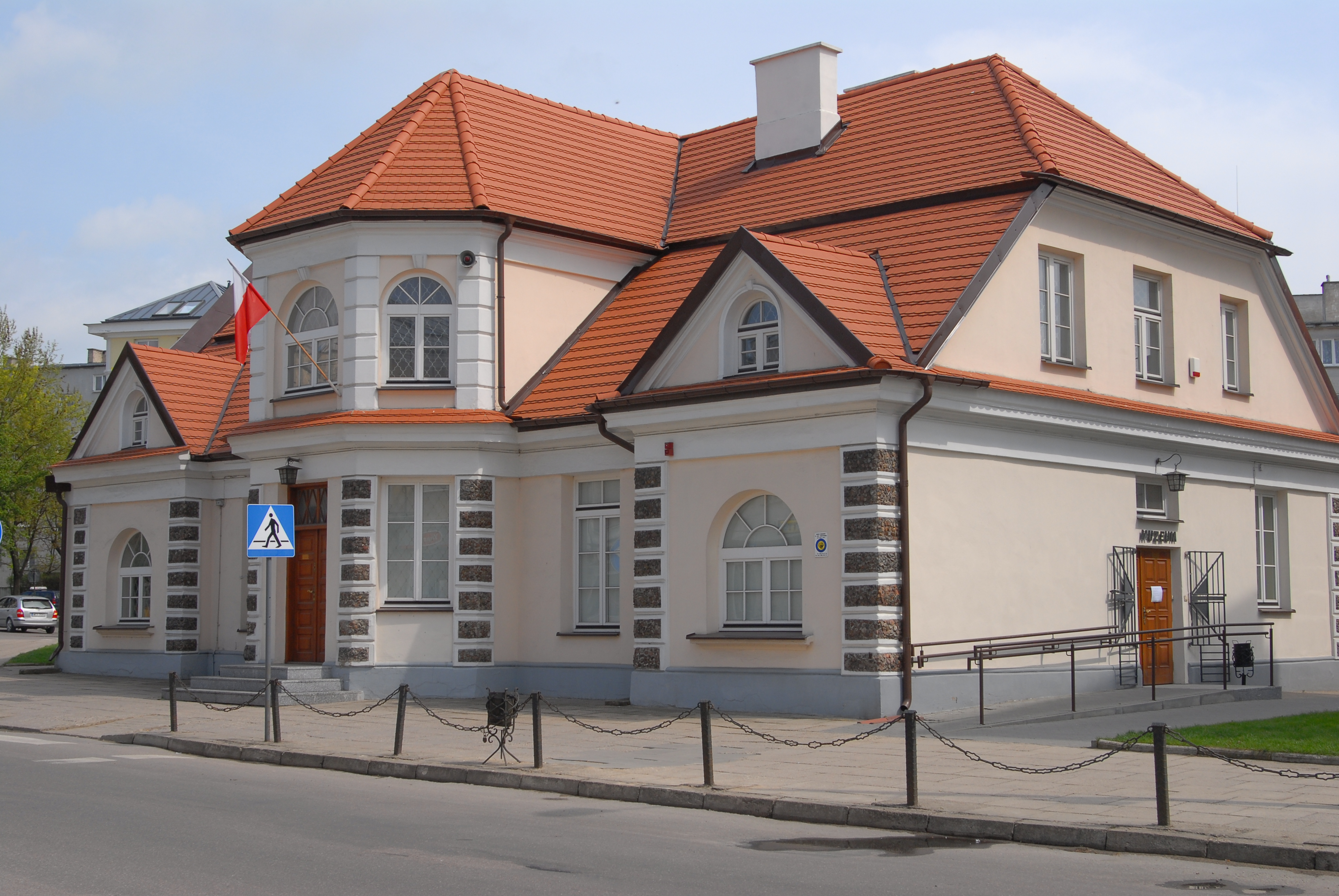
Museum of Mazovian Nobility

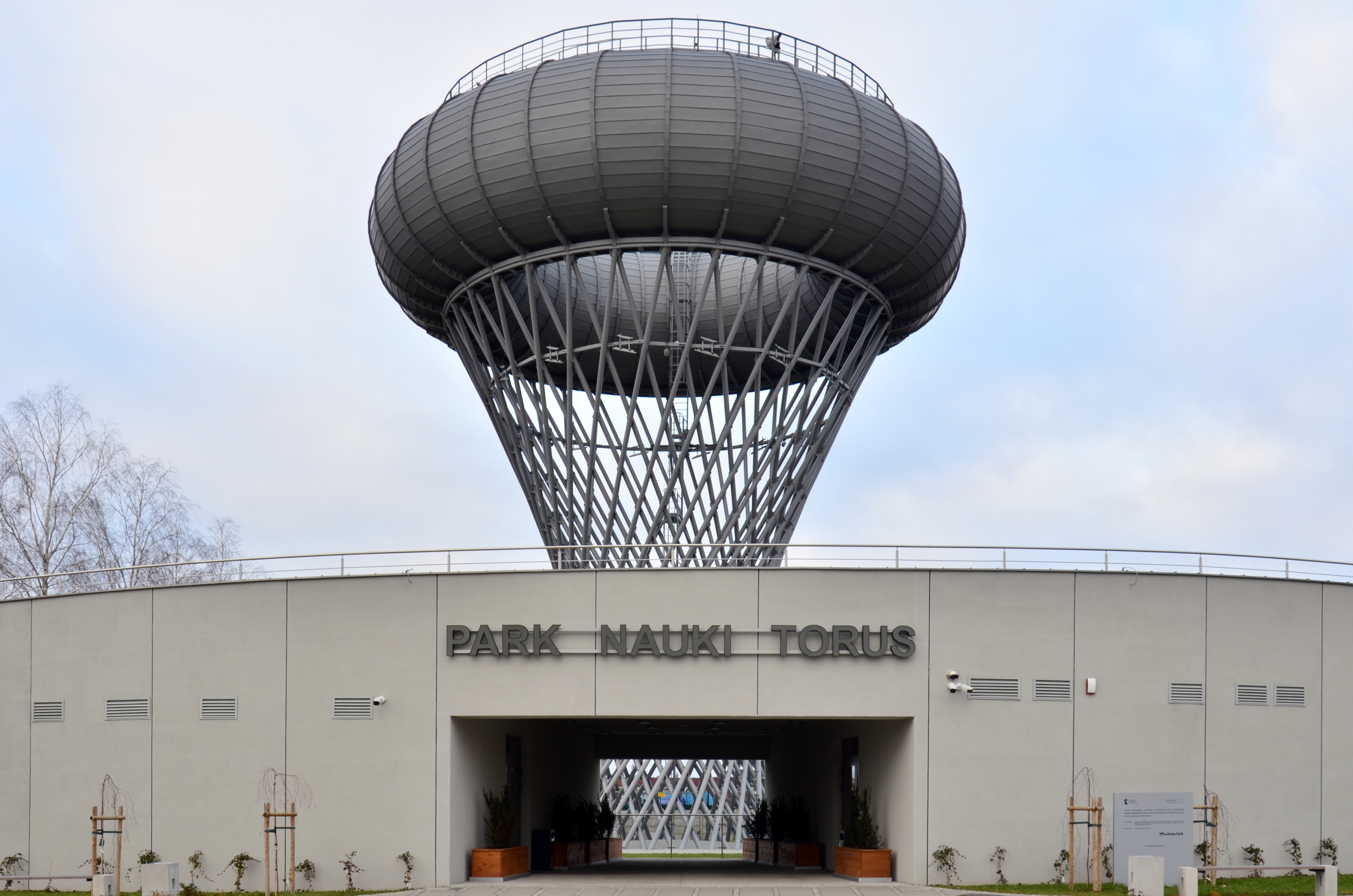
Torus Science Park

== Economy ==
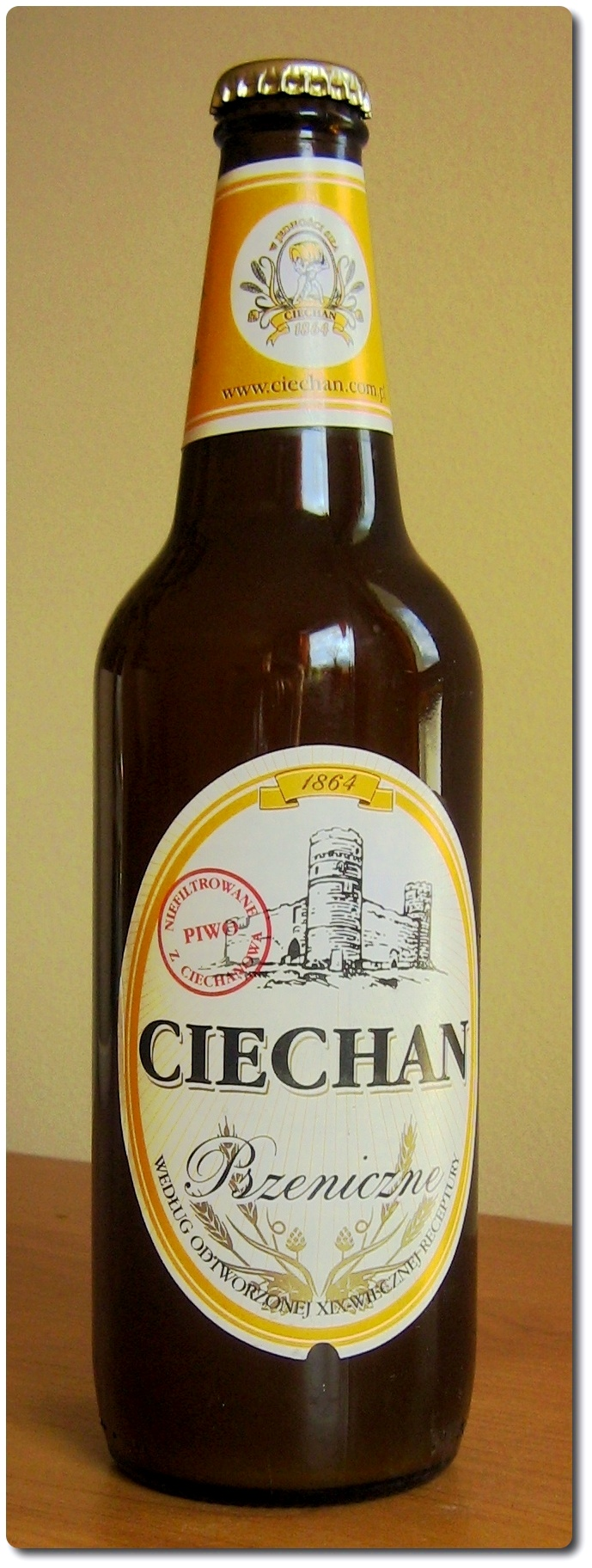
Beer from the local brewery

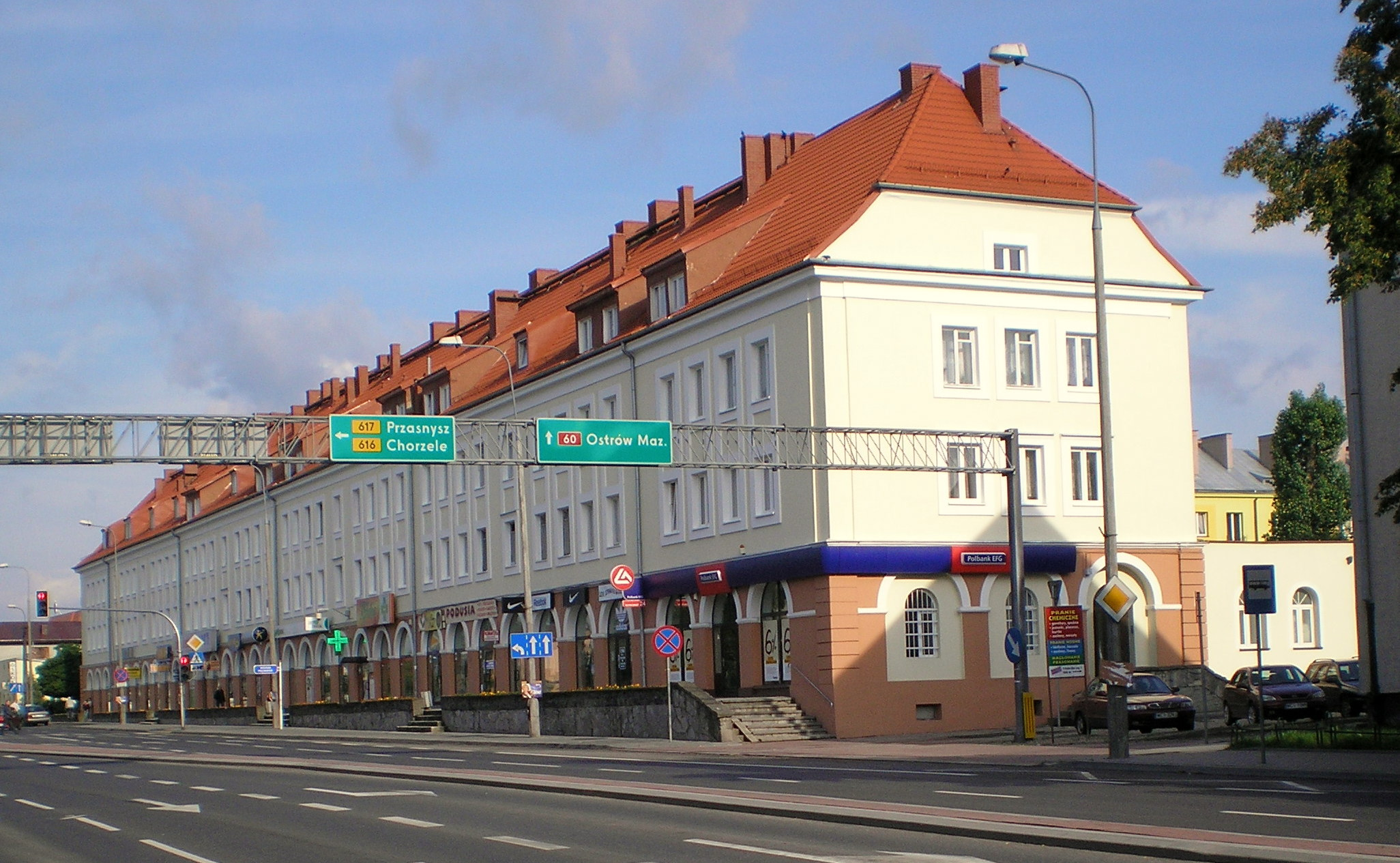
Pułtuska Hall

The Browar Ciechan brewery is located in the town.

== Education ==
- Państwowa Wyższa Szkoła Zawodowa
- Wyższa Szkoła Biznesu i Zarządzania

== Transport ==
Two national roads pass through the town, numbered 50 and 60; together with three voivodship roads, numbered 615, 616, 617. National road number 7, forming part of the E77 European route, lies some 25 km (16 mi) to the west.

Ciechanów railway station is on the Warsaw - Gdańsk railway; however, the Warsaw - Gdańsk - Gdynia express train, colloquially referred as 'Pendolino', does not stop here. Other trains offer connections to Warsaw, Olsztyn, Gdańsk, Gdynia, Kołobrzeg, Kraków and Łódź.

== Sports ==
Ciechanów is home to handball club Jurand Ciechanów, which competes in the I liga (Polish second tier), and to football club MKS Ciechanów, which competes in the lower divisions.

== Notable people ==
- Jan Kazimierz Krasiński (1607–1669), Polish official and nobleman, royal secretary of Polish King Sigismund III Vasa
- Ludwik Krasiński (1609–1644), Polish royal courtier and official
- Zygmunt Krasiński (1812–1859), Polish poet, considered one of Poland's Three Bards
- Maria Konopnicka (1842–1910), Polish poet and novelist
- Aleksander Świętochowski (1849–1938), Polish writer, educator, and philosopher
- Stefan Żeromski (1864–1925), Polish novelist and dramatist
- Ignacy Mościcki (1867–1946), Polish chemist, politician, and President of Poland
- Roza Robota (1921–1945), Polish-Jewish resistance member during World War II
- Mieczysław Jagielski (1924–1997), Polish politician and economist
- Zbigniew Siemiątkowski (born 1957), Polish politician
- Leszek Ojrzyński (born 1972), Polish football manager
- Dorota Rabczewska (Doda) (born 1984), Polish singer-songwriter
- Kasia Struss (born 1987), Polish model
- Marta Cienkowska (born 1987), Polish politician, Minister of Culture and National Heritage since 2025
- Quebonafide (born 1991), Polish rapper
- Adam Morawski (born 1994), Polish handball player, member of the Polish national handball team
- Ania Ahlborn, Polish-American novelist
- Alicja Szemplińska (born 2002), Polish singer

== International relations ==
=== Twin towns – Sister cities ===
Ciechanów is twinned with:

- Meudon, France
- Haldensleben, Germany
- Khmelnytskyi, Ukraine
- Brezno, Slovakia
