= Krasne, Masovian Voivodeship =

Krasne
- Village
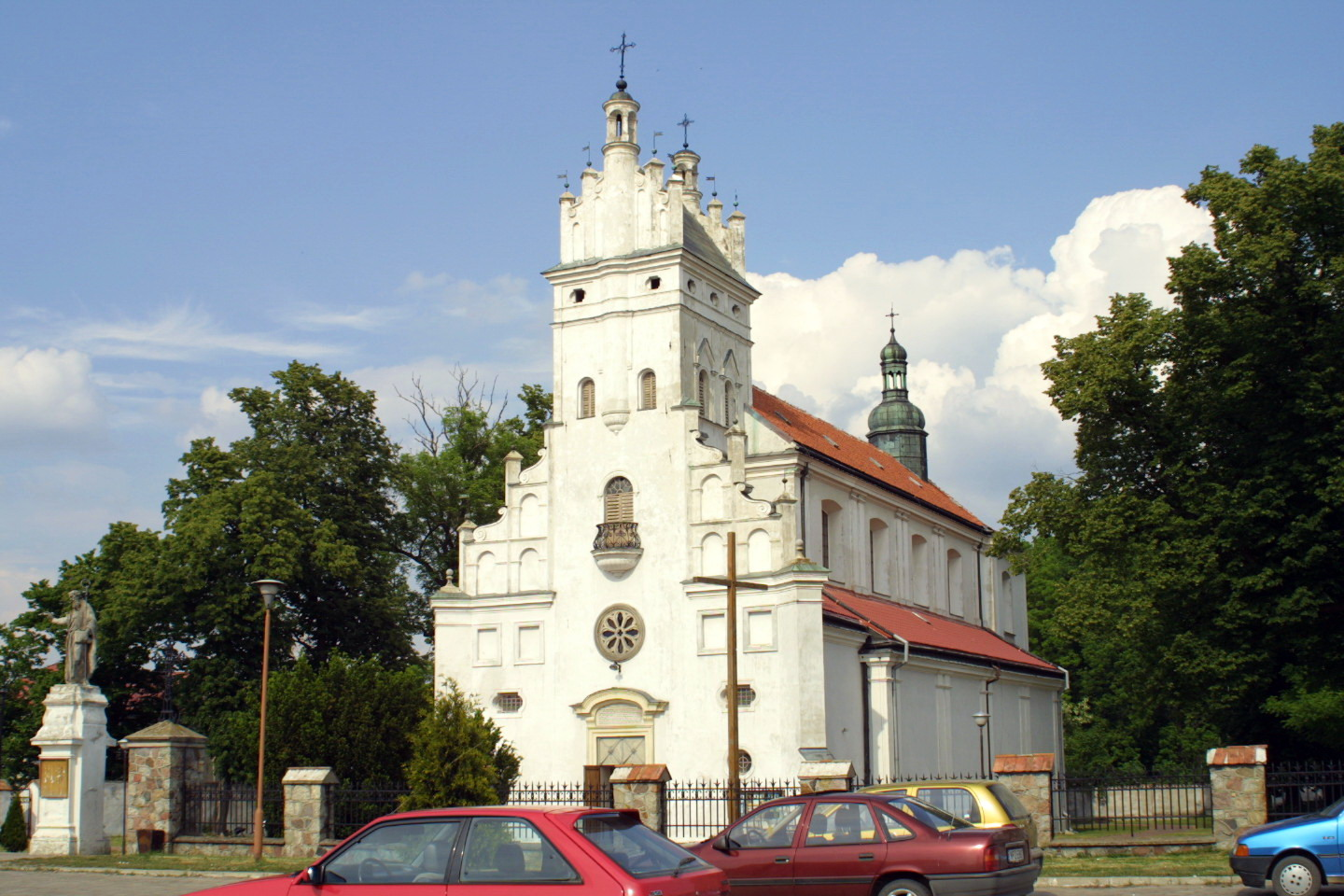
- Church of the Exaltation of the Holy Cross

- Location within Poland
- Coordinates: 52°55′16″N 20°58′8″E
- Country: Poland
- Voivodeship: Masovian
- County: Przasnysz
- Gmina: Krasne

Population
  - Total: 1,000
- Website: http://www.krasne.pl/

Krasne [ˈkrasnɛ] is a village in Przasnysz County, Masovian Voivodeship, in east-central Poland. It is the seat of the gmina (administrative district) called Gmina Krasne.

During World War II, it was the seat of Erich Koch, the last Oberpräsident of East Prussia. It was situated in the Zichenau Region.

== History ==
Krasne is the ancestral nest of the Krasiński family of the Ślepowron coat of arms.
