= Płock Voivodeship (1975–1998) =

Former administrative division of Poland

Coordinates: 52°32′48″N 19°41′20″E

Płock Voivodeship Województwo płockie
- Voivodeship of Poland
- 1975–1998
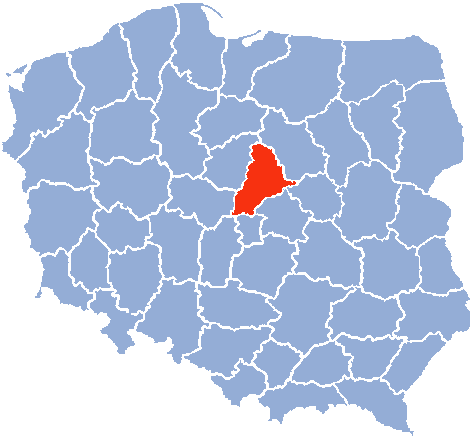
- Capital: Płock
- Area
- 5,117 km^{2} (1,976 sq mi)
- History
  - Established: 1975
  - Disestablished: 1998
- Today part of: Poland

Płock Voivodeship (Polish: województwo płockie) was a unit of administrative division and local government in Poland from 1975 to 1998. In 1998 its population was over half a million people. It existed earlier from the 15th century till 1795. The more recent one was superseded by Łódź Voivodeship and Masovian Voivodeship.

Its capital city was Płock.

Major cities and towns: (population in 1995):

- Płock (126,900),
- Kutno (51,000),
- Gostynin (20,200).

== Plock Voivodeship (15th century-1795) ==
Płock Voivodeship (Polish: Województwo Płockie) was a unit of administrative division and local government in the Kingdom of Poland from the 15th century till the partitions of Poland in 1795. Together with the Rawa Voivodeship and Masovian Voivodeship it formed the province of Mazovia.

=== Płock Voivodeship 1816–1837 ===
Płock Voivodeship was one of the voivodeships of Congress Poland. Formed from Płock Department, transformed into Płock Governorate.

== See also ==
- Voivodeships of Poland
