= Krasiński =

Krasiński (sometimes spelled Krasinsky, if originally transliterated from Russian, Ukrainian or Belarusian) is a surname of Polish, or generally Slavic, origin.

In its feminine version, the Polish surname becomes Krasińska, and the Russian or Belarusian surname may become Krasinskaya.

== Krasiński family ==
Krasiński family is a Polish noble family. Notable members of the Krasiński family may include:

- Adam Stanisław Krasiński (1714–1800), Polish noble and bishop
- Elżbieta Krasińska-Jaraczewska (1791–1832), Polish writer
- Franciszka Krasińska (1742–1796), Polish noblewoman and wife of Charles of Saxony, Duke of Courland
- Jan Dobrogost Krasiński (1639–1717), Polish noble and politician
- Jan Kazimierz Krasiński (1607–1669), Polish noble and courtier
- Jan Krasiński (1756–1790), Polish noble and military commander
- Ludwik Krasiński (1609–1644), Polish noble and military commander
- Kazimierz Krasiński (1725–1802), Count, Polish noble, politician and patron of arts
- Maria Ludwika Krasińska (1883–1958), Polish noble, major heiress
- Marya Krasińska (1850–1884), Polish noble and landowner
- Michał Hieronim Krasiński (1712–1784), Polish noble and politician
- Stanisław Krasiński (c. 1558 – 1617), Polish noble and governor
- Stanisław Krasiński (1585–1649), Polish-Lithuanian nobleman, jurist, member of parliament
- Walerian Krasiński (1795–1855), Polish historian and journalist
- Wincenty Krasiński (1782–1858), Count, Polish noble, military commander, senator, father of the poet Zygmunt Krasiński
- Władysław Krasiński (1844–1873), Count, Polish noble, son of the poet Zygmunt Krasiński
- Zofia Krasińska (died 1642 or 1643), Polish noble lady
- Zygmunt Krasiński (1812–1859), Polish romantic poet

== Other people named Krasinski / Krasinsky ==
- Georgij A. Krasinsky (1939–2011), Russian astronomer
- John Krasinski (born 1979), American actor
- Mathilde Kschessinska (1872–1971), Russian prima ballerina of Polish origin, a.k.a. Princess Romanova-Krasinskaya

== See also ==
- 5714 Krasinsky, a minor planet named after Georgij A. Krasinsky
- Krasiński Garden, an urban park in Warsaw, Poland
- Krasiński Library, a former library in Warsaw
- Krasiński Palace, a baroque palace in Warsaw, Poland, within the Downtown district
- Krasiński Palace (Ursynów), Renaissance Revival palace in Warsaw, Poland, within the district of Ursynów
- Krasiński Square, a square in the central district of Warsaw, Poland
- Krasiński Tenement, a historical building in Warsaw, Poland
- Krasinsky, Volgograd Oblast, rural locality in Solontsovskoye Rural Settlement, Russia
- The Legend of Madame Krasinska, 1903 book of Vernon Lee
- Karasiński
