= Sigrid Sparre =

Sigrid Sparre (Sigrid Maria Josefina Ingeborg Richissa Eufemia Ulfhild; 1 September 1825, in Nygård – 17 November 1910, in Stockholm) was a Swedish lady in waiting and noblewoman, known for her relationship with Charles XV of Sweden.

Sigrid Sparre was the daughter of General-major Baron Sixten David Sparre and Sofia Amalia Eleonora Lewenhaupt, and the cousin of governor Knut Sparre.

She was the hovfröken (maid of honor) of queen Josephine of Sweden in 1844–1850 and became known for her love affair with Crown Prince Charles. The queen gave her Catholic confessor, Jacob Lorentz Studach, the task to provide evidence of the affair by catching the couple together. This was achieved on Tullgarn Palace in 1850, after which Sparre lost her position and was forced to leave court, despite the protests of Charles. This forced separation from Sparre caused severe and lasting damage in the relationship between Charles and his mother, as well as cementing an antipathy against Catholicism in Charles. Charles described Sigrid as his only "true love" and also composed a poem dedicated to her. He later commented to the brother of Sigrid Sparre: "Your sister has been my only love - if she had become mine, I would have been a different person."

In 1852, Sigrid Sparre married the nobleman commander Fredrik Thure Cederström (1808–1886). She had three sons, and became known for her philanthropic efforts during the tenure of her spouse as commander of Karlskrona (1858–68). Charles married Princess Louise of the Netherlands in 1850, courted the noblewomen Stani Eketrä and Aurore Palin and had a relationship with first Laura Bergnéhr and then with a relative of Sigrid, Josephine Sparre.
