= Josephine Sparre =

Josephine Sophie Anette Charlotte Sparre af Söfdeborg (28 July 1829, Dyrendal, Norway – 17 August 1892), called "Jossan" or "Schossan", was a Swedish noble, lady-in-waiting and a royal mistress to King Charles XV of Sweden.

== Life ==
Josephine Sparre was born to Swedish noble colonel chamberlain Johan Alexander Artemis Sparre and the Norwegian Sofia Adelaide Rosalie Ancker. She was the sibling of politician Nils Gustaf Alexander Sparre and niece to minister Gustaf Adolf Vive Sparre.

Sparre was hovfröken (maid of honor) to the crown princess of Sweden, Louise of the Netherlands, in 1851–1859, and kammarfröken (senior maid of honor) in 1859–1862. Sparre was described as so dominant that the Crown Princess and her maid of honor were said to have changed places with each other, with Louise being the lady-in-waiting to Josephine Sparre rather than the other way around.

Sparre was the mistress of Crown Prince Charles between 1852 and 1860. Prior to their relationship, Charles had a relationship with her relative Sigrid Sparre and then to the actress-courtesan Laura Bergnéhr. Fritz von Dardel described Sparre:

The lady in question is a great favorite of the Crown Prince as well as with the Crown Princess, and she governs them both entirely in everything about their daily life. Gifted with an unusual talent to please and make herself indispensable, she has managed to capture the Crown Prince to a strange degree."

— Robert Braun, Silvertronen. En bok om drottning Josefine av Sverige-Norge, page 99,

All the sympathies were with Louisa, who in turn acted very tolerant toward Sparre and Charles and acted as if she had not noticed the affair. Sparre became unpopular within the court due to her way of demonstrating her relationship with Charles, following him around openly at court "like a patch", and the general lack of discretion around the ongoing relationship. Charles XV did, however, have several more temporary affairs in parallel, such as his reputed affair with Elise Hwasser in circa 1857.

Sparre was engaged several times, once with foreign minister Oscar Björnstjerna, but broke the engagement in 1856 because she did not wish to leave the crown prince and the court. In about 1860, however, Charles XV entered in to his relationship with Hanna Styrell. In 1862, Sparre married Norwegian cabinet chamberlain Bredo Stang with the royal couple present. After her marriage, she settled in Norway. During the Union of Sweden and Norway, the royal family had a separate court in Norway who met the royal family at the border and served them during their stay. During her life in Norway, Josephine Sparre resumed her court service when she was appointed statsfru (Lady of the Bedchamber) to Queen Louise's Norwegian household under Juliane Wedel Jarlsberg between 1864 and 1871. Her office at the Norwegian court was uncommon, as the royal family's household in Norway was much smaller and the office of statsfru had not been filled there since the reign of Charles XIV John. Her service at the royal Norwegian court was much more irregular, as the royal family spent the majority of their time in Sweden.

She died in 1892.
