= Old Academy (disambiguation) =

Old Academy refers to the first era of the Platonic Academy.

Old Academy may also refer to:

- Old Academy (Munich), a building also known as the Wilhelminum in Munich, Germany
- Old Academy, Perth, a historic building in Perth, Scotland
- Old Academy Building, a building in Cathedral Square in Turku, Finland
