= Haga Palace =

Palace in Stockholm, Sweden

- Haga slott
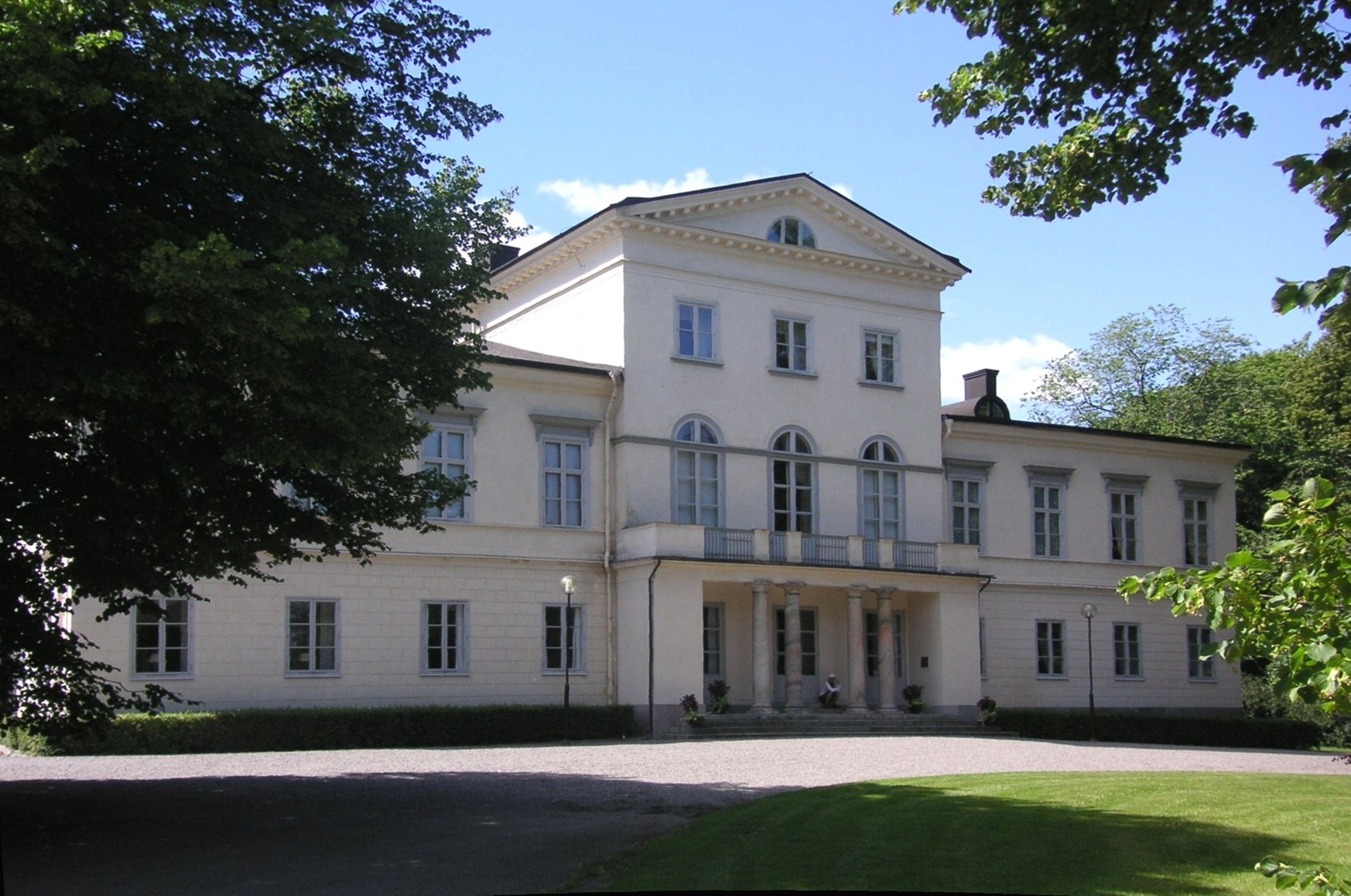
- Haga Palace in 2008

- Location within Stockholm

General information
- Status: In use
- Type: Palace
- Architectural style: Neoclassicism
- Location: Solna, Sweden
- Coordinates: 59°21′48″N 18°02′21.9″E
- Current tenants: Royal Court of Sweden
- Construction started: 1802
- Completed: 1805
- Owner: The Swedish State
- Landlord: National Property Board of Sweden

Technical details
- Floor count: 3

Design and construction
- Architect: Carl Christoffer Gjörwell

Other information
- Number of rooms: 41

Website
- Haga Palace

Haga Palace (Swedish: Haga slott), formerly known as the Queen's Pavilion (Swedish: Drottningens paviljong), is located in Haga Park, Solna Municipality, in Metropolitan Stockholm, Sweden. The palace is today the residence of Victoria, Crown Princess of Sweden, Prince Daniel, Duke of Västergötland, and their family.

The palace was built between 1802 and 1805 for King Gustav IV Adolf and his family. Designed by architect Carl Christoffer Gjörwell, it was conceived as a modern Italian-style villa for the royal children and modelled on ballet master Louis Gallodier's villa at Hvilan on Drottningholm. Construction began in May 1802, and although the exterior was largely complete by 1803, work on the interiors continued until late 1805.

During the 19th and 20th centuries, Haga Palace served as a residence and summer home for several members of the Swedish royal family. From the 1820s it was used as a summer residence by the future King Oscar I and Crown Princess Josephine. It was later occupied by Prince August, Duke of Dalarna, and his wife, Princess Therese of Saxe-Altenburg, who remained at Haga until her death in 1914.

Following extensive renovation, Prince Gustaf Adolf, Duke of Västerbotten, and Princess Sibylla moved into Haga Palace after their marriage in 1932. Their children included Princesses Margaretha, Birgitta, Désirée and Christina – known collectively as the Hagaprinsessorna ("the Haga Princesses") – and the future King Carl XVI Gustaf. Carl XVI Gustaf was born at Haga Palace in 1946.

Haga Palace subsequently entered a period of government use. In January 1966, King Gustaf VI Adolf granted the Swedish government the right to use the palace and its associated grounds for official purposes. It subsequently served as a government guest residence for visiting foreign dignitaries and heads of state.

On 23 April 2009, the government announced that it would relinquish its right to use Haga Palace, allowing it to become the future home of Crown Princess Victoria and her then fiancé Daniel Westling. Prime Minister Fredrik Reinfeldt said that discussions had taken place with the couple before the decision and that the palace itself remained under the King's right of disposal. The formal transfer took place on 1 October 2009.

Crown Princess Victoria and Prince Daniel married at Stockholm Cathedral on 19 June 2010 and moved into Haga Palace in the autumn of that year. The palace has since served as the home of the Crown Princess family.

== History ==
Following the assassination of King Gustav III in 1792, plans for his monumental palace at Brunnsviken were abandoned. His son and successor, Gustav IV Adolf, eventually commissioned Carl Christoffer Gjörwell to design a smaller royal residence at Haga. Gjörwell had worked at Haga since 1788, where he studied under Louis Jean Desprez during work on both Gustav III’s pavilion and the unfinished Brunnsviken palace, and had also designed the Echo Temple. Construction of the new palace proceeded rapidly after the foundations were laid in May 1802. Contractor Herman Edberg employed specialist masons and carpenters alongside infantrymen from Södermanlands regemente, and by December 1803 the scaffolding had been removed and the marble columns erected.

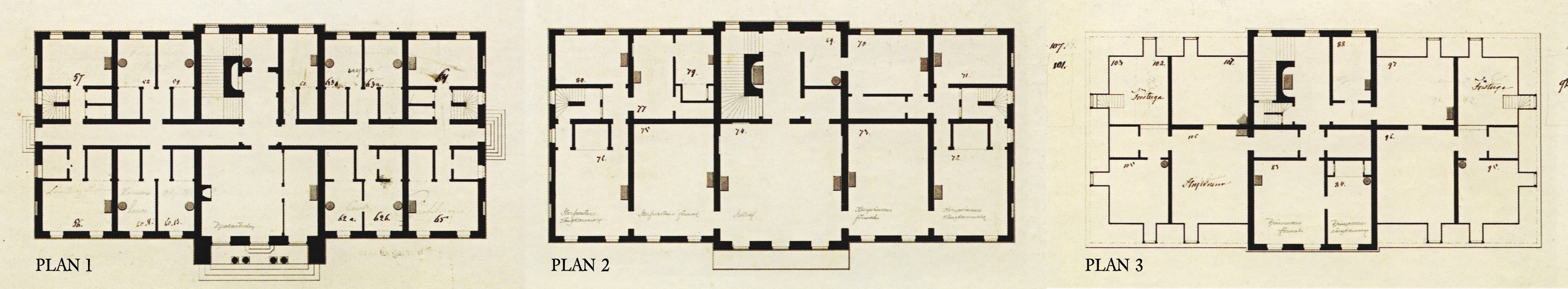
Floor plan for Haga Palace from the first half of the nineteenth-century.

Several elements of the building incorporated materials with earlier royal histories. Its marble columns originated in Finland and had been taken to Poland during the reign of Sigismund III Vasa, before being returned to Sweden by Gustavus Adolphus. Nicodemus Tessin the Younger later incorporated them into the German Church in Karlskrona; following the church’s reconstruction after a fire in 1790, fourteen became available for reuse at Haga. Oak flooring was taken from Fredrikshov Palace, while stone originally acquired for Gustav III’s abandoned palace at Brunnsviken was incorporated into the new residence.

Haga returned to regular royal use during the 19th century. In the 1860s it was renovated for Prince August, Duke of Dalarna, the youngest son of Oscar I, and his wife Princess Therese of Saxe-Altenburg. Therese remained closely associated with Haga until her death in 1914, having lived there for 54 years and substantially shaped its domestic character. The palace then stood largely unused by the royal family until another major renovation preceded the arrival of Prince Gustaf Adolf, Duke of Västerbotten, and Princess Sibylla of Saxe-Coburg and Gotha in 1932. Following Gustaf Adolf’s death in the KLM DC-3 crash at Copenhagen Airport on 26 January 1947, Sibylla and their five children eventually ceased living at Haga full-time.

The palace subsequently acquired a governmental function. In 1966, Gustaf VI Adolf placed it at the government’s disposal as an official residence for distinguished foreign visitors, although it was used relatively infrequently for this purpose. Following the decision to return Haga to royal residential use in 2009, the building was renovated for Crown Princess Victoria and Prince Daniel. The couple took up residence there on 15 November 2010.

== See also ==
- Gustav III's Pavilion
