= Edward Raczyński =

Edward Raczyński was the name of three members of a Polish aristocratic family:

- Edward Raczyński (1786–1845) Polish conservative politician, protector of arts, founder of the Raczynski Library in Poznań
- Edward Aleksander Raczyński (1847–1926) grandson of E. Raczyński, founder of the famous Raczyński Art Gallery in Rogalin
- Edward Bernard Raczyński (1891–1993), son of E. A. Raczyński, Polish aristocrat, diplomat, politician and the President of Poland in exile between 1979 and 1986
