= Ohan Demirgian =

Egyptian-Armenian diplomat (1837–1877)

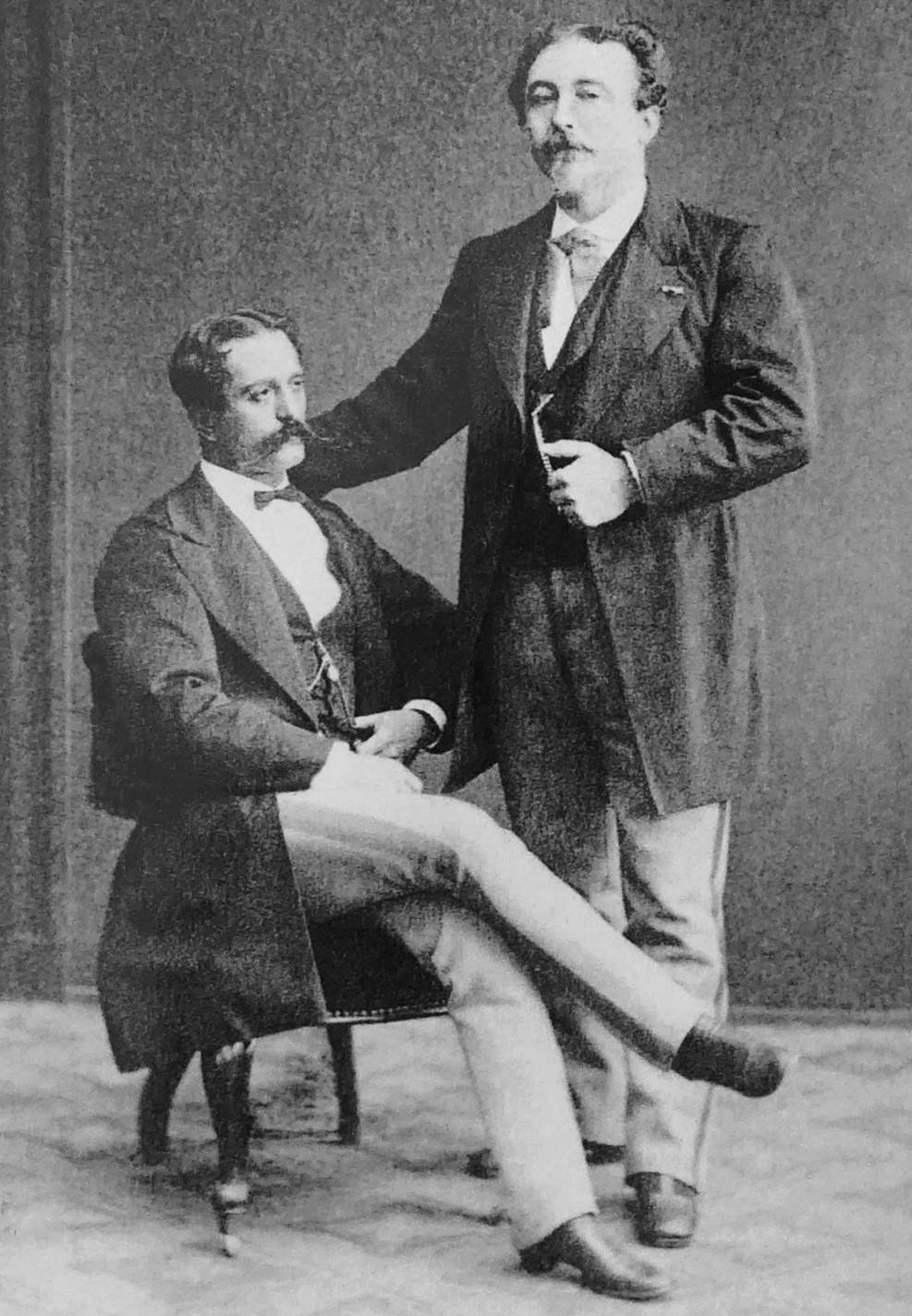
Ohan Demirgian (sitting)

Ohan Demirgian, or Démirdjian in French, also called Habib Bey (14 January 1837 – 1877), was an Egyptian-Armenian diplomat. He was the favorite of king Charles XV of Sweden.

== Biography ==
Demirgian was an Armenian and the son of the Egyptian foreign minister Stephan Bey. He was a student of the Mission égyptienne in Paris before he was employed as a secretary in the foreign ministry of the Egyptian vice-roy khediven Isma'il Pasha. Demirgian lived in France from 1844 to 1853 and studied at the Collège Stanislas de Paris and in Versailles. Thereafter, he moved to England where he lived for two years. After furthering his education in England, he returned to Egypt in 1855 where he married Arouse Araigian in 1859.

He met Prince August, Duke of Dalarna in Egypt in 1860. In 1866, he was placed in Sweden as the envoy of the Egyptian khedive. Demirgian were described as an adventurer, and his presence at court was regarded a scandal. He became a favorite of Charles XV, who awarded him Swedish citizenship in 1867, named him his secondary royal stable master at Ulriksdal Palace at 1868, and bestowed him several royal orders including the Order of Vasa.

Demirgian was disliked at the Swedish royal court, where he was referred to as The Demiurg. He resided in a house next to the Ulriksdal Palace, where he reportedly lived in "Oriental luxury" and arranged parties with women dancing with veils, who were allegedly then trafficked for prostitution via the white slave trade to the Russian Empire. He was a member of the club Enkan Bloms Bekanta (The Acquaintances of the Widow Blom), the club of the monarch's private circle, including among others Svante Hedin and Daniel Hwasser. According to a contemporary description, he was: "Insinuative, good-looking, small and dark, with burning eyes, extremely accommodating and polite to the ladies and keeps himself in the first line always".

In 1869, he unofficially represented Charles XV at the inauguration ceremony of the Suez Canal in Egypt. At this occasion he awarded several Swedish royal orders to important people in Egypt, such as the Order of the Sword to the mother of the khedive. He had the wish to achieve an alliance between Sweden and Egypt.

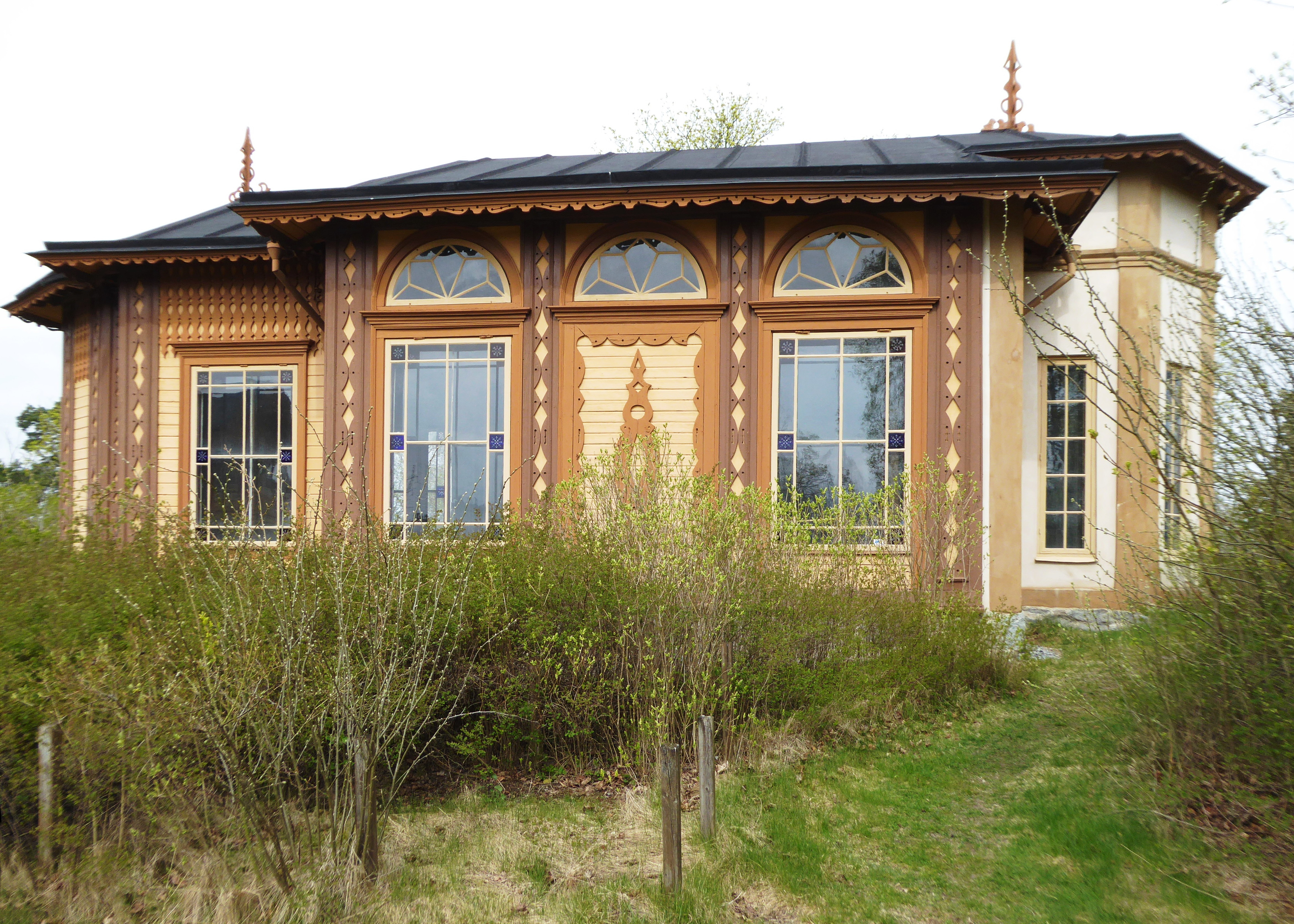
Ohan Demirgian had built an Armenian chapel in Sweden known as the Armeniska kapellet in Swedish.

After the death of the queen, Louise of the Netherlands, in 1871, he offered to manage the negotiations for the king's next marriage. It was reportedly Ohan Demirgian who suggested the Polish countess Graciosa Krasińska as candidate for the second marriage of Charles XV, rather than Thyra of Denmark or a Russian Grand Duchess. Krasińska, who was distantly related to the House of Savoy, was described as a young beauty and a millionaire after her father, was by then living in Paris with her mother and stepfather. Demirgian was to be given one million in provision for handling the negotiations in collaboration with the Ottoman ambassador in Paris. The plan was to give Krasińska the befitting status for a non-morganatic marriage by making her stepfather a Spanish grande through her relative, the Spanish monarch, and then award him with the title Royal Hignhess by the Italian monarch: thereby, Krasińska, would become Hr Royal Highness Princess Maria and acceptable as Queen of Sweden after marriage to Charles XV, with their potential son heir to the Swedish throne before the brother of Charles XV. These plans were not popular among the royal house nor with the Swedish government, and foreign minister Baltzar von Platen made preparations to prevent the marriage. The negotiations failed because of the sudden and unexpected death of the king in 1872.

Similarly, he offered to negotiate a new marriage for the widowed Princess Therese before she was placed under guardianship. During his last years, he made several attempts to blackmail the Swedish Royal House. He died at a mental hospital in Marseille, France in 1877.
