= Karasiński =

Karasiński (feminine: Karasińska) is a Polish surname. Notable people with the name include:

- Jerzy Karasiński (1942–2015), Polish footballer
- Katarzyna Karasińska (born 1982), Polish alpine skier
- Piotr Karasinski, Polish-American quantitative analyst
- Tomasz Karasiński (born 1973), Polish footballer

== Other ==
- Black–Karasinski model, financial mathematical model of the term structure of interest rates

== See also ==
- Krasiński
