= Leocadie Gerlach =

Danish-Swedish operatic mezzo-soprano

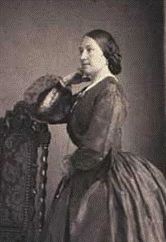
Leocadie Gerlach

Vilhelmine Leocadie Theresia Gerlach (née Bergnéhr; 26 January 1826 – 13 September 1919) was a Danish-Swedish mezzo-soprano opera singer who sang at the Royal Danish Theatre from 1845 to 1866. Considered to have been the country's most successful female singer of her day, she retired from the Royal Theatre while still young but continued to perform and give singing lessons at the Casino Theatre.

== Biography ==
Born in Stockholm in 1826, Leocadie Bergnéhr was the daughter of the Swedish customs inspector Carl Vilhelm Bergnéhr (1803–1847) and Charlotta Vilhelmina Christina Philp (1799–1871). She was the sister of the Swedish actress Zelma Hedin and the cousin of Laura Bergnéhr. In 1852, she married the customs official Carl Edvard Fossum. After a divorce in 1857, she married the singer Carl Ludvig Gerlach (1833–1893).

In February 1844, Bergnéhr made her début in Donaurum at the Mindre Teater in Stockholm, impressing the audience with the golden tones of her mezzo-soprano delivery. The Swedes suggested she should go to Paris for further training but she was encouraged by Jonas Collin to join the Royal Danish Theatre in Copenhagen where she could study under Henrik Rung. Later in 1845, she appeared as Filippo in Henrik Rung's operetta Aagerkarl og Sanger. She went on to play a wide variety of roles, including Therese in Friedrich Kuhlau's Røverborgen, Etle in Emil Hartmann's Liden Kirsten, the queen in Heinrich Marschner's Hans Heiling and Madam Voltisubito in J.L. Heiberg's Recensenten og Dyret.

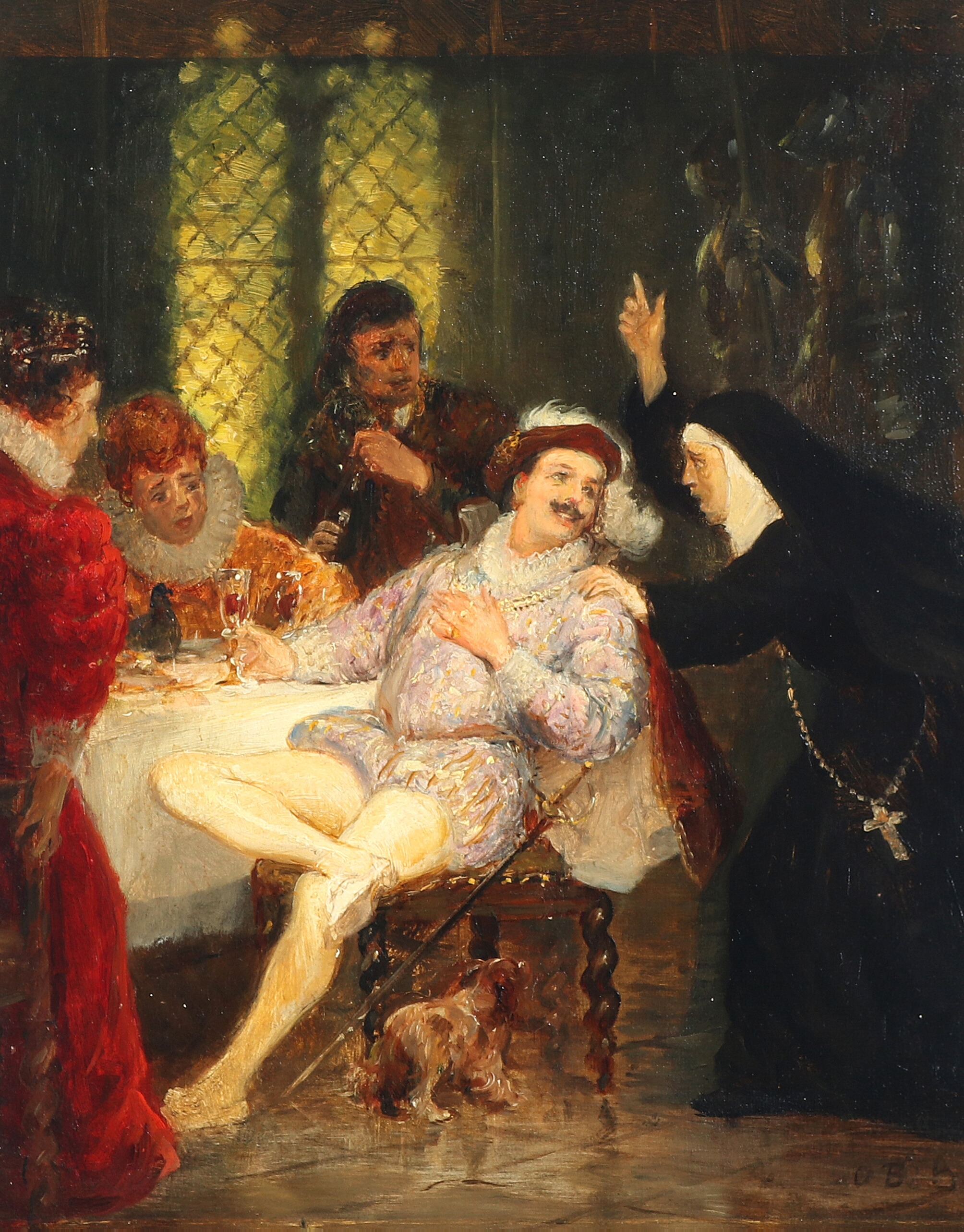
Otto Bache: Prima donna Leocadi Gerlach and chamberman Christian Hansen in “Don Juan.

In 1847, after she had performed with the German operatic soprano Wilhelmine Schröder-Devrient at the summer palace of Sanssouci, Bergnéhr received a travel grant which enabled her to spend a year in London studying under Manuel García. On her return to Copenhagen, she was given a permanent contract with the Royal Theatre. Heiberg commented that she had become "the glamorous centerpiece around whom all the other members of the opera congregated". Her roles in subsequent years included Vilhelmine in Édouard Du Puy's Youth and Folly, Anna in Mozart's Don Giovanni and Susanne in his Le nozze di Figaro.

In 1858, Leocadie Gerlach was elevated to the rank of Kongelig Kammersanger (Royal Chamber Singer) by King Frederick VII. Her last appearance was in November 1866 when she played her most successful part, the title role in Donizetti's Lucrezia Borgia. She left the Royal Theatre that year following a dispute with the administration, leaving her with only limited pension rights. As a result, she continued to sing in the Casino Theatre where she also taught young aspirants.

In 1872, she became a member of the Royal Swedish Academy of Music. While in Germany in 1873, she impressed Richard Wagner with her still powerful voice. For many years after her retirement, she continued to teach, also giving lessons at the Royal Danish Theatre.

Leocadie Gerlach died in Copenhagen in 1919, reaching the age of 93 and still in possession of all her faculties. She is buried in the crypt of Christian's Church in Christianshavn.
