= Carl Christoffer Gjörwell =

Swedish architect (1766–1837)

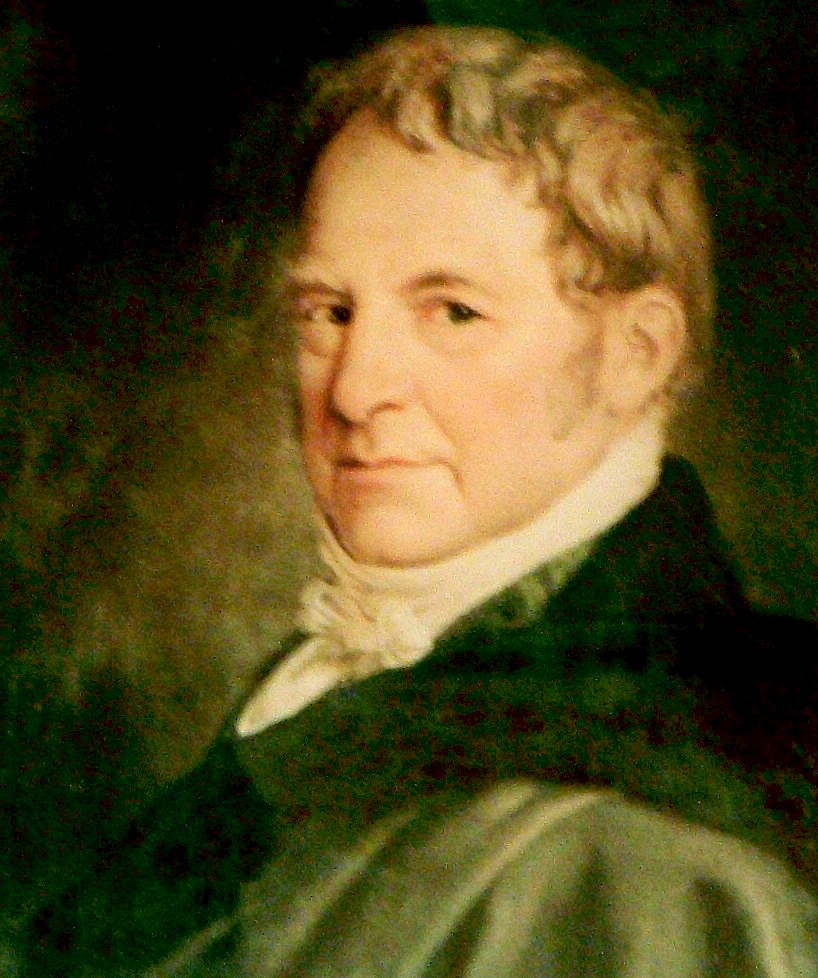
Carl Christoffer Gjörwell

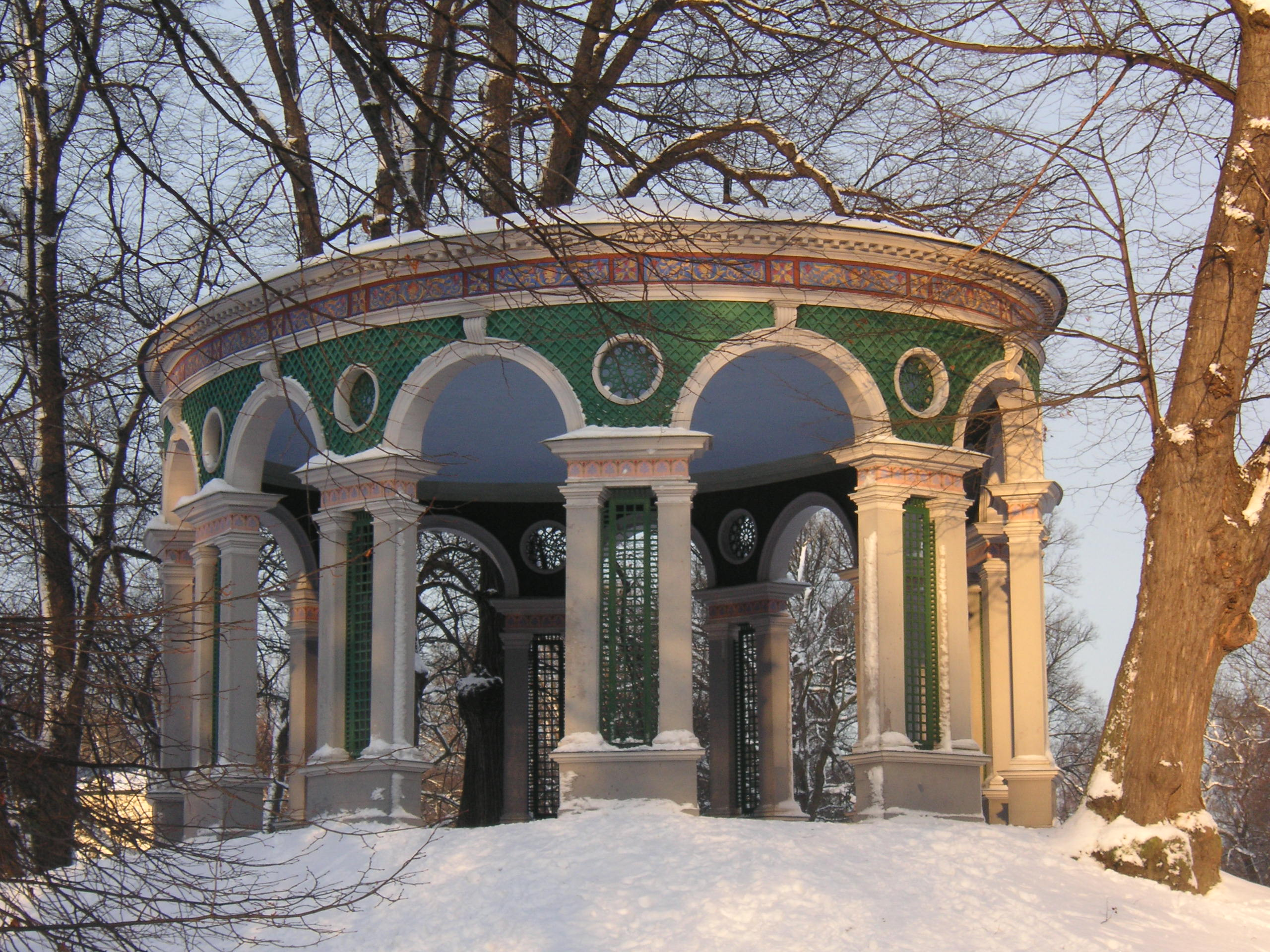
The Echo Temple at Haga is one of Gjörwell's better known works.

Carl Christoffer Gjörwell (the younger; 19 January 1766 – 14 November 1837) was a Swedish architect. He was a city architect in Stockholm, Sweden, between 1804 and 1837.

== Biography ==
Gjörwell was born in Stockholm, Sweden. He was the son of architect Carl Christoffer Gjörwell Sr. (1731–1811).

He attended the Royal Swedish Academy of Fine Arts and was hired in 1788 by painter and architect Louis Jean Desprez (c. 1743–1804). In 1794, he made a study trip to Rome. in 1796, he was employed as Deputy City Architect under Erik Palmstedt (1741–1803).

Some of his designs include the garrison hospital on Kungsholmen (Garnisonssjukhuset) completed in 1834, the main building of the Royal Academy of Turku built between 1802 and 1815 under the direction of Charles Bassi (1772–1840), the Old Academy Building in Turku consecrated in 1817 and the Haga Palace built between 1802 and 1805.
