= Hanna Styrell =

Swedish actress

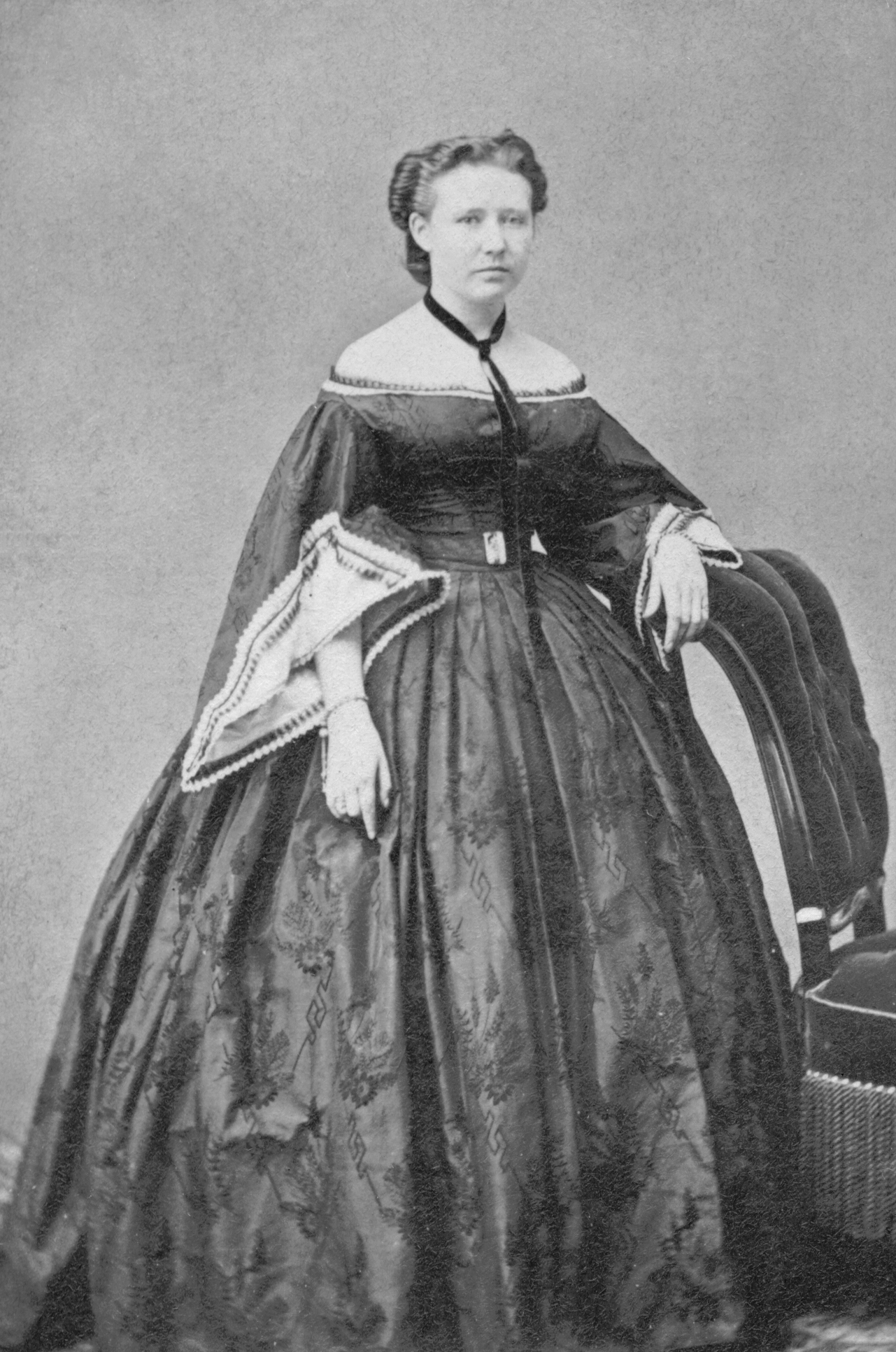
Hanna Styrell

Hanna Styrell (Stockholm, 21 January 1842 – 19 April 1904), was a Swedish actress. She is known as the royal mistress of King Charles XV of Sweden.

== Life ==
Styrell was the daughter of a baker in Stockholm. She became an actress at the age of seventeen, when she performed in the inauguration of the Odéon Theatre in 1859 under the name Hanna Stjernblad. Her acting career does not appear to have been significant as she is not mentioned much in theater history, and may have ended when she became the mistress of the king.

She suddenly appeared as the hostess on the King's country estate Bellevue in the summer of 1860. At the opening of parliament in 1862, a paper reported: "Among the public people, who was present at the act, a certain miss - blad was noticed, escorted by two uniformed butlers to the event." The "miss - blad" was Hanna, who used the name Stjernblad. As a royal mistress, she often lived on the estate Väntorp, a short distance from the royal Ulriksdal Palace. Väntorp was given to her in 1866, when she is noted to have become quite wealthy: she is listed with a fortune at that year. Her relationship with Charles continued until Charles' death in 1872. They visited Spa together (though they traveled there separately) during his illness the last year of his life.

She had one daughter with Charles: Ellen Maria (b. 1865), who became the foster child of Hanna's half-sister, Theresia. Theresia's husband was later made royal wallpaper master.

In 1876, she married the officer Adolf Tersmeden, who became a baron and a landlord upon his father's death. Hanna made many improvements to the estate, which was appreciated by the employees.

== See also ==
- Josephine Sparre
- Elise Hwasser
