= Princess Therese of Saxe-Altenburg =

Princess Therese
- Duchess of Dalarna
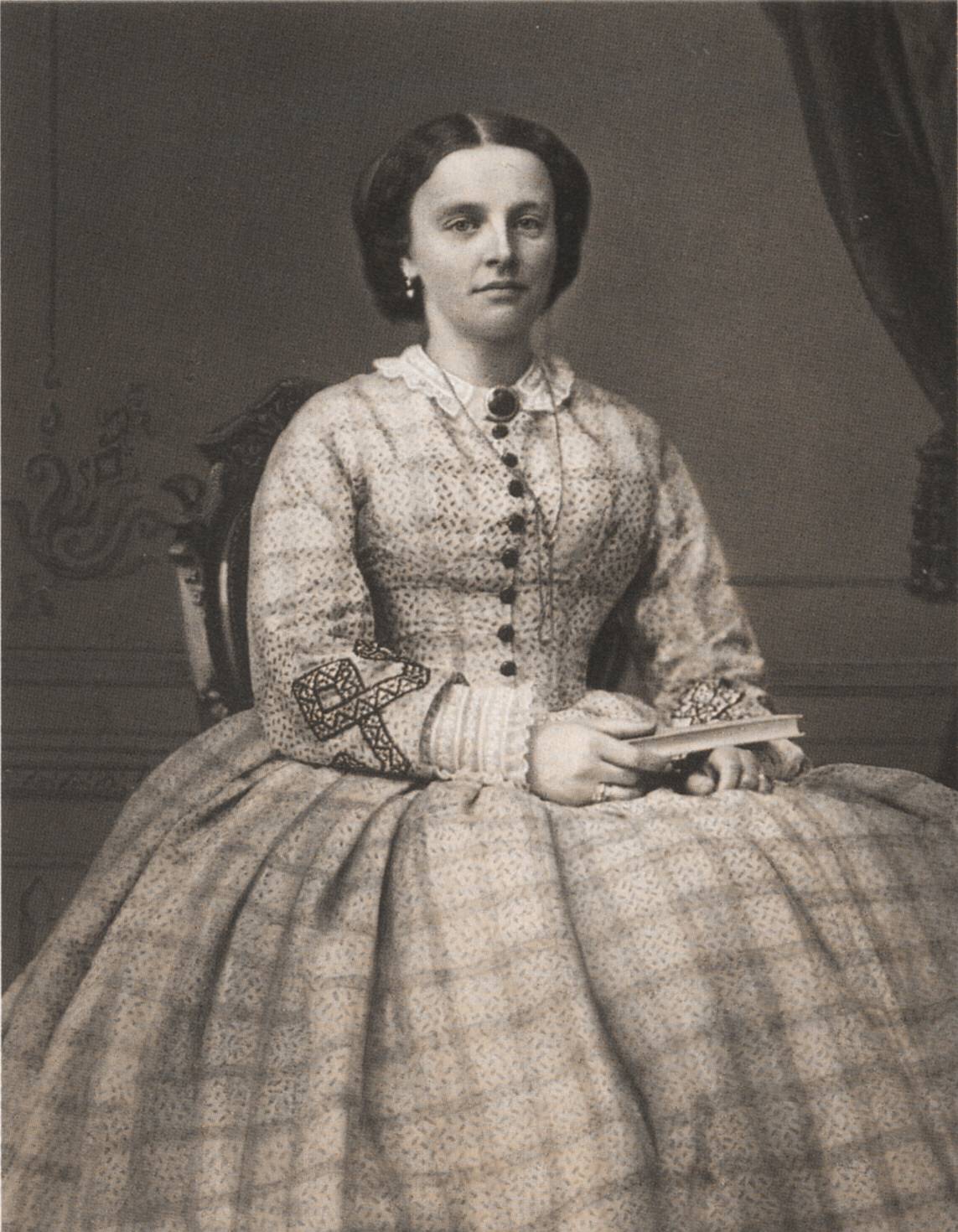
- Princess Therese in 1864
- Born: Princess Therese of Saxe-Altenburg; 21 December 1836; Ansbach, Bavaria, Germany
- Died: 9 November 1914 (aged 77); Haga Palace, Stockholm, Sweden
- Burial: 17 November 1914; Riddarholmen Church
- Spouse: Prince August, Duke of Dalarna (m. 1864; died 1873)
Names
- Therese Amalia Karolina Josefina Antoinetta
- House: Saxe-Altenburg
- Father: Prince Eduard of Saxe-Altenburg
- Mother: Princess Amalie of Hohenzollern-Sigmaringen

Princess Therese of Sweden and Norway, Duchess of Dalarna (born Princess Therese of Saxe-Altenburg; 21 December 1836 – 9 November 1914) was a Princess of Saxe-Altenburg by birth and a Princess of Sweden and Norway as the wife of Prince August, Duke of Dalarna. She was known in Sweden as Teresia.

== Early life ==
Born to Prince Eduard of Saxe-Altenburg and Princess Amalie of Hohenzollern-Sigmaringen, Thérèse spent her childhood in Bavaria. After her father's death in 1852, she lived with her cousin, Queen Marie of Hanover, and later with her maternal uncle, Karl Anton, Prince of Hohenzollern.

== Marriage ==
In 1864, Prince August of Sweden and Norway, Duke of Dalarna visited her in Düsseldorf, and after he had spent a week to get to know her, their engagement was announced. They were married on 16 April 1864 in Altenburg. She was then styled Princess of Sweden and Norway and Duchess of Dalecarlia (Dalarna).

In Sweden her name was Teresia (legal spelling from 1901). She has been described as small and frail in her appearance. Teresia and August were not romantically involved, but were good friends, and lived together harmoniously. They had no children. Teresia had mental problems and sometimes collapsed. August once said: "They call me stupid, but they should hear my Therese!" More affectionately, he also called her "my little Hopsy-Totsie" (Swedish: min lilla hoppetossa). She was a friend of her sister-in-law Eugenie, and visited her in Gotland during summers. She was interested in music and often present in a royal seat at the Royal Swedish Academy of Music.

== Widowhood ==
Widowed in 1873, she was given Louis De Geer as a guardian. During that time, she upheld a correspondence with Ohan Demirgian, a known Armenian con-artist with whom she made an acquaintance in 1869, when his presence at court caused a scandal. Demirgian was believed to have been a pimp, and now offered himself as her agent in negotiations for a new marriage. In 1875, Fritz von Dardel wrote: "The Duchess of Dalarna is now declared to be out of her senses by her relatives in Germany and at their request, she will remain in Switzerland over the winter to be treated by a doctor." She returned to Sweden in 1890, where she resided at Haga Palace. She was then commonly called "The Haga Duchess". She became known for her good kitchen, and ate so much that she was overweight with time. She died in 1914.
