= Krasiński Tenement =

Historic building in Warsaw, Poland

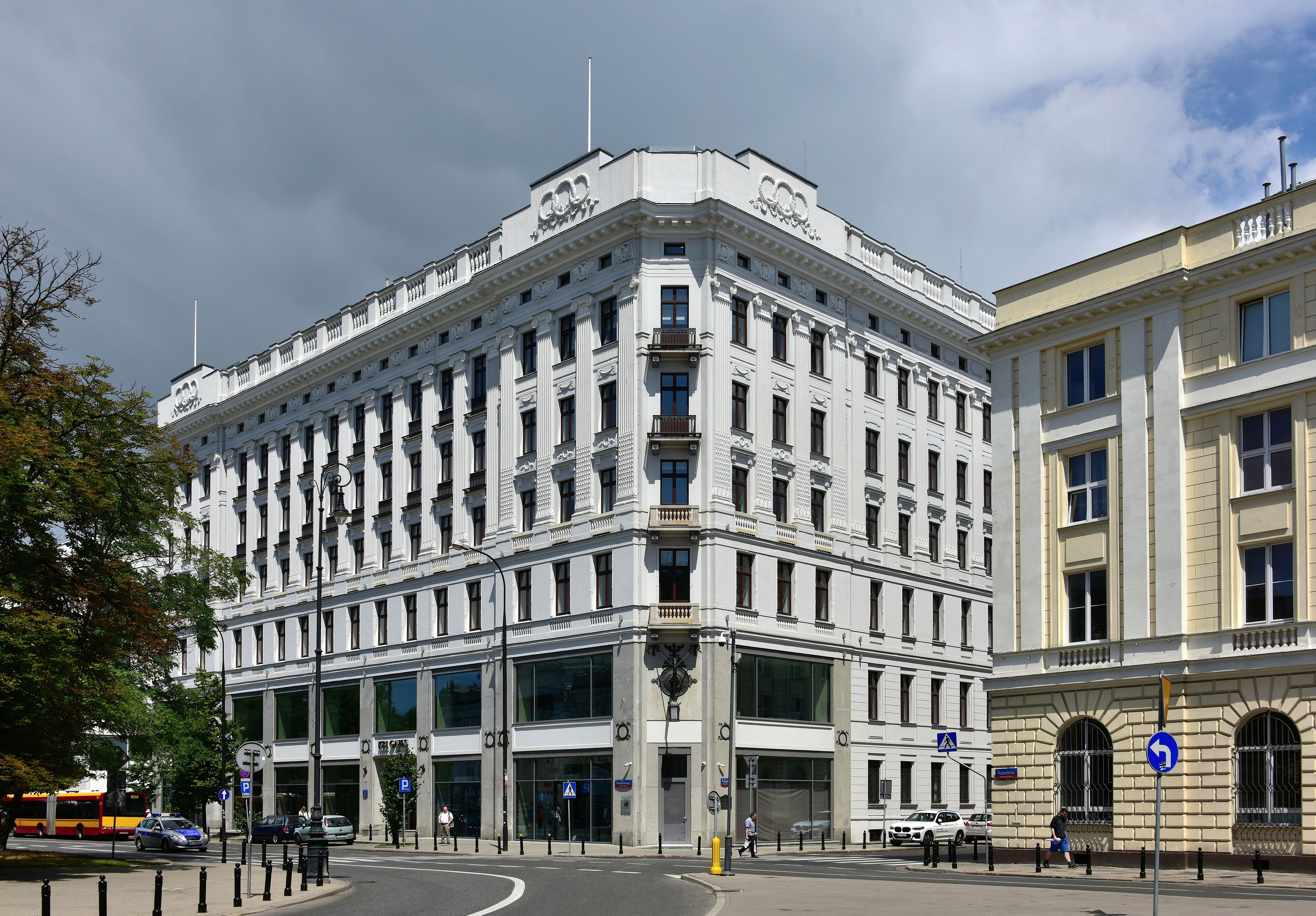
- The building in 2018.
- Interactive map of the Krasiński Tenement area

General information
- Type: Tenement, office building
- Architectural style: neoclassical, modernist
- Location: Downtown, Warsaw, Poland, 2 Małachowski Square
- Coordinates: 52°14′20.48″N 21°00′45.56″E
- Construction started: 1907
- Completed: 1910
- Owner: Kulczyk Silverstein Properties

Technical details
- Floor count: 7
- Floor area: 13,500 m²

Design and construction
- Architects: Jan Fryderyk Heurich (1910); Artur Goebel (1910); Bohdan Pniewski (1950)
- Architecture firm: Kana Architekci (2014)
- Developer: Krasiński family (1910); Hochtief Development Polska (2014); Kulczyk Silverstein Properties (2014)
- Main contractor: Warbud (2014)

The Krasiński Tenement, (Note: Polish pronunciation: [kraˈɕiɲ.ski]; Polish: Kamienica Krasińskich) also known as the Heurich Tenement, (Note: Polish pronunciation: [ˈxɛw.rix], German: [ˈhɔɪ̯.ʁɪç]; Polish: Kamienica Heurichowska) and the Raczyński Tenement, (Note: Polish pronunciation: [raˈt͡ʂɘ̟ɲ.ski]; Polish: Kamienica Raczyńskiego) is a historic seven-storey tenement house in Warsaw, Poland, located at 2 Małachowski Square, in the neighbourhood of North Downtown. It was designed by Jan Fryderyk Heurich and Artur Goebel, in neoclassical style, and constructed between 1907 and 1910, originally being used as a tenement house. It was destroyed during the Second World War, and rebuilt in 1950, serving as a headquarters of the Ministry of Post and Telegraphs, and Ministry of Communication. In 2014, it was renovated and turned into an office building. This includes construction of a new modernist wing.

== History ==
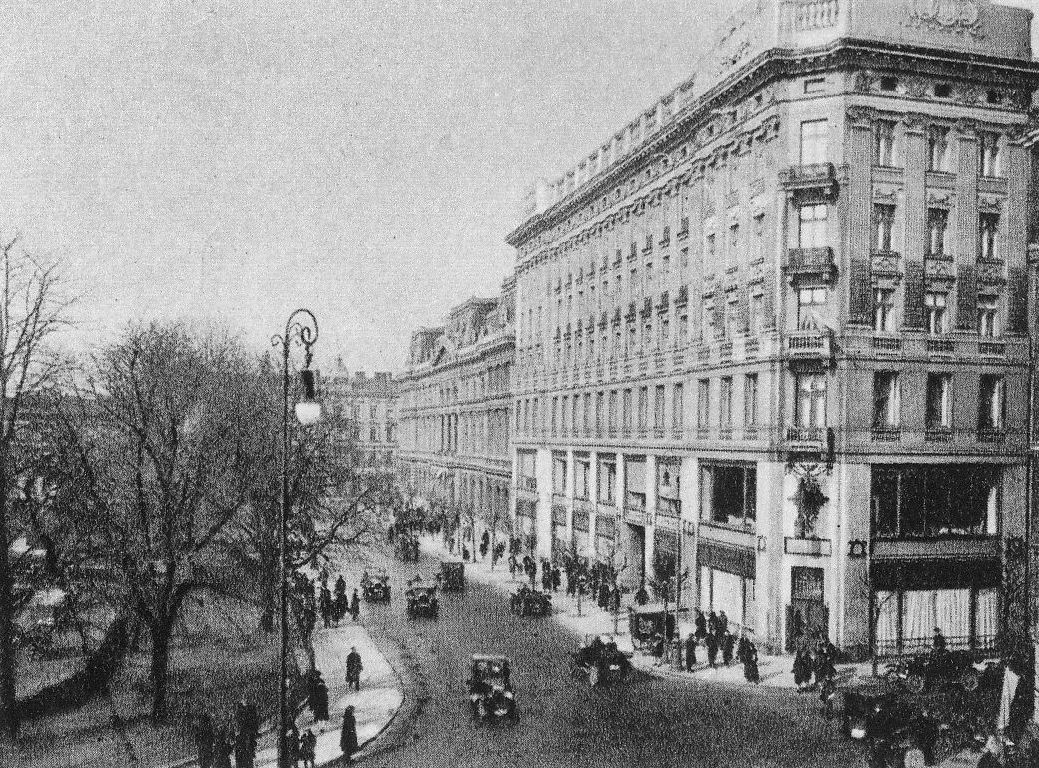
The Krasiński Tenement in 1939.

In place of the current building, in 1848 was constructed a tenement house for the Krasiński family. It was designed by architect Francesco Maria Lanci. It had three storeys.

Between 1868 and 1871 next to it was constructed much larger the Kronenberg Palace, as the residence for banker Leopold Stanisław Kronenberg, designed by Friedrich Hitzig.

To match their neighbour, at the beginning of the 20th century, Krasiński family decided to deconstruct and replace their residence with a representative building, that would house their family art and library collections. Architects Jan Fryderyk Heurich and Artur Goebel were commissioned for its design. While the building was still under construction, it was sold to Edward Aleksander Raczyński, whom turned it into a representative tenement house. It was constructed between 1907 and 1910, with seven storeys, making it taller than the Kronenberg Palace. The ground level consisted of the storefront.

In 1944, during the Second World War, it was set in fire and destroyed by German soldiers as part of operation which led to the destruction of Warsaw. It was rebuilt between 1949 and 1950, in accordance to project by Bohdan Pniewski. It became headquarters of the Ministry of Post and Telegraphs, which was replaced in 1955 by the Ministry of Communication. In 2001, its role was incorporated to the Ministry of Infrastructure, with headquarters in a different building. However, the tenement continued to be used as an office space of the ministry. Window grates at the ground level bear abbreviation of the prior Polish name, "MPiT", to the present day. During the reconstructed, a new wing was at Traugutta Street. Additionally, large storefront windows at the ground level were replaced with regular ones.

Its neoclassical architecture was used as an inspiration by the architects designing buildings at Constitution Square in Warsaw, constructed between 1950 and 1952.

In 1965, the tenement house, together with its garden and fence, was entered into the heritage list.

In 2008 the building bought by company Dom Development, which intended to refurbish it into a luxurious apartment building. However, the plan was not realised, and in 2011, it was sold for to Hochtief Development Polska, which later resold it to Kulczyk Silverstein Properties. In turn, it remodeled it into an office building. The tenement was renovated between 2012 and 2014, with a new modernist wing being added. It was designed by architecture firm Kana Architekci. During the construction, the large storefront windows at the ground level were restored.

== Characteristics ==
The building was designed as a tenement in neoclassical style. It has seven storeys and is decorated with a large attic. Its top storey has windows incorporated into a frieze, placed below the top cornice. Its ground level features a storefront with large windows. It also features an extension designed in modernist style. The building is currently used as an office space, with floor area of 13,500 m².
