= Carl Christoffer Gjörwell Sr. =

Swedish journalist

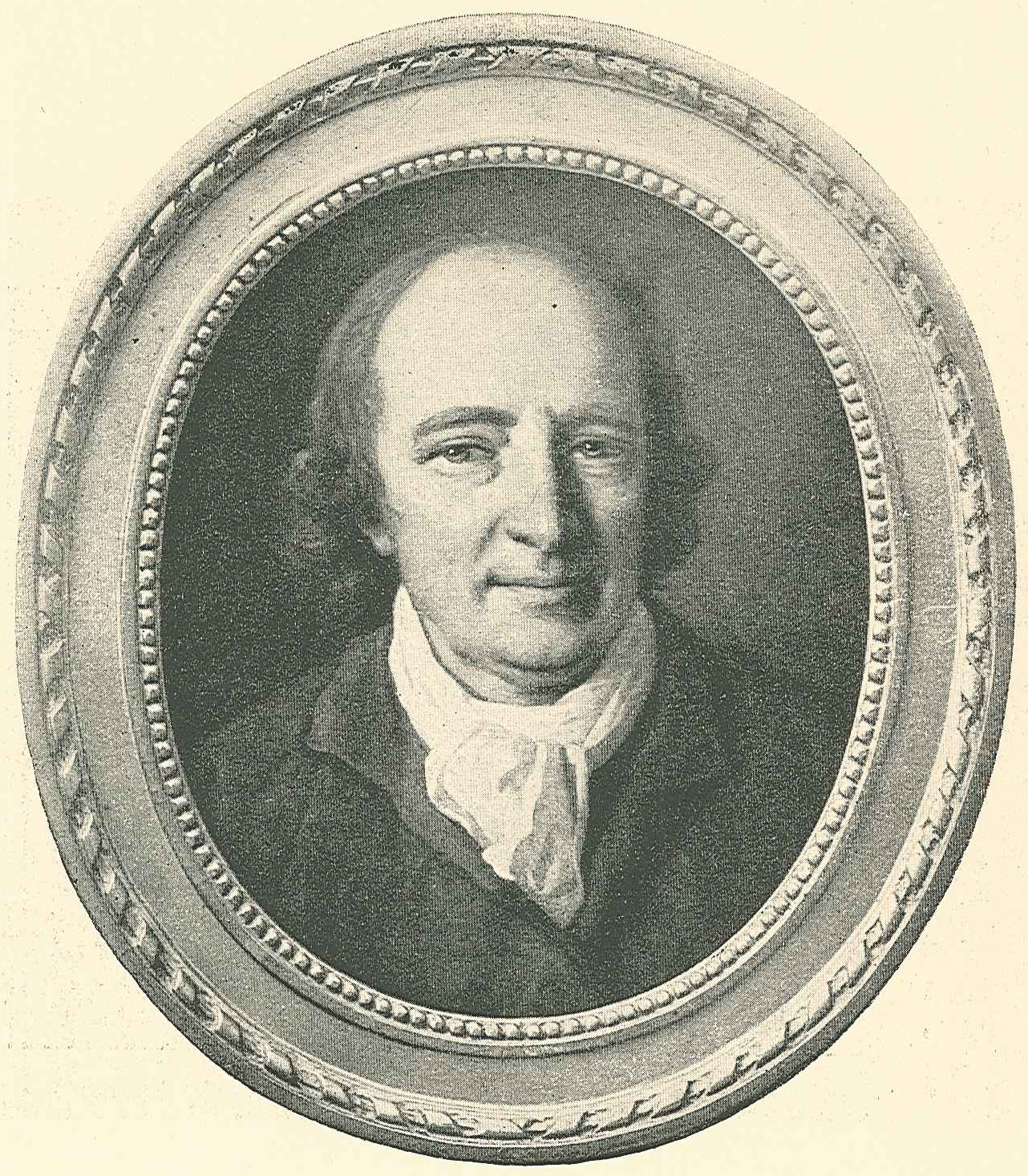
Carl Christoffer Gjörwell (the elder) as painted by Per Krafft the Elder.

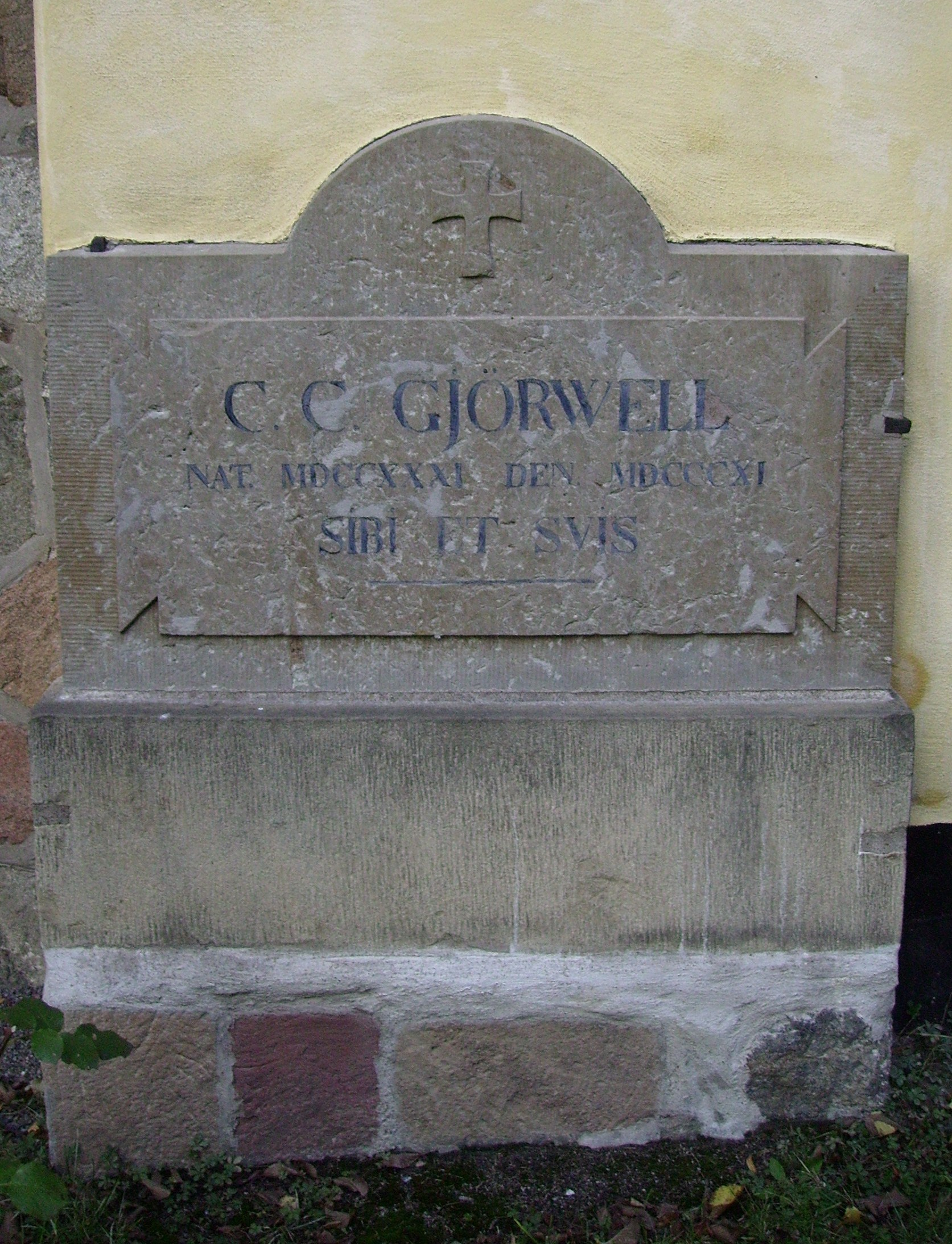
Gjörwell's gravestone in Solna cemetery

Carl Christoffer Gjörwell (the elder) (born 10 February 1731 in Landskrona, died 26 August 1811 in Stockholm), was a Swedish journalist, a prolific editor of some twenty journals and a psalmist whose hymns were published in the Moravian hymnal Sions Nya Sånger ("New songs of Zion") and elsewhere. His name is alternatively rendered as Carl Christoffersson Gjörwell, Carl Christopher Gjörwell or Karl Kristofer Gjörwell.

Gjörwell studied at Lund University and at Germany's University of Greifswald before coming to Stockholm to become a librarian at the National Library of Sweden.

== Early life and education ==
Gjörwell was an illegitimate son of lieutenant-colonel Christoffer Donatson Feif (b. 1694). Feif had been knighted by the new Queen Ulrika Eleonora in 1719 under the name Ehrensparre for his services in the Norwegian campaign of 1716-1718. He was the grandson of Scottish émigré merchant Donald Fyfe, who had set up business in Stockholm.

Enrolling at Lund University and still unacknowledged by Feif, he consulted with history professor Sven Lagerbring (1707–1787) about what name he should use. The professor replied: "It means little what name you choose. Do well (Swedish: Gjör well, with modern spelling gör väl) what you do, and you will have a good name." The young man liked the advice and, from those two words, devised his last name.

== Literary career ==
After a few years in Lund, he undertook (1750–51) a scientific expedition to the Netherlands and France, after which he initially wanted to go as a missionary to the Khoikhoi people of South Africa or to the Lenape Native Americans of Pennsylvania. Later he changed plans and in 1756 began service at the National Library of Sweden in Stockholm. From 1755 he was editor of Den Svenska Mercurius, the first significant Swedish journal of literary criticism.

Gjörwell married Brita-Nora Müllern in 1765, and they had a son and two daughters. The son was the architect Carl Christoffer Gjörwell Jr. (1766—1837). Daughter Britt-Louise married Krigskommissar (Colonel) Karl Gustaf Almqvist and was mother of Carl Jonas Love Almqvist. The second daughter, Gustava, married John Lindahl of Norrköping.

In 1772 Gjörwell had to cede control of his bookstore to his creditors over an unpaid debt of 140,000 daler. Probably it was the publishing enterprise, which was bound up with his bookselling business, that caused Gjörwell's catastrophe, but he nevertheless continued to work as the editor of journals and books. Gjörwell was chiefly occupied with history and literary history, and was especially taken with German literature. Despite changing public tastes, various twists of fate and whichever wandering turns his life took, he bore all reverses with stoic calm, happy in his family, his employment and his religious life in the prayer halls of the Moravian Herrnhut brethren.

Gjörwell died in 1811 and is buried at Solna Church.

== Bibliography ==
=== Edited and published by Gjörwell ===
- Den svenska Mercurius (1755–1761, 1763–1765).
- Lefvernesbeskrifningar och Caracterer om stora och namnkunniga människor (1755–56),
- Svenska Bibliotheket (5 volumes, 1757–1761),
- Kon. Gustaf Adolphs Tyska fälttåg (2 vols., 1759–61),
- Förråd eller Samling af historiska, moraliska och andra ämnen (2 vols., 1759–60),
- Nya Svenska Bibliotheket (2 vols., 1762–63),
- K. Bibliothekets Bibliothekets Tidningar om Lärda Saker (2 vols., 1768–69),
- Stats-Journal (5 vols., 1768–69),
- Svenske Anecdoter (4 vols., 1768–69),
- Allmänna Tidningar (4 vols., 1770–72),
- Politiske reflexioner. "öfwer rikens och folkslags styrelse och revolutioner, stigande och fall, nationela interessen m.m. hämtade utur så äldre som nyare, så in- som utländska historien; den upmärksame swenske medborgaren tilägade af några patriotiske granskare", Tidskrift, Stockholm: Wennberg och Nordström, 1771.
- Samlaren (9 vols., 1773–77),
- Historiske och Politiske Mercurius (7 Vols., 1774–78),
- Allmänna Bibliotheket (6 vols.,. 1776–78),
- Upfostringssälskapets Tidningar (1781–90),
- Historiskt Lexikon (3 vols., 1788–89), and
- Svenska Archivum (2 vols., 1790–93).
- Carl Christoffer Gjörwell Sr., Förtekning på alla de af trycket utgifne arbeten som blifvit författade, utgifne eller förlagde af Carl Christoffersson Gjörwell. Stockholm: Kumblinska boktryckeriet, 1804.
- Carl Christoffer Gjörwell Sr. and Arne Munthe, Carl Chr. Gjörwells brev till Fredrik Sparre 1768-1795, Stockholm: 1938, 321 pages.

=== Reviews and criticism ===
- Essayist Oscar Levertin compiled Bibliotekarien C. C. Gjörwells familjebref (1900), drawn from Gjörwell's voluminous correspondence and detailed diary entries.
- Gustaf Näsström, Gustaf, 1899–1979, Den gamle och graven: C. C. Gjörwell på Solna kyrkogård Solna: Hembygdsfören, 1975.
- Kent Zetterberg, "C. C. Gjörwell och Allmänna Tidningar" in Presshistorisk årsbok. Stockholm: Föreningen Pressarkivets vänner, 1989 (6), pp. 19–22. ISSN 0282-020X
- Jakob Christensson, "En upplysningstida encyklopedists uppgång och fall" in Lychnos. Uppsala: Lärdomshistoriska samfundet, 1993, pp. 109–149. ISSN 0076-1648
- Roger Jacobsson, Roger, "Diderot, Gjörwell och CD-ROM-skivan: om att vara modern" in Horisont. Vasa: Horisont, 1995 (42:2), pp. 63–68. ISSN 0439-5530
- Jakob Christensson, "Kärlek eller vänskap? En gustaviansk lexikografs slutgiltiga ståndpunkt" in Valborg Lindgärde and Elisabeth Mansén (eds.), Ljuva möten och ömma samtal. Stockholm: Atlantis, 1999. pp. 259–281. ISBN 91-7486-038-0
- Ingemar Oscarsson, "Svensk 1700-talsjournalistik på den europeiska arenan: Gjörwell som Sverigerapportör till utlandspressen" in Presshistorisk årsbok. Stockholm: Föreningen Pressarkivets vänner, 2001 (18), pp. 41–74. ISSN 0282-020X
- Hans Östman, "Några axplock ur Carl Christoffer Gjörwells korrespondens" in Personhistorisk tidskrif. Krylbo: Personhistoriska samfundet, 2001 (97:1), pp. 5–27. ISSN 0031-5699
- Ingemar Oscarsson, "Rikets frihet, borgerlig frihet, skrif-frihet: Gjörwell och den politiske Aristarchus 1769-72" (sic) in Marie-Christine Skuncke and Henrika Tandefelt (eds.), Riksdag, kaffehus och predikstol: frihetstidens politiska kultur 1766-1772. Stockholm: Atlantis, 2003. pp. 315–338. 432 pages. ISBN 91-7486-771-7

=== Hymns ===
- "Herde, du som fåren betar" ("Shepherd, you who graze the sheep") in Sions Nya Sånger 7th ed., 1870, No 124.
