= Prins August =

Swedish steam locomotive

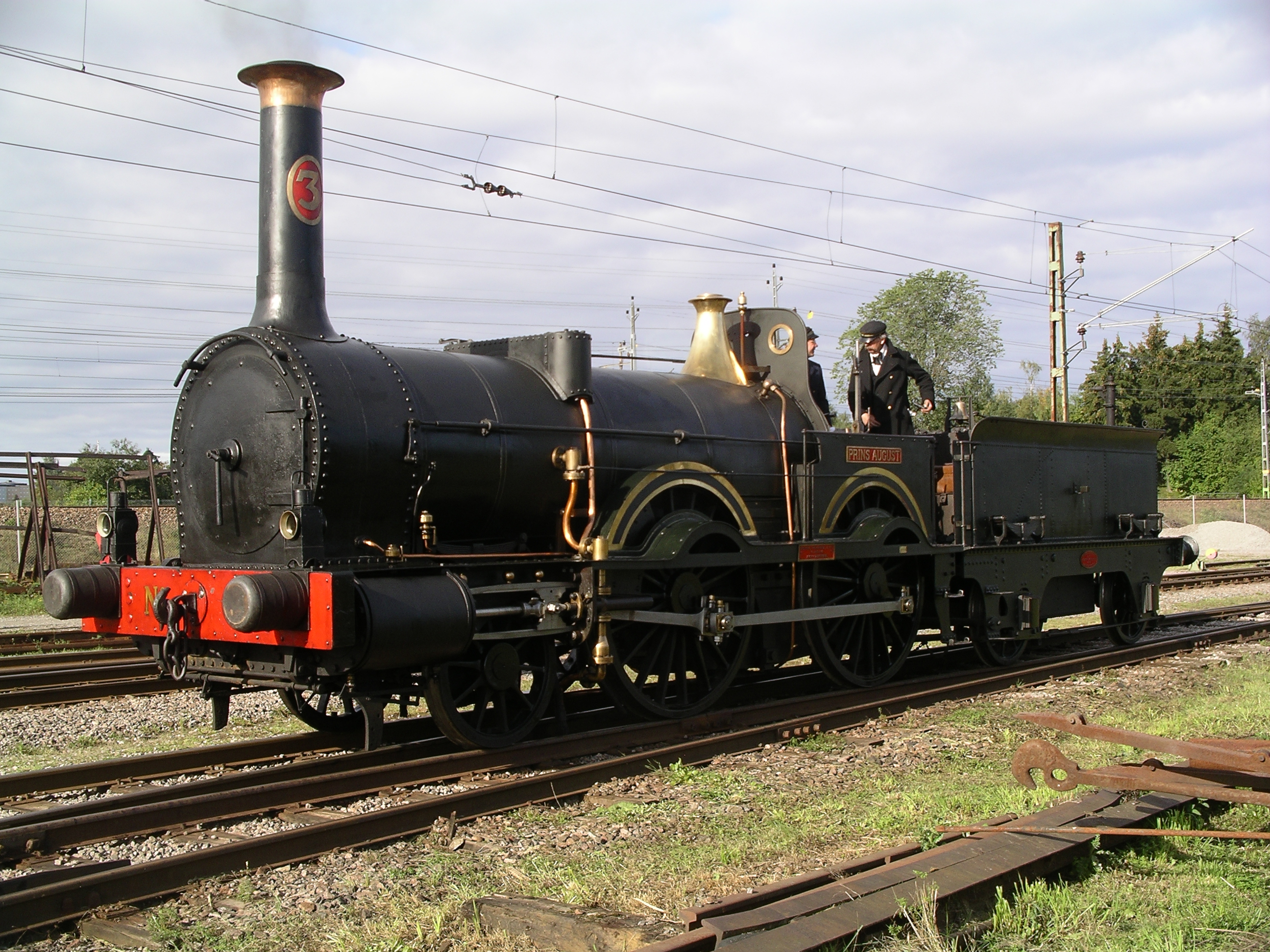
- Prins August in 2006
Type and origin
- Power type: Steam
- Builder: Beyer, Peacock & Company
- Serial number: 33
- Build date: 1856
Specifications
- Configuration
  - Whyte: 2-4-0
- Gauge: 1,435 mm (4 ft 8 1/2 in) standard gauge
- Length: 12.714 m (41 ft 8.6 in)
- Fuel type: Coal and water
Performance figures
- Maximum speed: 75 km/h (47 mph)
Career
- Operators: Swedish State Railways
- Class: B
- Official name: Prins August
- Last run: 1906
- Disposition: Preserved Swedish Railway Museum

The Prins August is a preserved Swedish steam locomotive, built in 1856 by Beyer, Peacock & Company in Manchester, England. It is the world's oldest operating standard gauge steam locomotive, and one of the world's oldest operating steam locomotives overall, currently in the collection of the Swedish Railway Museum.

The name of the locomotive honors Prince August, Duke of Dalarna, who was fond of railways.

== In Service ==
The locomotive is one of 45 B class types built for service on the Southern Main Line and the Western Main Line, used in mixed freight and passenger service by the Swedish State Railways (SSR).

This type was the SSR's first locomotive, originally built for passenger service. The units arrived from England without a cab and were capable of 75 km/h (47 mph) in service.

== Preservation ==
The locomotive was taken out of service in 1906 and preserved as a museum object. Kept at the Swedish Railway Museum, it is occasionally used for excursion service, as happened in 2006 for the 150th anniversary celebration of the Malmö–Lund rail line.
