= Old Academy Building =

Coordinates: 60.4517°N 22.2797°E

- Akatemiatalo/Akademihuset
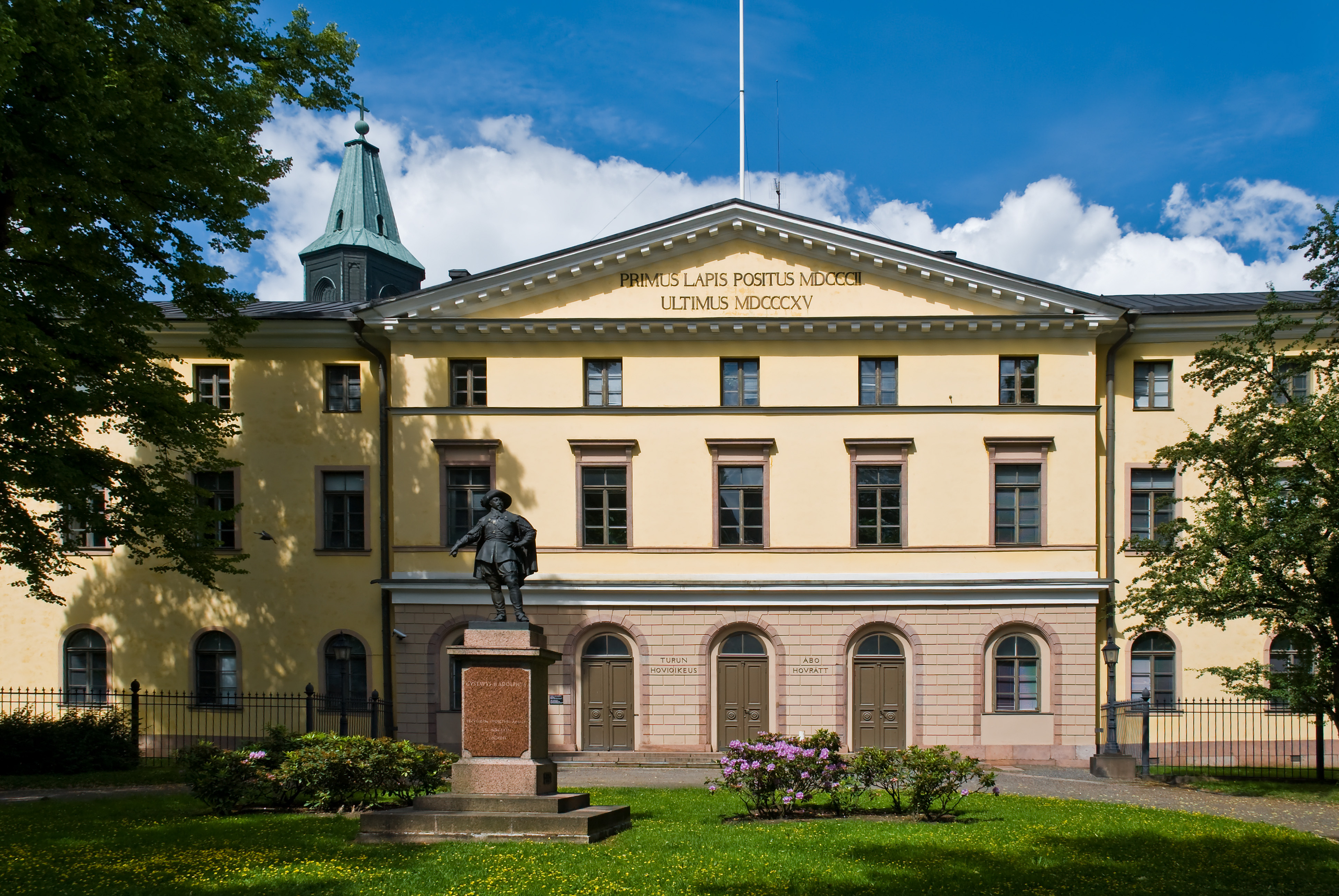
- The Court of Appeal side of the Old Academy Building in Turku,
- Interactive map of the Old Academy Building area

General information
- Architectural style: Neoclassic
- Location: Turku, Finland, Rothoviuksenkatu 2
- Construction started: 1802
- Completed: 1815
- Inaugurated: 1817
- Renovated: 1830

Design and construction
- Architect: Carl Christoffer Gjörwell

The Old Academy Building (Finnish: Akatemiatalo, Swedish: Akademihuset) is a neoclassical building, originally consecrated in 1817 for the Royal Academy of Turku in Turku, Finland. It is located in Cathedral Square next to Turku Cathedral. The building was designed by Swedish architect Carl Christoffer Gjörwell.

Laying down the foundation stone of the Old Academy Building in 1802 was a milestone where Swedish king Gustav IV Adolf and Queen Fredrika Dorotea were present. The Old Academy Building suffered damage due to the Great Fire of Turku in 1827. After the devastation caused by the fire, the Imperial Academy of Turku, the university at that time, moved to Helsinki. However, the building was restored under Carl Ludvig Engel's plans in 1830 and was signed over to the Court of Appeals of Turku, Turku Cathedral chapter and the County Administrative Board. Today, the spaces are used for the Court of Appeal, with the exception of the Ceremonial Hall, which is managed by the University of Turku where its Faculty of Humanities graduation ceremony take place. The hall is used for the two universities in Turku: the University of Turku and Åbo Akademi University. It seats 350 and is also commonly used for events such as concerts; the acoustics of the hall are superb for choirs and chamber music.

== Gallery ==
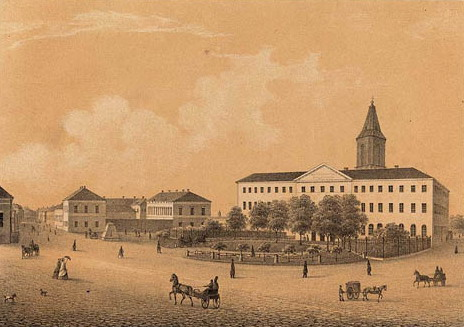
Old Academy Building (19th century).

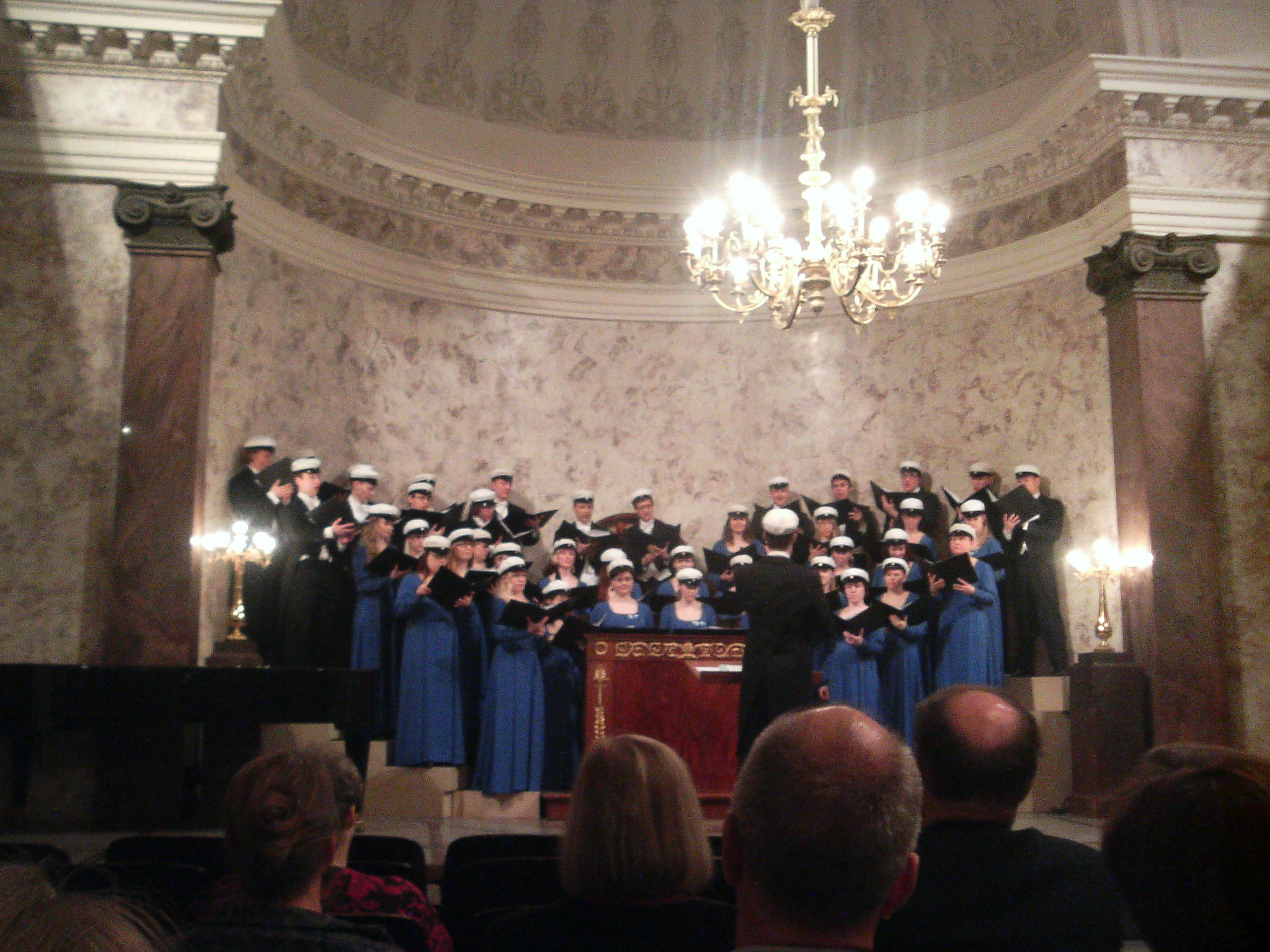
The Student Union Choir of the University of Turku performing in the Cerermonial Hall.
