= Elżbieta Jaraczewska =

Polish writer and children's author (1791-1832)

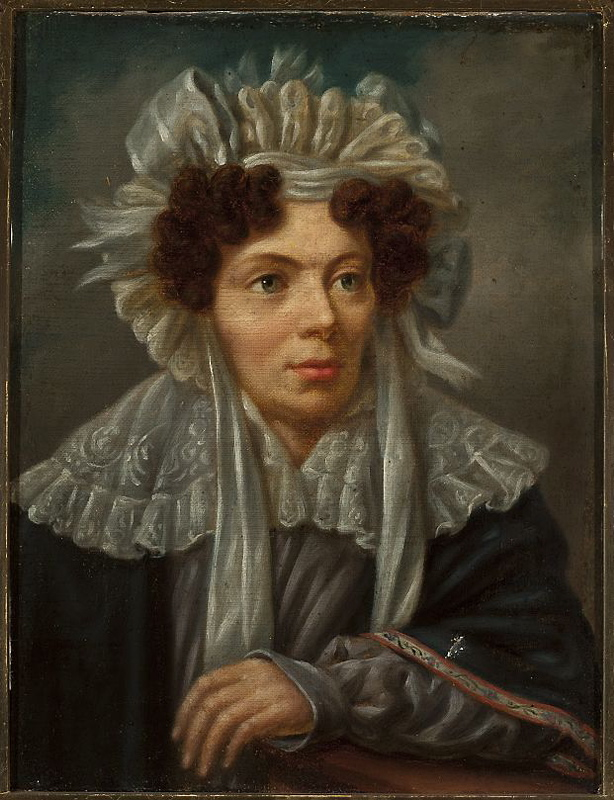
Elżbieta Krasińska-Jaraczewska

Elżbieta Jaraczewska (1791-1832) was a Polish writer. She published novels, plays and morality stories for children.

== Selected works ==
- Zofia i Emilia. Powieść narodowa, oryginalnie przez Polkę napisana, t. 1–2, Warszawa 1827; wyd. następne: zobacz Wydania zbiorowe; Bruksela 1862, Biblioteka Domowa, nr 31; Warszawa 1957
- Wieczór adwentowy. Powieść narodowa, przez autorkę "Zofii i Emilii", t. 1–2, Warszawa 1828; wyd. następne: zobacz Wydania zbiorowe; Bruksela 1862, Biblioteka Domowa, nr 32; Tarnów 1890
- Upominek dla dzieci, czyli krótkie powieści moralne, przez autorkę "Zofii i Emilii", Warszawa 1828; wyd. następne: Powieści krótkie, moralne dla dzieci, Warszawa 1842
- Pierwsza młodość, pierwsze uczucia. Powieść narodowa przez autorkę "Zofii i Emilii", t. 1–4, Warszawa 1829; wyd. następne: zobacz Wydania zbiorowe; Bruksela 1862, Biblioteka Domowa, nr 33–34; fragmenty przedr. M. Piszczkowski w: Obrońcy chłopów w literaturze polskiej, cz. 2, Kraków 1948, s. 55–58.

== Sources ==
- T. 5: Oświecenie. W: Bibliografia Literatury Polskiej – Nowy Korbut. Warszawa: Państwowy Instytut Wydawniczy, 1967, s. 21–22.
