= Marya Krasińska =

Polish noblewoman

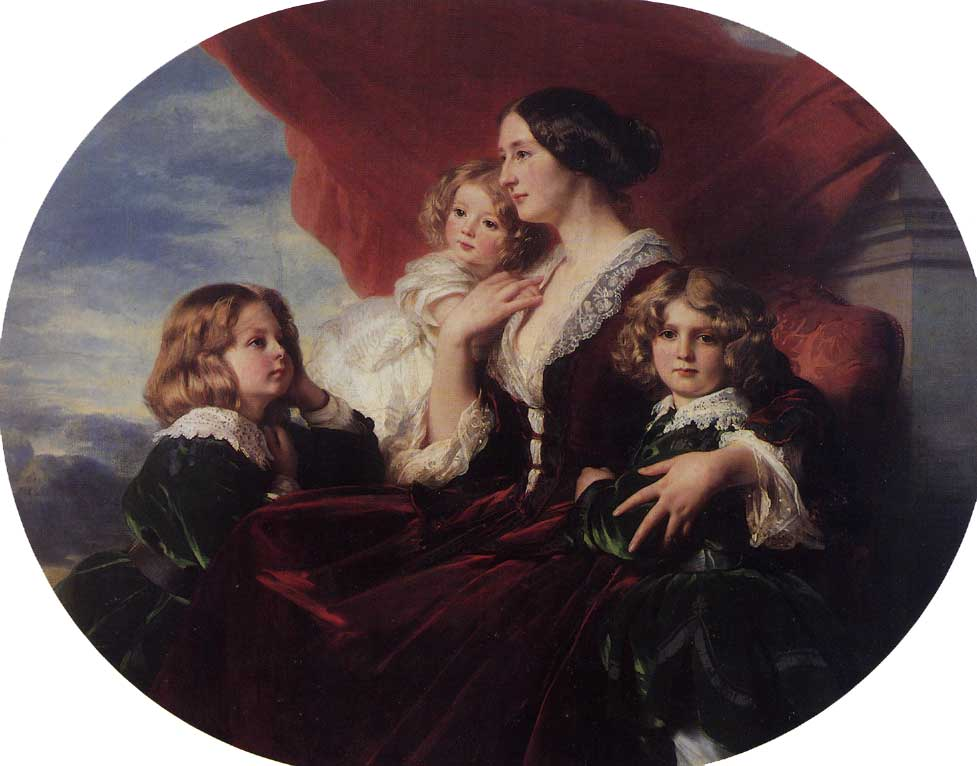
Maria Beatrix Krasińska as a child with her mother, Eliza Krasińska née Branicka.

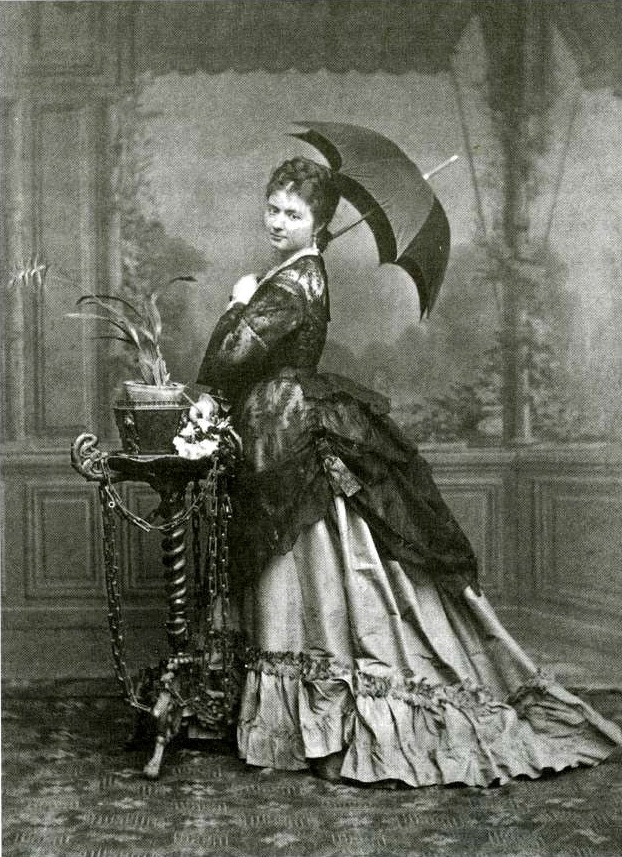
Photo of Countess Maria Beatrix Krasińska

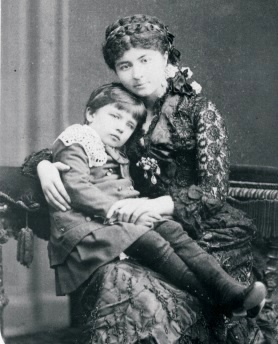
Maria Beatrix with her son, Count Karl Roger Raczynski

Graciosa Maria "Marya" Krasińska, or Maria Beatrix Krasińska (born in Warsaw, July 24, 1850, or 1854 - August 24, 1884), was a Polish noblewoman, aristocrat and a landowner. She is known as the controversial marriage candidate of King Charles XV of Sweden in 1871–1872.

== Life ==
By birth, she was member of House of Krasiński as the daughter of the Polish poet Count Zygmunt Krasinski (d. 1859), and Countess Eliza Branicka. Through her father, she was related to the Radziwill family, as well as the royal family of Italy: the House of Savoy. After the death of her father, she inherited a vast fortune and moved to Paris with her mother and stepfather, Count Ludwik Krasinski. Maria was owner of the Złoty Potok estates.

=== Suggested Royal marriage ===
It was reportedly Ohan Demirgian who suggested the Polish countess Graciosa Krasińska, rather than Thyra of Denmark or a Russian Grand Duchess, as candidate for the second marriage of Charles XV after the death of the queen, Louise of the Netherlands, in 1871. Charles XV stated, that he would remarry because it would make it possible to produce a male heir to the throne, and the fortune of the bride would be of great help to the finances. To the argument that Krasińska was not royal, he replied that it was only princes, not the monarchs themselves, who were banned from marrying non-royals - and in any case, he would have her relative, the king of Italy, to give her royal status by adopting her.

Krasińska, who was distantly related to the House of Savoy, was described as a young beauty and a millionaire after her father, was by then living in Paris with her mother and stepfather. Demirgian was to be given one million in provision for handling the negotiations in collaboration with the Ottoman ambassador in Paris, Yousouf Nabaraony Bey. The plan was to give Krasińska the befitting status for a non-morganatic marriage by making her stepfather a Spanish grande through her relative, the Spanish monarch, and then award him with the title Royal Hignhess by the Italian monarch: thereby, Krasińska, would become Her Royal Highness Princess Maria and acceptable as Queen of Sweden after marriage to Charles XV, with their potential son heir to the Swedish throne before the brother of Charles XV.

These plans were not popular among the royal house nor with the Swedish government. Foreign minister Baltzar von Platen made preparations to prevent the marriage, the attaché of the Swedish legation in Turin worked to prevent the Italian king from getting involved, and the king's mother, Josephine of Leuchtenberg, visited the Spanish royal couple in Madrid to ask them to speak to the Italian king to prevent his adoption of Krasinska.

In the spring of 1872, Charles XV was ready to travel to Switzerland to meet her, and had already appointed his retinue. The plans failed because of the death of the king in 1872.

=== Personal life ===
Countess Marya Krasińska married Count Edward Aleksander Raczyński on April 9, 1877. They had one son:

- Count Karl Roger Raczynski (1878 - 1946), married Princess Stephanie Sviatopolk-Czetwertynska (1879 - Abt 1945) and had issue

== Death ==
Countess Marya died on August 24, 1884, in Trento, Kingdom of Italy, aged 34.
