= Krasinsky, Volgograd Oblast =

Krasinsky Красинский
- Khutor
- Location within Volgograd Oblast Location within Russia
- Coordinates: 50°08′N 42°22′E
- Country: Russia
- Region: Volgograd Oblast
- District: Alexeyevsky District
- Time zone: UTC+4:00

Krasinsky (Russian: Красинский) is a rural locality (a khutor) in Solontsovskoye Rural Settlement, Alexeyevsky District, Volgograd Oblast, Russia. The population was 42 as of 2010.

== Geography ==
Krasinsky is located 25 km southeast of Alexeyevskaya (the district's administrative centre) by road. Solontsovsky is the nearest rural locality.
