= Charles XV =

King of Sweden and Norway from 1859 to 1872

Charles XV and IV
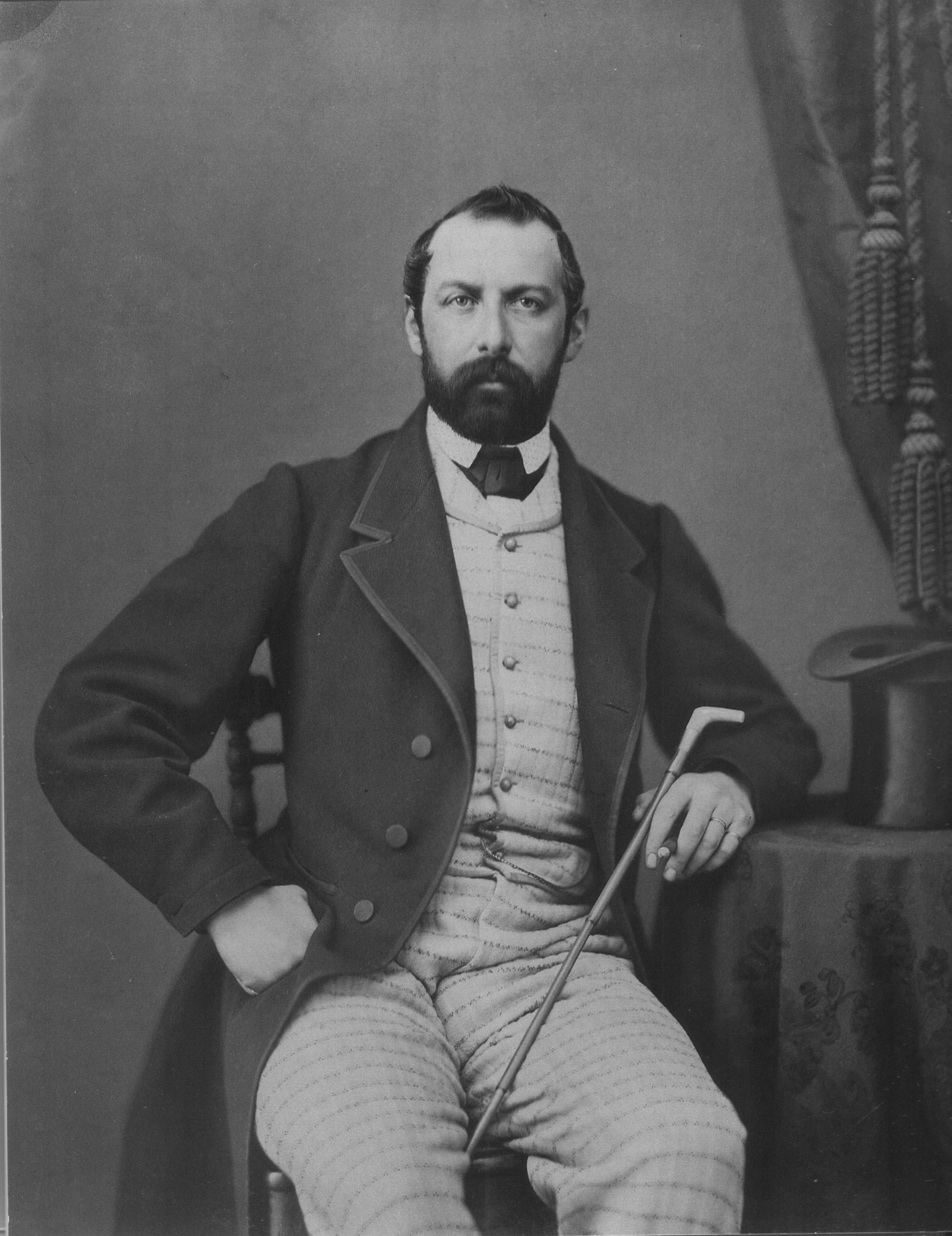
- Formal portrait, 1865

King of Sweden and Norway
- Reign: 8 July 1859 – 18 September 1872
- Coronation: 3 May 1860, Stockholm; 5 August 1860, Trondheim
- Predecessor: Oscar I
- Successor: Oscar II
- Born: 3 May 1826; Stockholm, Sweden
- Died: 18 September 1872 (aged 46); Malmö, Sweden
- Burial: 9 October 1872; Riddarholmskyrkan
- Spouse: Louise of the Netherlands (m. 1850; died 1871)
- Issue: Louise, Queen of Denmark; Prince Carl Oscar, Duke of Södermanland
Names
- Carl Ludvig Eugen
- House: Bernadotte
- Father: Oscar I of Sweden
- Mother: Josephine of Leuchtenberg
- Religion: Church of Sweden
- Education: Uppsala University

Charles XV and IV (Carl Ludvig Eugen; 3 May 1826 – 18 September 1872) was King of Sweden as Charles XV (Swedish: Karl XV) and King of Norway as Charles IV (Norwegian: Carl IV) from 1859 until his death in 1872. Charles was the third Swedish monarch from the House of Bernadotte. He was the first one to be born in Sweden, the first to grow up speaking Swedish as his first language, and the first to be raised from birth in the Lutheran faith.

== Biography ==
=== Early life ===
Crown Princess Josephine with her eldest son, Prince Charles

He was born in Stockholm Palace, Stockholm, in 1826 and dubbed Duke of Scania at birth. Born the eldest son of Crown Prince Oscar of Sweden and his wife Crown Princess Josephine, he would be second in line to the throne of his grandfather, the ruling King Charles XIV John. During his childhood he was placed in the care of the royal governess, Countess Christina Ulrika Taube. When he was 15, he was given his first officer's commission in 1841 by his grandfather the king.

=== Crown Prince ===
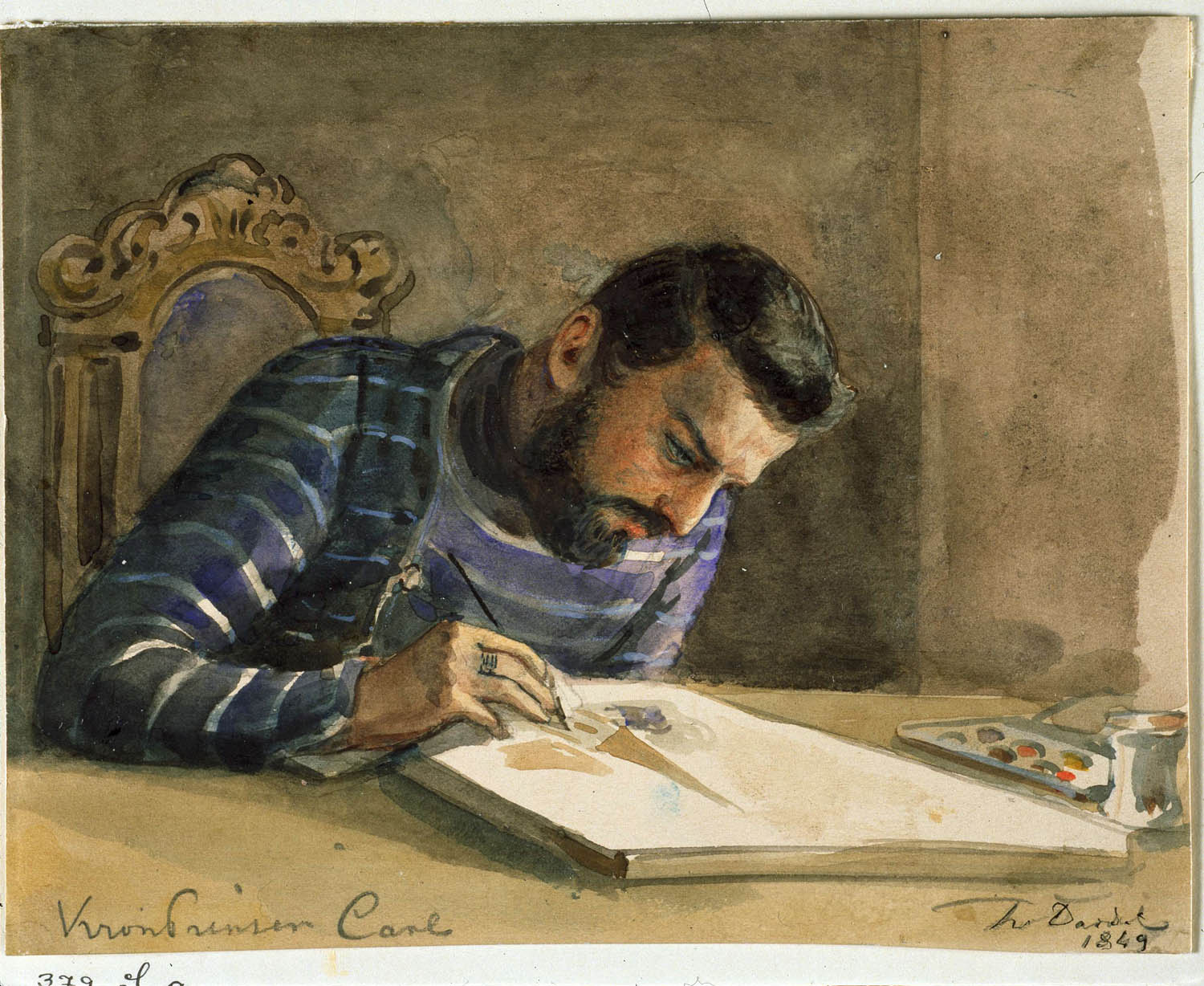
Crown Prince Charles, watercolor by Fritz von Dardel, 1849.

The aging King Charles XIV John would suffer a stroke on his 81st birthday in 1844, dying little more than a month later. Charles's father Oscar ascended the throne as King Oscar I of Sweden and Norway. Crown Prince Charles was made a chancellor of the universities of Uppsala and Lund, and in 1853 chancellor of Royal Swedish Academy of Arts. On 11 February 1846, he was made an honorary member of the Royal Swedish Academy of Sciences.

The Crown Prince was Viceroy of Norway briefly in 1856 and 1857. He became Regent on 25 September 1857, and king on the death of his father on 8 July 1859. As grandson of Augusta of Bavaria, he was a descendant of Gustav I of Sweden and Charles IX of Sweden, whose Vasa blood returned to the throne after being lost in 1818 when Charles XIII died.

On 19 June 1850, he married in Stockholm Louise of the Netherlands, niece of William II of the Netherlands through her father and niece of Frederick William IV of Prussia through her mother. The couple was personally quite dissimilar; Louise was a cultured and refined woman, however, she was considered to be quite plain and Charles was disappointed with her appearance. Louise was in love with her husband, whereas he preferred other women, saddening her deeply. His well-known mistresses included the actress Laura Bergnéhr, the countess Josephine Sparre, Wilhelmine Schröder and the actresses Hanna Styrell and Elise Hwasser, and the Crown Prince neglected his shy wife. On the other hand, his relationship to his only daughter, Louise, was warm and close.

=== Reign ===
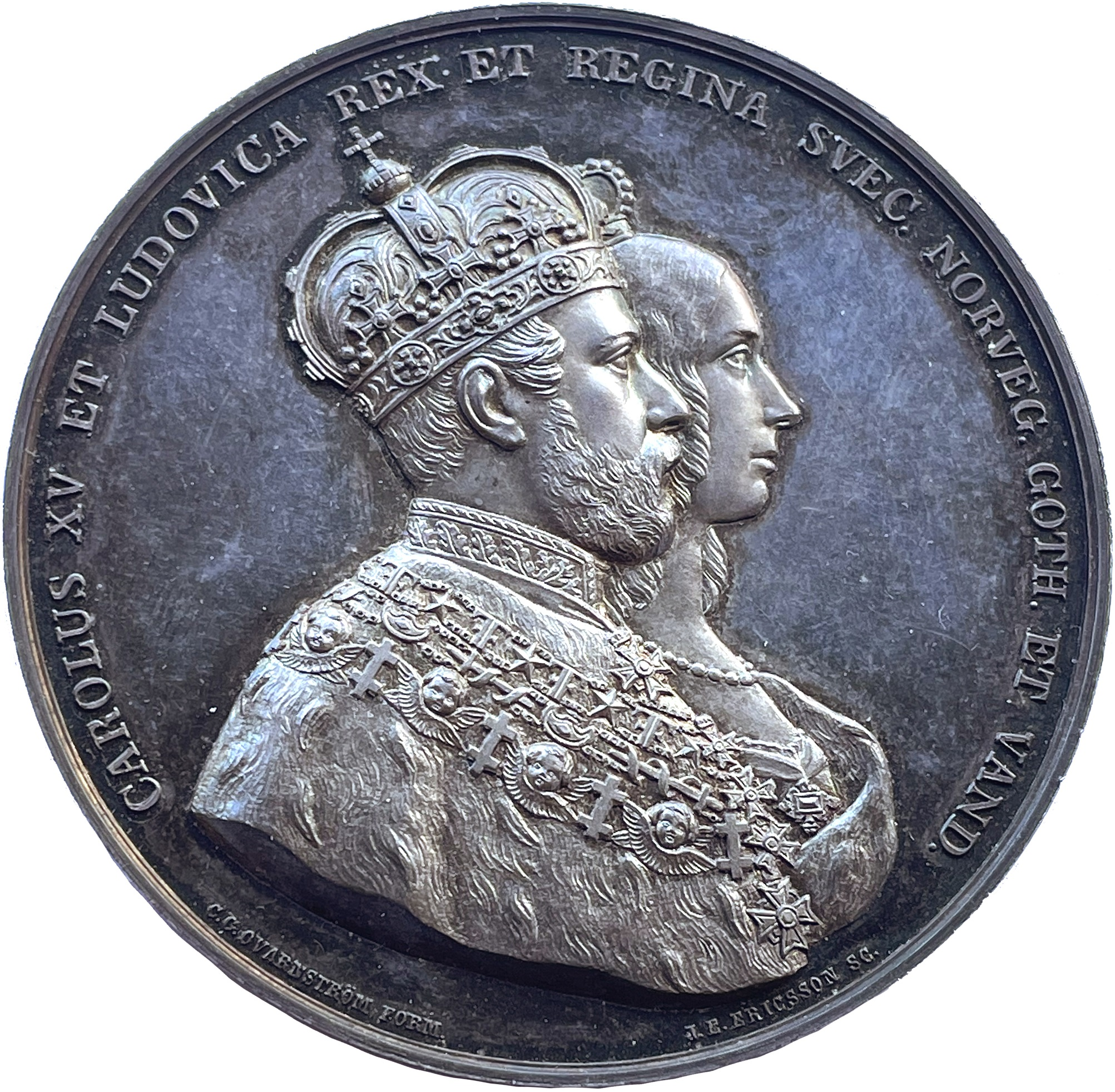
Coronation medal for Charles and Louise 1860

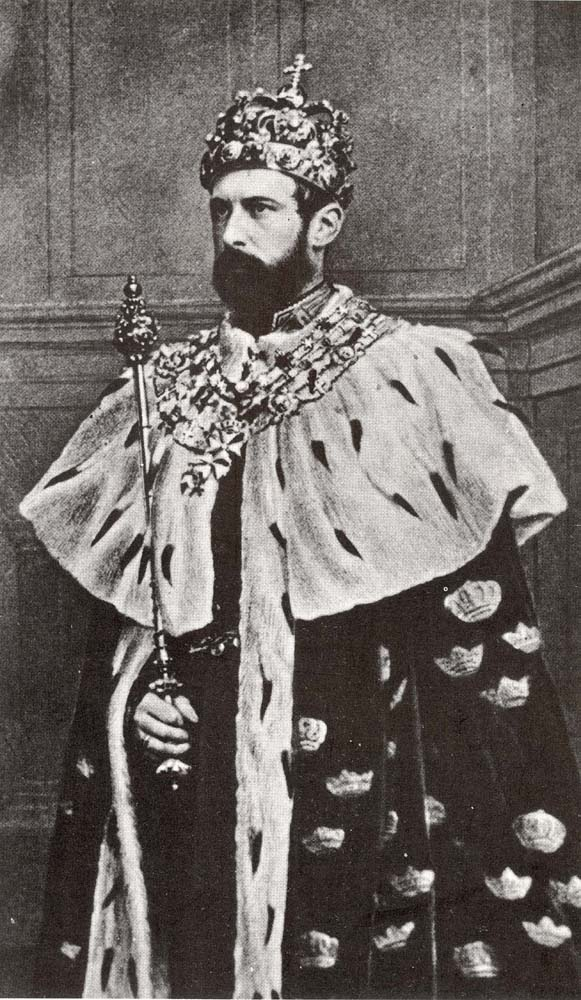
Photograph of Charles XV in coronation robes

As Crown Prince, Charles's brusque manner had led many to regard his future accession with some apprehension, yet he proved to be one of the most popular of Scandinavian kings and a well-respected follower of the constitution. His reign was appreciated for its manifold and far-reaching reforms. Sweden's existing municipal law (1862), ecclesiastical law (1863) and criminal law (1864) were enacted appropriately enough under the direction of a king whose motto was: Land skall med lag byggas – "With law shall the land be built". Charles also helped Louis De Geer to carry through his reform of the Parliament of Sweden in 1866. He also declared the freedom of women by passing the law of legal majority for unmarried women in 1858 – his sister Princess Eugenie became the first woman who was declared mature.

Though known as King Charles XV (15th) in Sweden (and also on contemporary Norwegian coins), he was actually the ninth Swedish king by that name, as his predecessor Charles IX (reigned 1604–1611) had adopted a numeral according to a fictitious history of Sweden.

Charles, like his father Oscar I, was an advocate of Scandinavianism and the political solidarity of the three northern kingdoms, and his friendship with Frederick VII of Denmark, it is said, led him to give half promises of help to Denmark on the eve of the war of 1864, which, in the circumstances, were perhaps misleading and unjustifiable. In view, however, of the unpreparedness of the Swedish army and the difficulties of the situation, Charles was forced to observe a strict neutrality. On behalf of Charles, Dirk de Graeff van Polsbroek, Dutch diplomat in Japan, concluded a "Vänskaps-, handels- och sjöfartstraktat" ("Friendship, Trade and Maritime Treaty") between Sweden-Norway and Japan on 11 November 1868 (see the Treaty of Yokohama). The treaty opened Hakodate, Yokohama, Nagasaki, Kobe and Osaka to trade for Swedish and Norwegian traders (Article 3). The treaty also gave Sweden-Norway the opportunity to send consuls to the newly opened ports, where they were given the right to exercise jurisdiction over Swedes and Norwegians (consular jurisdiction).

Plagued by ill health for the last years of his life, Charles succumbed to abdominal tuberculosis in Malmö on 18 September 1872.

He was followed on the thrones of both Norway and Sweden by his brother, crowned Oscar II.

=== Personal life ===
Charles XV attained some eminence as a painter and as a poet. In 1872, Charles XV had controversial plans to enter a non-morganatic marriage with the Polish countess Maria Beatrix Krasińska through the assistance of Ohan Demirgian, plans that aroused opposition both in the Royal house and Government and which were interrupted only by his death.

Charles's popularity often had him referred to colloquially as "Kron-Kalle" (Crown-Charlie).

== Issue ==
By his wife, Louise of the Netherlands, Charles had two children, a son who died in infancy and a daughter who married the King of Denmark. The early death of Charles's only legitimate son meant that he was succeeded on the thrones of Sweden and Norway by his younger brother Oscar II.

Name	Birth	Death	Notes
Louise Josephine Eugenie	31 October 1851	21 March 1926	married, 1869, Frederik VIII of Denmark; had issue (including Christian X of Denmark and Haakon VII of Norway).
Carl Oscar Vilhelm Frederik	14 December 1852	13 March 1854	died in infancy of pneumonia.

Charles also sired an illegitimate son, Carl Johan Bolander (4 February 1854 – 28 July 1903), the father of Bishop Nils Bolander, and daughter, Ellen Svensson Hammar (28 October 1865 – 1931), and it has been widely rumored that Charles had many more extramarital children.

A few weeks before Charles's death, his daughter Louise (then Crown Princess of Denmark) gave birth to her second son, Prince Carl of Denmark. In 1905, Prince Carl ascended to the throne of Norway with the regnal name Haakon VII, thus becoming Charles's successor in that country.

No subsequent king of Sweden to this day is Charles's descendant. However, his descendants are on the thrones of Denmark, Luxembourg, Belgium and Norway.

== Honours ==
National decorations

- Knight and Commander of the Seraphim, with Collar, 3 May 1826
- Knight of the Order of Charles XIII, 3 May 1826
- Commander Grand Cross of the Sword, 3 May 1826
- Commander Grand Cross of the Polar Star, 3 May 1826
- Grand Cross of St. Olav, with Collar, 3 May 1826

Foreign decorations

- Denmark:
  - Knight of the Elephant, 16 July 1846
  - Cross of Honour of the Order of the Dannebrog, 22 September 1856
  - Grand Commander of the Dannebrog, 10 June 1860
- Belgium: Grand Cordon of the Order of Leopold (civil), 16 September 1849
- Austrian Empire: Grand Cross of St. Stephen, 1850
- Spain: Knight of the Golden Fleece, 26 June 1855
- Kingdom of Italy: Knight of the Annunciation, 28 July 1861
- Duchy of Anhalt: Grand Cross of Albert the Bear, 5 June 1864
- Kingdom of Bavaria: Knight of St. Hubert, 1846
- (Saxe-Coburg and Gotha) (Duchy of Saxe-Altenburg) (Saxe-Meiningen) Ernestine duchies: Grand Cross of the Saxe-Ernestine House Order, April 1864
- French Empire:
  - Grand Cross of the Legion of Honour
  - Médaille militaire
- Kingdom of Greece: Knight Grand Cross of the Redeemer
- Kingdom of Hanover: Grand Cross of the Royal Guelphic Order, 1849
- Mexican Empire: Grand Cross of the Mexican Eagle, with Collar, 1865
- Nassau: Knight of the Gold Lion of Nassau, July 1858
- Netherlands: Knight Grand Cross of the Netherlands Lion
- Luxembourg: Grand Cross of the Oak Crown
- Kingdom of Portugal: Grand Cross of the Sash of the Three Orders
- Kingdom of Prussia:
  - Knight of the Black Eagle, 1 December 1846
  - Grand Cross of the Red Eagle
- Russian Empire:
  - Knight of St. Andrew
  - Knight of St. Alexander Nevsky
  - Knight of the White Eagle
  - Knight of St. Anna, 1st Class
- Beylik of Tunis: Husainid Family Order

== Arms ==
Prince of Sweden and Norway, Duke of Scania (1826–1844)	Crown Prince of Sweden and Norway, Duke of Scania (1844–1859)	King Charles XV of Sweden and Norway	Monogram of King Charles XV of Sweden

Karl XV/IV House of Bernadotte Born: 3 May 1826 Died: 18 September 1872
Regnal titles
Preceded by Oscar I	King of Sweden and Norway; 1859–1872	Succeeded by Oscar II
Swedish royalty
New creation	Duke of Skåne; 1826–1859	Vacant Title next held by Gustav Adolf
Political offices
Preceded by Severin Løvenskiold	Prime Minister of Norway; 1856	Succeeded by Jørgen Herman Vogt
Preceded by Jørgen Herman Vogt	Prime Minister of Norway; 1857	Succeeded by Jørgen Herman Vogt
