= Edward Aleksander Raczyński =

Polish noble and art collector (1847–1926)

- Count
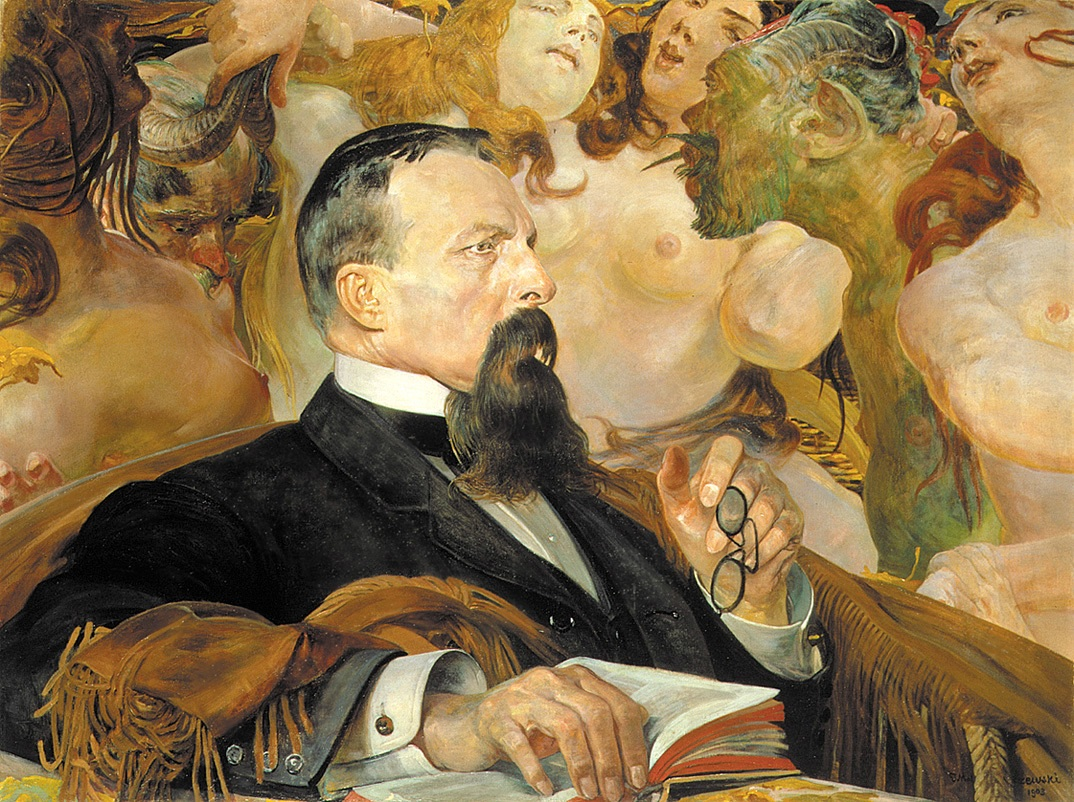
- Painting by Jacek Malczewski, 1903
- Coat of arms: Nałęcz
- Full name: Edward Aleksander Raczyński
- Born: 21 January 1847; Dresden
- Died: 6 May 1926 (aged 79); Kraków
- Family: Raczyński
- Spouses: Maria Beatrix Krasińska; Róża Potocka
- Issue: with Maria Beatrix Krasińska; Karol Roger Raczynski with Róża Potocka; Roger Adam Raczyński; Edward Bernard Raczyński
- Father: Roger Maurycy Raczyński
- Mother: Maria Ernesta Gotschall

Count Edward Aleksander Raczyński (1847–1926) was a Polish nobleman, landowner, patron of the arts, and founder of the Raczyński Art Gallery in Rogalin.

== Biography ==
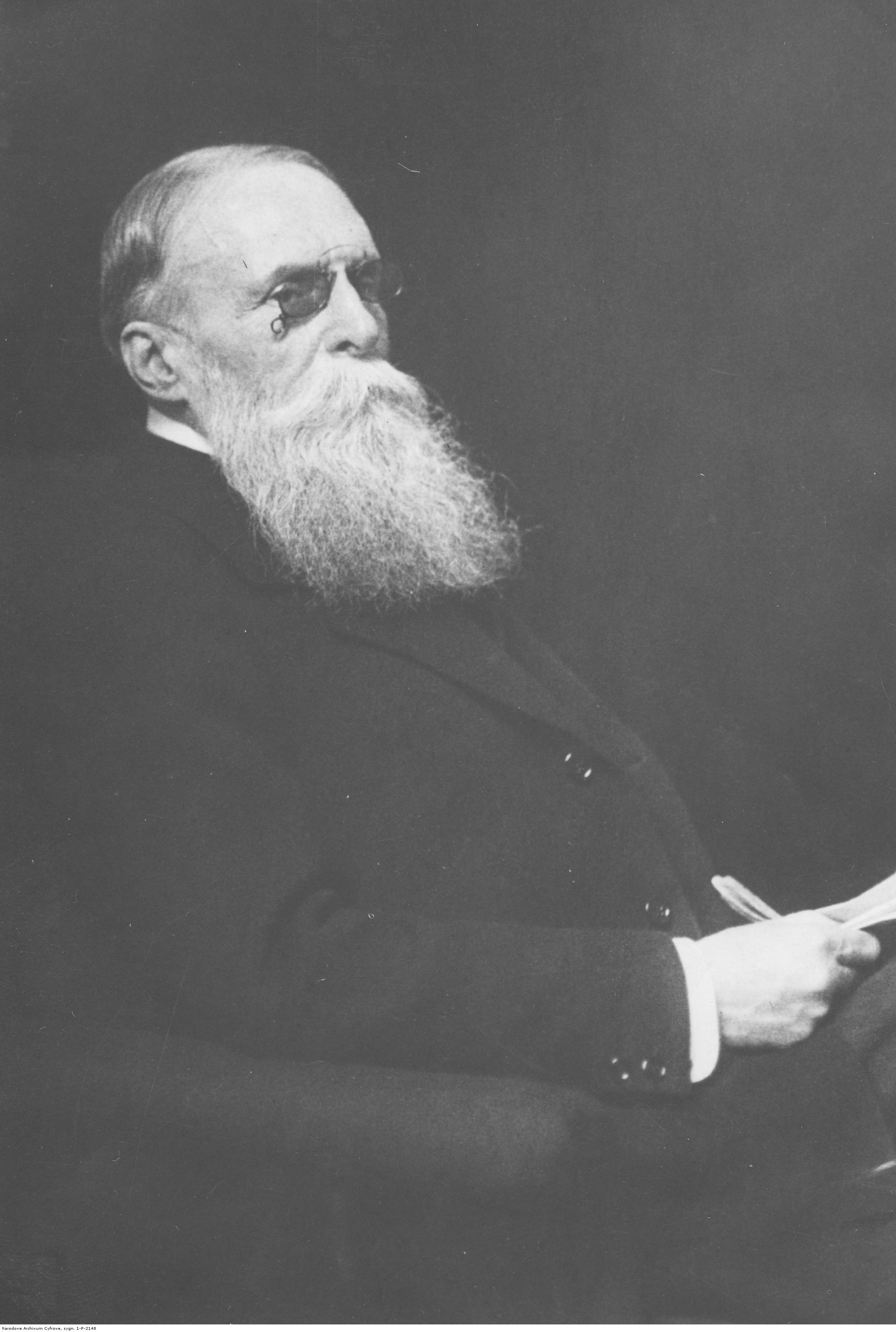
Photograph of Raczyński from the archives of Ilustrowany Kurier Codzienny publishing house, founded in 1910 in Kraków by Marian Dąbrowski

Raczyński was an adventurer and world traveller. After the death of his father in 1864, at the age of 17 he escaped to Turkey for a few months with a friend, Roger Ziolecki, after his guardians attempted to send him to Wroclaw; he was later badly wounded in the 1867 Battle of Mentana, then in 1869 went to Chile, then back to France in 1870 to take part in a war, and in 1874 settled in Kraków at the residence of his aunt countess Katarzyna Potocka.

He became a star of the local society, and was featured in Jan Matejko's Battle of Grunwald (painting) in the lower right-hand section, as the young bearded man with the white bandage on his head wound.
