= Laura Bergnéhr =

Swedish actress

Laura Bergnéhr (died 1852) was a Swedish actress. She is known as the mistress of king Charles XV of Sweden.

Laura Bergnéhr was the daughter of lieutenant Lars August Bergnéhr and the courtesan Lovisa Spångberg (her mother later married the nobleman and court official Axel Fredrik Liljenstolpe), and the cousin of Zelma Hedin and Leocadie Gerlach.

Bergnéhr was an actress and made her debut at the Mindre teatern in 1847. Among her roles there where Cordelia in King Lear. Her stage career, however, seems to have been moderate. She and her three sisters where reportedly well known courtesans in mid 19th-century Stockholm with clientele among the upper classes, "the same and in a similar way famed as the eight Löf sisters", that is to say as the famed courtesan-actress Fredrica Löf and her sisters.

Laura Bergnéhr are most known as the mistress of crown prince Charles: he referred to her as ”Signora Farali” and stated that he would create a new word, "faral", which was "meant to signify and replace the word morality".
