= Prince August, Duke of Dalarna =

Swedish prince (1831–1873)

Prince August
- Duke of Dalarna
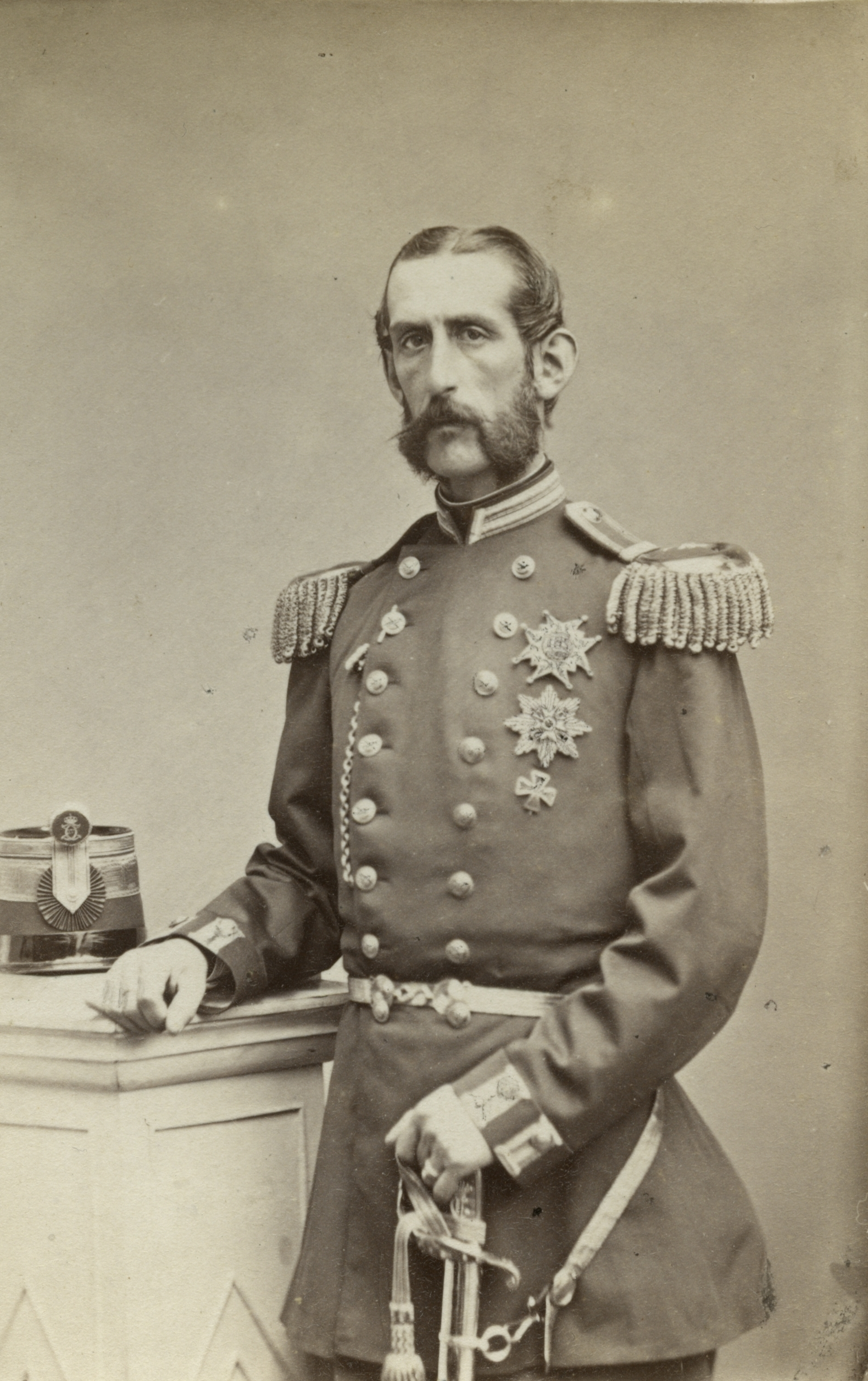
- Photograph of Prince August, c. 1864
- Born: 24 August 1831; Drottningholm Palace, Ekerö, Sweden
- Died: 4 March 1873 (aged 41); Stockholm Palace, Sweden
- Burial: March 13, 1873; Riddarholmen Church, Stockholm
- Spouse: Princess Therese of Saxe-Altenburg (m. 1864)
Names
- Nikolaus August
- House: Bernadotte
- Father: Oscar I of Sweden
- Mother: Josephine of Leuchtenberg
- Occupation: Military

Prince Nikolaus August of Sweden and Norway, Duke of Dalarna (24 August 1831 – 4 March 1873) was the youngest of the five children of King Oscar I of Sweden and Josephine of Leuchtenberg.

== Biography ==
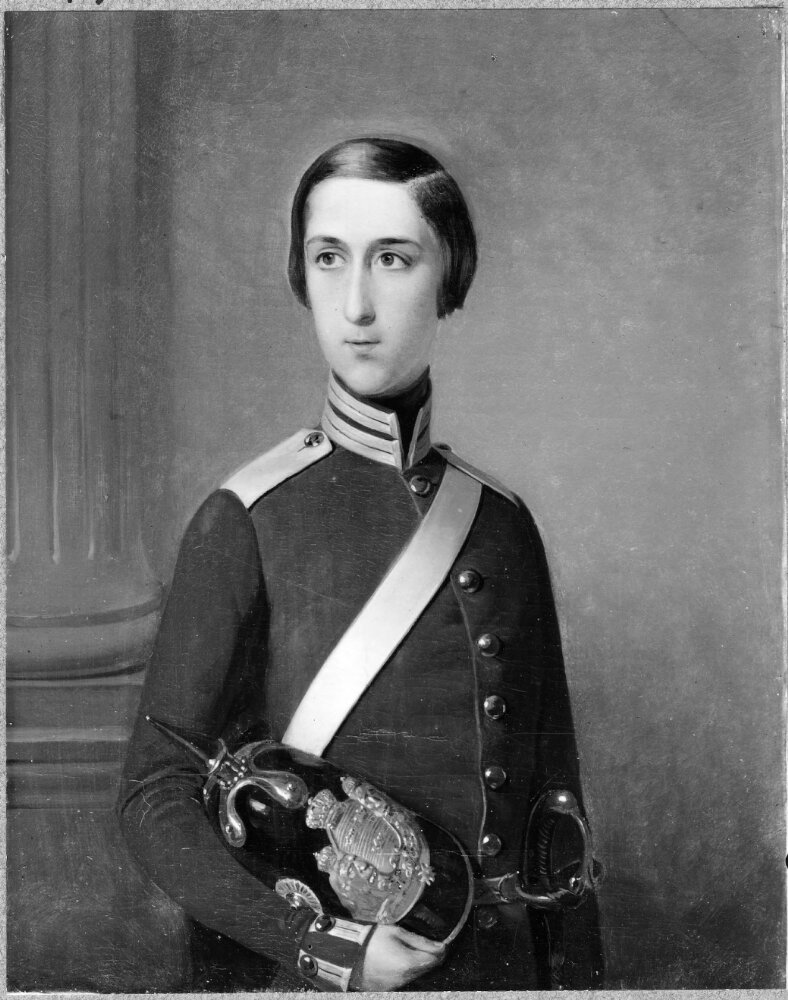
Prince August at age 15 (1846).

=== Early life ===
August was born on 24 August 1831 at Drottningholm Palace in Ekerö, Stockholm County. He was the youngest son of the future King Oscar I and Queen Josephine. Like his siblings, he was raised under the supervision of the governess Christina Ulrika Taube.

During parts of 1849–1853, he was a student at Uppsala University; in 1866, he became drill inspector for the archipelago artillery corps, and in 1872, lieutenant general. On 10 December 1851, he was made an honorary member of the Royal Swedish Academy of Sciences. During his bachelorhood, he lived periodically at Stjernsund Castle in Askersund.

=== Marriage ===
On 16 April 1864 in Altenburg, the Duke married Princess Therese Amalie of Saxe-Altenburg, Duchess of Saxony, eldest daughter of Prince Eduard of Saxe-Altenburg and his first wife Princess Amalie of Hohenzollern-Sigmaringen. The marriage did not produce issue.

The Prince was very interested in trains and locomotives, and the Swedish steam locomotive Prins August was named after him. Since it was commonly thought the Prince was not very bright, this led to the expression "dummare än tåget" (lit. "dumber than the train"), an expression still in use in the Swedish language.According to the Swedish Railway Museum, however, there is no evidence for this, and the expression “dumber than the train” is said to originate from the 1920s. He also had the steamship S/S Prins August named after him.

=== Death ===
Prince August developed pleurisy and died after a few weeks of illness at the Stockholm Palace in Stockholm on March 4, 1873, at 9:30 a.m. The funeral took place nine days later, on March 13, at the Riddarholmen Church.

== Honours and arms ==
=== Honours ===
He received the following orders and decorations:

- [[Order of the Seraphim| (Sweden) Knight and Commander of the Orders of His Majesty the King's Orden]] (Order of the Seraphim), 24 August 1831.
- [[Order of the Seraphim| (Sweden) ]] Knight of the Order of Charles XIII, 24 August 1831.
- [[Order of the Seraphim| (Sweden) ]] Commander Grand Cross of the Sword, 24 August 1831.
- (Sweden) Commander Grand Cross of the Polar Star, 24 August 1831
- (Norway) Grand Cross of St. Olav, with Collar, 21 August 1847
- (Duchy of Anhalt) Grand Cross of Albert the Bear, 21 April 1864
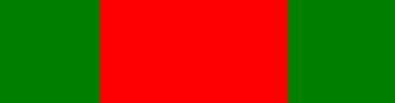
- (Austrian Empire) (Kingdom of Hungary) Austria-Hungary: Grand Cross of the Royal Hungarian Order of St. Stephen, 1870
- Denmark: Knight of the Elephant, 9 June 1852
- (Saxe-Coburg and Gotha) (Duchy of Saxe-Altenburg) (Saxe-Meiningen) Ernestine duchies: Grand Cross of the Saxe-Ernestine House Order, April 1861
- Kingdom of Hanover: Grand Cross of the Royal Guelphic Order, 1852
- Hohenzollern: Cross of Honour of the Princely House Order of Hohenzollern, 1st Class
- Nassau: Knight of the Gold Lion of Nassau, July 1858
- Netherlands: Grand Cross of the Netherlands Lion
- Russian Empire: Knight of St. Andrew, 1863
- Russian Empire: Knight of St. Alexander Nevsky
- Russian Empire: Knight of the White Eagle
- Russian Empire: Knight of St. Anna, 1st Class

=== Arms ===
Arms of Prince August from 1831 to 1844

Arms of Prince August after 1844

== Ancestry ==
Ancestors of Prince August, Duke of Dalarna

8. Jean Henri Bernadotte
4. Charles XIV John of Sweden
9. Jeanne de Saint-Jean
2. Oscar I of Sweden
10. François Clary
5. Désirée Clary
11. Françoise Rose Somis
1. Prince August, Duke of Dalarna
12. Alexandre, vicomte de Beauharnais
6. Eugène de Beauharnais, 1st Duke of Leuchtenberg
13. Joséphine de Tascher de La Pagerie
3. Princess Joséphine of Leuchtenberg
14. Maximilian I Joseph of Bavaria
7. Princess Augusta of Bavaria
15. Princess Augusta Wilhelmine of Hesse-Darmstadt

Prince August, Duke of Dalarna House of Bernadotte Born: 24 August 1831 Died: 4 March 1873
Swedish royalty
Preceded by None	Duke of Dalarna	Succeeded by Carl Johan Bernadotte
