= Princess Eugénie of Sweden =

Swedish princess (1830–1889)

Princess Eugénie
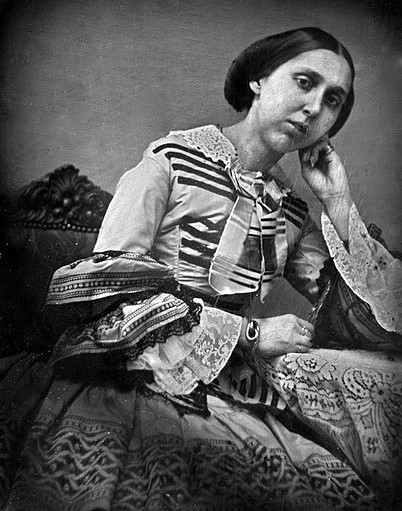
- Daguerreotype photo
- Born: 24 April 1830; Stockholm Palace, Stockholm, Sweden
- Died: 23 April 1889 (aged 58); Stockholm Palace, Stockholm, Sweden
- Burial: Riddarholm Church
Names
- Charlotta Eugénie Augusta Amalia Albertina
- House: Bernadotte
- Father: Oscar I of Sweden
- Mother: Josephine of Leuchtenberg

Princess Eugénie of Sweden and Norway (Charlotta Eugenia Augusta Amalia Albertina; 24 April 1830 – 23 April 1889) was a member of the royal House of Bernadotte and a philanthropist and amateur artist.

== Biography ==
Eugénie was born to King Oscar I of Sweden and Josephine of Leuchtenberg as their fourth child and only daughter. She was named after her maternal grandfather, Eugène de Beauharnais.

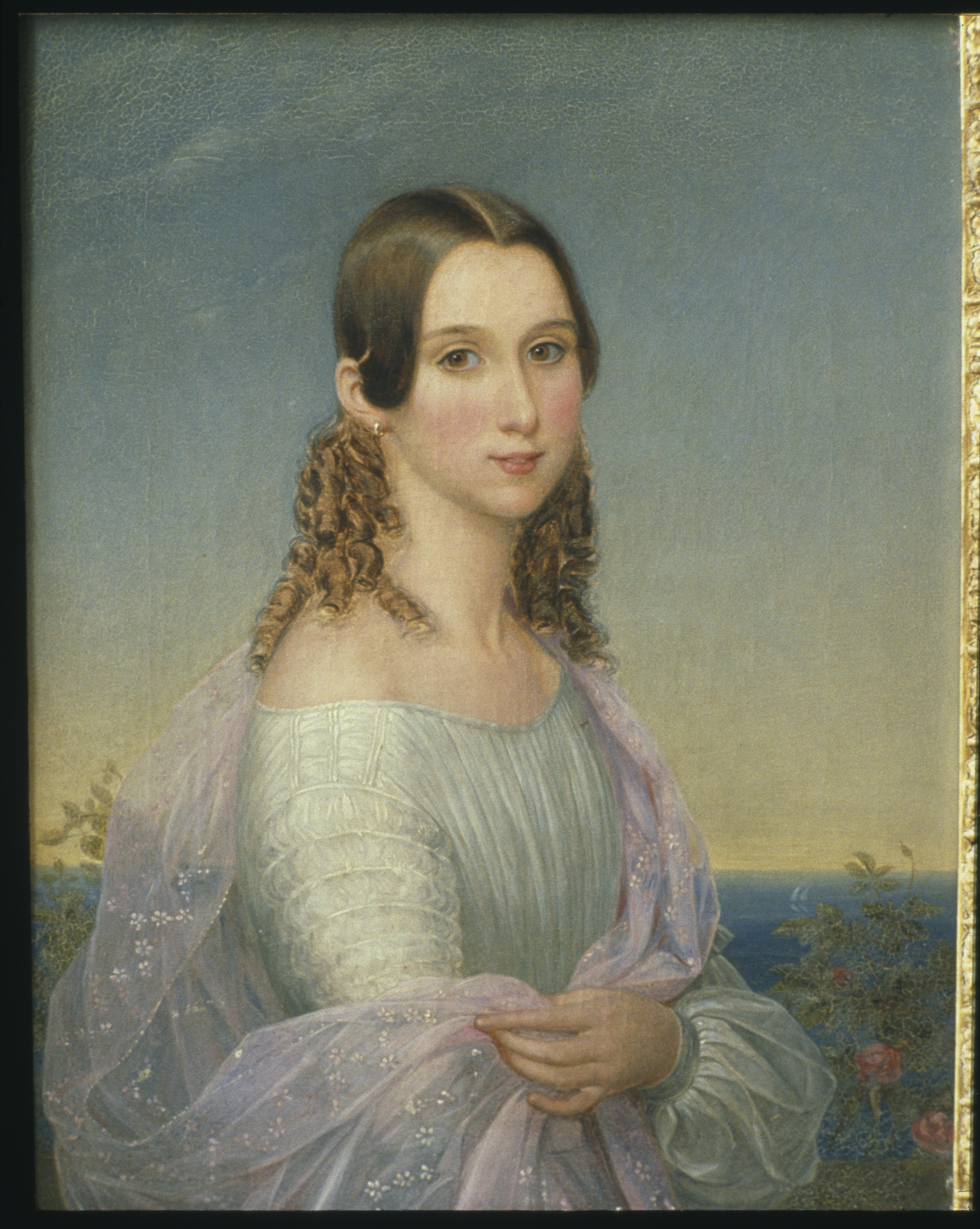
Eugenie of Sweden and Norway

She later wrote of her childhood: "During the years of my childhood I never had a girl of my age for a friend or playmate. Nor did I ever have a doll, but exclusively played boy's games with my brothers." She particularly enjoyed the summers at Tullgarn Palace. Her closest friend was Prince Gustaf, Duke of Uppland, her favorite among her siblings. She was later to say, that during her childhood, she had the wish to be a boy just like her brothers were. Princess Eugénie was placed under the supervision of her senior lady in waiting Karen Anker, and educated with her siblings by the royal court chaplain dr J. G. Lundberg under the supervision of the royal governess countess Christina Ulrika Taube. Anker and Lundberg were both dominant personalities, which is regarded to have formed the consciously submissive character of Eugénie. In 1843, she accompanied her parents on their trip to her maternal grandmother in Bavaria. Eugénie was later to be known for her fragile constitution. This has been attributed to the fact that one of the teachers of the siblings was once ill with tuberculosis, but was allowed to remain in employment, which may have affected the health of some of the children. In 1844, she took ill with a grave cold.

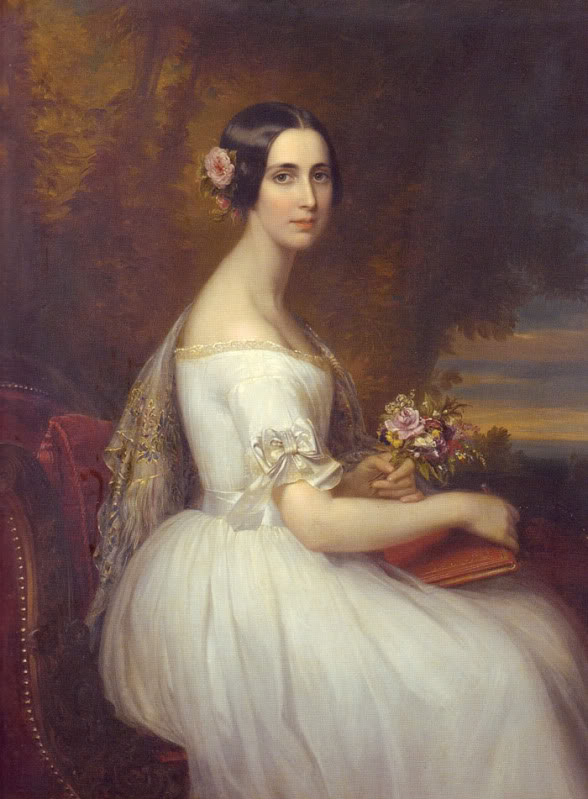
Princess Eugénie of Sweden

Princess Eugénie had her confirmation in the royal chapel in the Stockholm royal palace 25 October 1845, and was thus considered an adult. The following years, she participated in high society and balls, and was regarded as quite pretty. Contemporaries describe her as having regular features, beautiful hands, and big, glowing dark eyes: "her entire being glows of life and goodness", and that she was "much to her advantage in red and gold" in a Spanish costume at a masquerade ball. Eugénie accompanied her brother Charles to Prussia in 1846 with the thought that she might be presented there as a prospective bride, and she was given proposals from Emperor Napoleon III as well as from princes in both Denmark and Germany, but none came to fruition. The reason was likely that she had no wish to marry. She stated herself that she appreciated the "sweet, independent life" her unmarried status gave her: according to the Civil Code of 1734, all unmarried women were under the guardianship of their closest male relative unless she petitioned for legal majority, and when a law reform in 1858 allowed for unmarried women to be automatically declared of legal majority by a simple application to the closest court, Eugénie belonged to the first women to use this right. Early on, she had a great interest in the arts, and was active as a composer, painter, sculptor and writer.

The year of 1852 signified a great crisis in her life. This year, the royal family fell ill during a visit to Oslo. Her favorite brother and closest friend, Prince Gustaf, Duke of Uppland, died, which had a great effect on her emotional life. She herself had pneumonia, and her health never truly recovered from this. For the rest of her life, she suffered from chest problems and had some trouble walking, and in 1861, she is described as prematurely aged by suffering. In 1871, Fritz von Dardel commented that she was yellow and thin, though somewhat less grave like than before. In 1860, her doctor Magnus Huss recommended that she would benefit from the climate of Gotland. She visited the island the summer of that year, and from 1861 onward, she spent every summer at her own villa Fridhem outside Visby, where she did feel somewhat better. The winters, she still resided in her apartments at the royal palace in Stockholm, but was forced to confine herself to the smaller rooms of the palace, which could be entirely heated, during the cold season: she referred to the winter season as her "winter imprisonment".

The crisis of her destroyed health and the death of her brother gave Eugénie a great interest in religion. As the daughter of a Protestant and a Catholic, she was tolerant and predominately an ecumenical Christian, who focused on Christianity as a whole and did not wish commit herself to a particular branch of Christianity and disliked division and discord between the different Christian branches. She was inspired by the teachings of Thomas a Kempis, and supported the revival movement of Carl Olof Rosenius, which had been recommended by her lady in waiting Josephine Hamilton. During the winter of 1878–79, the preacher Granville Waldegrave, 3rd Baron Radstock was invited to preach for her.

In parallel, Princess Eugénie developed an increasing interest in charity after her crisis, a philanthropy that grew by the years as her health forced her to give up her interests in the arts. She inherited a fortune upon the death of her mother in 1876. However, she spent little money on herself: Count Lewenhaupt noted, for example, that during her stay overnight at his estate, she had eaten nothing but cooked carrots and some boiled water. She freely gave away her money, to such an extent that her brother the king gave instructions to the governors in the cities his sister visited to "protect" his sister from "insolent beggars". Most of her money was spent on her charity projects, so much so that her brother Oscar II asked her to save the family something of the inheritance after their mother. She respected his wish in her will of 1885, where she left two thirds of her fortune to her nephews, and the rest to be divided upon her charities. Princess Eugénie died after a long period of illness on 23 April 1889, just before her 59th birthday.

== Artist ==
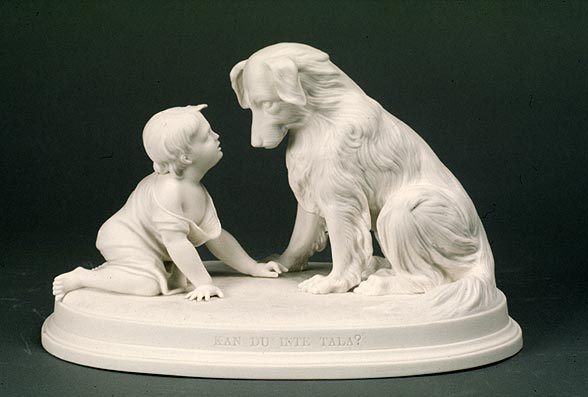
Kan-du-inte-tala

Princess Eugénie was active in many forms of art. Early on, she composed music with her brother Prince Gustaf, Duke of Uppland. She composed several songs and piano compositions. As a musician, she often hosted concerts. She was a good friend of the composer Lotten Edholm. Her hymn O, at jeg kunde min Jesus prise is set to a Norwegian folk tune and was translated as My heart is longing.

She studied painting and drawing. As a painter, she is known for her watercolor paintings of life at the royal court. The images illustrate both everyday court life as well as outings, travelling and balls, display a humorous tone and has a similar style as those of Fritz von Dardel. She is regarded to have had true talent as a painter, but her social position and gender created some difficulty in her attempts to develop her talent, as it was not considered suitable for her to study human male adult anatomy: her mother refused to allow her to study nude models. Later in life, she supported the efforts of her nephew Prince Eugen, who also became a painter.

She was also active as a sculptor, and a student of J. P. Molin. Some of her designs were made into porcelain ornaments in Rörstrand and Gustavsberg. Her mother's refusal to allow her to study human anatomy created difficulties to develop this talent as well. This was partially solved after an incident described by Fritz von Dardel. Upon a visit to the princess, he discovered that she was sculpturing a small statue of soldier in clay. She used the uniform of a soldier as a model, but this was not sufficient, as the legs of the soldiers did not look realistic. To assist her, Fritz von Dardel modeled his legs for her. They were interrupted by the queen dowager, who did not approve of a male model. The statue, however, which depicted a Norwegian pipe blower, turned out well after Dardel had modeled for it, and was made into a porcelain statue at Rörstrand. The incident of Dardel's modeling for Eugenie also proved benefiting for her development as an artist: after this, her mother allowed her to study the human anatomy of children, who were allowed to model for her. The perhaps most known piece of art attributed to her is a porcelain figurine of a dog and a child sitting opposite each other, entitled Kan du inte tala? ("Can't You Speak?"), which was manufactured at Gustavsberg and became a popular ornament. She also designed an allegory of faith and the apostles of Peter and Paul for her mother's chapel. Her work was represented at the Stockholm Art Exhibition of 1866. In November 1873, she was inducted as an honorary member of the Royal Swedish Academy of Arts.

As a writer, Eugenie published the conventional Svenska prinsessor ("Swedish Princesses") in 1864. She also translated Korsets Skola (The School of the Cross) by M. F. Roos from German. One of her friends was the writer Lina Sandell.

Eugenie used the income from her art to finance her charity. She eventually stopped her art production for health reasons and turned entirely to charity.

== Philanthropic work ==
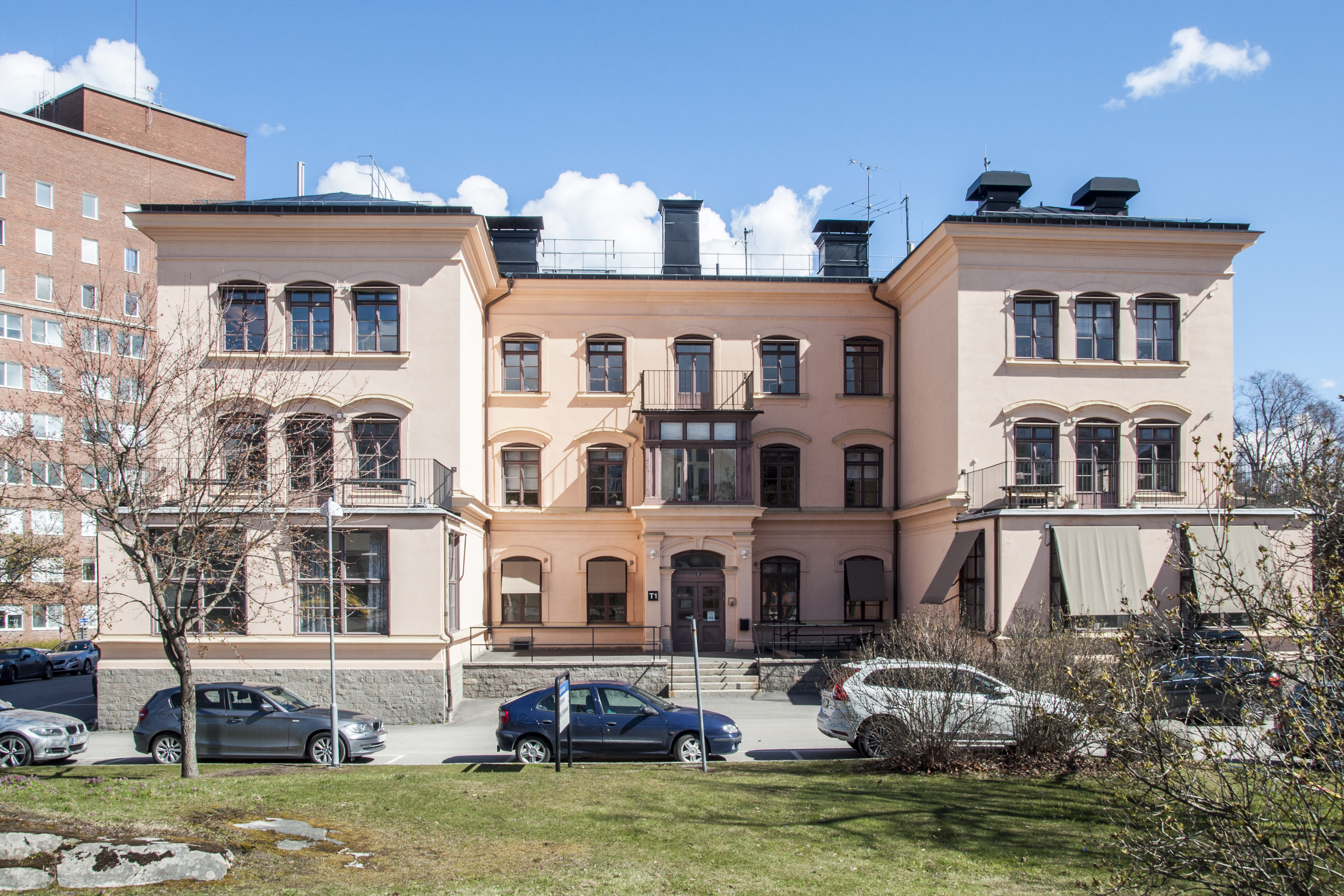
Main building (2017) of the Eugeniahemmet institution which opened in 1886 with the princess as chairman

Princess Eugénie was honored as a philanthropist by C. D. af Wirsén in his poem »De lidandes furstinna» ("The Princess of the tormented") from 1890.

Her philanthropic work was focused on Gotland and her summer villa Fridhem. In 1866, she founded an orphanage for boys, and three years later, an orphanage for girls, both attached to her villa and under her personal supervision. To its benefit, she founded Protection Societies in Visby.

In 1869, she founded a Gotlands sjukhem (Gotland Hospital) for the terminally ill, financed by the jewels from her grandmother Désirée Clary. In 1875, she created an association to support the fishermen of the west coast of Gotland. In 1879, she became the chairperson of a relief society for poor, terminally ill, invalids and handicapped children: through this society, she opened a home in Sundbyberg in 1882, completed in the Eugeniahemmet in Solna, named after her (1886).

In 1881, she and bishop L. A. Anjou co-founded Visby stadsmission (Visby City Mission). In 1885, she and her friend Adéle Rudenschöld co-founded an association to the protection of animals, from 1888 renamed Gotlands djurskyddsförening (The Gotland Animal's Protection Society).

She also supported the blind and poor students. She contributed to the Fjellstedt School in Uppsala, as well as the Lapplandsmissionen (Lappland Mission).

== Sample of compositions ==
Piano compositions

- Drottning Josephinas polonaise, (Queen Josephines polonaise) (1854)
- Louisa vals (The waltz of Louisa) (1858?)
- La priere (1844)
- Sorgmarsch, (Marsch of mourning), to the memory of Queen Louise (1871)
- Tullgarns-galopp (The Tullgarn gallop) (1853)

Songs

- Novemberkvällen (November evening)
- Fiskaren (The fisherman) (1850)
- Romans vid piano (Romance at the piano) (1859)
- Sång Orden af Tibell (The Song order of Tibell) (1863)
- Augusta-dagen (The day of Augusta) (1865)

== Arms and monogram ==
| Coat of Arms of Princess Eugenie | Royal Monogram of Princess Eugenie |

== Ancestry ==
Ancestors of Princess Eugénie of Sweden

8. Jean Henri Bernadotte
4. Charles XIV John of Sweden
9. Jeanne de Saint-Jean
2. Oscar I of Sweden
10. François Clary
5. Désirée Clary
11. Françoise Rose Somis
1. Princess Eugénie of Sweden
12. Alexandre, vicomte de Beauharnais
6. Eugène de Beauharnais, 1st Duke of Leuchtenberg
13. Joséphine de Tascher de La Pagerie
3. Princess Joséphine of Leuchtenberg
14. Maximilian I Joseph of Bavaria
7. Princess Augusta of Bavaria
15. Princess Augusta Wilhelmine of Hesse-Darmstadt
