= Fredric Westin =

Swedish painter (1782–1862)

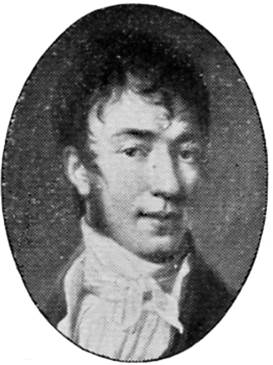
- Fredric Westin, from the Svenskt Porträttgalleri XX (1901); artist not credited. (Self-portrait?)
- Born: May 13, 1782; Stockholm, Sweden
- Died: May 13, 1862 (aged 79); Stockholm, Sweden

Fredric Westin (22 September 1782 – 13 May 1862) was a Swedish history and portrait painter.

== Biography ==
He studied with Lorens Pasch the Younger and Louis Masreliez at the Royal Swedish Academy of Arts. In 1808, he became an "Agré" (a type of junior associate) at the Academy. Four years later, he was appointed a Director at the Nationalmuseum and joined the board of directors at the Academy. In 1815, he became a Vice-Professor and, the following year, a full Professor. He served as Director there from 1828 to 1840 and, in 1843, was appointed a "Hovintendent" (a largely honorary position) at the Royal Court.

After 1812, many of his works were done for the Royal Families, including door panels for the bedchamber of Crown Prince (later King) Charles at Rosersberg Palace, a mural of the Four Seasons at Sävstaholm Castle, and Hebe with her father Zeus in the form of an eagle at Rosendal Palace.

He was very popular as a portrait painter during the reign of Charles XIV, but was not universally appreciated. The well known author and art critic Lorenzo Hammarsköld felt that he had no talent. Many years later, Fredrik Wilhelm Scholander said that his portraits looked like wax figures.

Despite the criticism, he was commissioned to do many portraits of the Bernadottes. In 1824, he created a popular allegorical painting of Crown Princess Josephine returning to Sweden, borne in the clouds by cupids. His 1838 equestrian painting of the King is also very well known.

In 1828, after Johan Gustaf Sandberg failed to produce an altarpiece commissioned for Saint James's Church, the project was given to Westin, who completed it with a transfiguration of Christ. Over the next decade, he produced several other altarpieces on themes from the Gospels at Kungsholms Church, Turku Cathedral, Uddevalla Church and Carl Gustafs Church.

== Selected portraits ==
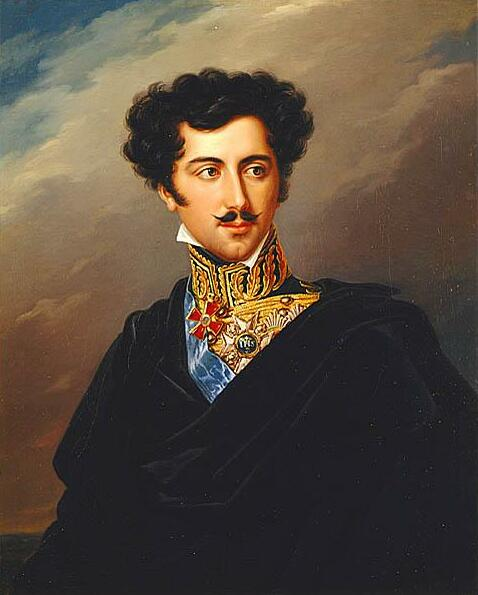
Crown Prince Oscar (1825)

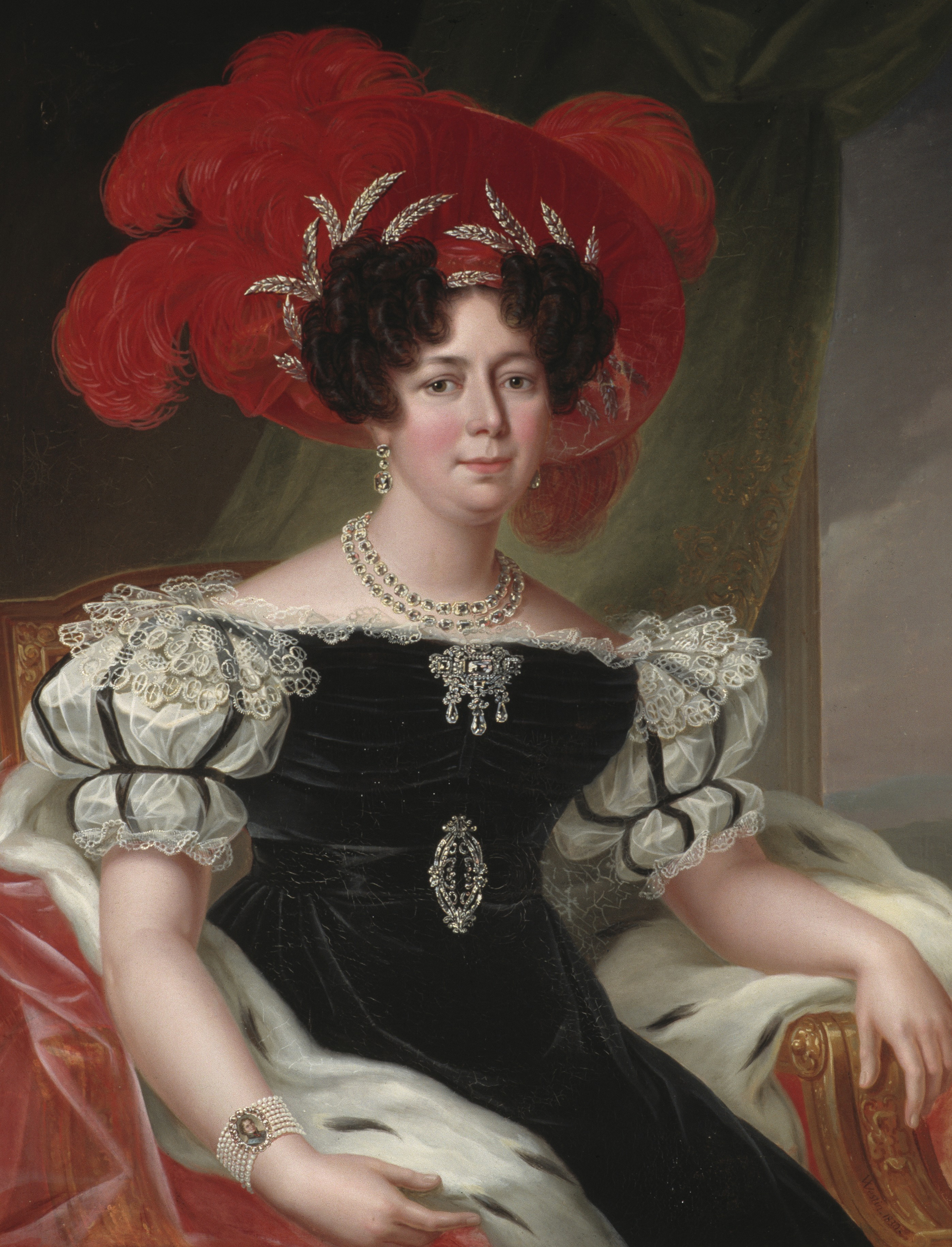
Queen Consort Desideria

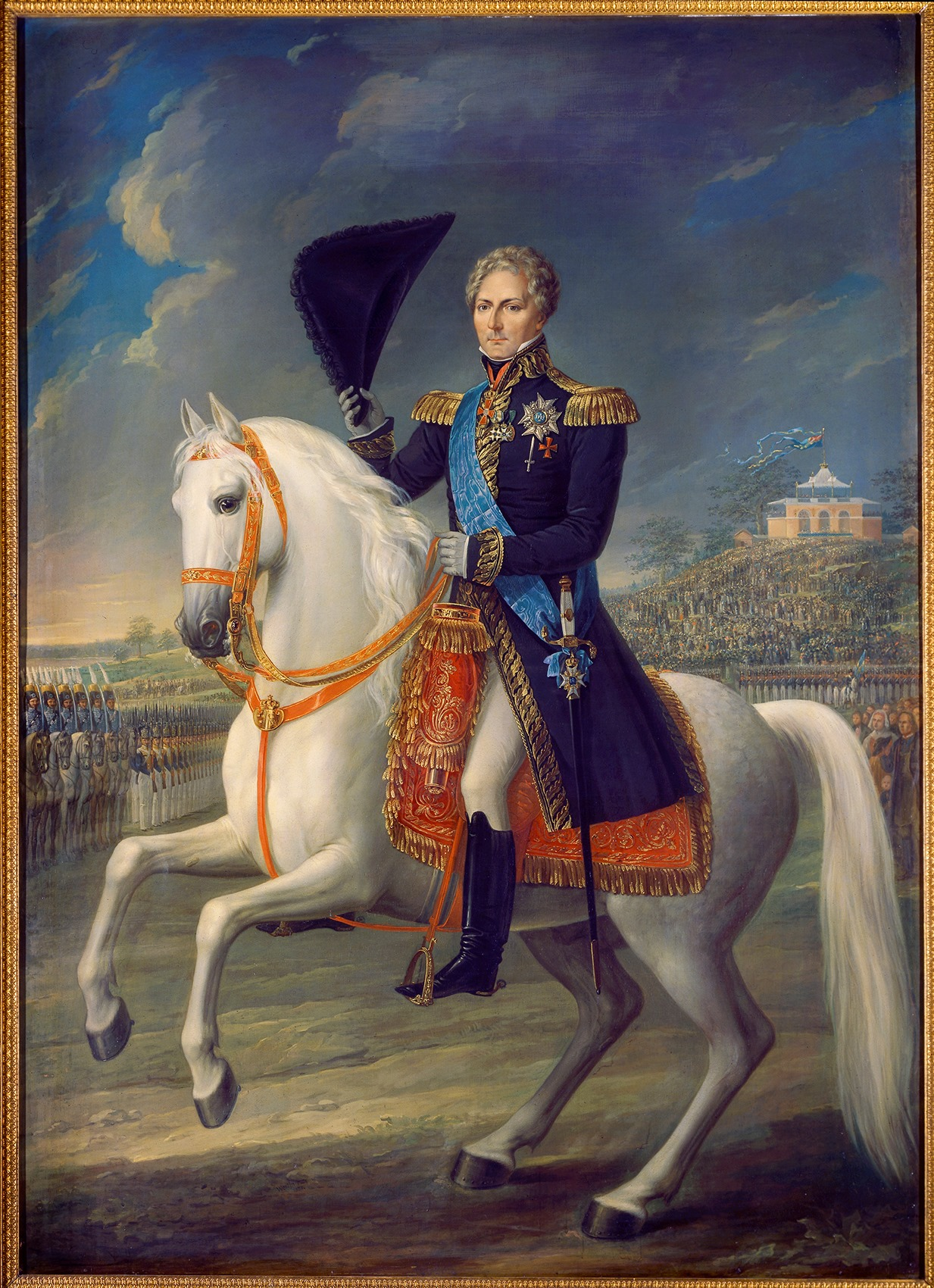
King Charles XIV (1838)

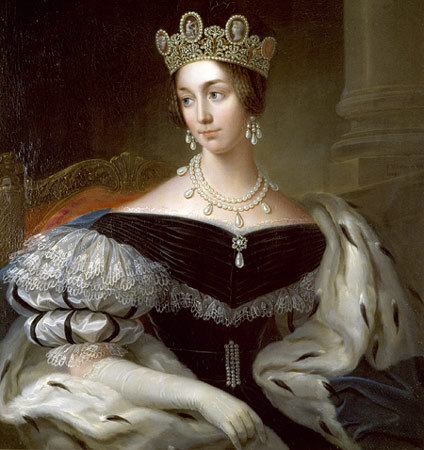
Crown Princess Josephine
