= Prince Gustaf of Sweden =

Several Swedish Princes have been named Gustaf. This list does not include those who eventually became Kings of Sweden.

- Gustaf Gustafsson of Vasa, later known as Gustaf Gustafsson of Vasa (1799-1877)
- Prince Gustaf, Duke of Uppland (1827-1852) (The Singer Prince)
