= Sällskapet för uppmuntran av öm och sedlig modersvård =

Sällskapet för uppmuntran av öm och sedlig modersvård ("Society for the encouragement of tender and virtuous motherly care") was a royal Swedish charity organisation, founded in Stockholm 3 May 1827 and ended in 1944.

== Foundation and organisation ==
It was one of the major charity foundations founded by Crown Princess Josephine, who served as its first honorary chairperson and protector. The organisation was a Swedish example of the private charity organisations which did not believe in unconditional help to the needing, and who became common in the Western world during the 19th-century.

It was one of the first private charity organisations in Sweden to be founded and managed by women. The members consisted of women from the upper classes: six married women appointed by the chairperson managed its affairs. Only married women could be full members, but unmarried women could assist, and men were donors and financiers. The organisation was popular among the aristocracy.

== Activity ==
The purpose of the organisation was to provide financial help to poor married or widowed mothers with three or more children below the age of fifteen. The women selected to benefit from the charity of the organization were to be poor mothers, who were estimated by the charity organisation to have good morale, not to blame for having caused their own poverty, and for being good mothers to their children. The help was given to the mothers partially by providing them with work assignments which they could perform at home, mainly sewing, and sell their works. The organisation was financed by selling these works as well as by donations. The women receiving the charity were regularly controlled by the charity women through the parish priests, and the help stopped if the women were seen as not fulfilling the terms of being virtuous and pious ladies giving their children a virtuous and pious upbringing.

== Dissolution and legacy ==
It played a significant part within private charity in 19th-century Sweden. It became an inspirational role model for other charity organizations, notably its equivalent in Gothenburg, which was founded twenty years later and was basically a copy of it. The charity became less needed when the Social Democratic welfare system was introduced and expanded from the 1930s onward. The organisation had its last meeting in 1942 and closed in 1944.
