= Lotten Edholm =

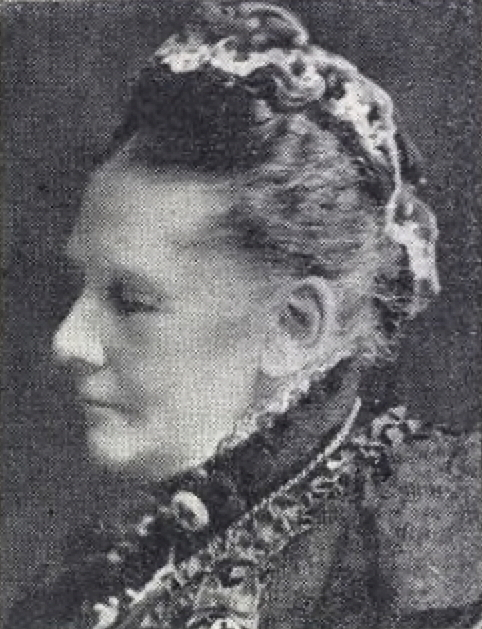
- Born: 18 March 1839
- Died: 12 July 1930 (aged 91)
- Spouse: Edvard Edholm

Lovisa Christina Charlotta "Lotten" Edholm or af Edholm, née von Heijne (18 April 1839 - 12 July 1930) was a Swedish composer and a pioneer within the Swedish Red Cross.

She was born to the nobleman Georg Fredrik von Heijne-Lillienberg and Juliana Charlotta Silfverstolpe, and married Edvard Edholm (1831-1913), physician to the king, in 1867. She served as hovfröken (maid of honour) to the queen dowager Josephine in 1865–67.

Lotten Edholm initiated the participation of women in Sweden in the Swedish Red Cross and served as chair of the women's section of the Swedish Red Cross in 1865–1906. She also started a cooking school in Stockholm. Lotten Edholm was also active as a composer and composed piano music for private use in high society life.

In 1919, she published her memoirs, Från barndom till ålderdom (From Childhood to Old Age).
