= Oscar I of Sweden =

King of Sweden and Norway from 1844 to 1859

Oscar I
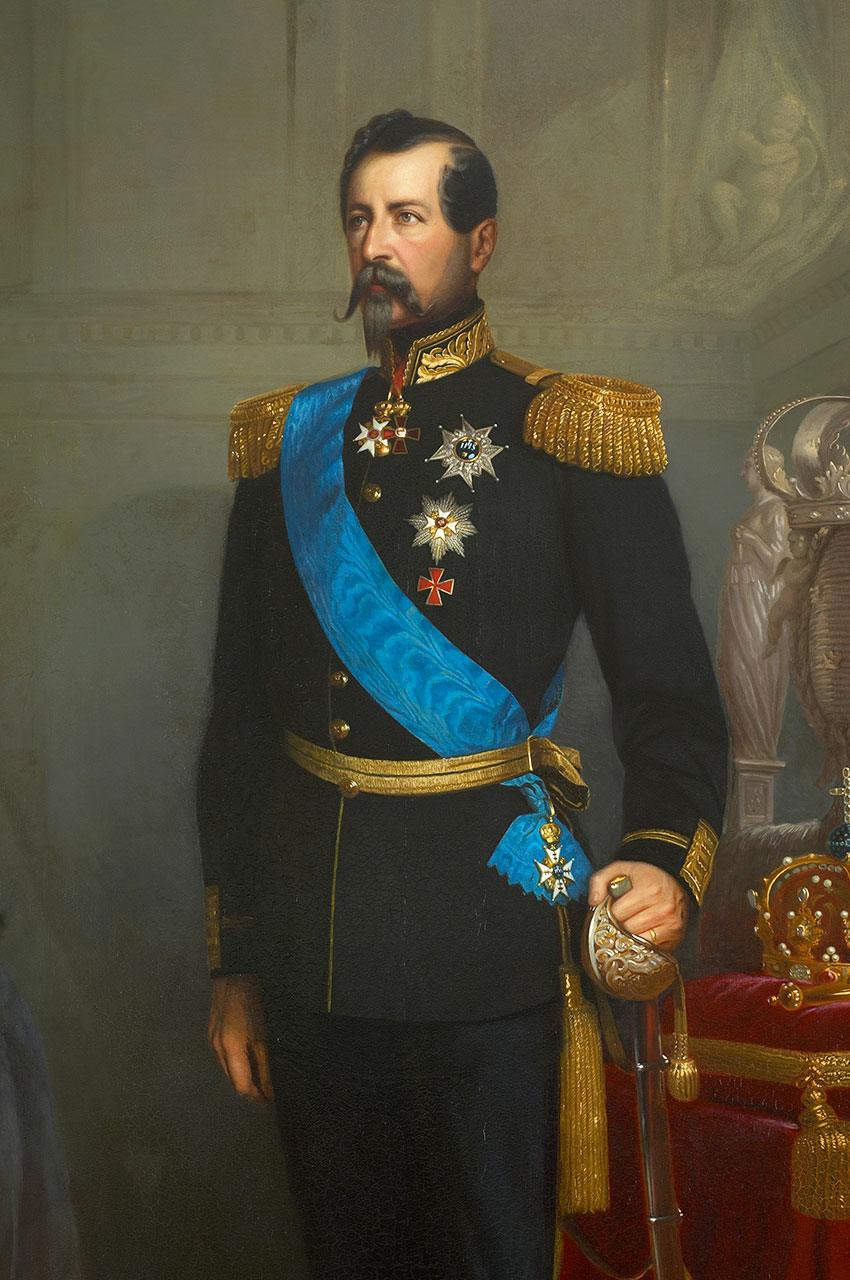
- Portrait, 1856

King of Sweden and Norway
- Reign: 8 March 1844 – 8 July 1859
- Coronation: 28 September 1844
- Predecessor: Charles XIV & III John
- Successor: Charles XV & IV
- Born: Joseph François Oscar Bernadotte; 4 July 1799; Paris, France
- Died: 8 July 1859 (aged 60); Stockholm, Sweden
- Burial: 8 August 1859; Riddarholm Church
- Spouse: Josephine of Leuchtenberg (m. 1823)
- Issue: Charles XV; Prince Gustaf, Duke of Uppland; Oscar II; Princess Eugenie; Prince August, Duke of Dalarna
- House: Bernadotte
- Father: Charles XIV John
- Mother: Désirée Clary

Oscar I (Note: The king himself and many modern writers have spelled the royal name Oscar, while the Swedish royal family uses the spelling Oskar.) (born Joseph François Oscar Bernadotte; 4 July 1799 – 8 July 1859) was King of Sweden and Norway from 8 March 1844 until his death in 1859. He was the second monarch of the House of Bernadotte.

The only child of King Charles XIV John, Oscar inherited the thrones upon the death of his father. Throughout his reign he would pursue a liberal course in politics in contrast to Charles XIV John, instituting reforms and improving ties between Sweden and Norway. In an address to him in 1857, the Riksdag declared that he had promoted the material prosperity of the kingdom more than any of his predecessors.

== Early life and family ==
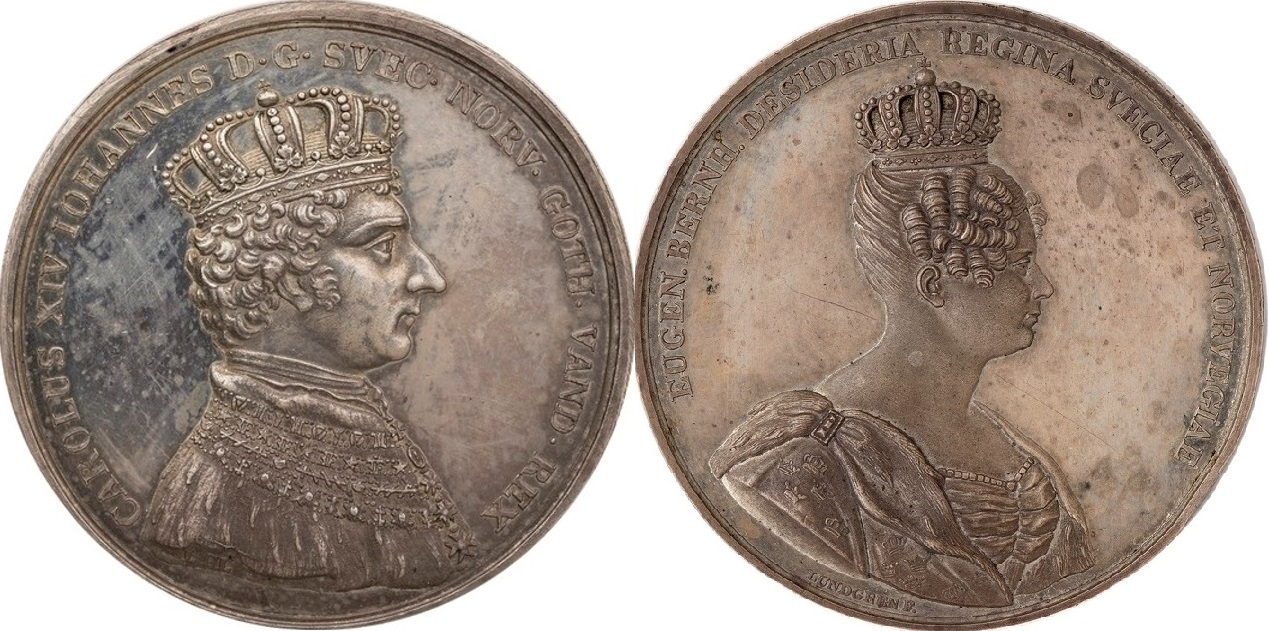
Oscar's parents, King Carl John and Queen Desideria

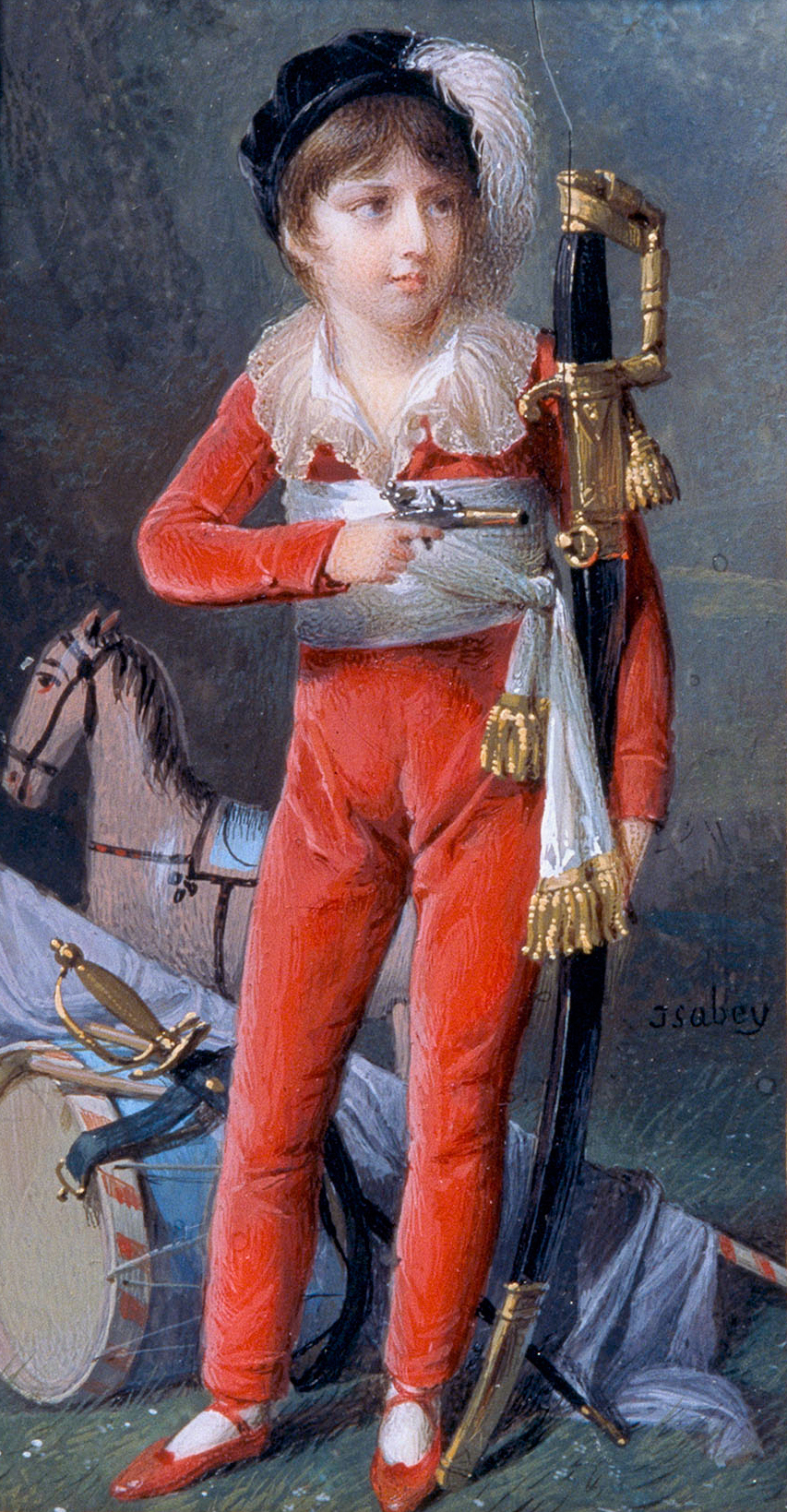
Oscar Bernadotte a few years before being chosen with his father to be Swedish royalty.

Oscar was born at 291 Rue Cisalpine in Paris (today: 32 Rue Monceau) (Note: On 4 July 1911, a memorial plaque was placed on the building by the Société archéologique.) to Jean-Baptiste Jules Bernadotte, then-French Minister of War and later Marshal of the Empire and Sovereign Prince of Pontecorvo, and Désirée Clary, Napoleon Bonaparte's former fiancée. He was named Joseph after his godfather Joseph Bonaparte, who was married to his mother's elder sister Julie, but was also given the names François Oscar. The latter name was chosen by Napoleon after one of the heroes in the Ossian cycle of poems, and was the name that came to be used in the family, mainly by the mother and the aunt. Désirée is said to have chosen Napoleon to be Oscar's godfather. He spent his first years in France, living with his mother and aunt, partly in Paris, partly at Joseph Bonaparte's country residence, the Château de Mortefontaine north of Paris. In 1807, he received his first tutor, Le Moine.

== Prince of Sweden ==
As the Swedish king Charles XIII was without legitimate heirs, and Sweden therefore was without an heir to the throne, Oscar's father was proposed as a possible candidate to the Swedish throne in 1810. As one of the arguments for his election, it was argued that he already had a son and the future succession to the throne was secured. A portrait of the young Oscar was handed out at the Diet of the Four Estates assembled in Örebro to elect an heir to the throne, serving as a lever for the election of Bernadotte. On 21 August 1810, the Riksdag elected Oscar's father as heir-presumptive to the Swedish throne. Two months later, on 5 November, he was formally adopted by the king under the name of "Charles John"; Oscar was then created a Prince of Sweden with the style of Royal Highness, and further accorded the title of Duke of Södermanland. Oscar and his mother moved from Paris to Stockholm in June 1811; while Oscar soon acclimated to life at the royal court, quickly acquiring the Swedish language, Désirée had difficulty adjusting and despised the cold weather. Consequently, she left Sweden in the summer of 1811, and would not return until 1823.

Oscar, who was accompanied to Sweden by Le Moine, immediately got a teacher of Swedish and was soon able to serve as his father's interpreter. On 17 January 1816, Oscar was elected an honorary member of the Royal Swedish Academy of Sciences, and in 1818 was appointed chancellor of Uppsala University, where he spent one semester.

Oscar became Crown Prince in 1818 upon the death of his adoptive grandfather, and the accession of Charles John to the Swedish and Norwegian thrones.

== Crown Prince ==
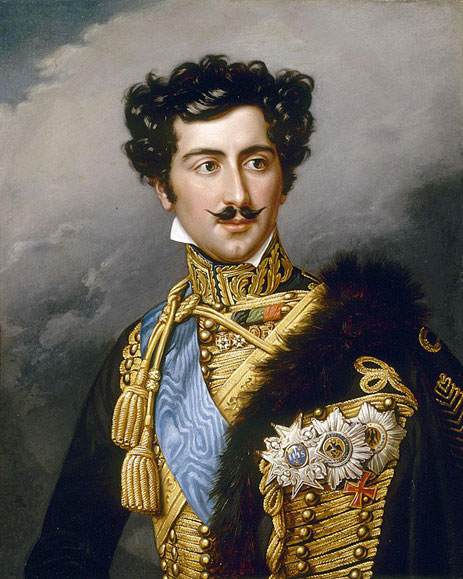
Portrait of Oscar as Crown Prince by Joseph Karl Stieler, 1823

In 1824 and 1833, Oscar briefly served as Viceroy of Norway.

In 1832–1834 he completed the romantic opera Ryno, the errant knight, which had been left unfinished on the death of the young composer Eduard Brendler. In 1839 he wrote a series of articles on popular education, and in 1841 anonymously published Om Straff och straffanstalter, a work advocating prison reforms.

== Reign ==
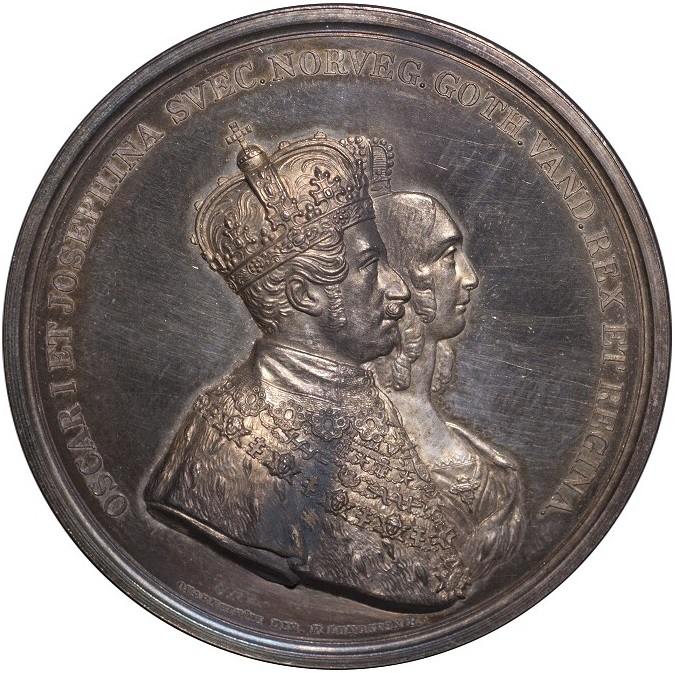
Coronation medal 1844

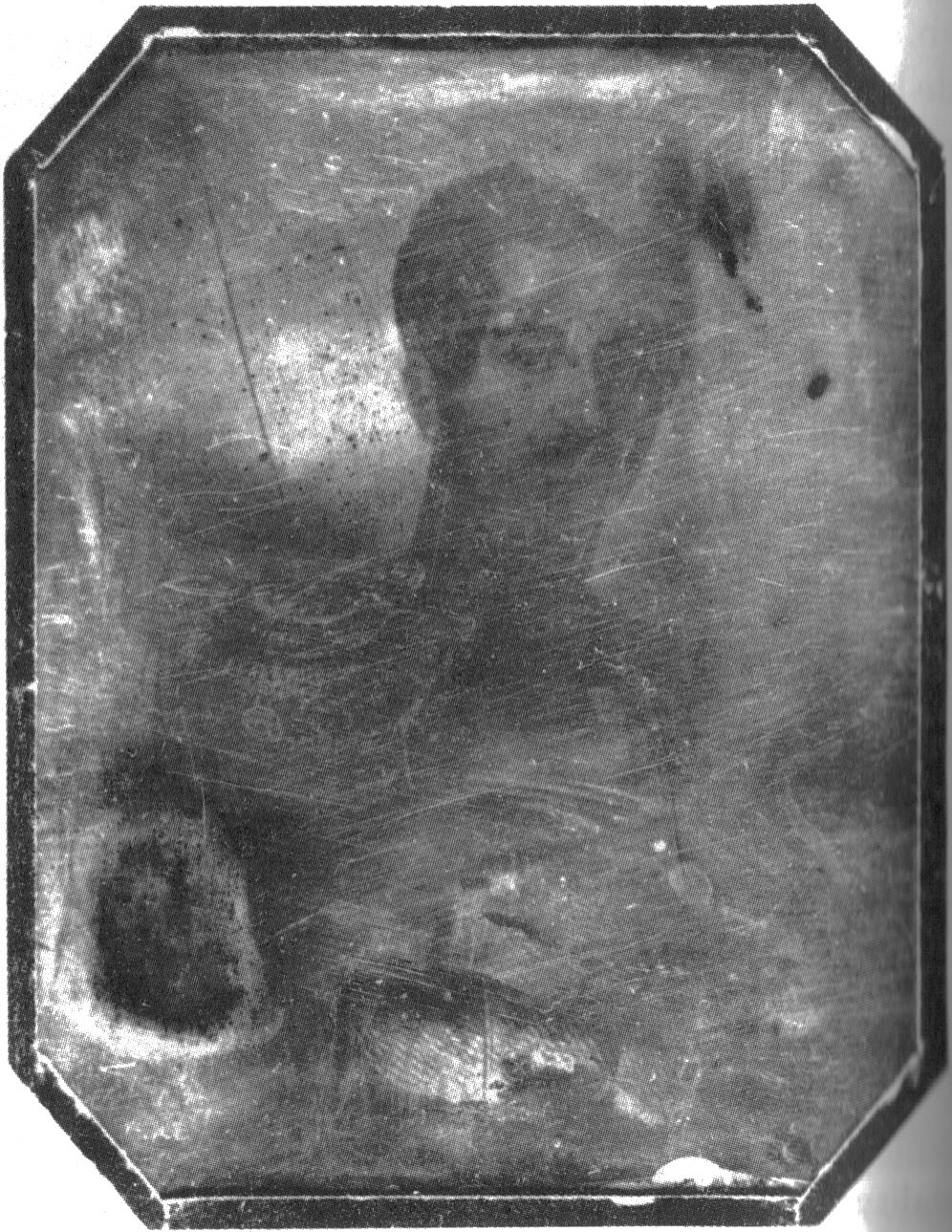
Daguerreotype of Oscar I in 1844; this is the first known photograph of a Swedish monarch.

In 1838 Charles XIV John began to suspect that his son was plotting with the Liberal politicians to bring about a change of ministry, or even his own abdication. If Oscar did not actively assist the opposition on this occasion, his disapprobation of his father's despotic behaviour was notorious, though he avoided an actual rupture. Yet his liberalism was of the most cautious and moderate character, as the opposition—shortly after his accession to the thrones in 1844—discovered to their great chagrin. The new king would not hear of any radical reform of the cumbersome and obsolete 1809 Instrument of Government, which made the king a near-autocrat. However, one of his earliest measures was to establish freedom of the press. He also passed the first law supporting gender equality in Sweden when he in 1845 declared that in the absence of a will specifying otherwise, brothers and sisters should have equal inheritance. Oscar I also formally established equality between his two kingdoms by introducing new flags with the common Union badge of Sweden and Norway, as well as a new coat of arms for the union.

In foreign affairs, Oscar I was a friend of the principle of nationality; in 1848 he supported Denmark against the Kingdom of Prussia in the First War of Schleswig by placing Swedish and Norwegian troops in cantonments in Funen and North Schleswig (1849–1850), and was the mediator of the Truce of Malmö (26 August 1848). He was also one of the guarantors of the integrity of Denmark (the London Protocol, 8 May 1852).

As early as 1850, Oscar I had conceived the plan of a dynastic union of the three Scandinavian kingdoms, but such difficulties presented themselves that the scheme had to be abandoned. He succeeded, however, in reversing his father's favored-nation policy towards Imperial Russia. His fear lest Russia should demand a stretch of coast along the Varanger Fjord induced him to remain neutral during the Crimean War, and, subsequently, to conclude an alliance with the United Kingdom and the Second French Empire (25 November 1855) for preserving the territorial integrity of Sweden-Norway.

== Death ==
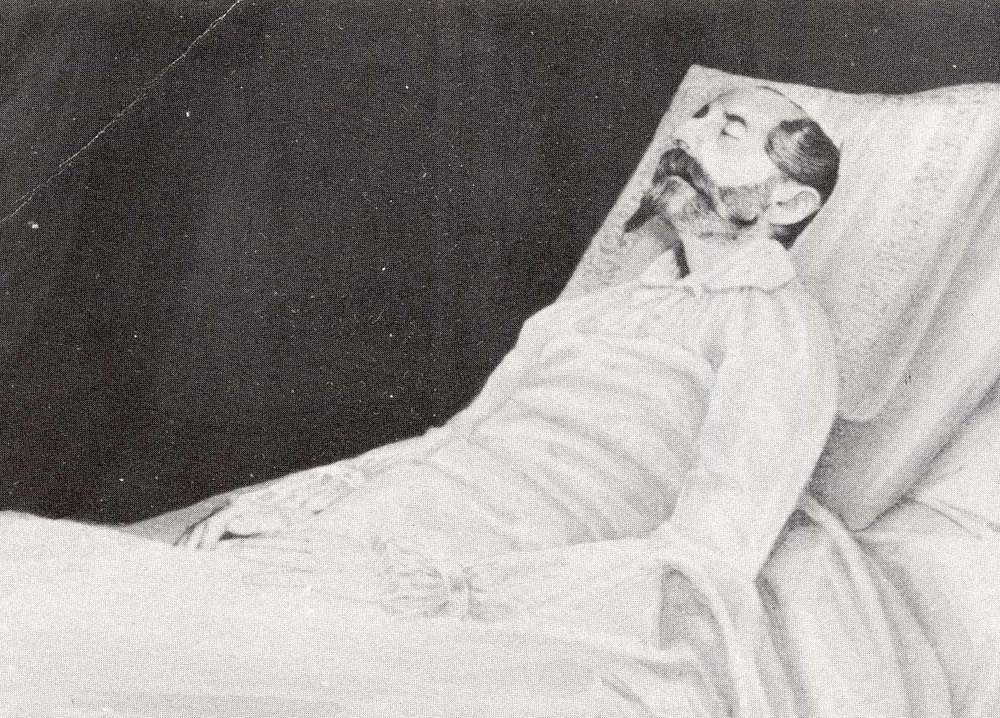
Oscar on his deathbed in 1859

In the 1850s, Oscar's health began to rapidly deteriorate; he became paralyzed in 1857 and died two years later at the Royal Palace in Stockholm on 8 July 1859, four days after his 60th birthday. He was buried in the traditional burial site for Swedish monarchs, the Riddarholmen Church on the islet of Riddarholmen in central Stockholm. His eldest son, who had served as regent during his absence, succeeded him as Charles XV.

== Marriage and issue ==
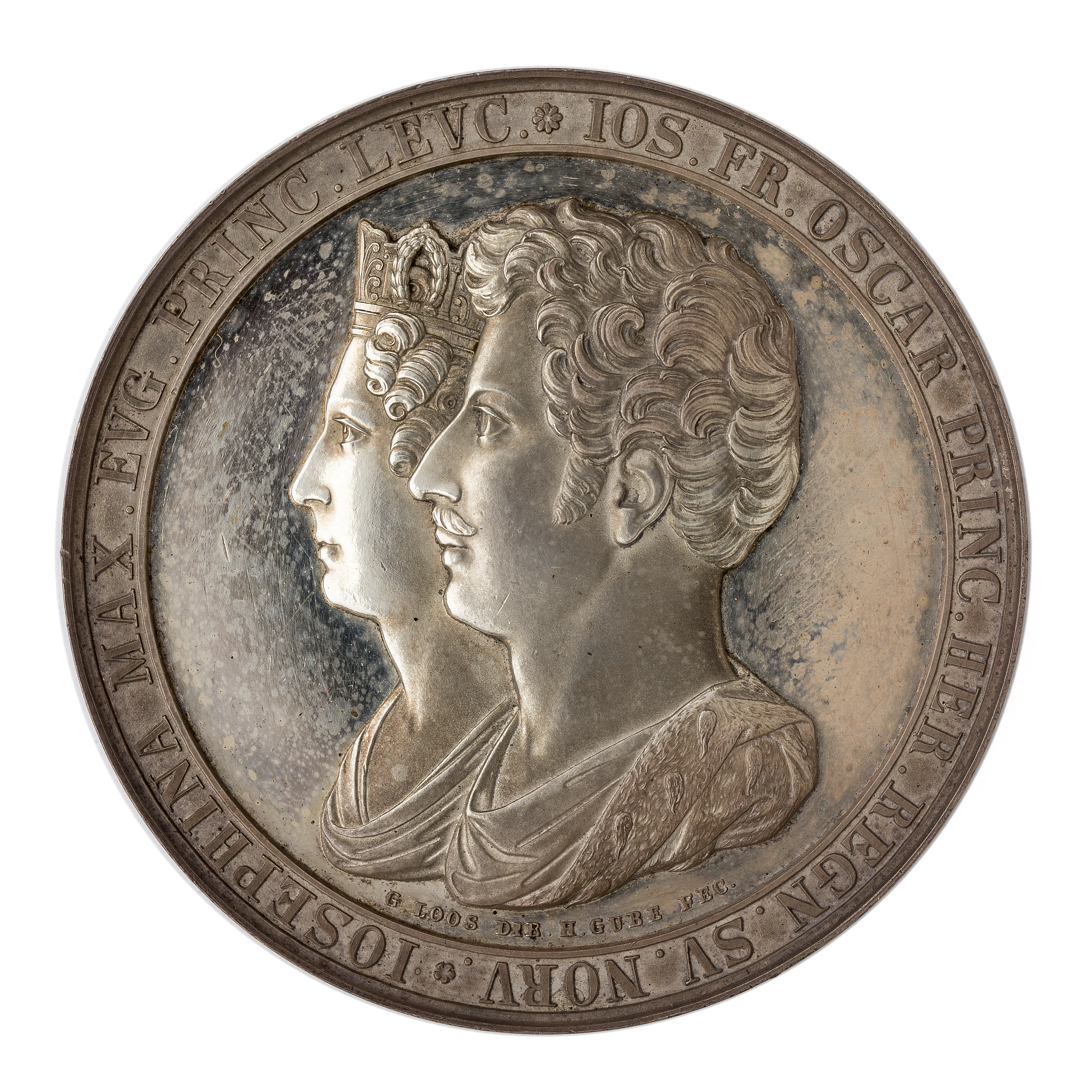
Medal for Oscar and Josephine 1829

Seeking to legitimise the new Bernadotte dynasty, Charles XIV John had selected four princesses as candidates for marriage, in order of his priority:

- Vilhelmina of Denmark (born 18 January 1808), daughter of Frederick VI of Denmark and Marie Sophie of Hesse-Kassel (ultimately she married first Frederick VII of Denmark and second Karl, Duke of Schleswig-Holstein-Sonderburg-Glücksburg)
- Josephine of Leuchtenberg (born 14 March 1807), daughter of Eugene, 1st Duke of Leuchtenberg and Augusta of Bavaria, and granddaughter of the Empress Josephine. Through her mother, she was a descendant of Gustav I of Sweden, linking the House of Bernadotte to Sweden's former royal dynasties.
- Marie of Hesse-Kassel (born 6 September 1804), daughter of William II, Elector of Hesse and Augusta of Prussia (ultimately she married Bernard II of Saxe-Meiningen)
- Marie of Saxe-Weimar-Eisenach (born 3 February 1808), daughter of Charles Frederick I of Saxe-Weimar and Maria Pavlovna of Russia (ultimately she married Prince Charles of Prussia)

Oscar would eventually marry Josephine, first by proxy at the Leuchtenberg Palace in Munich on 22 May 1823 and in person at a wedding ceremony conducted in Stockholm on 19 June 1823.

The couple had five children:

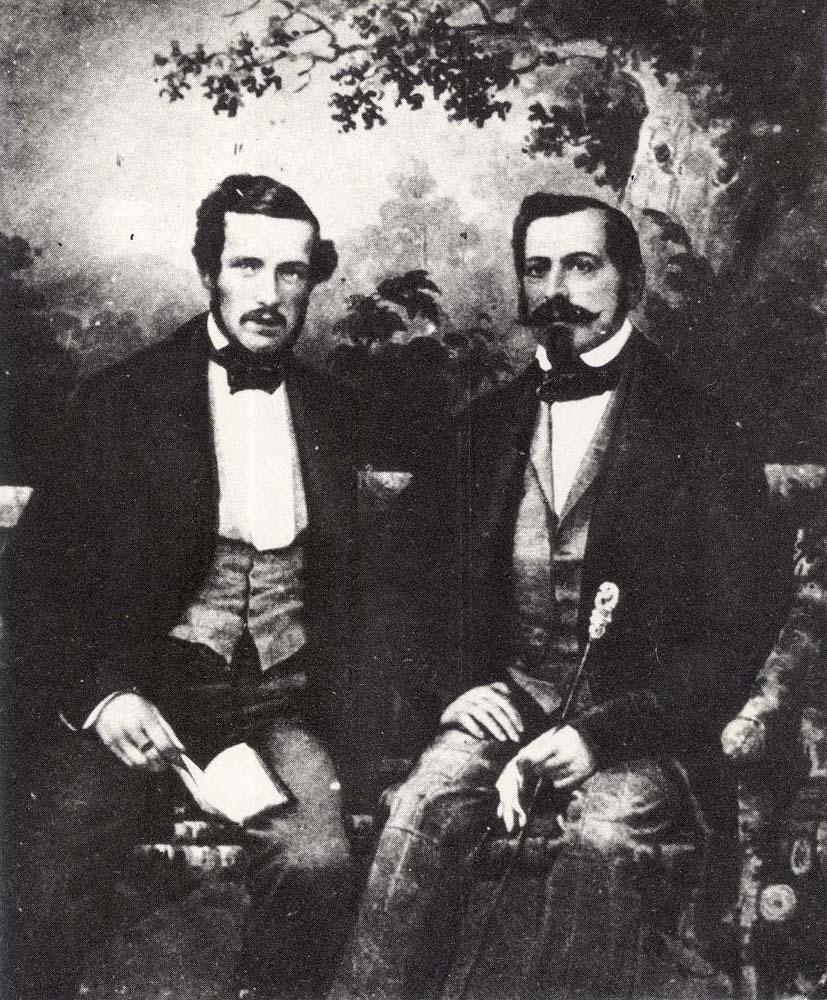
Photograph of Oscar I (right) and his son Prince Gustaf (left), c. 1852

- King Charles XV & IV (1826–1872)
- Prince Gustaf, Duke of Uppland (1827–1852)
- King Oscar II (1829–1907)
- Princess Eugenie (1830–1889)
- Prince August, Duke of Dalarna (1831–1873)

Oscar also had two extramarital sons (unofficially called the Princes of Lapland) by actress Emilie Högquist:

- Hjalmar Högquist, born 18 June 1839 in Hamburg, died 1874 in London.
- Max Högquist, born 12 August 1840 in Stockholm, died 1872 in China.

By Countess Jaquette Löwenhielm (née Gyldenstolpe) Oscar had a premarital daughter:

- Anna Maria Oscara Hilder née Meijergeer (1819–1880)

== Honours ==
Swedish and Norwegian honours

- Knight and Commander of the Order of the Seraphim, 26 September 1810
- Knight of the Order of Charles XIII, 26 September 1810
- Commander Grand Cross of the Order of the Sword, 26 September 1810
- Commander Grand Cross of the Order of the Polar Star, 26 September 1810
- Commander Grand Cross of the Order of Vasa, 26 September 1810
- Founder and Master of the Royal Norwegian Order of St. Olav, 21 August 1847

Foreign honours

- Kingdom of Prussia: Knight of the Order of the Black Eagle, 27 August 1811
- Russian Empire:
  - Knight of the Order of St. Andrew, 30 August 1812
  - Knight of the Order of St. Alexander Nevsky, 30 August 1812
- Denmark: Knight of the Order of the Elephant, 1 December 1835
- Spain: Knight of the Order of the Golden Fleece, 15 June 1844
- Kingdom of Bavaria: Knight of the Order of St. Hubert, 1844
- (Hohenzollern-Sigmaringen) Hohenzollern: Cross of Honour of the Princely House Order of Hohenzollern, 1st Class
- Baden:
  - Knight of the House Order of Fidelity, 1845
  - Knight Grand Cross of the Order of the Zähringer Lion, 1845
- Empire of Brazil:
  - Knight Grand Cross of the Order of the Southern Cross
  - Knight Grand Cross of the Order of the Rose
- Netherlands: Knight Grand Cross of the Military William Order, 21 June 1849
- Belgium: Grand Cordon of the Order of Leopold (military), 20 October 1849
- Kingdom of Hanover:
  - Knight of the Order of St. George, 1849
  - Knight Grand Cross of the Royal Guelphic Order
- Austrian Empire: Knight Grand Cross of the Order of St. Stephen, 1850
- Nassau: Knight of the Order of the Gold Lion of Nassau, July 1858

== Arms and monogram ==
Crown Prince, Duke of Södermanland (1818–1826)	Crown Prince, Duke of Södermanland (1826–1844)	King Oscar I of Sweden and Norway	Royal Monogram of King Oscar I of Sweden

== Notes ==
Oscar I House of Bernadotte Born: 4 July 1799 Died: 8 July 1859
Regnal titles
Preceded by Charles XIV/III John	King of Sweden and Norway; 1844–1859	Succeeded by Charles XV/IV
Swedish royalty
Preceded by Charles XIII/II	Duke of Södermanland	Succeeded by Charles Oscar
Italian nobility
Preceded by Josephine	Duke of Galliera with Josephine; 1823–1837	Succeeded by Raffaele de Ferrari
