= Josephine of Leuchtenberg =

Queen of Sweden and Norway from 1844 to 1859

- Princess of Bologna, Duchess of Galliera
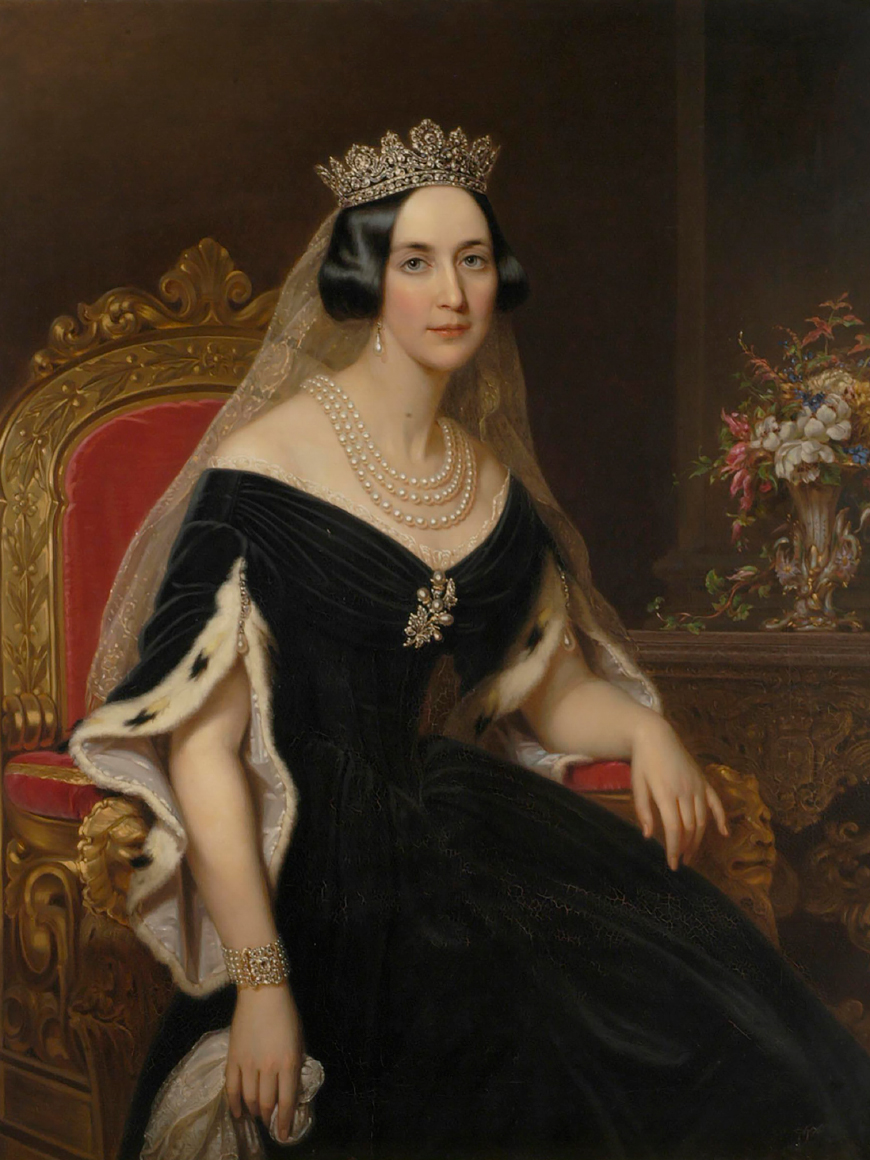
- Portrait by Friedrich Dürck, c. 1858

Queen consort of Sweden and Norway
- Tenure: 8 March 1844 – 8 July 1859
- Coronation: 28 September 1844, Stockholm
- Born: 14 March 1807; Milan, Napoleonic Kingdom of Italy
- Died: 7 June 1876 (aged 69); Stockholm, Sweden
- Burial: Riddarholmen Church
- Spouse: Oscar I of Sweden (m. 1823; died 1859)
- Issue: Charles XV of Sweden; Prince Gustaf, Duke of Uppland; Oscar II of Sweden; Princess Eugenie; Prince August, Duke of Dalarna
Names
- Joséphine Maximiliane Eugénie Napoléonne de Beauharnais
- House: Beauharnais
- Father: Eugène de Beauharnais
- Mother: Princess Augusta of Bavaria
- Religion: Catholic Church

Josephine of Leuchtenberg (Joséphine Maximilienne Eugénie Napoléone de Beauharnais; 14 March 1807 – 7 June 1876), also Josefina, was Queen of Sweden and Norway from 8 March 1844 to 8 July 1859 as the wife of King Oscar I. She was also Princess of Bologna from birth and Duchess of Galliera from 1813. She was regarded as politically active during the reign of her spouse and acted as his political adviser, actively participating in government affairs. She is acknowledged as having introduced more liberal laws regarding religion.

== Early life ==
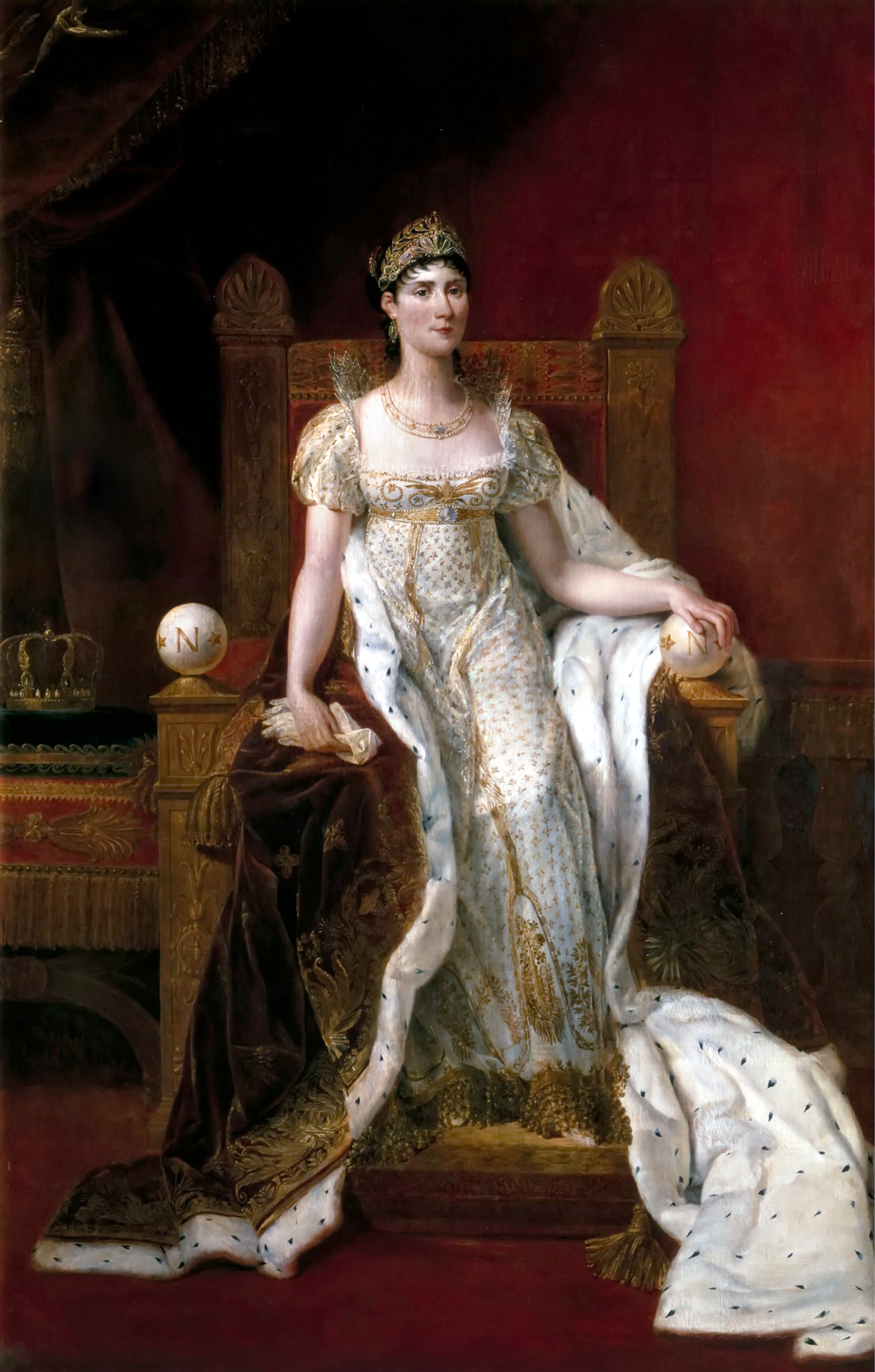
Portrait of Empress Joséphine by Guillaume Guillon-Lethière (1807), paternal grandmother of Joséphine of Leuchtenberg

Joséphine was born on 14 March 1807 in Milan, Italy. She was the first of six children of Eugène de Beauharnais, Duke of Leuchtenberg (1781–1824), and his wife, Princess Augusta of Bavaria (1788–1851). Her paternal grandmother and namesake was Joséphine Tascher de La Pagerie, the first wife of Napoleon; she was given the name 'Joséphine' by Napoleon's request. Her maternal grandfather was King Maximilian I Joseph of Bavaria.

At birth, she was given the title Princess of Bologna by Napoleon, and later she was also made Duchess of Galliera. She spent her first seven years in Italy. The family spent their days in Villa Bonaparte in Milan and at their summer residence in Monza outside Milan. In 1812, they received a visit from the former Empress Joséphine. In 1813, her father Eugène turned down the offer from his father-in-law to join the forces against Napoleon. In 1814, Augusta joined her father at his military headquarters at Mantua, where she gave birth to Théodolinde de Beauharnais, Joséphine's youngest sister. A little later, Joséphine and her siblings joined their mother in the fortress at Mantua in a procession of carriages with their courtiers. After the defeat of Napoleon that same year, her parents left for her maternal grandfather in Bavaria, and a little later, Joséphine and her siblings followed them in the company of Baron Darnay, earlier her father's secretary. Reportedly, this was a memory that stayed with Joséphine. Her father was given the title Duke of Leuchtenberg and the former principality of Eichstätt in Bavaria as a fief. Her childhood is described as happy. The family spent their summers at Eichstätt and their winters in Munich with Augusta's family.

== Education ==
Joséphine could speak French, German and Italian and studied history and geography with Professor Le Sage; botany and natural science with Professor Martinus; mathematics, physics and astronomy with Professor Siebers.

== Marriage to the Crown Prince of Sweden and Norway ==
Charles XIV John of Sweden feared the legitimist policy of the Congress of Vienna, and wished to give the House of Bernadotte connections through blood with old royal dynasties of Europe. The marriage of his son and heir to the throne, Crown Prince Oscar, was the solution to this problem, and in 1822, he finally forced his son to agree to marry and to make a trip to Europe to inspect a list of potential candidates for the position of Crown Princess and Queen. In this list, a Princess of Denmark was the first alternative; a Princess of Leuchtenberg was the second; a Princess of Hesse was the third and a Princess of Weimar was the fourth. Charles XIV John had chosen Joséphine of Leuchtenberg as candidate number two, because she had connections both to the old dynasties of Europe through her mother, and to the House of Bonaparte through her father, and thus, she "joined the new interests with the old", as he expressed the matter.

=== Engagement and wedding ===
Crown Prince Oscar declined marriage to a Danish Princess, but expressed his interest in the Princess of Leuchtenberg after his first meeting with Joséphine on 23 August 1822 in Eichstätt. The couple reportedly developed a mutual attraction and fell in love when they saw each other, and therefore, the marriage was accepted by both families and duly arranged. Joséphine took lessons in the Swedish language and corresponded with Oscar until the wedding. Her father was reportedly not against her conversion to Lutheranism, but the Swedish representatives had apparently thought it necessary to offer her the option to keep her religion. Although she was a devout Catholic, she agreed to raise her children in the Lutheran religion. She brought a Catholic priest, and regularly attended mass and confession in her private Catholic chapel. The Pope had given his consent to this. In Sweden, the law of 1781, Toleransediktet, declared freedom of religion for foreigners and immigrants, and Joséphine, as well as her mother-in-law Désirée, could be regarded as such. For Swedes, however, the conversion from the Lutheran Church to another religion formally meant confiscation of property and banishment from the country. The situation in Norway was similar. The Lutheran clergy was against the match, but the King had his way.

Portrait of Josephine of Leuchtenberg (1823) by Joseph Karl Stieler

Princess Joséphine married the Crown Prince by proxy at the Palais Leuchtenberg in Munich on 22 May 1823. They also conducted a wedding ceremony in person on 19 June 1823 in Stockholm, Sweden. The first wedding ceremony was Catholic, and the second wedding ceremony was Lutheran. Through her mother (her maternal line of Hesse and upward through Hanau and Ansbach, Baden-Durlach and Kleeburg), Joséphine was a descendant of Charles IX of Sweden through a sister of Charles X Gustav of Sweden, making her children descendants of Gustav Vasa. Through her maternal grandfather, Maximilian I Joseph of Bavaria, she was also one of the descendants of Renata of Lorraine, granddaughter of Christian II of Denmark.

Painting depicting the 1823 wedding of Crown Prince Oscar and Princess Josephine

Joséphine arrived in Sweden in the company of her mother-in-law, Queen Desideria, who had been absent for eleven years. They arrived in Manilla outside Stockholm 13 June 1823, where they were welcomed by King Charles XIV John, Crown Prince Oscar, military salutes and great crowds, and escorted to Haga Palace, where Joséphine was embraced by Princess Sophia Albertina, Abbess of Quedlinburg. The second wedding ceremony took place six days later. Six days after her arrival in Sweden, her middle name 'Napoléonne' was removed. This was because Sweden had fought against Bonaparte in the recent war. She had brought with her several pieces of exclusive jewelry made in Paris for her paternal grandmother, which are still among the possessions of the Royal Houses of Sweden, Denmark and Norway (via Louise and Märtha of Sweden). In Sweden, she was known by the Swedish version of her name: Josefina. In her retinue, she brought with her Bertha Zück, who she made her treasurer, and her Catholic confessor Jacob Lorenz Studach: until their death, they enjoyed such a close relationship that they were referred to as "The Trio". Joséphine was escorted to Sweden by a temporary lady-in-waiting, Countess Aurora Wilhelmina Brahe, but once arrived, Countess Elisabet Charlotta Piper and, from 1836, Countess Charlotta Skjöldebrand served as her Överhovmästarinna or senior lady-in-waiting.

== Crown Princess ==
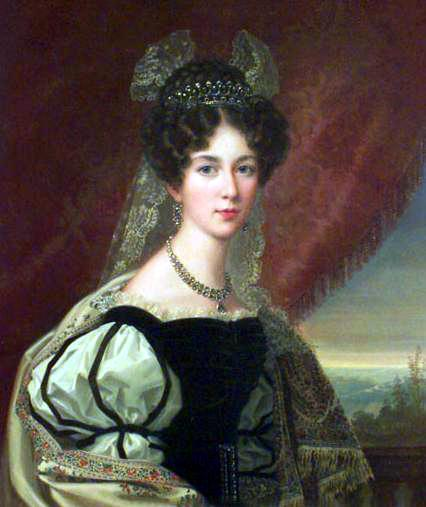
Josephine of Leuchtenberg as crown princess, by Fredric Westin.

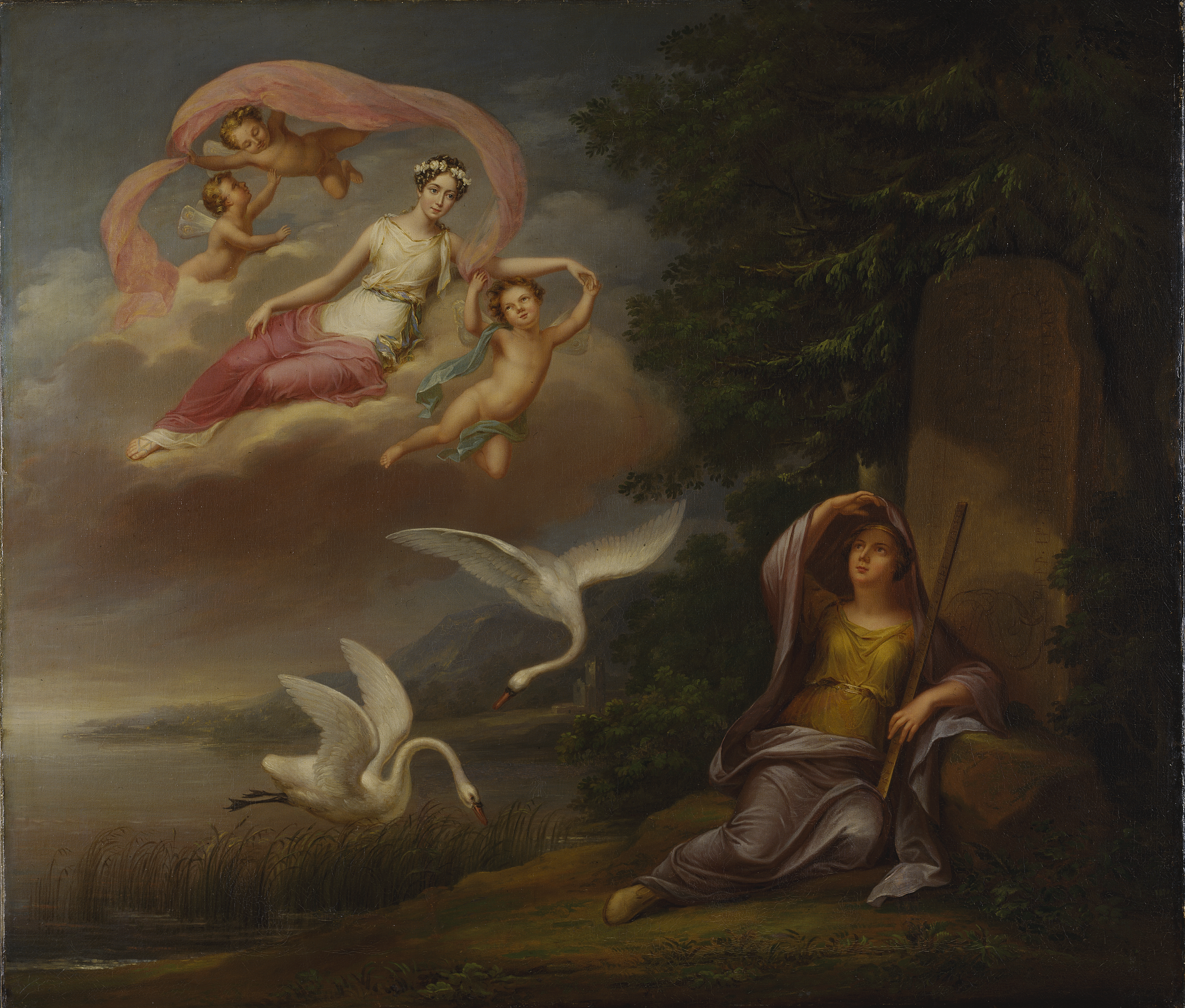
Allegory of her arrival in Sweden (1824), by Fredric Westin.

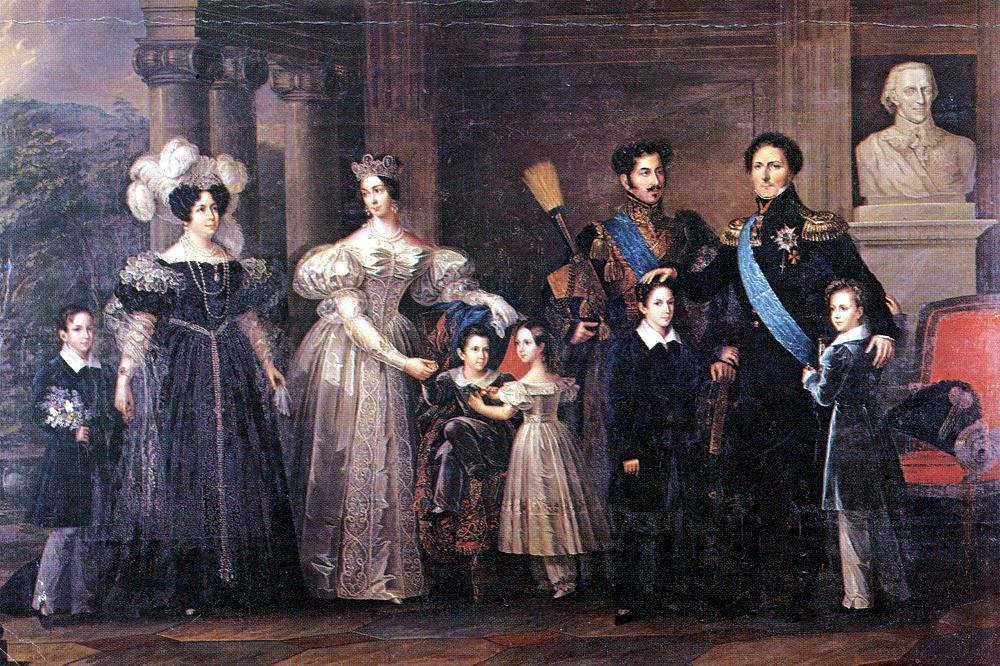
The royal family in 1837. Josephine is pictured dressed in white. Painting by Fredric Westin.

Josephine was a social success in Sweden from the moment of her arrival, both as a private person in the circles of high society as well as a public person, and was to become more popular as Queen than her predecessor and successor. Already as Crown Princess, she was able to play the representational part that her mother-in-law was not able to fulfill, and she played a great role in making the new dynasty popular in Sweden. In the summer of 1824, the Crown Prince and Crown Princess visited Christiania in Norway, where they engaged in many public appearances to make the monarchy popular. Oscar had been given the task of temporary Viceroy during his visit, and Josephine was present in a box when he appeared before the Storting. After this, they made a trip through Sweden to present her to the public. She was described as charming, beautiful and dignified, and she was also regarded as gifted: she impressed by being able to speak the Swedish language almost fluently at her arrival. At a ball in 1838 Fritz von Dardel described her: "As for the Crown Princess, she was beautiful and dignified, perhaps too thin but very intelligent and quite delightful toward all. No one has anything to reproach her for other than for her Catholic religion."

Her relationship to her father-in-law was very warm. The King treated her with great affection and, for example, used to hide sweets in his pockets, which she searched through and, at one occasion, found a jewel hidden in a sweet. On 21 August 1823, Charles XIV John declared that this day, the same date he had been elected Crown Prince, should be the name day for Josephine, and henceforth be celebrated as Josephine-Day. The first such celebration took place that day at Drottningholm Palace, and Josephine Day was celebrated in Sweden for decades after that: it became a tradition for the public in Stockholm to travel to Drottningholm Palace at that day, where festivities had been arranged for them, and cheer for Josephine, who greeted them from a balcony.

Her relationship with her mother-in-law, however, was somewhat tense during the first years, as Queen Désirée reportedly felt neglected by her spouse, and that her place as a Queen was overshadowed by Josephine's popularity. After the initial years, however, the relationship between Josephine and Désirée became more friendly and harmonious.

The relationship between Josephine and Oscar was initially described as a mutually happy one, and the couple shared their interests in culture, painting, writing and singing. Oscar and Josephine had five children, of whom two were to become kings of Sweden and Norway. However, Oscar was known for his extramarital affairs, a fact that deeply tormented Josephine. Oscar was to resume his contact with Jacquette Löwenhielm after the wedding, though Josephine is initially not believed to have been aware of this: however, in 1826, she gave the first signs of being aware of his affairs in her diary, and in 1828, she wrote of painful suspicions of adultery and also that it pained her to be constantly pregnant. In 1832, a year after the birth of her last child, she wrote in her diary about the contemporary view that a woman was expected to endure a husband's extramarital affairs: A woman should suffer in silence, and that she found this contemporary view unjust. In 1835, her pain over Oscar's behavior caused her to take a trip to the spa Medevi to calm her nerves. Her husband's relationship with the famed actress Emilie Högquist was well known. It was also not a temporary affair, but a serious relationship, which began in 1836 and resulted in two sons. Josephine described the years of Oscar's relationship with Emilie Högquist as a walk "through fire". Josephine and Oscar, however, continued to appear together in public, and her dignified behavior placed the sympathies on her side. Oscar became unpopular because of it, and King Charles XIV John reprimanded him for it out of sympathy for Josephine's suffering. During her later years as Crown Princess, this situation, which contributed to a conflict between the monarch and the Crown Prince, introduced Josephine to politics as she became active as a mediator between her spouse and her father-in-law.

Josephine was interested in gardening and painting. Her interest in art was active and genuine. She supported the career of the painter (and Catholic convert) Sofia Adlersparre, and also encouraged the artistic interest and talent of her own daughter, Princess Eugénie, who became a talented amateur artist. In 1836, she received a visit from her mother and her brother and two sisters. In 1843, she visited her mother in Munich.

Josephine was very much involved in social reforms and philanthropy. At her arrival in Sweden, she formed a close relationship with Princess Sophia Albertine of Sweden, who introduced her to this work by engaging her in Välgörande Fruntimmerssällskapet (The Charitable Women's Society) for the support of poor women. After the death of Sophia Albertine, she took over the protection of this organization, as she would do for the charity organizations of Queen Désirée and her daughter-in-law Queen Louise after their deaths. She also founded several charitable organizations herself. Already as a Crown Princess, she received petitioners asking for help twice a week, and her activity expanded over the years. Her main focus was the support of poor women and children. She founded the Sällskapet de fattigas vänner ('Friends of the Poor Society') for poor widows in 1826; Sällskapet för uppmuntran av öm och sedlig modersvård ('Society for Tender and Proper Motherly care') for the support of poor mothers in 1827; Sällskapet för arbetsamhetens uppmuntran ('Society for Work Encouagement'), an employment agency for women in 1833; and Kronprinsessans slöjdskola för fattiga flickor ('The Crown Princess's Handcrafts School for Poor Girls'). . Josephine, though deeply religious and influenced by the Christian idea of charity, did not believe it to be the task of religion but of the state to provide welfare, and she kept the two issues separate in her charity work. In her library, there were works about early Christian socialism, which appear to have been thoroughly read.

Josephine had her own Catholic chapel at the Royal Palace. Privately, she is known to have tried to influence her mother-in-law to be more than a Catholic in name only: in 1844, her confessor stated that she had managed to convince her mother-in-law to attend confession for the first time in fifty years. Oscar always supported her religious rights, regardless of their personal relationship. As for the children, she could not interfere in their religion, however, she did speak with them of religion: she and her confessor sorted out everything they could find mutual in Catholicism and Lutheranism, and about these things, she felt free to talk about with her children without interfering.

Josephine took a great interest in Catholicism in Sweden and Norway. Upon her arrival, she found the Catholic congregation in Stockholm to be neglected. Among other things, it did not have a proper church building, and she felt that the current Catholic priest, Jean Baptiste Gridaine, who was also the confessor of her mother-in-law, damaged the reputation of the Catholics because of it. Upon the death of Gridaine in 1833, he was replaced by her own confessor Studach. 16 September 1837, the Sankta Eugenia Church in Stockholm was founded in her presence, the effort of her and Studach's work: this was the first Catholic church in Scandinavia since the Reformation, and became the first apostolic vicariate in Scandinavia: Norway was incorporated in 1841. She attended mass there herself on Sundays.

== Queen of Sweden and Norway ==
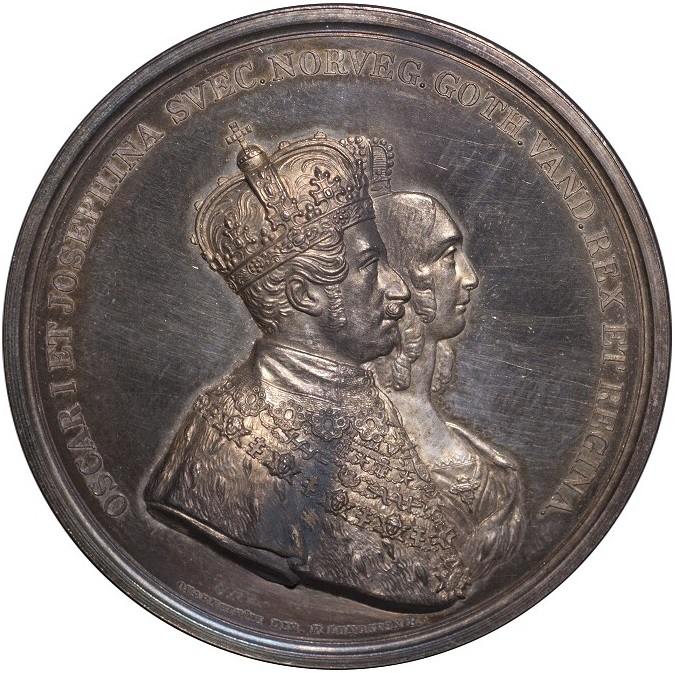
Coronation medal of Queen Josephine and King Oscar in 1844

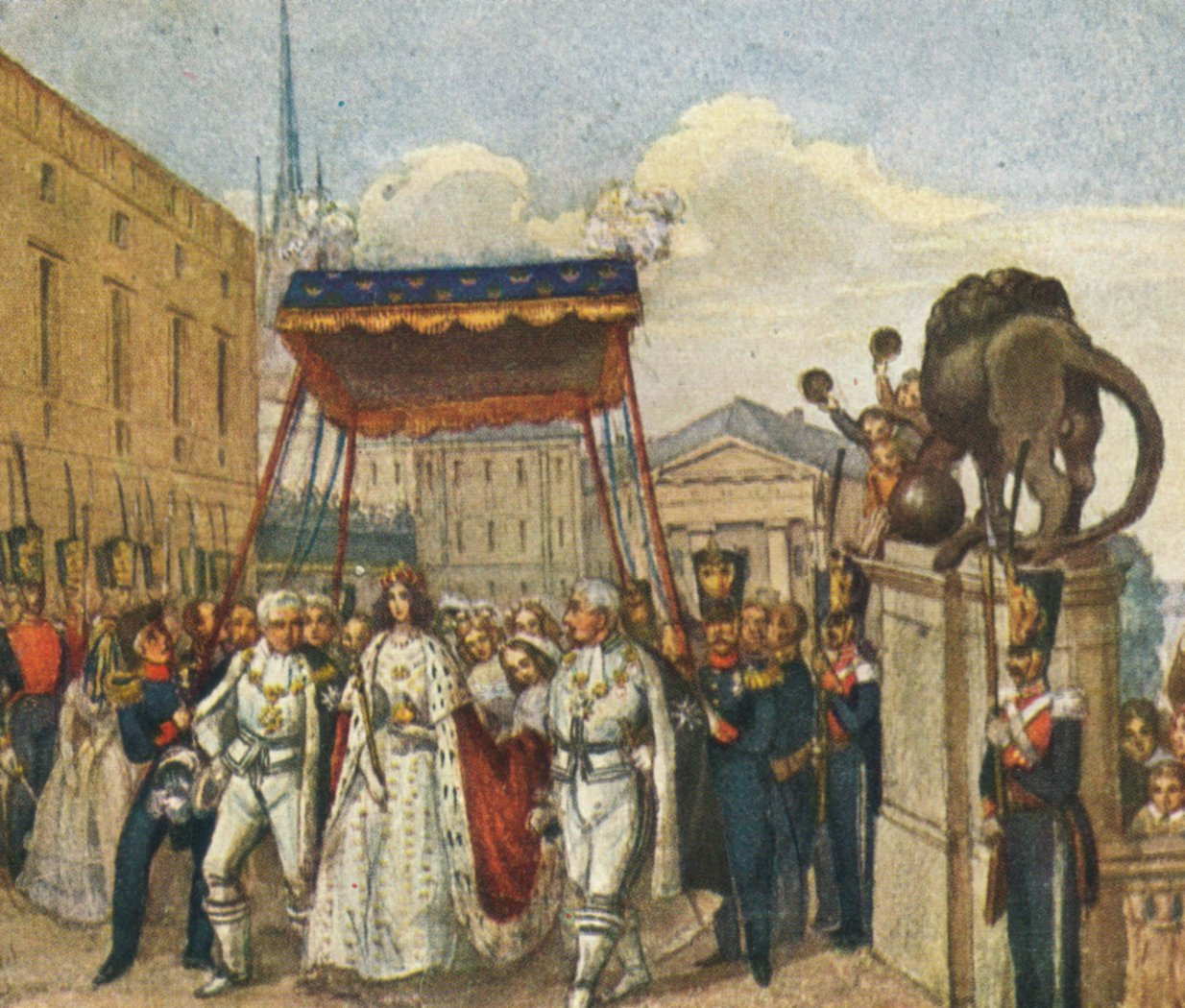
Coronation 28 September 1844

In 1844, Josephine became Queen of Sweden and Norway at the accession of her spouse. She was crowned in Sweden 28 September 1844. There had been some opposition: the religious debate was more heated in the 1840s than it had been in 1829, when Queen Desideria had been crowned, but Oscar solved the matter by declaring that he would not be crowned himself if she was not. In Norway, there was more serious opposition to the coronation of a Catholic. The official reason was that the ceremony was unnecessary, as the queen had no position in the Norwegian constitution, but it is acknowledged that the real reason was her religion: Queen Desideria had in fact not been crowned in Norway either. Because of this, Oscar refused to be crowned in Norway as well.

At the time Josephine became queen, Fredrika Bremer wrote of her, that she: "... prefers to act out of her own pulse and will. Granted, I have not heard this from court, but I believe it to be the truth. Out of the two royal spouses, she is, without question, believed to be the stronger character." After Oscar ascended to the throne, he discontinued extramarital affairs. The relationship between Josephine and Oscar was repaired, and continued to be good during his reign and until his death. The degree of her political influence during the reign of Oscar is debated. She was said to have acted as his adviser and to have exerted influence in several matters. Reportedly, Oscar felt pressured by his responsibility, and relied upon her support. It is confirmed that, when a crisis occurred, the king and the queen withdrew in private to discuss the matter before the king made a decision. Their private conferences were witnessed by the curious court, who could sometimes observe them discussing the matter in the palace garden out of hearing range.

Foreign policy can be seen to have been affected by her sympathies and views. In her correspondence with her aunt, the Prussian queen Elisabeth Ludovika of Bavaria, it is evident that she actively negotiated for peace in the First Schleswig War of 1848. During the war, she informed her aunt that Sweden had decided to assist Denmark against Prussia to defend its independence, and that she hoped that Prussia would be willing to engage in peace negotiations. The result was that Prussia had Count Albert von Pourtalès sent to Sweden to enter in peace negotiations with Josephine personally. In parallel, she assured the Queen and King of Prussia of her personal regard and offered them a safe haven if they should ever be forced out of Prussia. She is confirmed to have played an important part in the secret diplomacy of Oscar I, where she also promoted her younger son, Oscar, before her elder son Charles. Her contact with Emperor Napoleon III and Empress Eugenie of the French is regarded to have been of certain importance during the 1850s European crisis. Josephine was by referred to as pro-French and anti-Russian. She was pointed out, among others by her son, Charles, to have been responsible for the November treaty between Sweden-Norway, France and Great Britain against Russian expansionism in 1855.

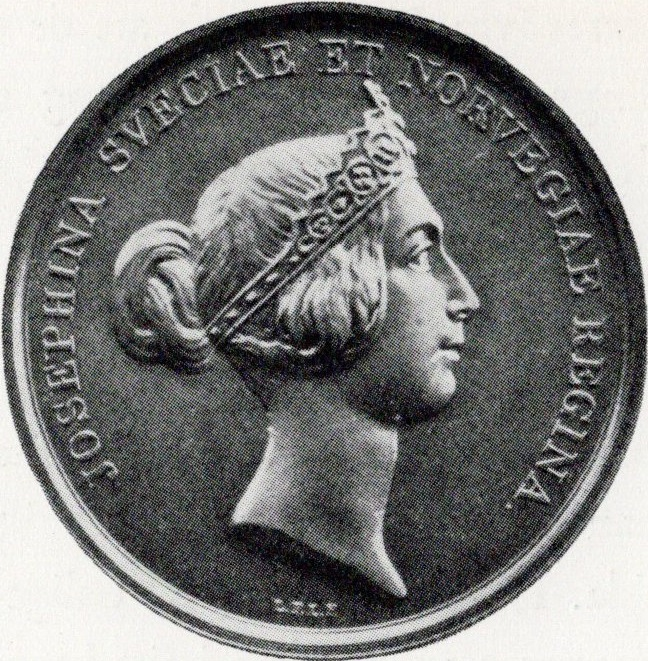
Medal for Queen Josephine in 1845

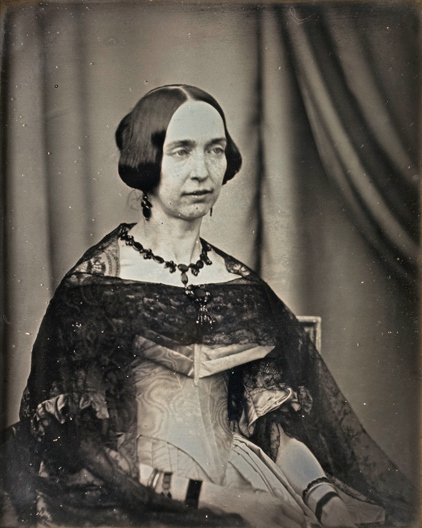
Daguerreotype of Queen Josephine by J. W. Bergström

Josephine is thought to have been the instigator of the laws providing equal inheritance for men and women in 1845, reforms in the prisons and social care, and the abolition of the guilds in 1846. During the European Revolutions of 1848, riots broke out in Stockholm 19 March 1848, called Marsoroligheterna, and continued for four days. Rebels on the streets demanded a Republic and tried to cause an armed rebellion. The royal family was, according to Count Löwenhielm, pale and seriously worried when he visited them at the time. Josephine reportedly asked Oscar not to fire at the crowds during the riots. Eventually, however, the riots were subdued with fire by the military. With the exception of suspicion in the religious question, however, Josephine's involvement in politics does not appear to have been ill-regarded, but rather she was considered as a good influence.

Her Catholicism was the only thing which somewhat affected her popularity within some circles of society. Her religion combined with her reputed political activity caused rumours that she exerted undue influence in regards to religious issues. By the 1840s, there was an intense political debate about freedom of religion, which in parallel caused more anti-Catholicism in a country where the attitude had previously been indifferent, and this exposed Josephine more or less direct attacks in the press. She did in fact use her influence for the benefit of the Catholics, and she cooperated with Pope Gregory XVI in this issue. Josephine is believed to have been behind several laws regarding the religious policies. From 1851, she supported the first female Catholic order to be active in Sweden since the reformation, when the nuns of the Filles du Coer de Marie established themselves in Stockholm to take care of the Catholic children's schooling. In 1853–1854, Swedish Lutherans were given the permission to attend Catholic sermons.

In 1853, there was a case where six Swedish women were reported to have converted to the Catholic faith. Josephine, who was at the time working to introduce freedom of religion, asked Oscar to convince the minister of religion to postpone the investigation against the women. This was also done. In 1856, Oscar expressed himself in favor of freedom of religion. However, in 1857, Oscar became ill and incapacitated, and Crown Prince Charles became regent. Charles, who was anti-Catholic, worked against his mother's plans, and used the help of people such as the vicar Nils Johan Ekdahl, who belonged to the opponents of the Queen because of her religion and political influence. Ekdahl preached during this time, that as there had been no tolerance for Queen Christina of Sweden, who had been a Swede and a queen regnant and converted to Catholicism: "...so much less would it be for a foreign Queen, who entered the nation by marriage". The six female converts were put on trial in 1858, after which they were banished and had their property was confiscated. However, by that time, that old law was considered to shame the reputation of Sweden and the banishment a scandal, and in 1860, Charles saw himself obliged to finally introduce freedom of religion. The female converts, who emigrated to Lyon in France, returned to Sweden after the introduction of freedom of religion.

Josephine was also Queen of Norway. She reportedly appreciated the Norwegian nature as it reminded her of Bavaria. She greatly influenced the interior of the Royal Palace in Christiania, which was completed in 1849, took an interest in Norwegian art and often visited art exhibitions in Christiania. The Oscarshall Palace was reportedly mostly inspired by her.

The year of 1852 has been described as hard for her: in the company of her husband, daughter Princess Eugénie and son Prince Gustaf, Duke of Uppland, she visited her mother on her death bed in Bavaria. On their way back, they visited Norway, where Gustaf died of pneumonia. In 1856, she had St. Olav Church (now St. Olav's Cathedral), the first Catholic Church since reformation, ignited in Christiania in Norway.

She had a tense relationship with her eldest son. Charles had been deeply in love with her maid of honor Sigrid Sparre. This had happened during the same time when negotiations were being conducted to marry Charles to Louise of Prussia in 1846. Josephine had separated Charles and Sparre by expelling Sparre from court in 1848, though she did not manage to save the marriage alliance with Prussia. Charles never forgave Josephine for separating him from Sparre, and further more, it also caused him to be strongly anti-Catholic, because he blamed his mother's decision on her Catholic confessor Jacob Lorenz Studach. Josephine also disliked Charles for being impulsive, economically irresponsible and morally loose. In 1852, the first time Charles served as regent, during the royal couple's trip to Germany, it was noted that she said farewell to Charles and his advisers with the remark: "Well, now we will leave, and the gentlemen will rule...", a comment perceived as cold and skeptical.

In 1857, Oscar I became ill. The illness of the monarch made it necessary for a regency, and crown prince Charles was seen as the obvious choice. Queen Josephine opposed Charles being appointed regent during the incapacity of the King. The rumors claimed that the reason was that she was aware of the fact that Charles would never allow her any influence on the affairs of state. During this time, there is a known occasion, which attracted attention. The King and the Queen showed themselves to the public in the capital in their carriage. At this point, the King was too weak to wave, but Josephine did in fact hold and moved his hand in a wave. She also nudged him to make him aware of what was happening. This caused rumors that she was afraid to lose her political position. Mathilda d'Orozco described this view in a contemporary letter where she defended the queen against it: "She is pushing the King, it is said, the poor thing, to make him greet people, when they are out. She is guarding him, not as an angel of mercy, not as a slave of duty, a martyr - no, as a virago, concerned only for her reign. This is so hard, so ungrateful...." In the autumn of 1857, she was forced to accept the appointment of Charles as regent. She gave him her appreciation for the advisers he had chosen, but this also meant the end of her political activity. Queen Josephine was admired for her selfless nursing of him the two years he was ill before his death.

== Queen dowager ==
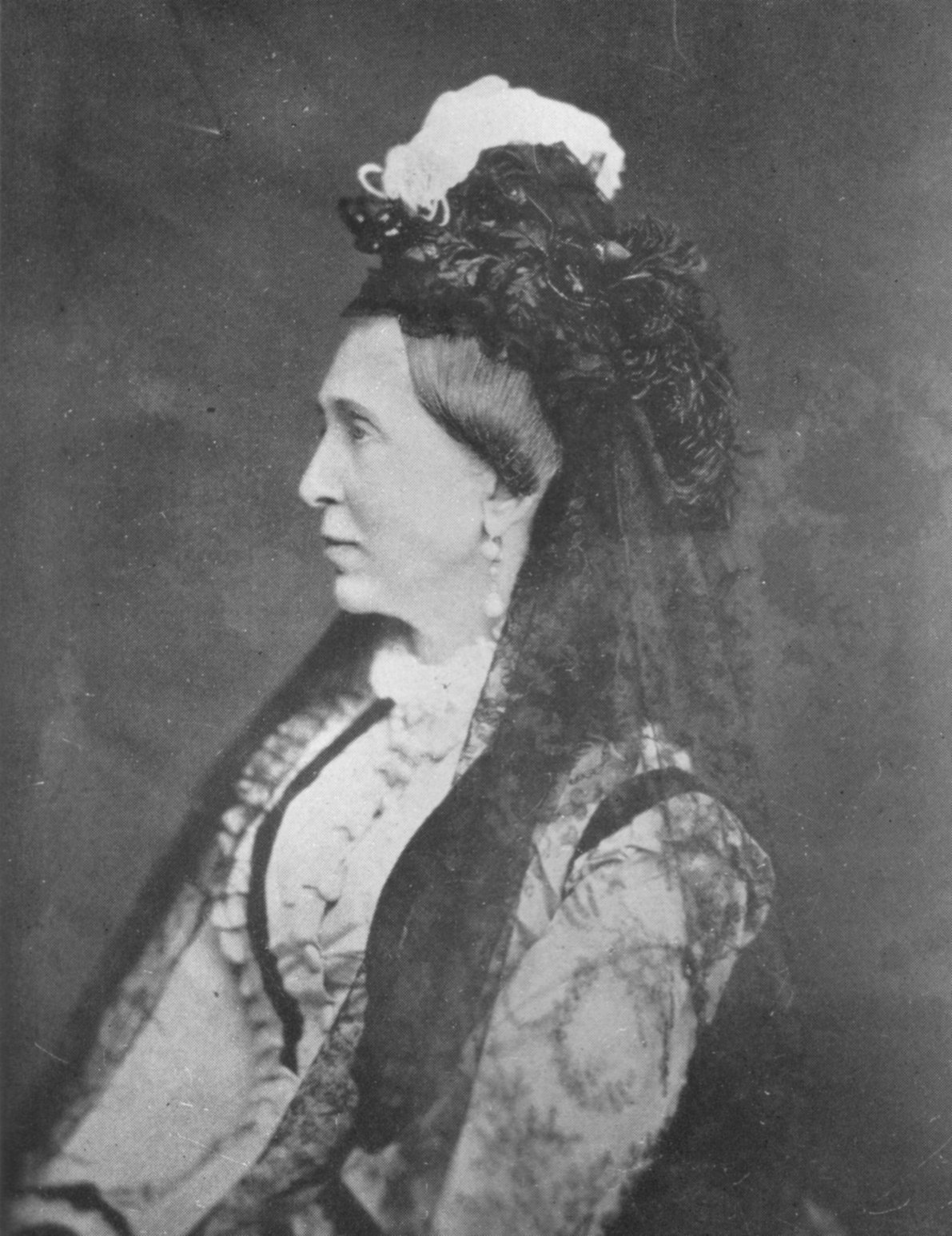
Photograph of Josephine as queen dowager (1874)

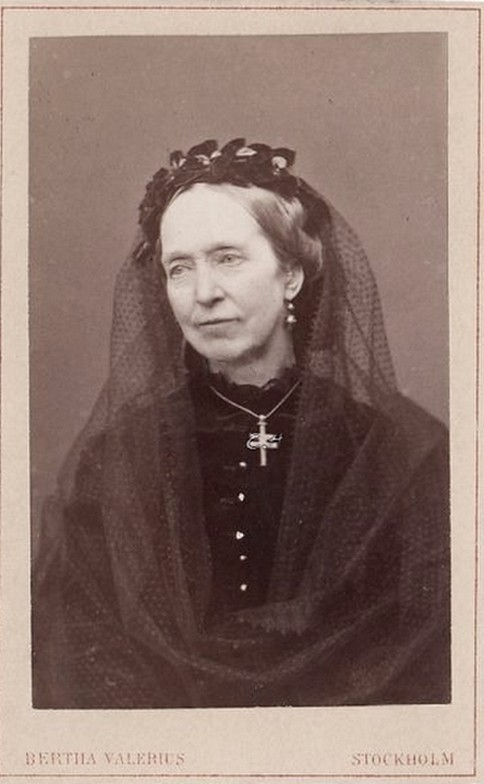
Portrait of Queen Dowager Josephine (1875), photograph by Bertha Valerius

In 1859, Oscar died, thereby making Josephine queen dowager; although she was only officially titled as such in the late 1860s, when her mother-in-law, Queen Dowager Désirée, died. It is noted, that she followed the French tradition by wearing violet as a mourning colour rather than black: violet was her favourite colour in any event, and she would wear it for the rest of her life. As queen dowager, she lost all political influence and devoted herself to her charitable activities and her interest in the Catholic congregation and its issues.

Charles XV considered her too old fashioned and formal and their views were seldom shared. Charles XV made himself known for a decadent life style: he was rumored to engage in Oriental debaucheries with the Armenian Ohan Demirgian, and his life at the summer residence Ulriksdal Palace was compared to that at Versailles, which brought the crown into disrepute, something which had also been Josephine's fear. Her relationship with Queen Louise has been described as very good. In 1866, she shared the royal couple's negative views about the parliamentary reform. Queen Dowager Josephine was known for acting as nurse during illness in the family, and her relationship with Charles improved in his last years, when his health deteriorated and he became a Freemason and thereafter saw fewer differences in Catholicism and Protestantism.

Josephine kept informed about the political events, though she could no longer affect them. In the Austro-Prussian War of 1866, she supported Austria against Prussia, whose expansionism she feared. In 1870, Josephine expressed how deeply she felt against the introduction of the new Catholic doctrine of Papal infallibility. She regarded this as a doctrine which would in high degree repulse the Catholic church in the eyes of the Protestant world. She reportedly suffered when her cousin Emperor Napoleon III of France was dethroned in 1870. After the Battle of Sedan, she assured the imprisoned Napoleon III that she would never forget that she was a member of the Beauharnais family. She invited the son of Napoleon III, the Prince Imperial, to Sweden, though he did not accept the invitation. She also expressed dislike of the annexation of the Papal States, and called 1870 a terrible year. Josephine nursed her daughter-in-law Queen Louise at her death bed in 1871.

In 1872, Charles XV died, and Josephine's younger son Oscar II succeeded to the throne. At the time of Charles' death, Josephine was on a trip to see her sister, Amélie, former Empress of Brazil, in Portugal. On the way, she visited Paris and saw King Amadeo I and Queen Maria Vittoria of Spain in El Escorial. In Lisbon, her dying sister wished for her to see the Sintra National Palace and Monserrate Palace before her return. She returned to Sweden two days after the death of Charles. Upon the death of Jacob Lorenz Studach in 1873, Josephine negotiated with the Pope about who would be the most suitable replacement for missionary Bishop of the Catholic Church in Scandinavia. She wished to have the Bishop of Speyer, Bonifatius von Haneberg. The Pope however appointed Johann Georg Huber.

Josephine supported the first post-reformation Catholic Churches in Gothenburg, Sweden in 1862 and in Bergen, Norway in 1866. In 1865, she supported the foundation of the Catholic school of the nuns of the order of Saint Joseph of Chambéry in Oslo. She founded Stiftelsen Konung Oscar I:s minne (The Foundation of the Memory of Oscar I), a home and asylum for poor married women in 1873 and Stiftelsen Josephinahemmet (The Josephine Home Foundation) a home for poor Catholics in 1873: both these institutions were managed by the nuns of the German Order of Saint Elisabeth.

On 13 June 1873, Josephine celebrated what has been called the second biggest celebration of her life, when she received the public's adoration during the celebration of her fifty years in Sweden. She was reportedly very moved, and her own words in a letter are often quoted: "This was a day of a half a century, that I shall never forget until my dying day: my heart will always keep it in fond memory... at last, my dearest friend, have I with movement witnessed, how Protestant Sweden so unanimously celebrated a Catholic Queen. I thank and praise God for it..."

In 1875, she visited Pope Pius IX in Rome, a pilgrimage she had long wished to make. She traveled incognito under the name 'Countess of Tullgarn' and in the company of only four courtiers. On 22 May 1875 she reached Rome after Berlin, Munich and Innsbruck, and received King Victor Emmanuel II of Italy, and was guided by him through town. She had a long history of contact with the Pope regarding her Catholic work in Scandinavia, and the Pope had in 1852 contemplated awarding her the Golden Rose, but refrained because he was afraid that this would be ill perceived in a Protestant country. 3 June 1875, Josephine was given communion by the Pope followed by a public dinner, alongside her niece Princess Mathilde Viano and her maid of honor Rosalie Muffat, who was the first non-royal woman to have done both. After Rome, she visited Naples, Bologna and Milan and saw former Empress Eugénie of France in Salzburg.

== Death ==
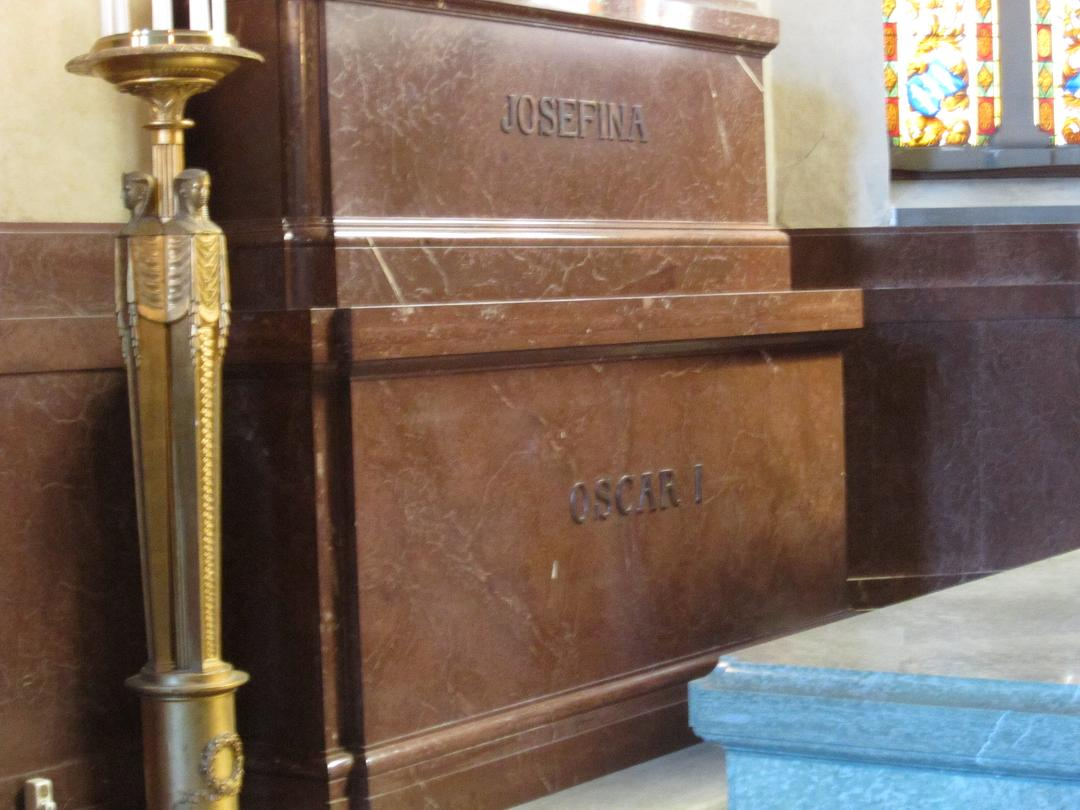
The grave of King Oscar and Queen Josephine in Riddarholm Church.

Queen Josephine died in Stockholm in 1876 at the age of 69 and received a Catholic burial. Her last words were: "I am going home now. I am very happy."

== Issue ==
Josephine had five children with Oscar; four sons and one daughter:

1. Charles XV of Sweden & IV of Norway (1826–1872)
2. Prince Gustaf, Duke of Uppland (1827–1852)
3. Oscar II of Sweden (1829–1907)
4. Princess Eugénie of Sweden and Norway (1830–1889)
5. Prince August, Duke of Dalarna (1831–1873)

== Arms and monogram ==
Josephine's Coat of Arms as Queen of Sweden and Norway

Monogram of Queen Josephine of Sweden

== Bibliography ==
- Lars O. Lagerqvist (1979). Bernadotternas drottningar (The queens of the Bernadotte dynasty) (in Swedish). Albert Bonniers Förlag AB. ISBN 91-0-042916-3.
- Lars Elgklou (1978). Bernadotte. Historien – eller historier – om en familj. (Bernadotte. The History – or histories – of a family) Stockholm: Askild & Kärnekull Förlag AB. (Swedish)
- Gunnel Becker & Kjell Blückert, red (2007). Drottning Josefina av Sverige och Norge. (Queen Josefina of Sweden and Norway) Stockholm: Veritas Förlag. ISBN 978-91-89684-44-7 (Swedish)
- Robert Braun (1950). Silvertronen, En bok om drottning Josefine av Sverige-Norge. (The Silver Throne. A Book about Queen Josefine of Sweden-Norway) Stockholm: Norlin Förlag AB. (Swedish)
- Josefina, urn:sbl:12210, Svenskt biografiskt lexikon (art av Nils F Holm), hämtad 2013-11-03.

Josephine of Leuchtenberg House of Beauharnais Born: 14 March 1807 Died: 7 June 1876
Royal titles
Preceded by Désirée Clary	Queen consort of Sweden and Norway; 1844–1859	Succeeded by Louise of the Netherlands
Italian nobility
New title	Duchess of Galliera with Oscar; 1812–1837	Succeeded by Raffaele de Ferrari
