= Prince Gustaf, Duke of Uppland =

Swedish prince (1827–1852)

Prince Gustaf
- Duke of Uppland
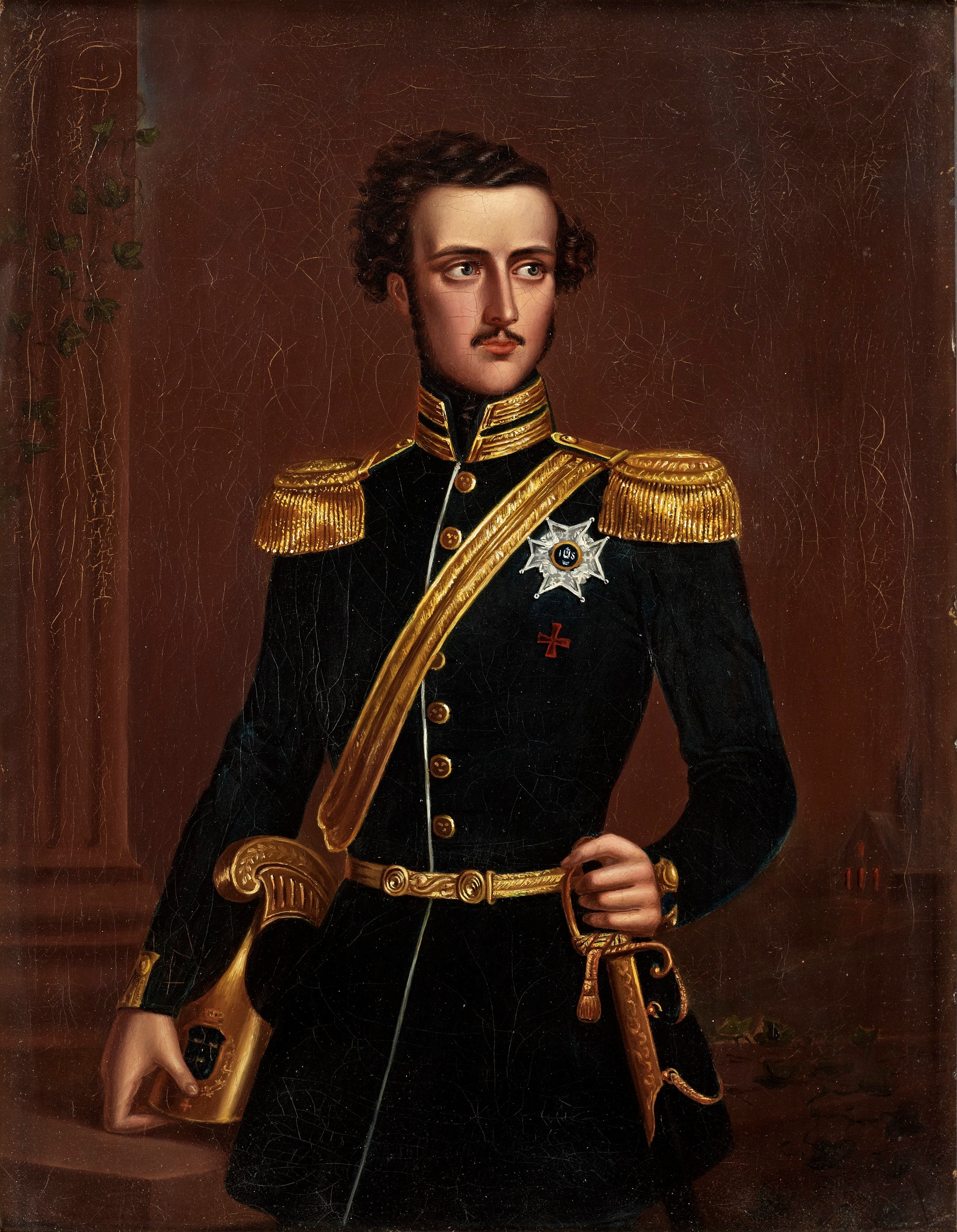
- Portrait by Friedrich Dürck, c. 1850
- Born: 18 June 1827; Haga Palace, Solna, Sweden
- Died: 24 September 1852 (aged 25); Christiania Palace, Christiania, Norway
Names
- Frans Gustaf Oscar
- House: Bernadotte
- Father: Oscar I of Sweden
- Mother: Josephine of Leuchtenberg

Prince Gustaf of Sweden and Norway, Duke of Uppland (Frans Gustaf Oscar, 18 June 1827 – 24 September 1852), also known officially as Gustav, was the second son of Oscar I of Sweden and Josephine of Leuchtenberg, and the younger brother of Prince (from 1844 Crown Prince) Charles.

== Life ==
During his childhood he was placed in the care of the royal governess countess Christina Ulrika Taube.

He was a trained musician and under the artist's name of G***** a well known composer. In Sweden, he is remembered for having written a couple of well-known songs. His The Student Song (Studentsången) is traditionally sung at the graduation festivities for gymnasium students, and his Spring Song (Vårsång) is often performed by men's choruses on Walpurgis night.

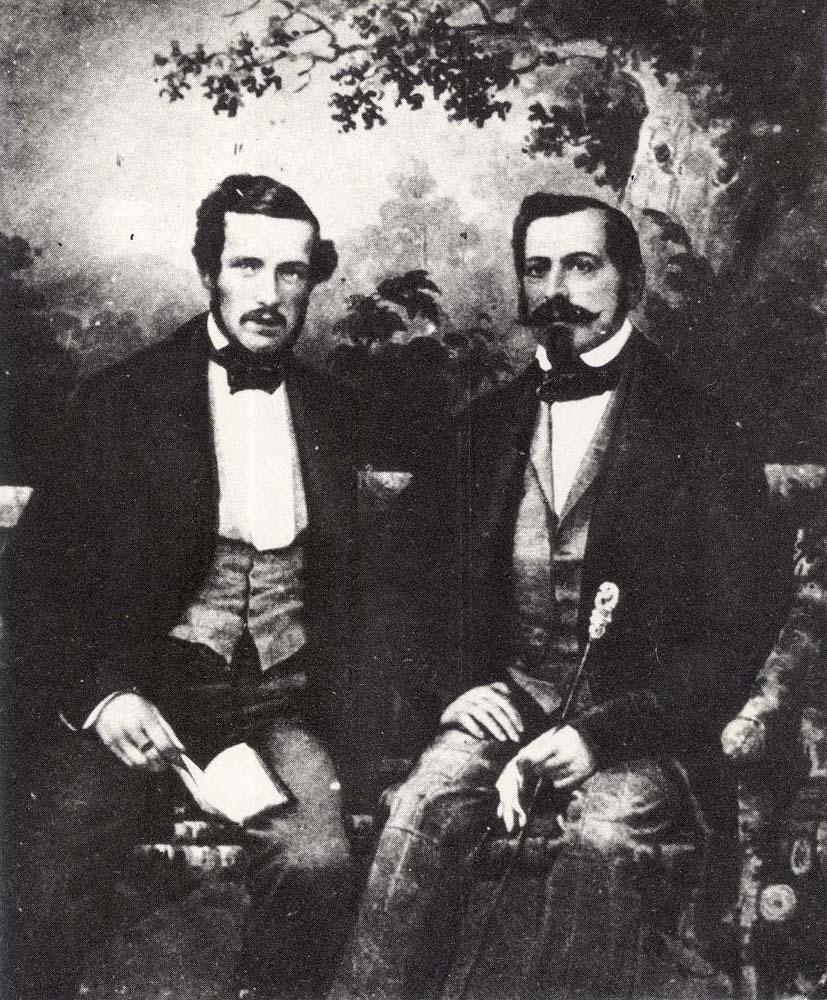
Photograph of Prince Gustaf (left) and his father Oscar I (right), c. 1852

From 1844 until his death in 1852, Gustaf was second-in-line to the Swedish and Norwegian thrones, during most of his father's reign. On 11 February 1846, he was made an honorary member of the Royal Swedish Academy of Sciences, on the same day as his brother Charles.

He died from typhoid fever.

He was portrayed by Alf Kjellin in Prince Gustaf, a 1944 film about certain aspects of the prince's life.

== Honours and arms ==
=== Honours ===
- Sweden-Norway: Knight of the Order of Charles XIII, 22 March 1849

=== Arms ===
Arms of Prince Gustaf from 1827 to 1844

Arms of Prince Gustaf after 1844

== Ancestry ==
Ancestors of Prince Gustaf, Duke of Uppland

8. Jean Henri Bernadotte
4. Charles XIV John of Sweden
9. Jeanne de Saint Vincent
2. Oscar I of Sweden
10. François Clary
5. Désirée Clary
11. Françoise Rose Somis
1. Prince Gustaf, Duke of Uppland
12. Alexandre, vicomte de Beauharnais
6. Eugène de Beauharnais, 1st Duke of Leuchtenberg
13. Joséphine de Tascher de La Pagerie
3. Princess Joséphine of Leuchtenberg
14. Maximilian I Joseph of Bavaria
7. Princess Augusta of Bavaria
15. Princess Augusta Wilhelmine of Hesse-Darmstadt
