= Monument to the Women of the Warsaw Uprising =

Monument in Warsaw, Poland

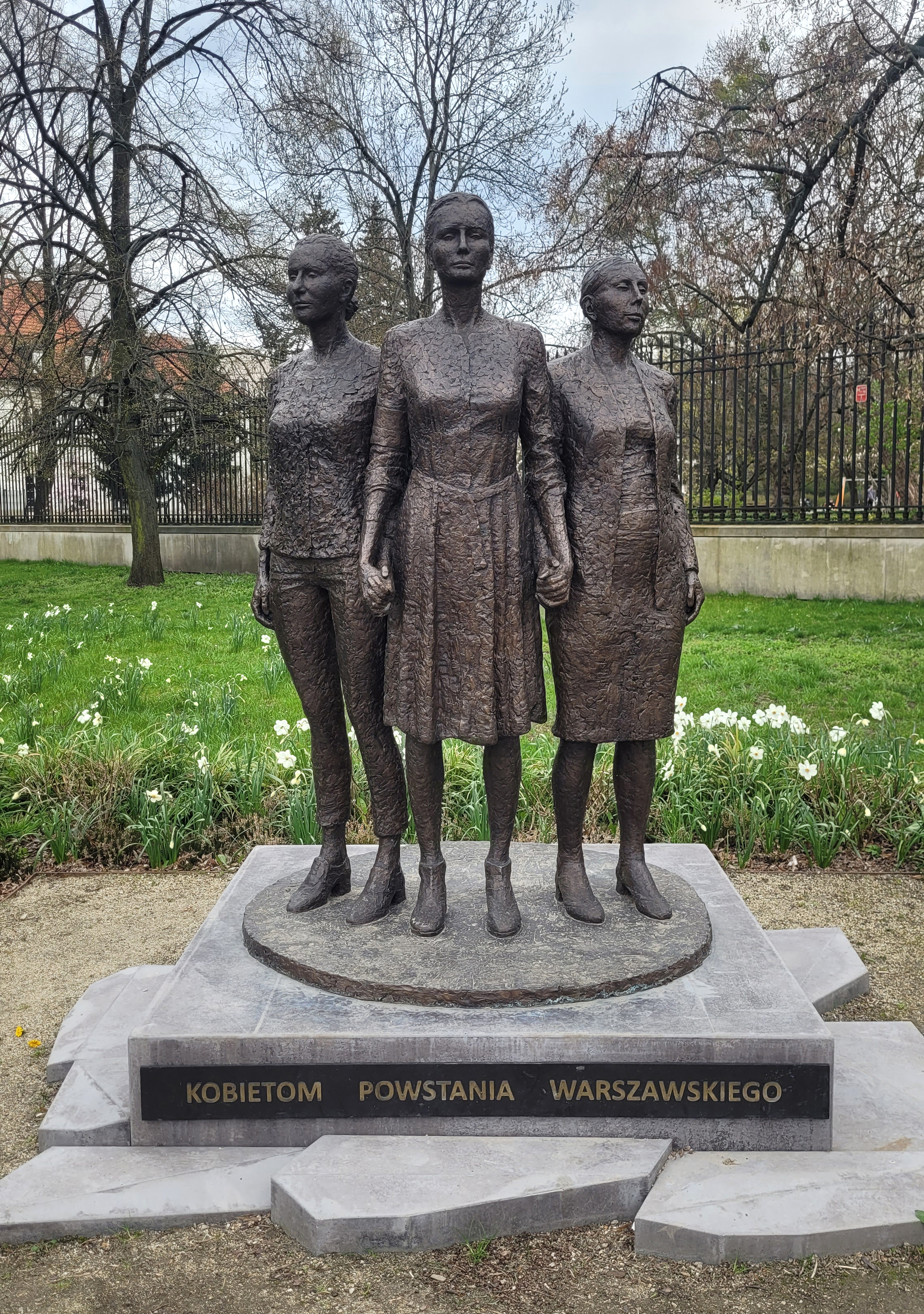
- The Monument to the Women of the Warsaw Uprising in 2023.
- Interactive map of Monument to the Women of the Warsaw Uprising
- Location: Krasiński Square, Warsaw, Poland
- Coordinates: 52°14′56.24″N 21°00′16.73″E
- Designer: Monika Osiecka
- Type: Statue
- Opening date: 2 October 2021
- Dedicated to: Women insurgents of the Warsaw Uprising

The Monument to the Women of the Warsaw Uprising (Note: Polish: Pomnik Kobietom Powstania Warszawskiego) is a monument at the Krasiński Square in Warsaw, Poland, dedicated to the women who fought in the Warsaw Uprising during World War II and the women who were its victims. It was designed by Monika Osiecka and unveiled on 2 October 2021.

== History ==
The monument was designed by Monika Osiecka and unveiled on 2 October 2021, on the 77th anniversary of the ending of the Warsaw Uprising.

== Characteristics ==
The monument is placed at the Krasiński Square, near the entrance to the Krasiński Garden. It is dedicated to the women who fought in the Warsaw Uprising during World War II and the women who were its victims.

The monument consists of statues of three women holding hands, placed on a small square pedestal. It bears the inscription Kobietom Powstania Warszawskiego (English: To the Women of the Warsaw Uprising).
