= Monument to the Soldiers of the First Polish Army =

Monument in Warsaw, Poland

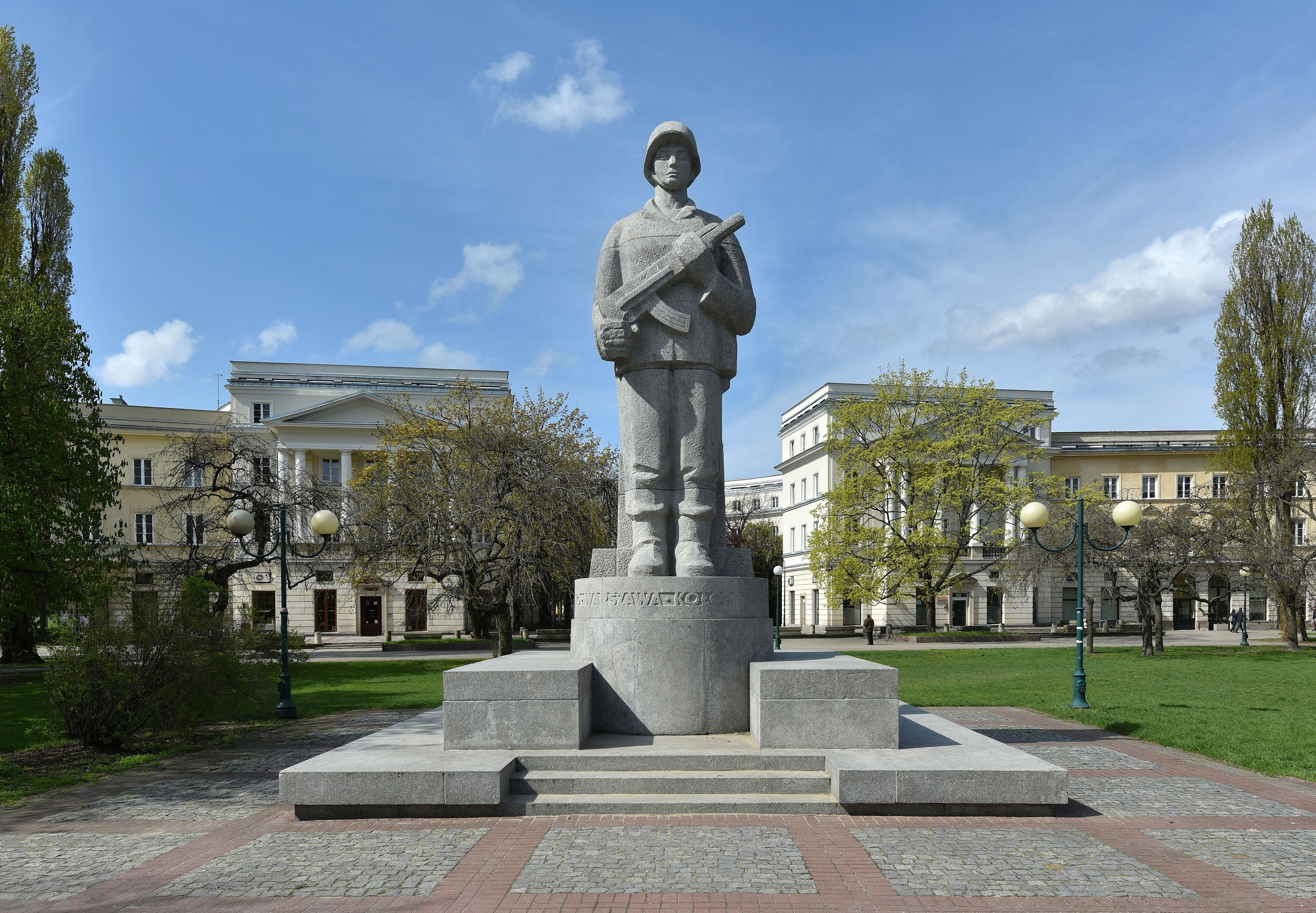
- The monument in 2017.
- Interactive map of Monument to the Soldiers of the First Polish Army
- Location: Andersa Street, Downtown, Warsaw, Poland
- Coordinates: 52°14′53.54″N 20°59′53.60″E
- Designer: Xawery Dunikowski
- Type: Statue
- Material: Granite
- Height: 8 m (26 ft)
- Opening date: 12 October 1963
- Dedicated to: Fallen soldiers of the First Polish Army

The Monument to the Soldiers of the First Polish Army (Polish: Pomnik Żołnierzy 1 Armii Wojska Polskiego) is a granite statue in Warsaw, Poland, located at Andersa Street, within the Downtown district. It is dedicated to the fallen soldiers of the First Polish Army who fought on the Eastern Front of the Second World War. The monument was designed by Xawery Dunikowski and unveiled on 12 October 1963.

== History ==
The monument was financed by the Polish Armed Forces. In 1959, a contest was organised for the design of the monument. However, no project was chosen, with sculptor Xawery Dunikowski being commissioned instead. He designed his work between 1962 and 1963, with help of Jerzy Bereś, Józef Galica, Józef Potępa. The postament and its surroundings were designed by Leon Suzin. The project was not fully finished due to Dunikowski's progressing illness, and it became his last work before his death in 1964. The monument was unveiled on 12 October 1963, on the 20th anniversary of the battle of Lenino. It was dedicated to the fallen soldiers of the First Polish Army who fought on the Eastern Front of the Second World War.

== Characteristics ==
The monument is located in the Stalinism Political Prisoners Square (Polish: Skwer Więźniów Politycznych Stalinizmu), at Andersa Street and near the Krasiński Garden. It consists of a 8-metre-tall granite statue depicting a soldier of the Polish Armed Forces in the East, wearing a military uniform and helmet, and holding a machine gun near his chest. It is placed on a granite pedestal, with the following Polish inspiration: "1943 – Lenino, Warszawa [Warsaw], Kołobrzeg, Berlin – 1945", marking the route of the army in the conflict.
