= Krasiński Garden Pond =

Artificial lake in Warsaw, Poland

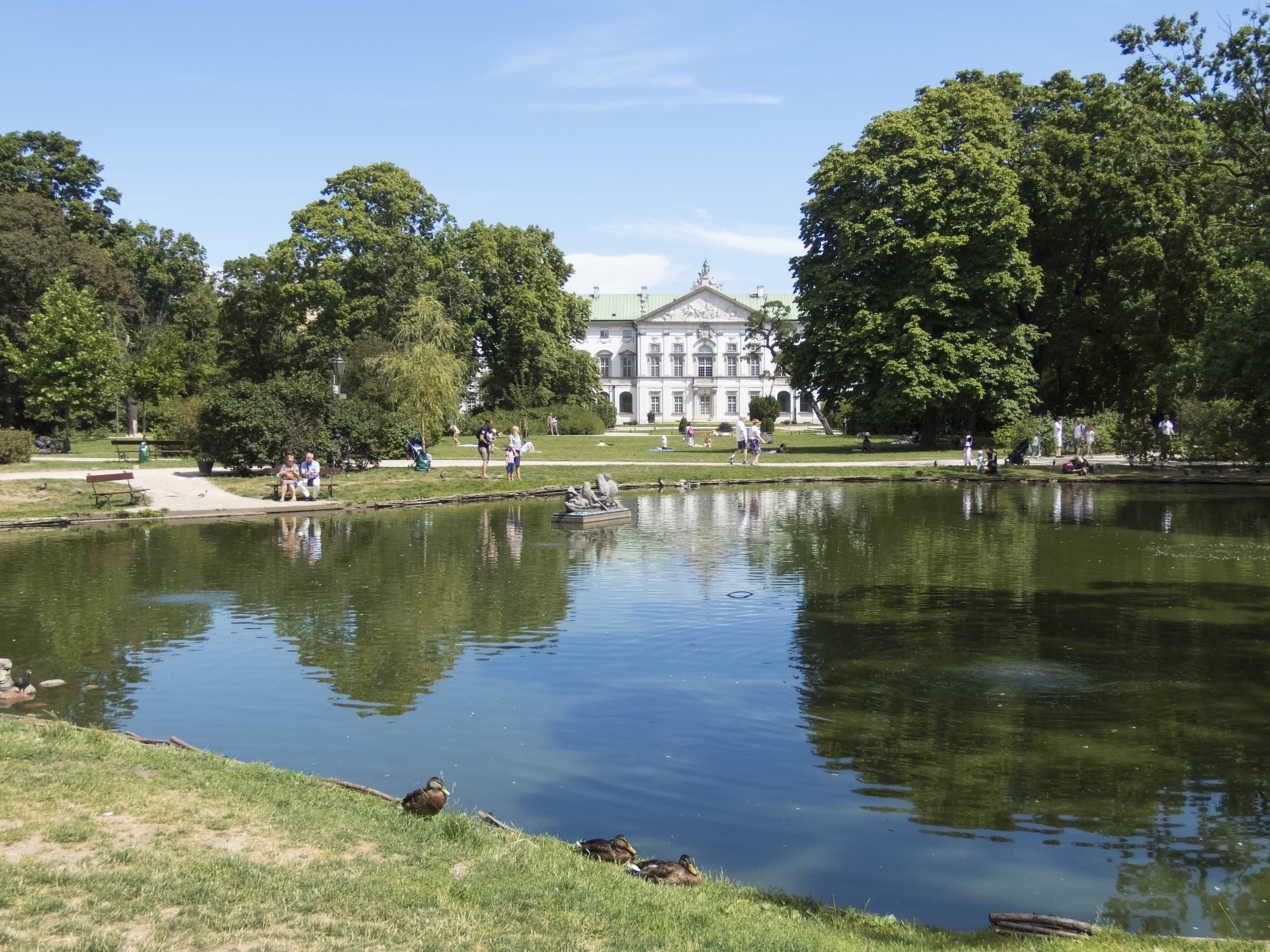
- Krasiński Garden Pond in 2020.

- Location within Poland
- Location: Krasiński Garden, Warsaw, Poland
- Coordinates: 52°14′53″N 21°00′05″E
- Lake type: Artificial lake
- Primary inflows: Water pipeline system
- Primary outflows: Sewage system
- Basin countries: Poland
- Surface area: 0.1443 hectares (0.357 acres)
- Surface elevation: 106.5 metres (349 ft)

Krasiński Garden Pond (Polish pronunciation: [kraˈɕiɲ.ski]; Polish: Staw w Ogrodzie Krasińskich) is a small artificial lake in Warsaw, Poland, within the neighbourhood of Muranów in the Downtown district. It is located in the Krasiński Garden, and has an area of 0.1443 ha. The lake was formed between 1891 and 1895.

== History ==
The artificial lake was developed sometime between 1891 and 1895, during the renovation of the Krasiński Garden, aimed at redeveloping it into an English landscape garden. It was designed by the author of the park project and the main city gardener, Franciszek Szanior. It was renovated between 2013 and 2014.

== Characteristics ==
The artificial lake is located in the centre of the Krasiński Garden in Warsaw, within the neighbourhood of Muranów in the Downtown district.

It is placed in the elevated area with the height of 106.5 m, and has a total area of 0.1443 ha. The water that feeds the lake is brought via pipelines to a small source on a hill, surrounded by decorative rocks, from where it flows via small creek and cascade waterfalls to the lake. The outflows is carried out via sewerage system. It features one island.

As the garden was designed to be a metaphor for Poland and its national symbols, the lake is a reflection of the Baltic Sea, with the attached creek symbolising Vistula river, and its source surrounded by rocks, mountains in the south of the country.

In the lake is placed a sculpture by Leon Machowski, which depicts five fisherman on a boat that carries a large fish.

== Gallery ==
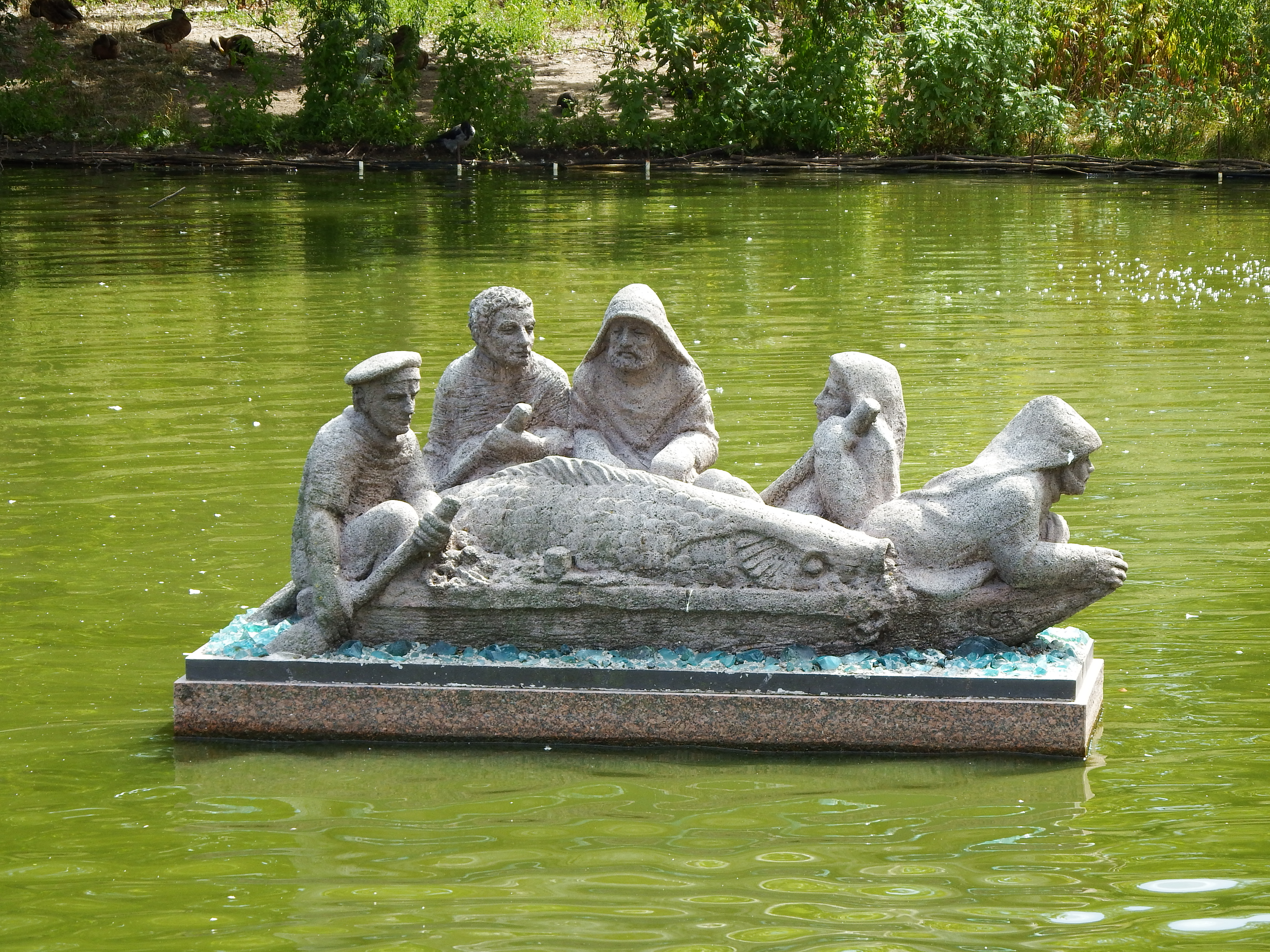
The sculpture of the fishermen by Leon Machowski.

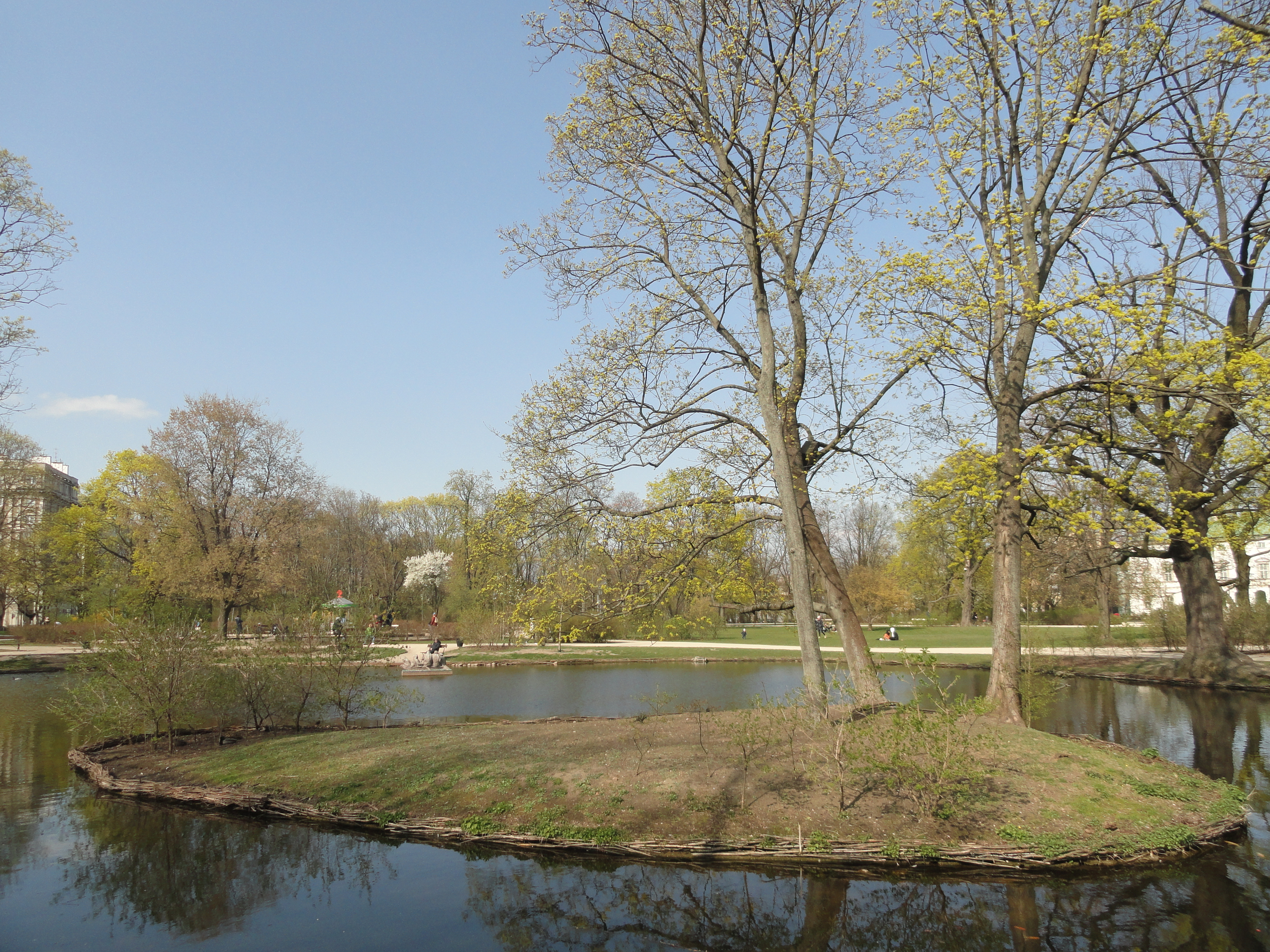
The island on the lake.

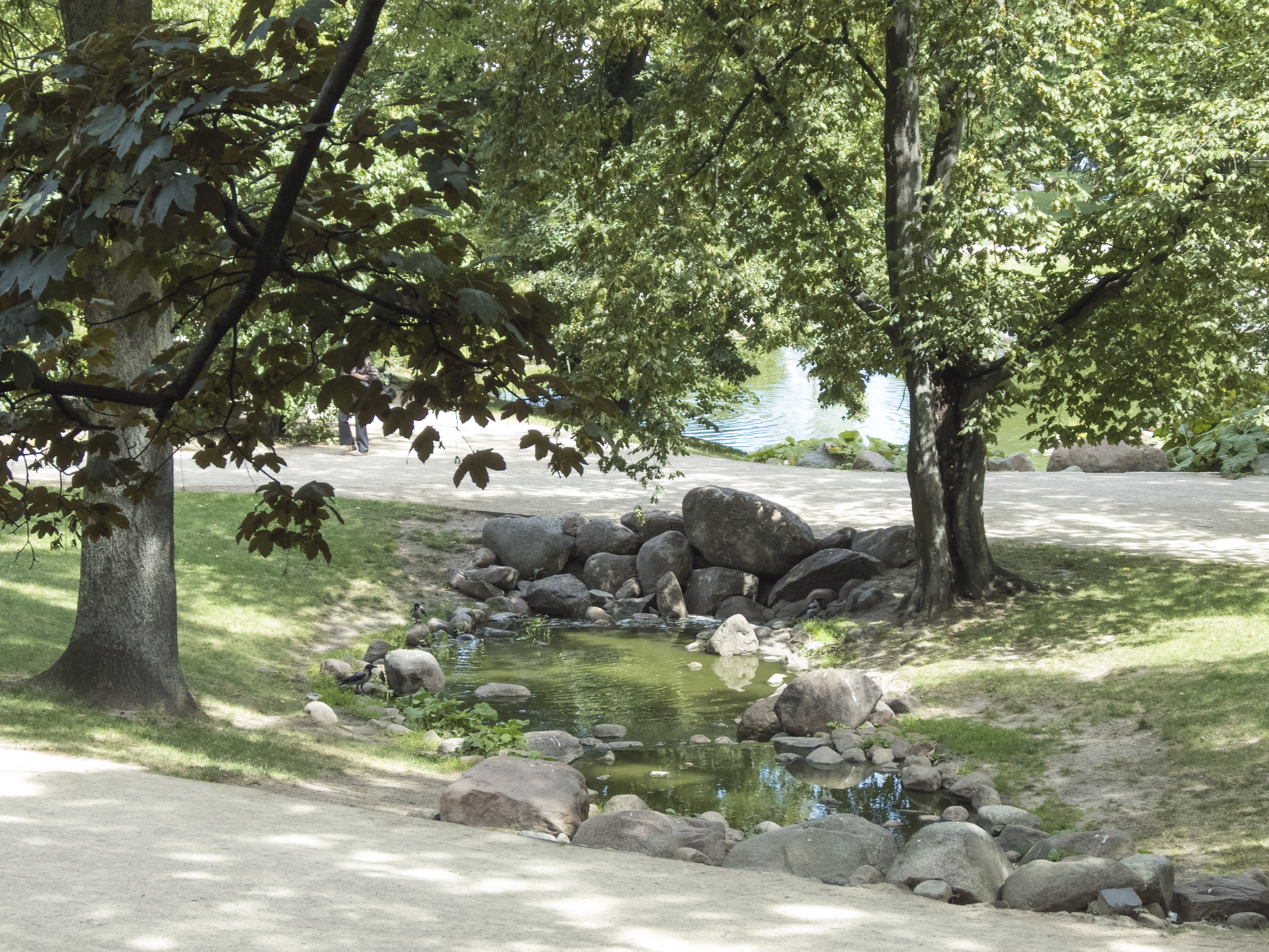
The creek and water source near the lake.
