= Krasiński Garden =

Urban park in Warsaw, Poland

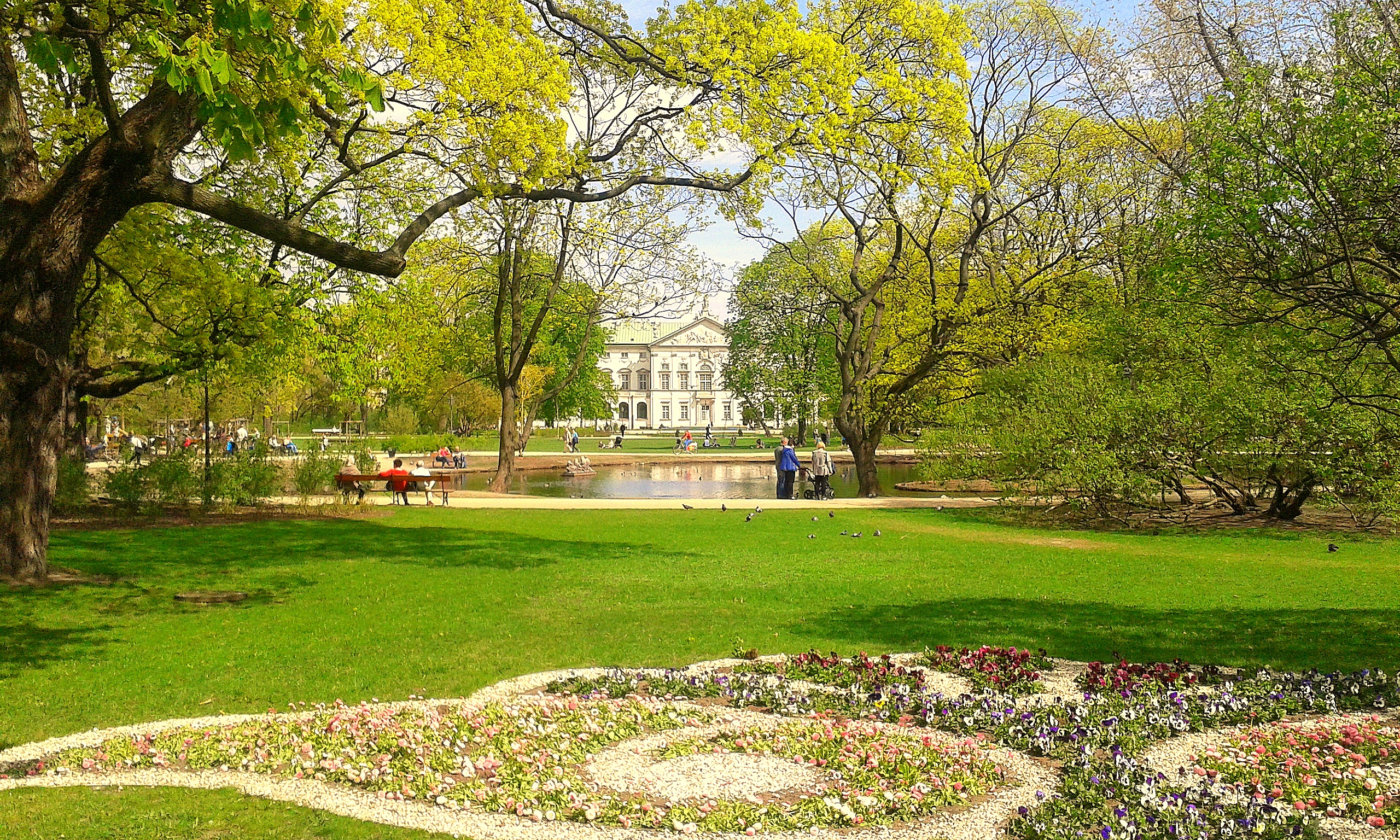
- The Krasiński Garden in 2016.
- Interactive map of Krasiński Garden
- Type: Urban park
- Location: Downtown, Warsaw, Poland
- Coordinates: 52°14′52″N 21°00′07″E
- Area: 11.8 ha (29 acres)
- Created: 1676 (as palace gardens); 1 April 1768 (as public park)
- Designer: Franciszek Szanior (1890s redesign)

The Krasiński Garden (Polish pronunciation: [kraˈɕiɲ.ski]; Polish: Ogród Krasińskich) is an urban park in Warsaw, Poland, within the neighbourhood of Muranów in the Downtown district. It is located between Świętojerska, Andersa, Stare Nalewki, and Długa Street, and borders Krasiński Square to the east.

The park was designed in Baroque style and developed in 1676 as a garden complex of the Krasiński Palace. With an original area of 3.4 ha, it was the largest park in Warsaw until the opening of the Saxon Garden in 1724. In 1765, it was bought by the state and turned into a public park that opened in 1768. It was heavily redesigned between 1891 and 1895 by the main city gardener, Franciszek Szanior, and redeveloped in the style of an English landscape garden. After the end of the Second World War, it was enlarged to its current area of 11.8 ha. It was renovated between 2012 and 2014.

== History ==
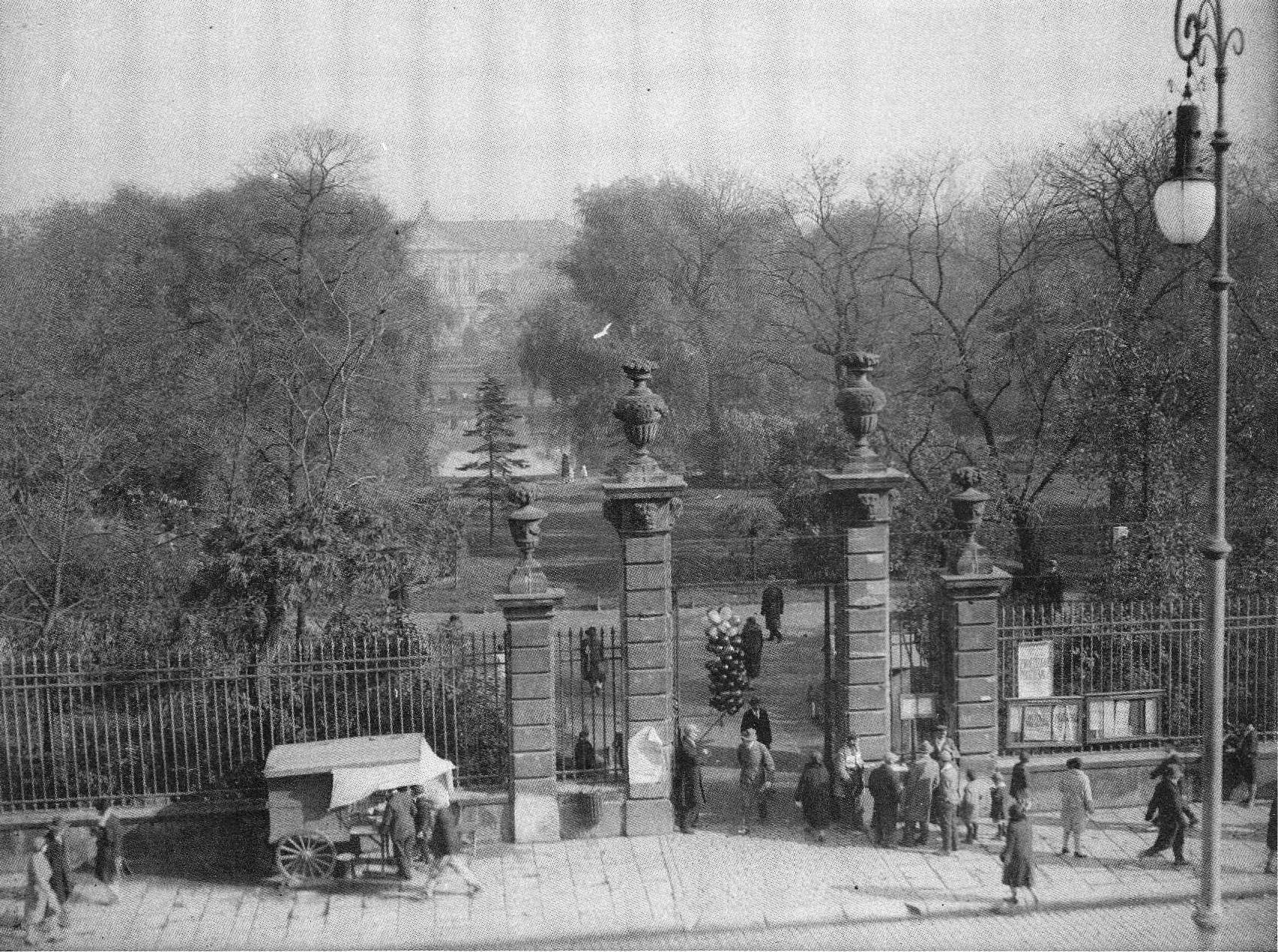
The park gate at Stare Nalewski Street in the 1920s.

The Krasiński Garden was founded in 1676, as the garden complex of the Krasiński Palace, which was constructed between 1677 and 1695, as a residence of Jan Dobrogost Krasiński, the voivode of the Płock Voivodeship. The garden was designed in the Baroque style, and with the area of 3.4 ha, it was the largest park in Warsaw, until the opening of the Saxon Garden in 1724.

The palace and its gardens were bought in 1765 by the state, and turned into a park opened to the public on 1 April 1768. It was heavily redesigned between 1891 and 1895 by the main city gardener, Franciszek Szanior, and redeveloped in the style of an English landscape garden. There was also created an artificial lake, known as the Krasiński Garden Pond.

In the evening of 29 November 1830, during the November Uprising, the insurgents fought and won in a skirmish at the western edge of the park, which subsequently allowed them to capture the Royal Arsenal and weaponry that was stored there. Currently, the event is commemorated with a plaque on a rock, placed in the park near Andersa Street.

In 1940, during the Second World War, while the city remained under the German occupation, outside the park, alongside current Świętojerska and Stare Nalewski Streets, were erected the walls of the Warsaw Ghetto. In 1944, during the Warsaw Uprising the park and surrounding area became a sight of fighting between Polish insurgents and German forces. This included the Chrobry I Battalion of the Home Army, which set up there a redoubt blocking the access to the Old Town. It was placed in the ruins of Simons Passage store complex. It was bombed on 31 August 1944, by the German Air Force. In the event died over 200 people, 120 of whom, were soldiers of the Polish resistance. After the war, the park was enlarged to 11.8 ha, incorporating the land, which was previously occupied by the formerly-neighbouring it buildings, that were destroyed in the war.

In the 1930s, prior to the war, under the park was constructed the bunker for the city mayor, then Stefan Starzyński. While he never used it, it became a shelter for the population of the nearby tenements during the conflict. After the war, it was used by the government as the archives. It survives to the present day. It has eight rooms with the height of 2.5, and enforced walls which are 1.3 m thick.

On 12 November 1963, at the garden square next to the park, near Andersa Street, was unveiled the monument dedicated to the soldiers of the First Polish Army that fought in the Second World War. It was designed by Xawery Dunikowski.

In 1965, the garden and the palace complex was given the statues of a protected cultural property.

On 31 August 1989, in the park, near Stare Nalewski Street, was unveiled a monument dedicated to the soldiers of the Chrobry I Battalion, designed by Jerzy Pietras. It was placed in the location of the former Simons Passage building. On 30 May 1999, in the garden square right outside the park's western gate at Stare Nalewski Street, was unveiled the monument dedicated to the Allies soldiers that fought in the Battle of Monte Cassino in 1944 during the Second World War. It was designed by Gustaw Zemła and Wojciech Zabłocki.

At the turn of the 20th century, the trees and plants of the park were allowed to spread naturally across the park, altering its original landscape concept, while enriching its biodiversity.

The park underwent major renovation works between 2012 and 2014, with the goal of restoring it to its 19th-century design. There was erected a fence around the park, and the historic entrance gate at Stare Nalewki Street was renovated. 337 trees, one third of parks supply, were cut down. According to the renovators, half of them were removed due to their health. It caused controversies among local inhabitants as well as ecological scientists, who argued that it would negativity impact the biodiversity in the park, as well as local animals. There was also staged a protest, supported by local celebrities, such as actor Olgierd Łukaszewicz. In 2014, 97 new trees and over 10,500 bushes were planted there.

Between 2013 and 2014, in the northern portion of the park was conducted archeological excavation, attempting to find the archives of the General Jewish Labour Bund. For this, there were excavated the cellars of former tenements at 38 and 40 Świętojerska Street. While the archives were not found, there were discovered human bones, everyday objects, and bucher tools. The fundings provided valuable insights to the everyday lives of the city inhabitants during the conflict.

On 2 October 2021, at the Krasiński Square, next to the park entrance, was unveiled the monument dedicated to the women of the Warsaw Uprising. It was designed by Monika Osiecka.

== Characteristics ==
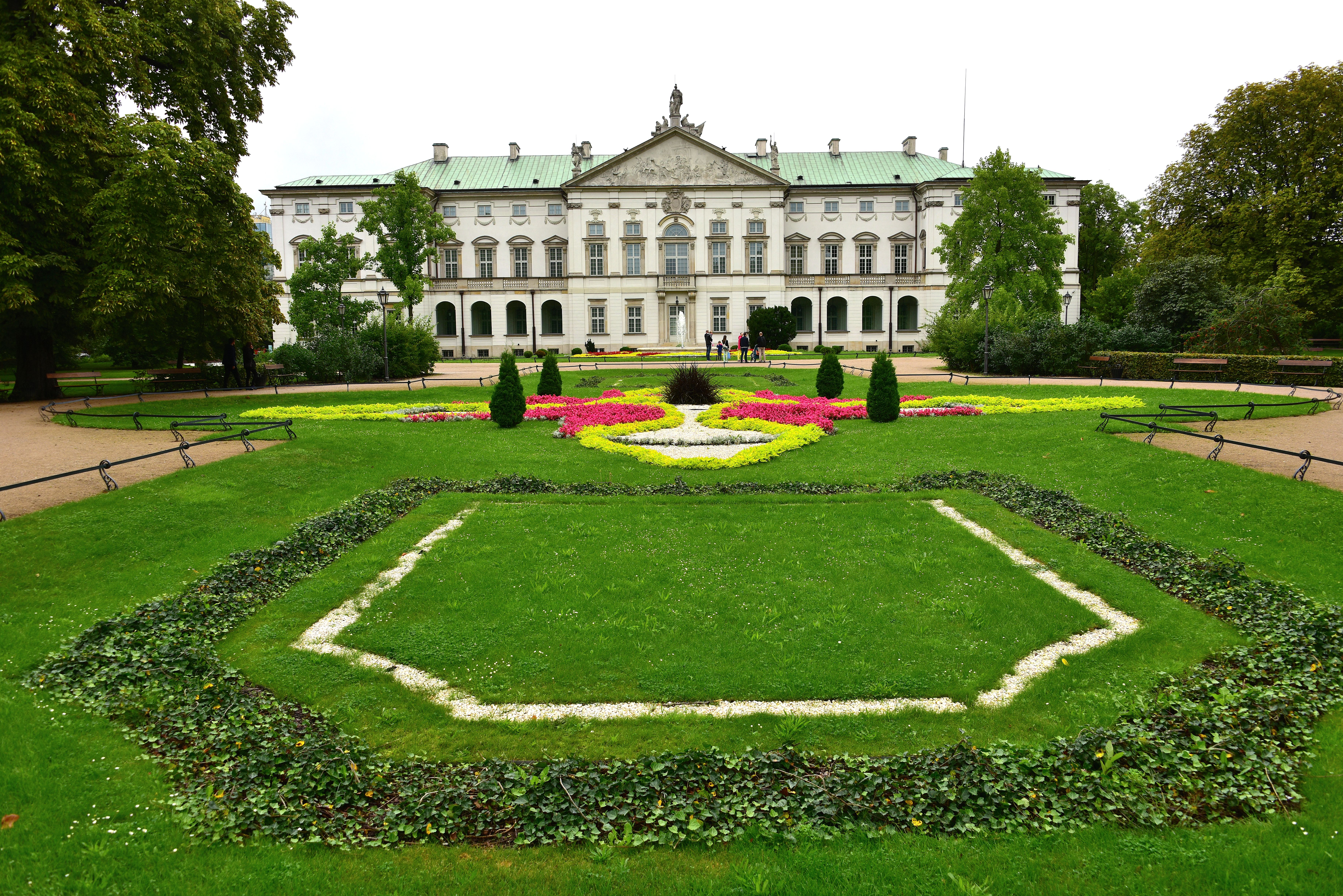
The Krasiński Palace in 2017, as seen from the park.

The park is located in the neighbourhood of Muranów, within the Downtown district. It is placed between Świętojerska, Andersa, Stare Nalewki, and Długa Street, and borders Krasiński Square to the east. It is surrounded by a fence, and has the total area of 11.8 ha.

Its western portion includes the Krasiński Palace, which dates to 1695, while in its western part, near Stare Nalewski Street is located a historic Baroque entrance gate. The entire park is surrounded by a fence. To the south of the park, alongside Długa Street are located buildings such as Maria Radziwiłłtwa Palace, Palace of the Four Winds, and the Royal Arsenal, which housed the National Museum of Archaeology. Near it, at Stare Nalewski Street is also the monument dedicated to the soldiers of the Chrobry I Battalion, that fought in the Warsaw Uprising. It was designed by Jerzy Pietras, and consists of a commemorative plaque, a metal cross and four large rocks stylised to resemble gravestones. It is located in the location of the former Simons Passage store complex, which was bombed on 31 August 1944, by the German Air Force. In the event died over 200 people, 120 of whom, were soldiers of the Polish resistance.

In the park centre is located an artificial lake, known as the Krasiński Garden Pond, which was formed in the 1890s. It has an area of 0.1443 ha. Within it is place a sculpture by Leon Machowski, which depicts five fisherman on a boat that carries a large fish.

Near the entrance to the park, at Krasiński Square, is placed the monument dedicated to the women who served and died during the Warsaw Uprising. It was designed by Monika Osiecka, and consists of statues of three women holding hands.

A section of the park, known as the Wandering Soldiers Square (Polish: Skwer Żołnierzy Tułaczy), placed between Andersa and Stare Nalewski Streets, is located outside the fence. In its centre is placed the monument dedicated to the Allies soldiers that fought in the Battle of Monte Cassino in 1944 during the Second World War. It was designed by Gustaw Zemła and Wojciech Zabłocki, and consists of a sculpture of Nike, a headless and winged goddess from Greek mythology, made from reinforced concrete and covered in white marble. Additionally, there are several other commemorative plaques. This includes:

- a plaque to Władysław Anders, a commander of the Polish Armed Forces in the West during the Second World War, and later in life a politician and prominent member of the Polish government-in-exile in London;
- a plaque thanking the government and people of the Kolhapur State in India (now part of Maharashtra, India) for accommodating refugees from Poland between 1943 and 1947, that were displaced during the Second World War;
- a plaque thanking Iran for accommodating Polish refugees from the Soviet Union in 1942
- a plaque commemorating the skirmish of 29 November 1830, fought during the November Uprising, between the insurgents and the Russian forces;
- and a bountry markers of the former wall of the Warsaw Ghetto, near the intersection of Andersa and Świętojerska Street.

On the other side of Andersa Street is also located the Stalinism Political Prisoners Square (Polish: Skwer Więźniów Politycznych Stalinizmu), a garden square located between Andersa, Anielewicza, Nowolipki, and Zamenhofa Streets. In its centre is placed the monument dedicated to the soldiers of the First Polish Army that fought in the Second World War. It was designed by Xawery Dunikowski, and consists of an 8-metre-tall granite statue depicting a soldier of the Polish Armed Forces in the East.

Krasiński Garden has the status of a protected cultural property.

Underneath the park is buried the bunker dating to the 1930s, which was used during the Second World War. It has eight rooms with the height of 2.5, and enforced walls which are 1.3 m thick.

== Gallery ==
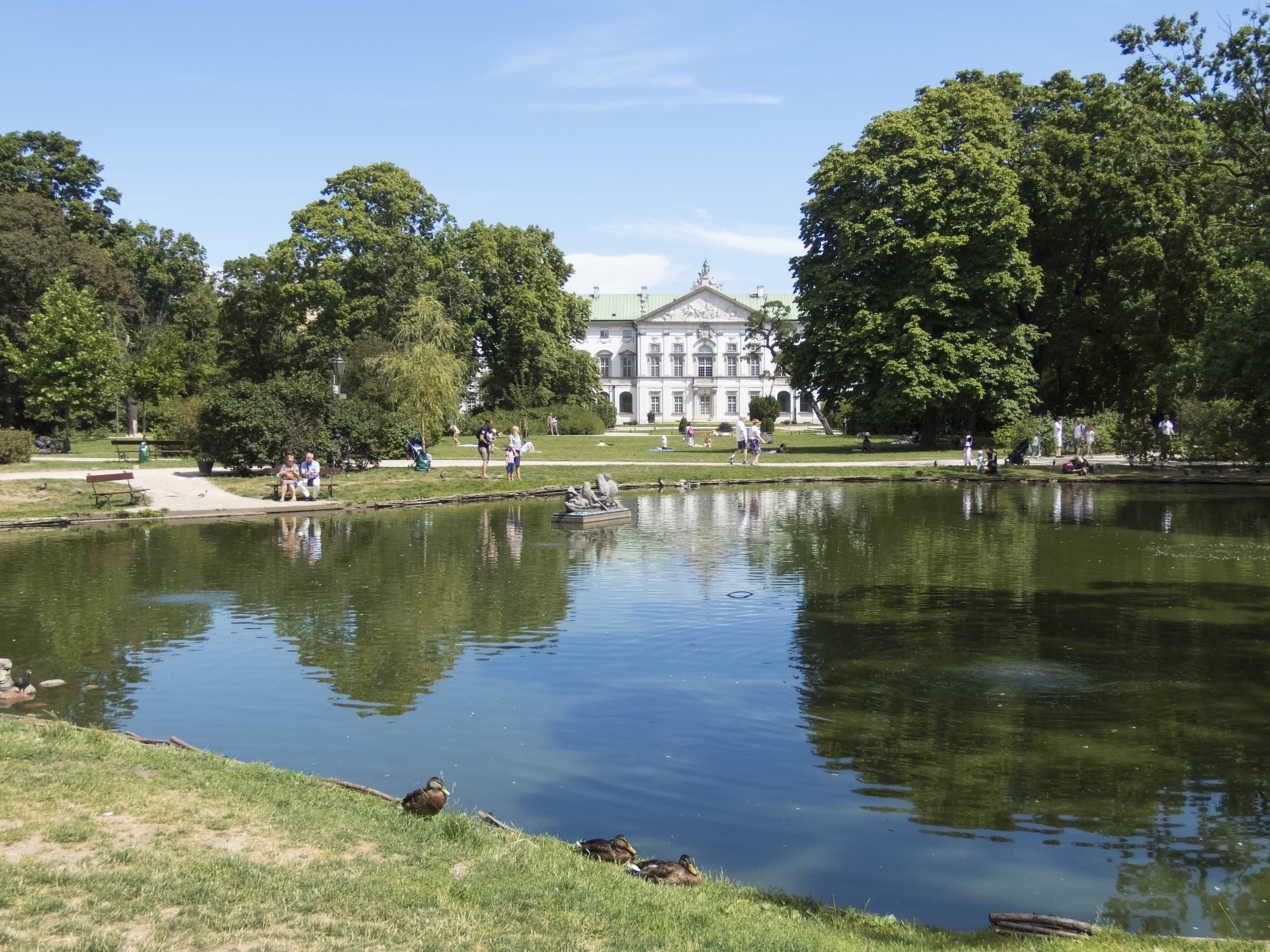
The Krasiński Garden Pond.

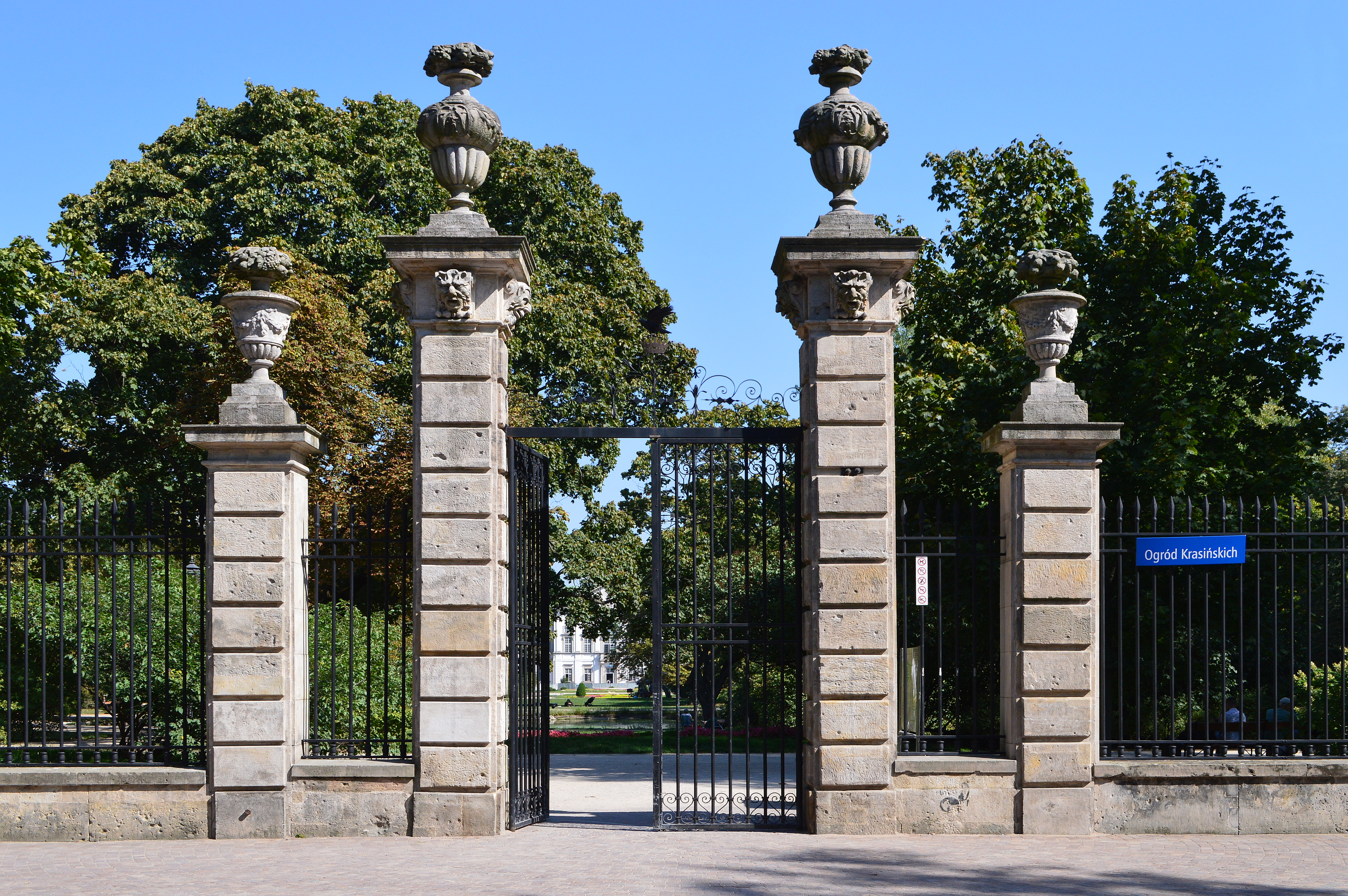
The entrance gate at Stare Nalewski Street.

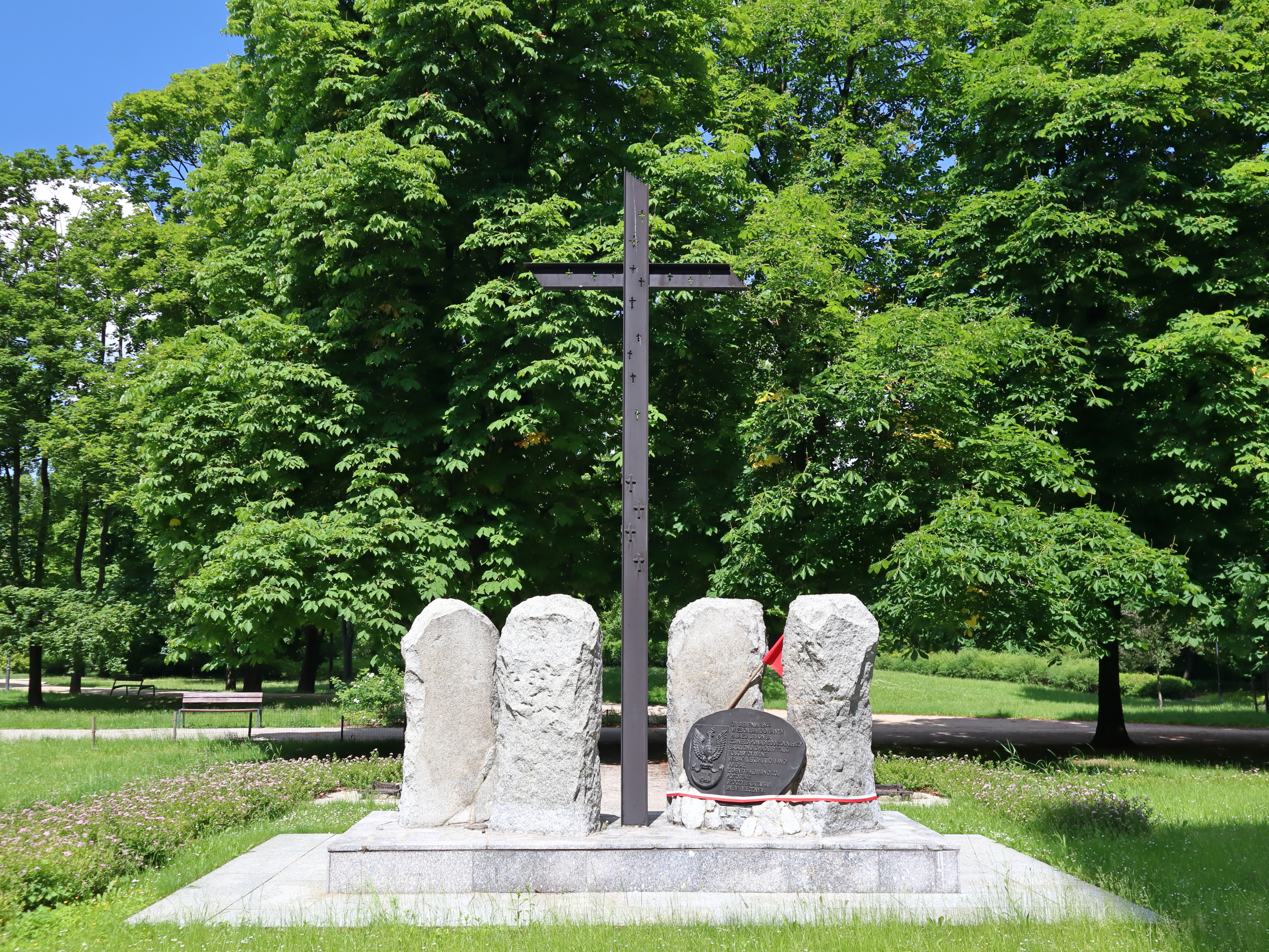
The monument to the Chrobry I Battalion.

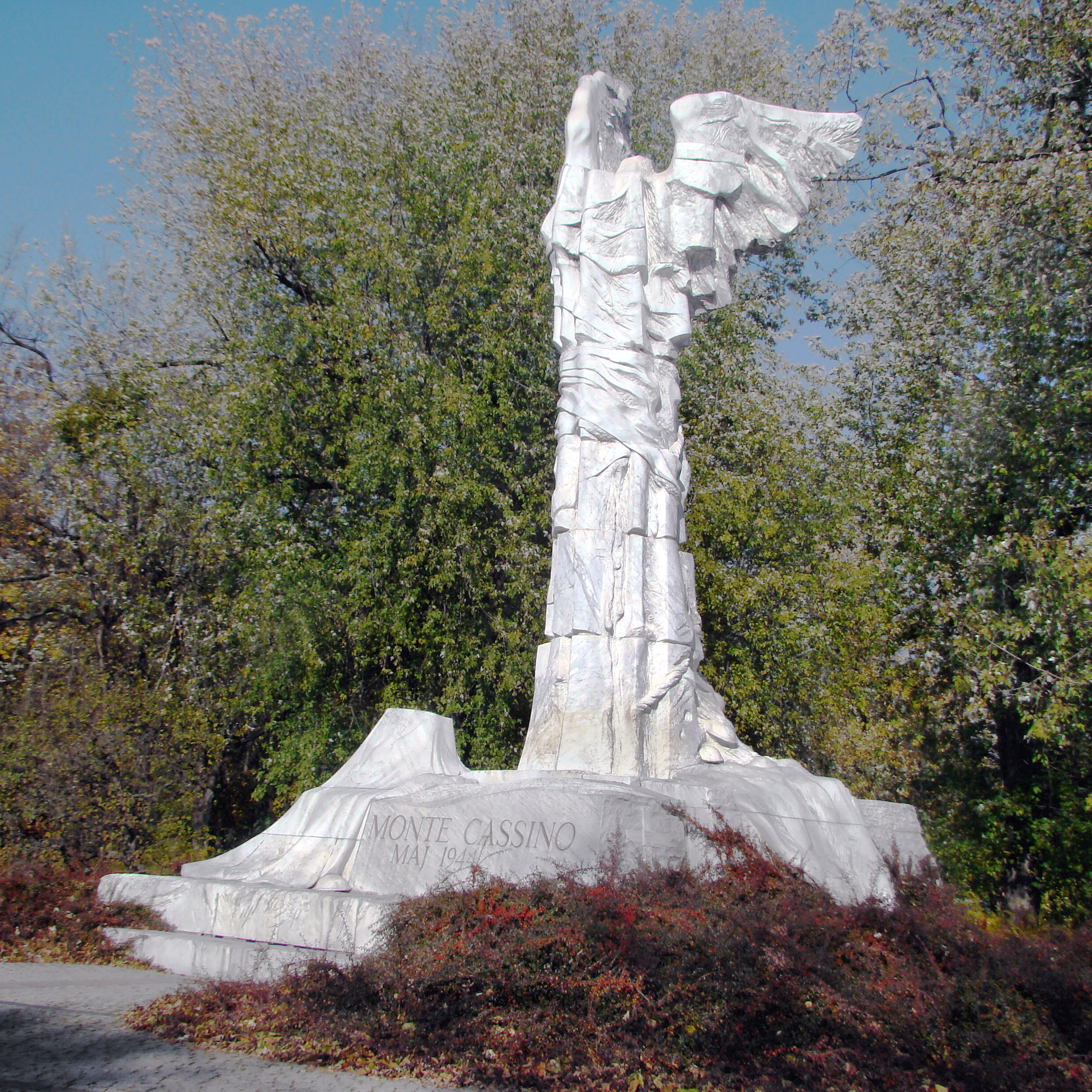
The Monument to the Battle of Monte Cassino.

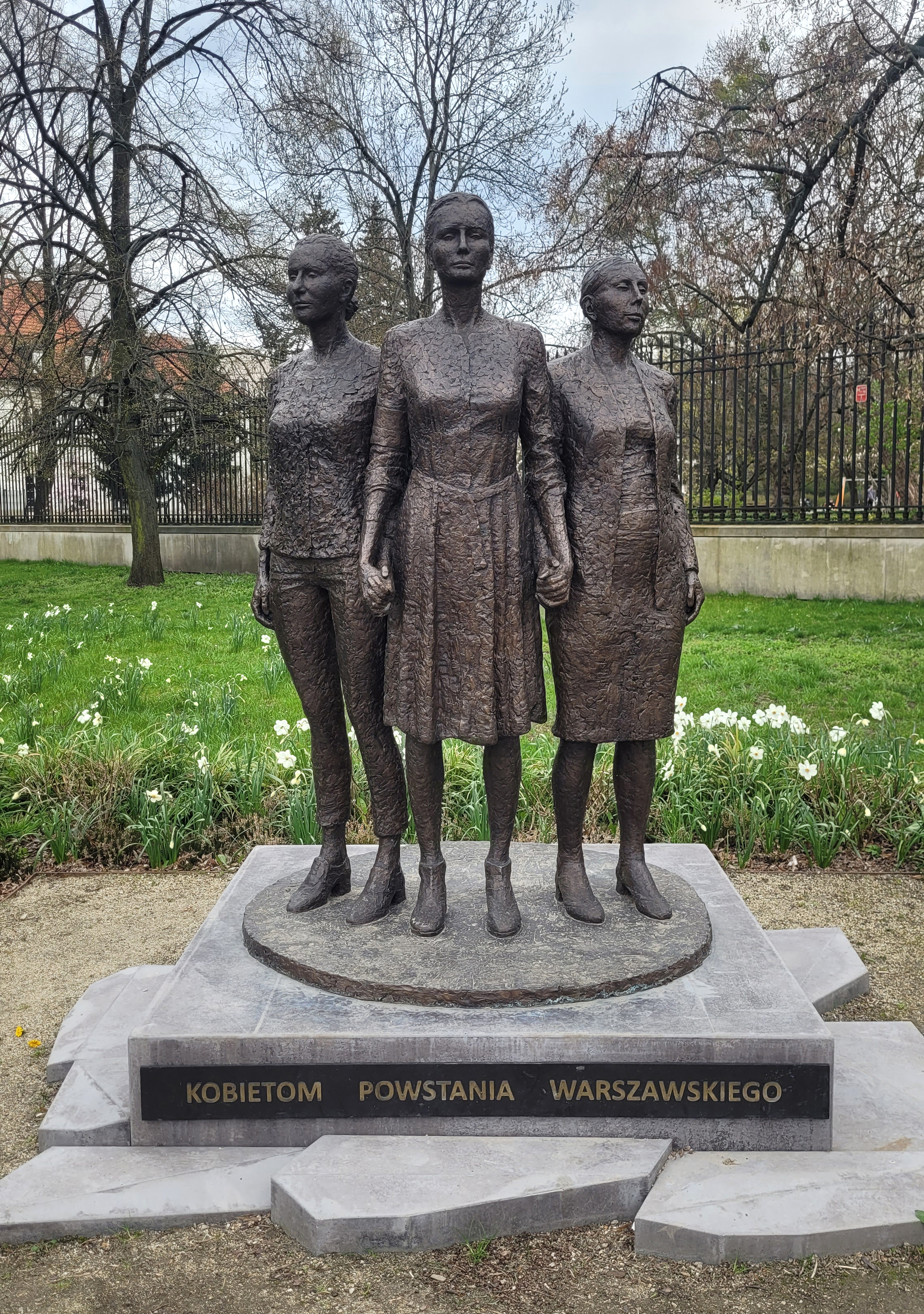
The Monument to the Women of the Warsaw Uprising.

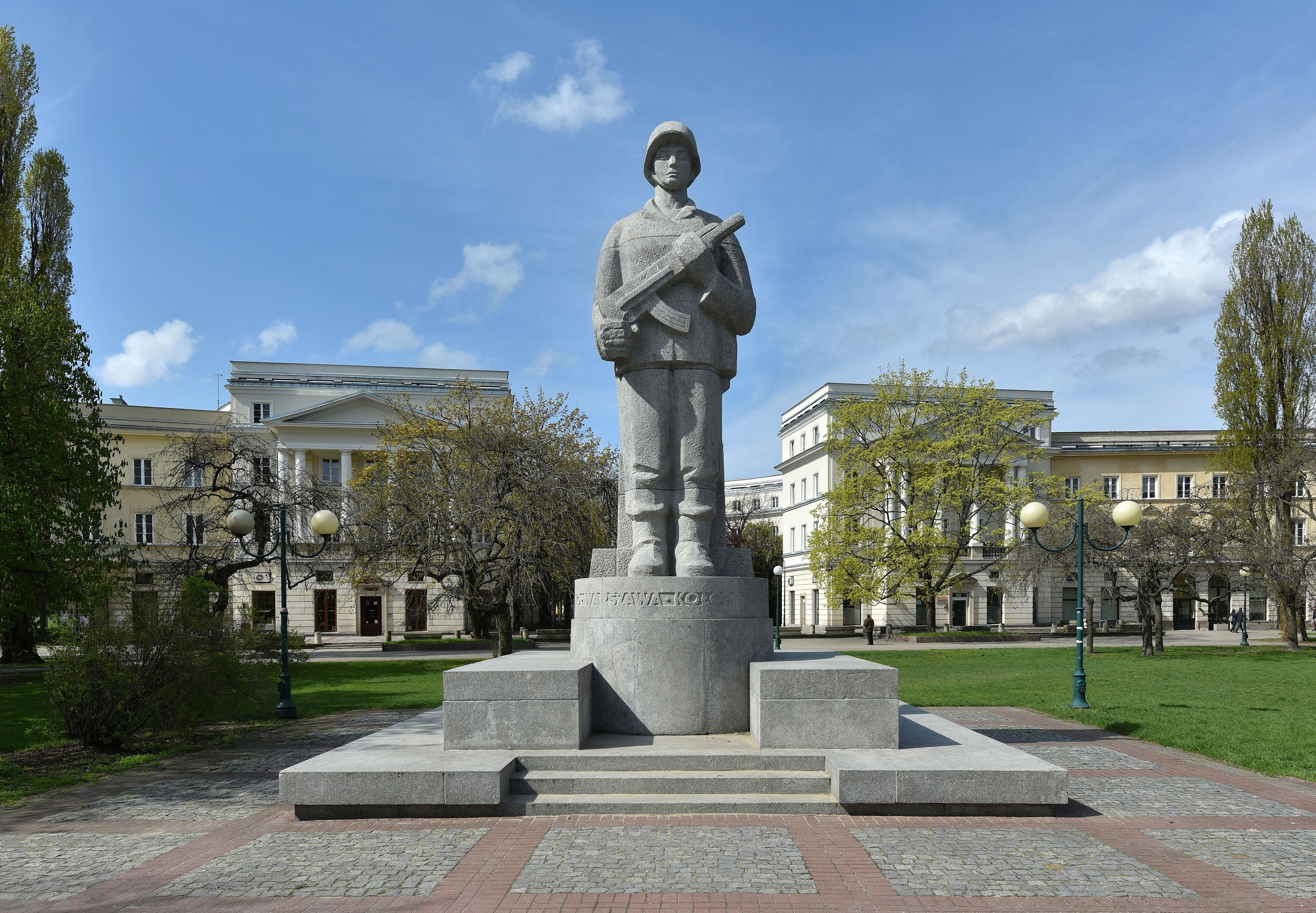
The Monument to the Soldiers of the First Polish Army.

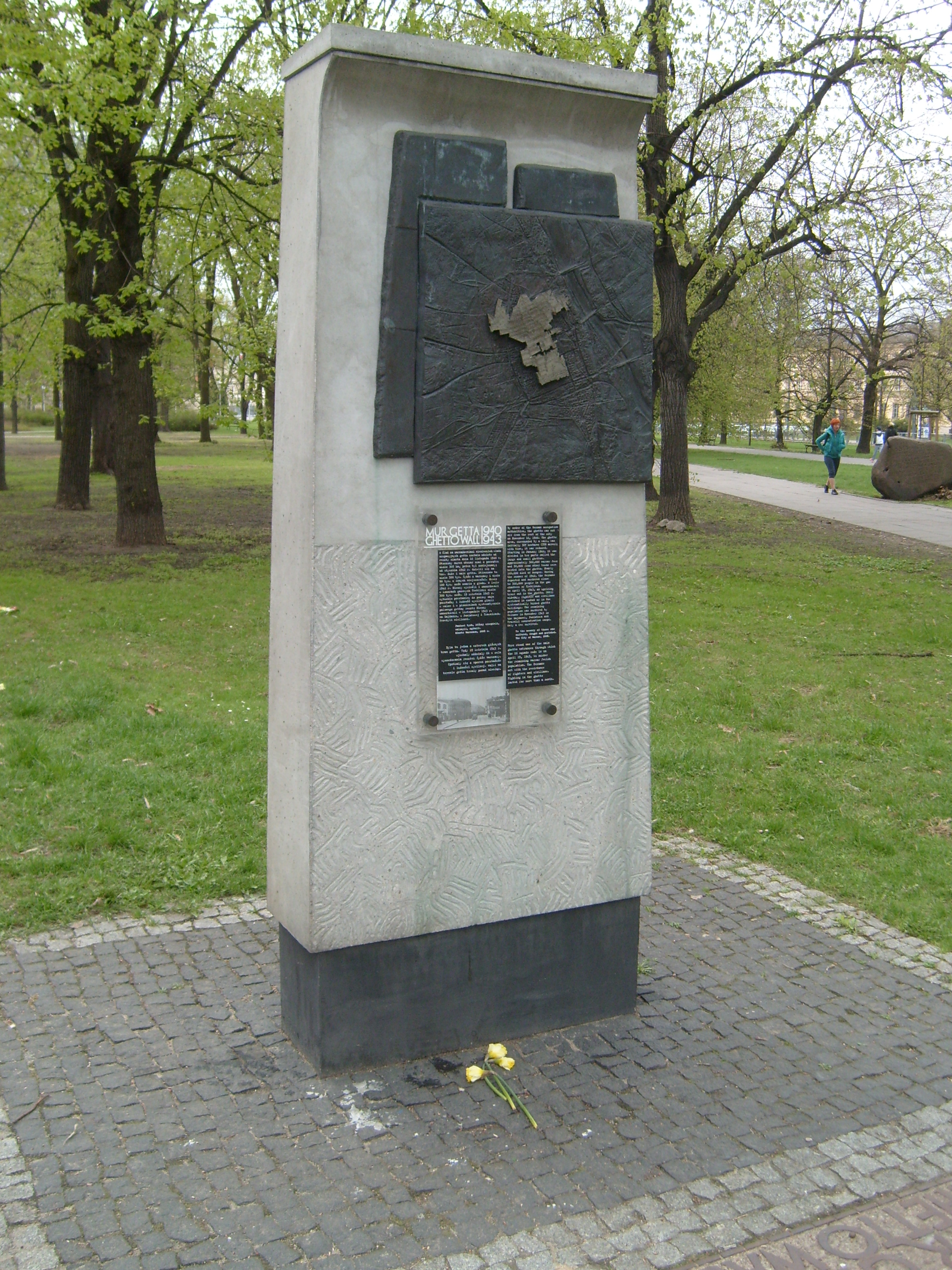
The Warsaw Ghetto boundary marker near the intersection of Andersa and Świętojerska Streets.

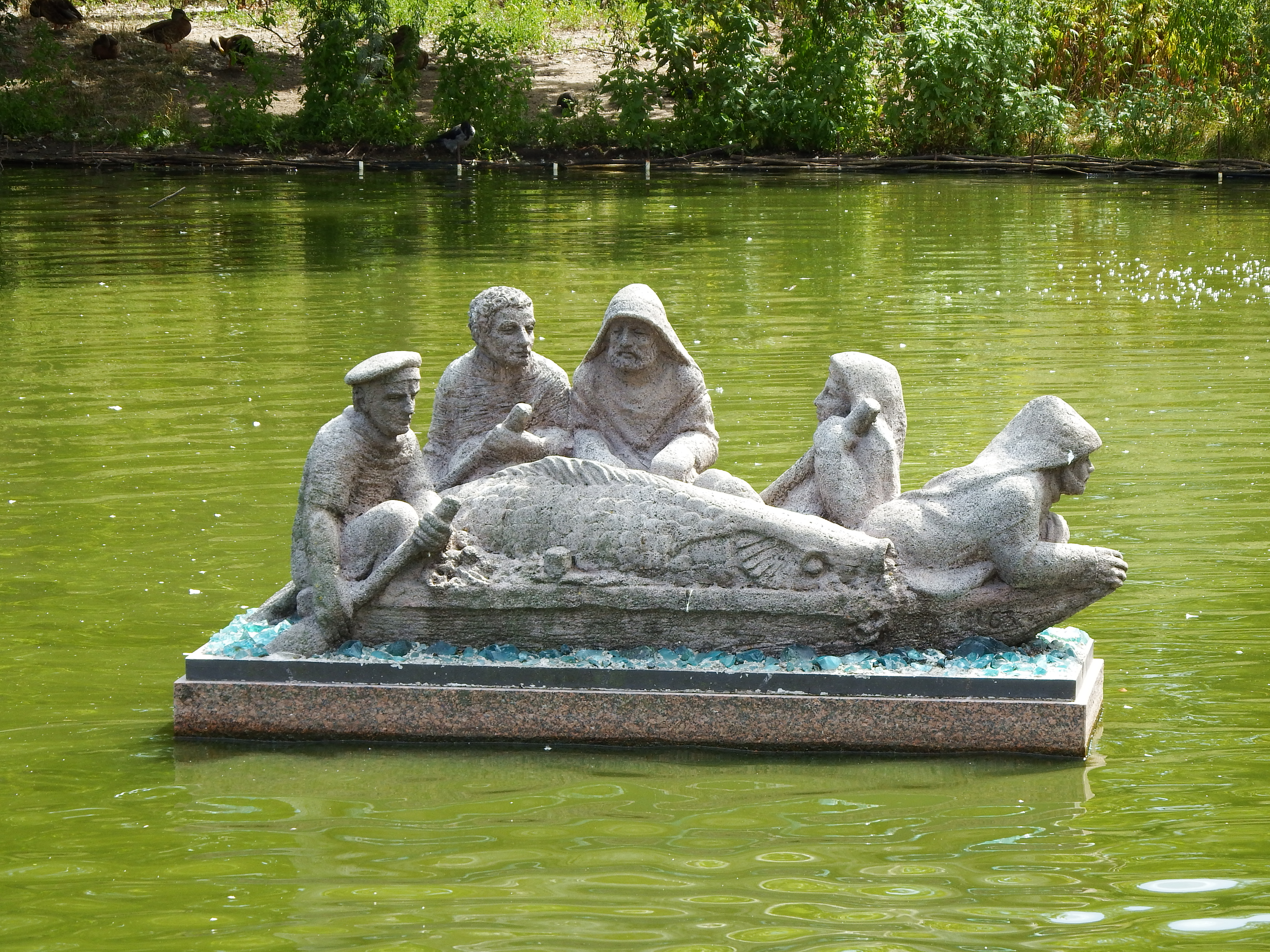
The sculpture of the fishermen by Leon Machowski, at the Krasiński Garden Pond.
