= Krasiński Square =

Square in Warsaw

Coordinates: 52°14′57″N 21°0′13″E

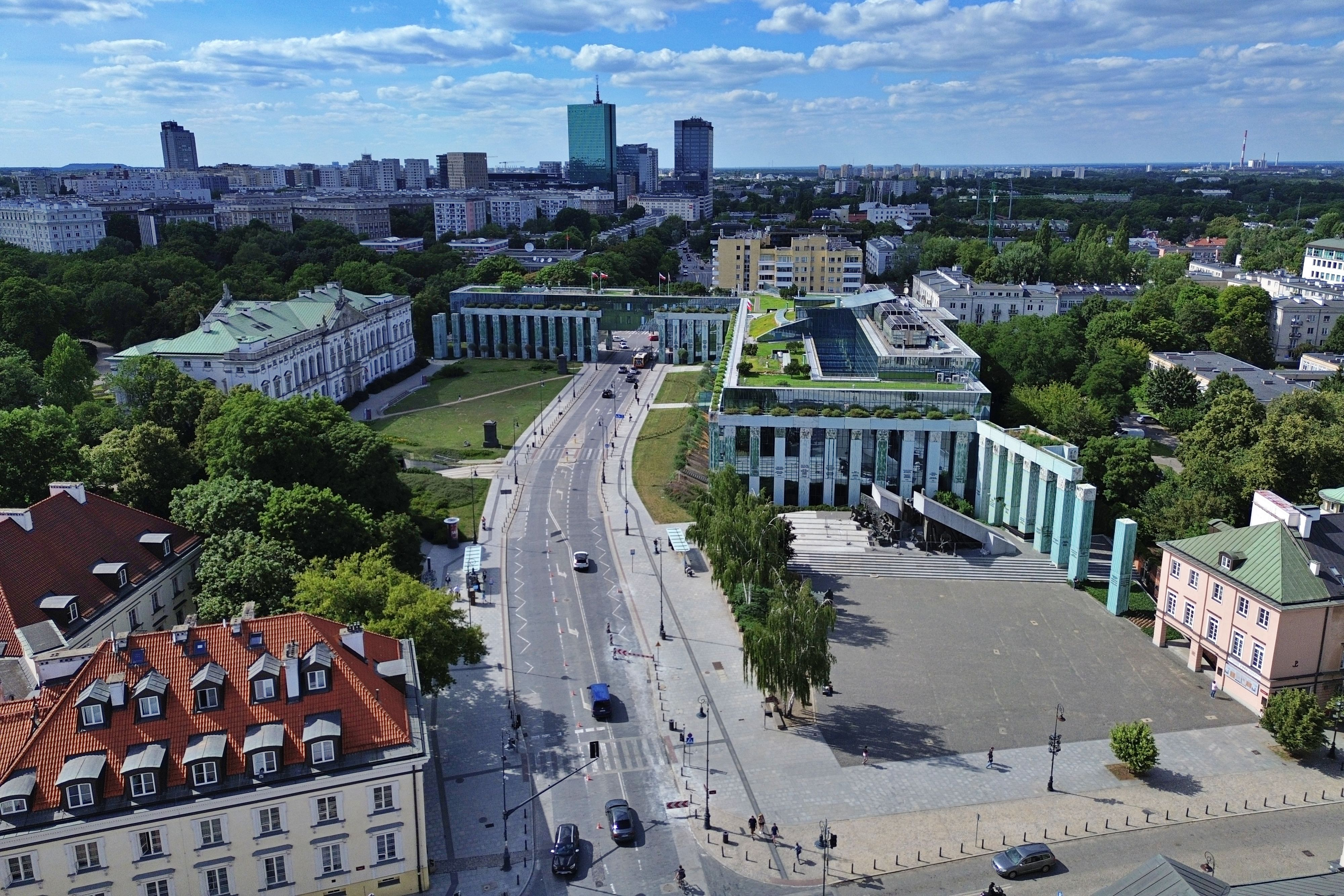
Krasiński Square — in the background on the left, the Krasiński Palace; on the right, the building of the Supreme Court (2024)

Krasiński Square (Polish: plac Krasińskich) is a square in the central district of Warsaw, Poland. The square itself is adjacent to Warsaw Old Town and features buildings of great historical and national significance.

The square is located between Długa Street and the outlet of Miodowa Street, and Świętojerska and Bonifraterska Streets. Its name commemorates the Krasiński family of the Ślepowron coat of arms, the owners of the Krasiński Palace.

== History ==
=== 1765–1939 ===
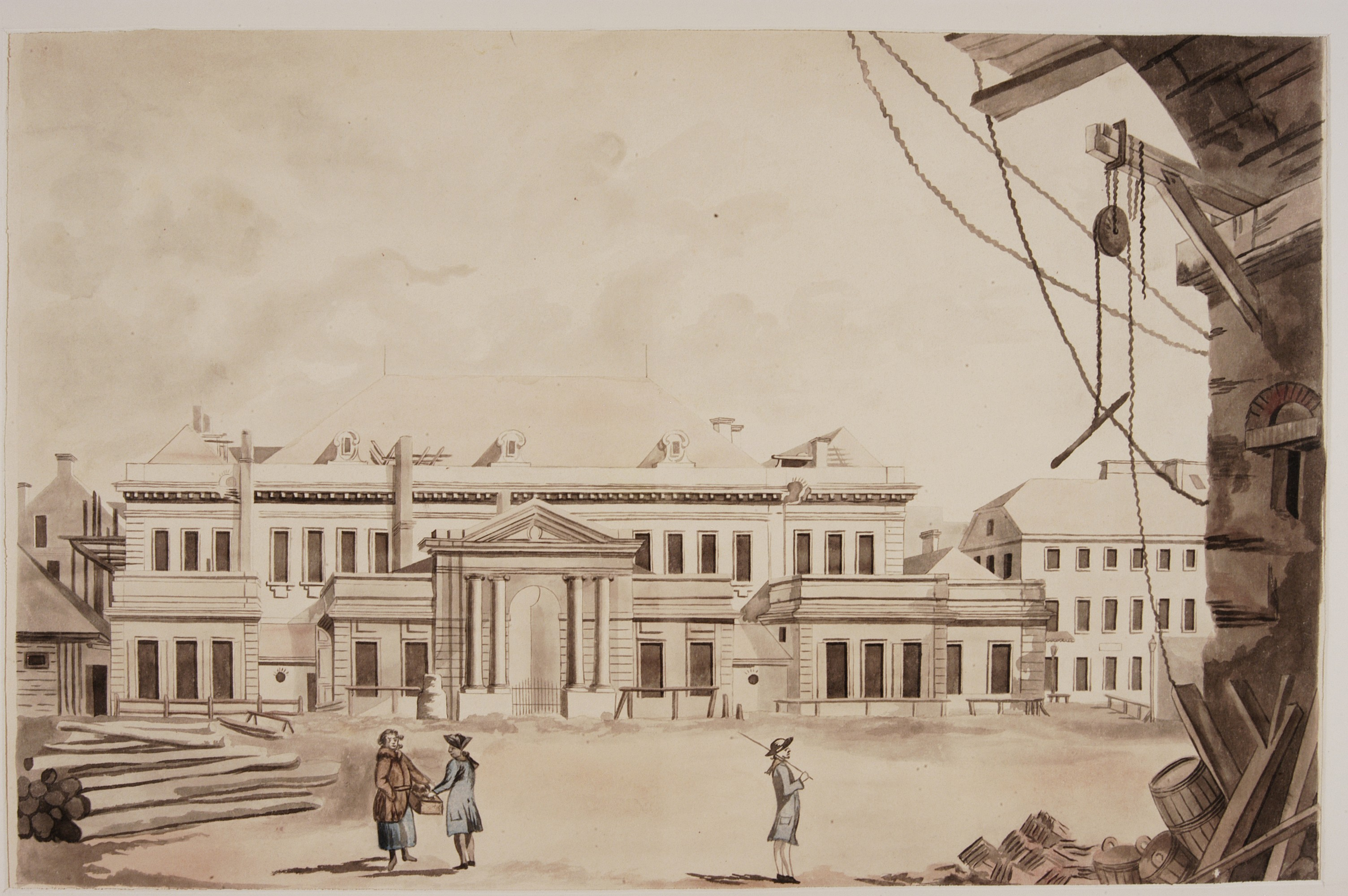
The National Theatre at Krasiński Square in a drawing by Zygmunt Vogel, ca. 1791

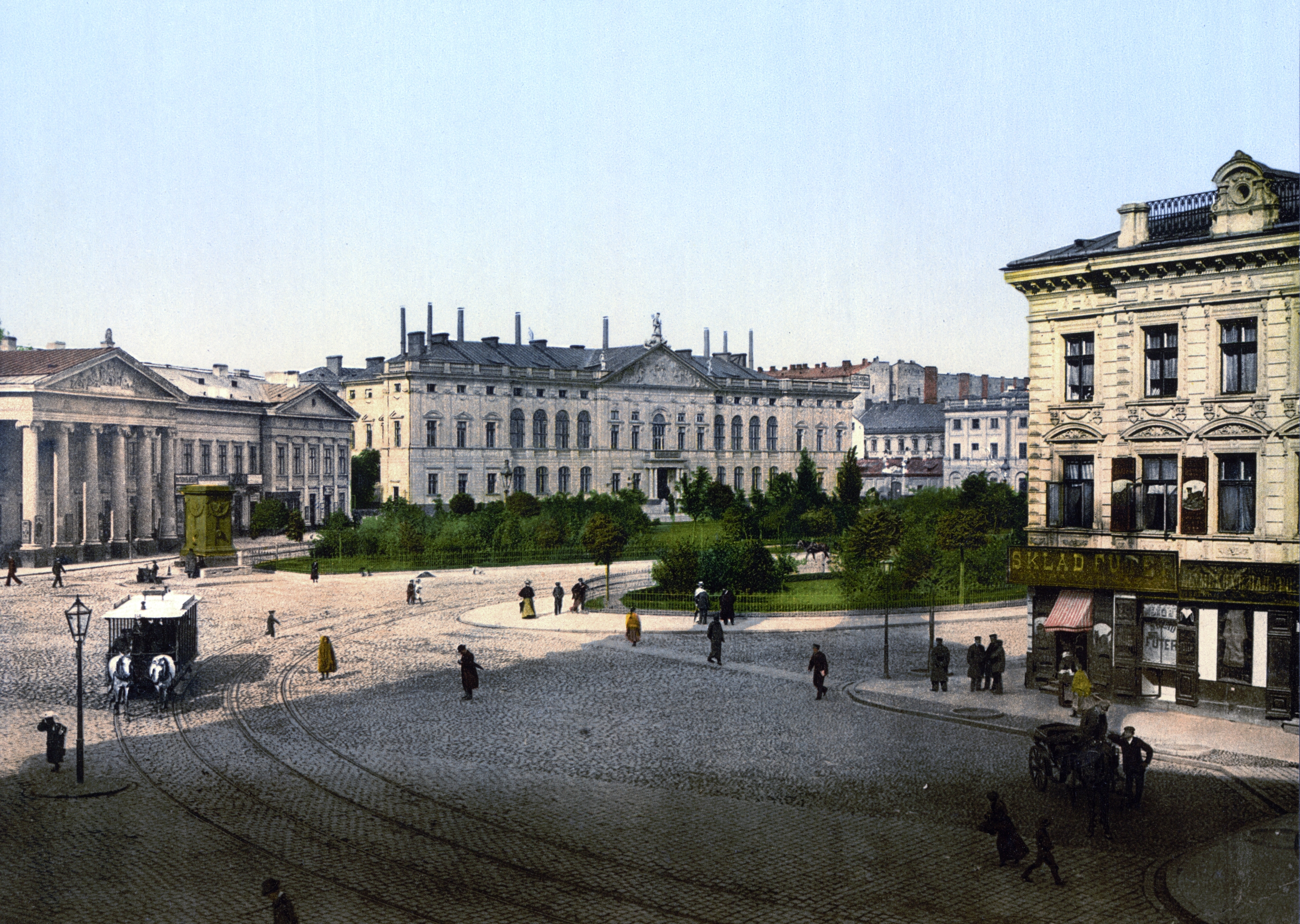
Krasiński Square in 1890–1905, on the left the non-existent Baden Palace

The square was created on the site of the courtyard of the Krasiński Palace, which was originally enclosed by walls. After the building was purchased by the Polish–Lithuanian Commonwealth in 1765, the courtyard became a public space.

In 1779, opposite the palace, the National Theatre was built, designed by Bonaventura Solari. When the theatre moved to its new building on Theatre Square in 1833, the old one was turned into warehouses, and the square began to host wool fairs. These fairs opened on June 15 and lasted five to six days.

In 1786, a Customs House was built in the southwest corner of the square (later housing the Central Archives of Historical Records), later obscured by the Badeni Palace, erected in 1837–1838.

By the end of the 18th century, the square was partly paved, and by the 19th century, it was fully cobbled with fieldstone.

In 1824, two cast-iron well casings designed by Chrystian Piotr Aigner and made by Tomasz Ewans and Józef Morris’s Warsaw foundry were installed on the square. They replaced earlier obelisk-shaped wells. Aigner gave them the form of ancient altars, decorated with goat-headed Pan reliefs, eagles, festoon motifs, and the date of construction (MDCCCXXIII).

The square was initially intended as the site of the Prince Józef Poniatowski monument, but during his visit to Warsaw in 1829, Tsar Nicholas I ordered the monument to be placed in the courtyard of the Governor’s Palace (now the Presidential Palace) instead.

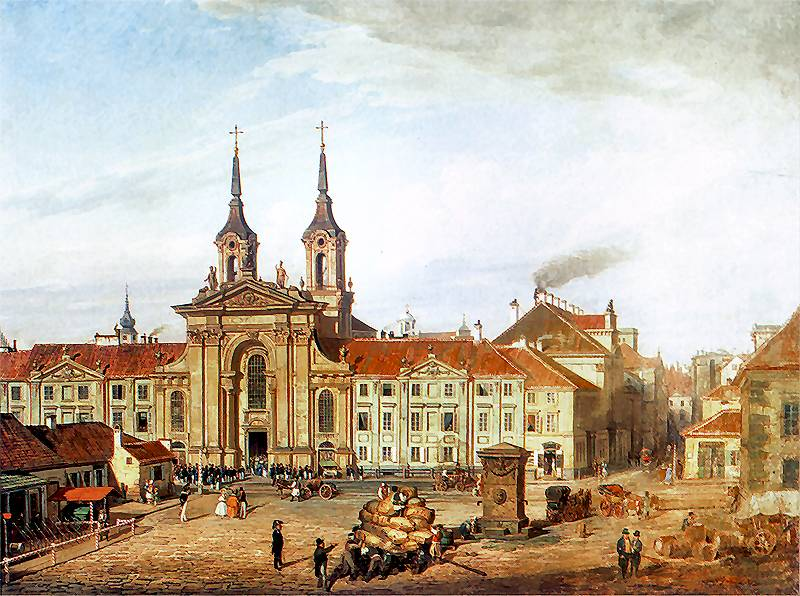
The Piarist Church in a painting by Marcin Zaleski

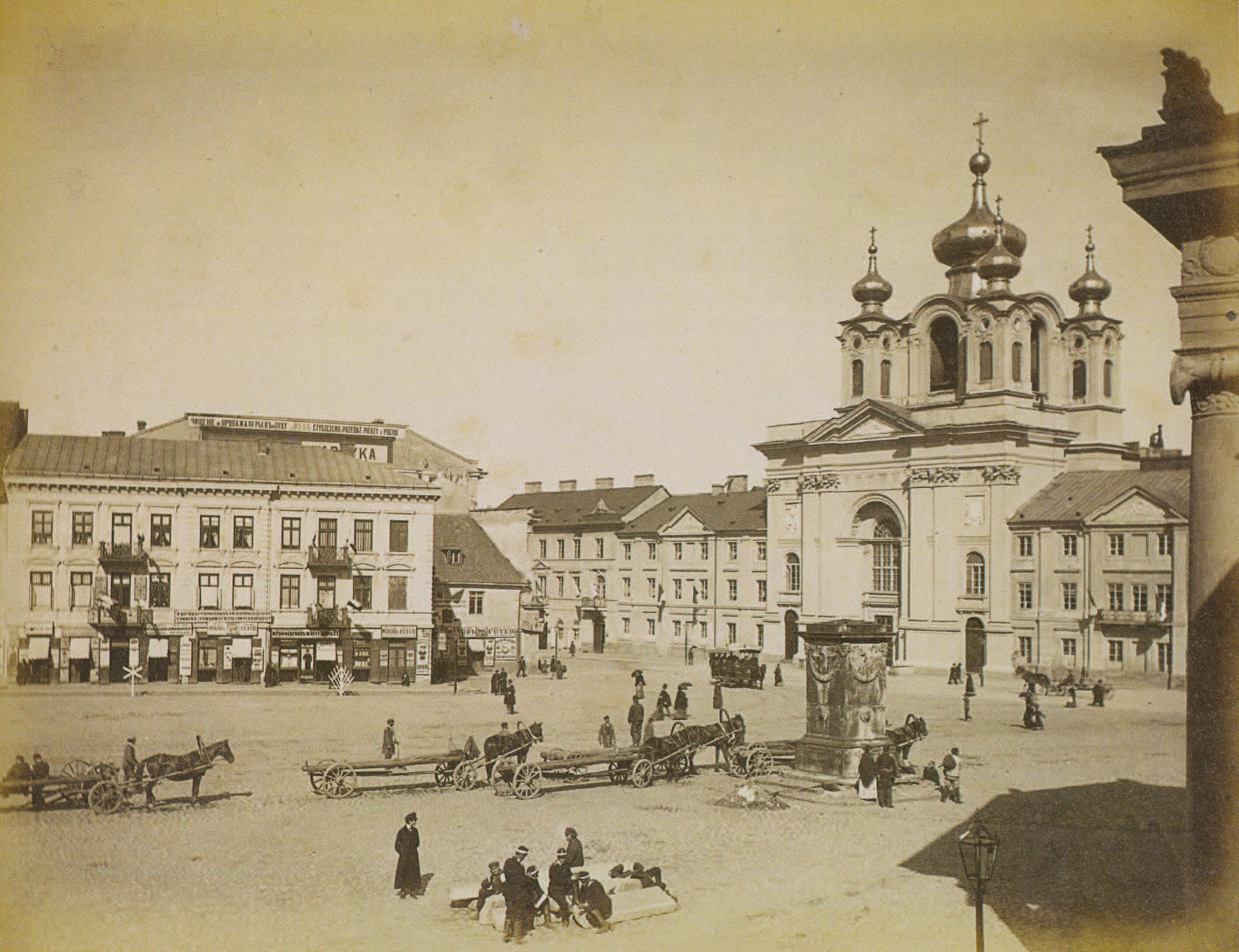
The temple was rebuilt into the Holy Trinity Cathedral, one of the wells by Christian Peter Aigner is visible, ca. 1885

After the establishment of the Orthodox Diocese of Warsaw in 1834, the former Piarist Church was converted into the Holy Trinity Cathedral (1835–1837), designed by Antonio Corazzi and Andrzej Gołoński. To better expose the new church, the square—then renamed Cathedral Square—was redesigned to give it a metropolitan character. Until 1915, military parades of the Warsaw garrison were held in front of the cathedral. The church’s baroque form was restored in 1923–1924 by Oskar Sosnowski.

After the January Uprising (1863), the Krasiński Palace’s north wing housed several courts: Civil, Commercial, Peace (Section II), and Criminal. Later, the District Court and the Warsaw Court of Appeal also operated there.

The square, initially lit by oil lamps, received gas lighting in 1856 and electric lighting around 1908.

In 1882, the wool market that had been held there since 1836 was closed, replaced by a horse-drawn tram terminus. The National Theatre building was demolished in 1884, and the lots were developed with tenement houses.

In 1908, the first electric trams crossed the square, following a route from Miodowa Street to Nowiniarska Street.

In December 1938, after demolishing several properties, the Krasiński Square became part of a new traffic route to Żoliborz. The north wing of the Krasiński Palace was rebuilt on a large arched passage, designed by Marian Lalewicz. The old tram tracks on Nowiniarska Street were retained.

During the interwar period, the square and its immediate surroundings formed the center of the judiciary. The following institutions were located there: the Supreme Court (in the Krasiński Palace), the Court of Appeal (in the Badeni Palace), the departments of the District Court (in the outbuildings of the Krasiński Palace) along with its main seat in the nearby Pac Palace, and at 7 Długa Street (the Raczyński Palace) – the Ministry of Justice.

From 1936–1942 and again from 1946–1959, the Jan Kiliński monument stood on the square.

=== Second World War ===
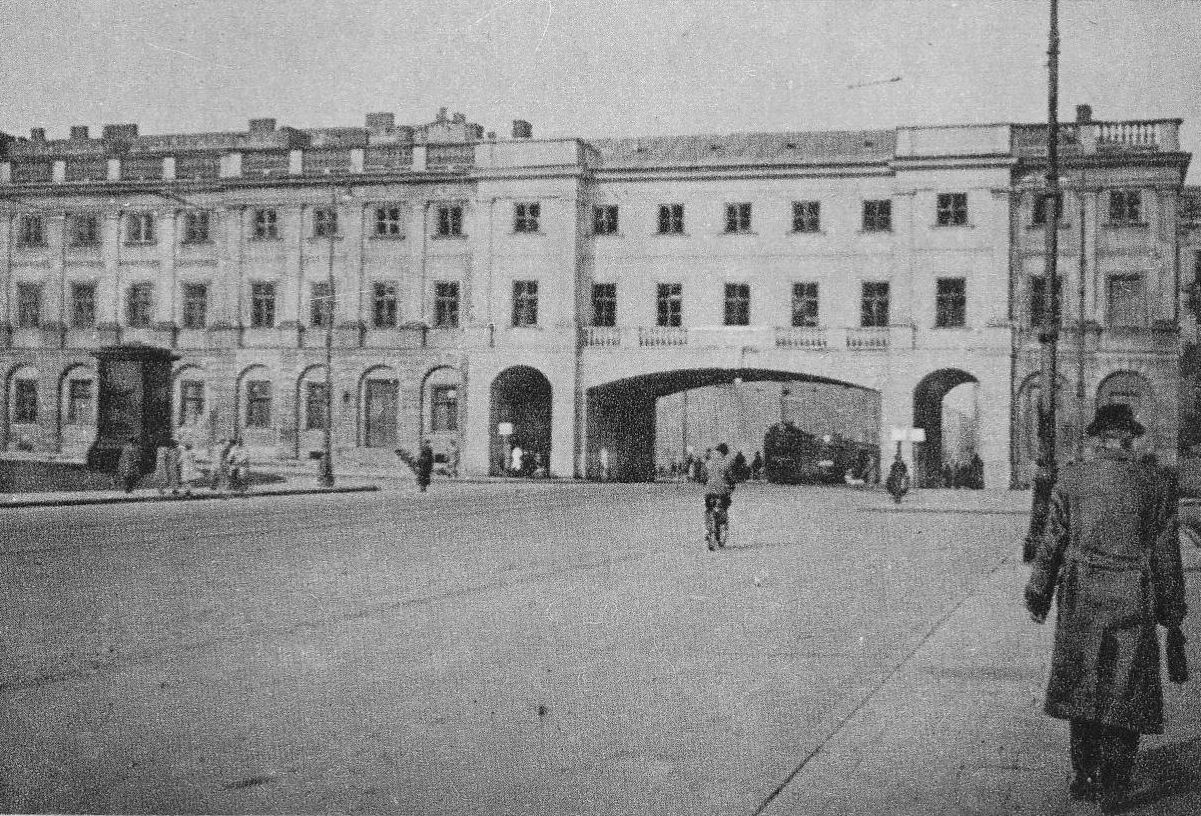
The annex of the Krasiński Palace, which was demolished in 1938 along Bonifraterska Street

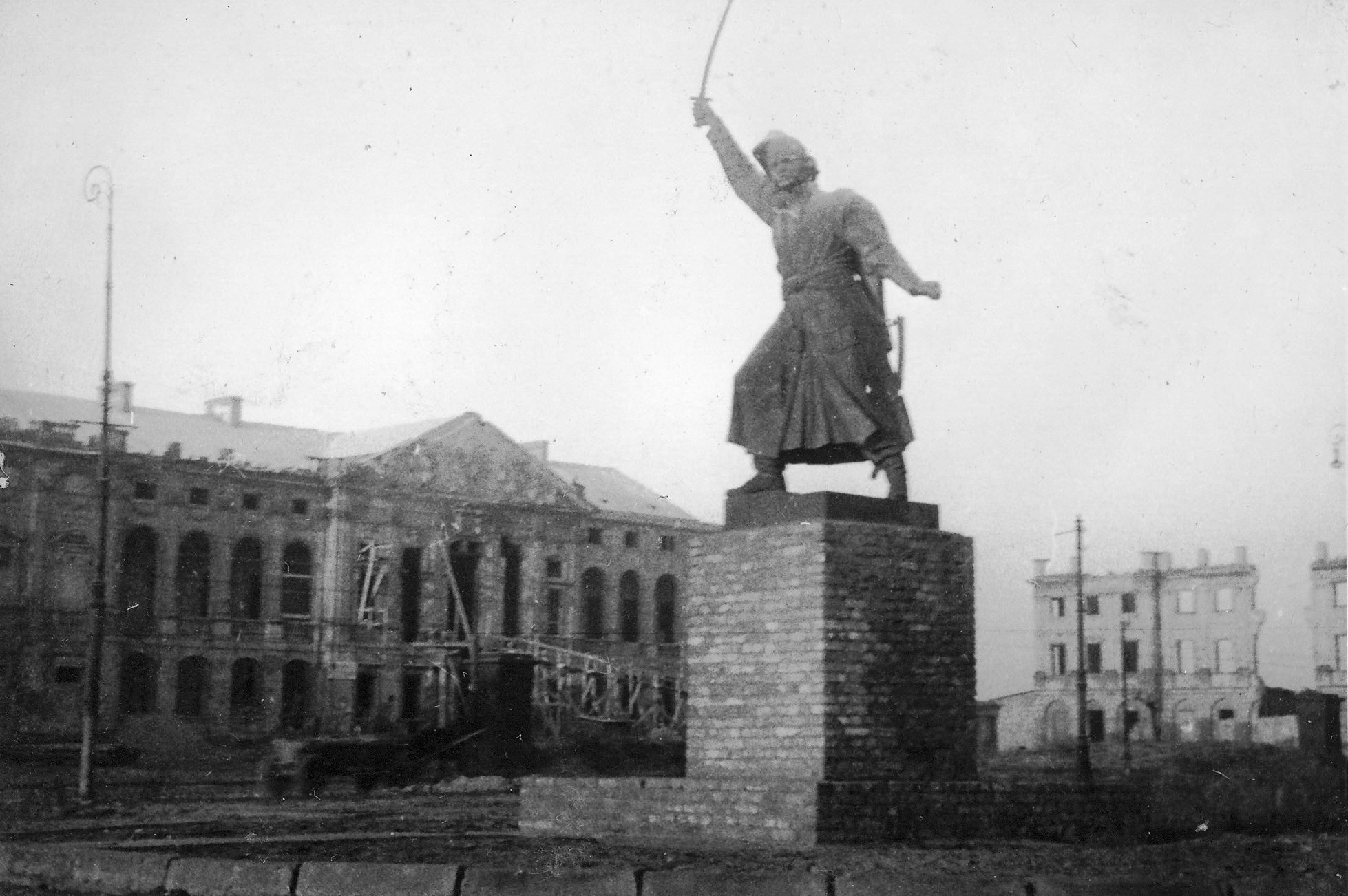
Monument of Jan Kiliński on Krasiński Square in 1945, before relocation to Podwale Street in 1959

After Warsaw’s capitulation in September 1939, the square was one of the sites where Polish soldiers surrendered their weapons.

In November 1940, the square bordered the Warsaw Ghetto, with the northern wing of the Krasiński Palace forming part of the ghetto wall along Świętojerska Street. The passageway in the palace served as a tram gate, allowing trams to pass through the closed district toward Żoliborz. In October 1941, when the area east of Bonifraterska Street was removed from the ghetto, the tram route lay entirely on the “Aryan side.”

From August 1942, the square hosted one of the “folk amusement parks.” In April 1943, as the Warsaw Ghetto Uprising raged, Czesław Miłosz was inspired by people riding a carousel near the burning ghetto to write his poem Campo di Fiori, juxtaposing the loneliness of the dying Jewish fighters with the fate of Giordano Bruno.

During the Warsaw Uprising, at "W hour", on August 1, 1944, insurgents from the “Gozdawa” and “Łukasiński” battalions clashed with German armored units near the square. On August 2, insurgents from the 104th Company of Syndicalists captured the palace, which became the headquarters of the “Parasol” Battalion from August 9 until the fall of the Old Town.

On August 6, 1944, the only military parade of the uprising took place on nearby Długa Street, commemorating the anniversary of the First Cadre Company’s march. Aerial supply drops were also received on the square and in the Krasiński Garden.

By the end of August 1944, the square formed part of the Old Town’s defensive line. At the intersection with Długa Street, there was a sewer entrance, through which thousands of insurgents and civilians escaped to Śródmieście and Żoliborz before the Old Town’s surrender. German forces captured the square on September 2, 1944.

=== After 1945 ===
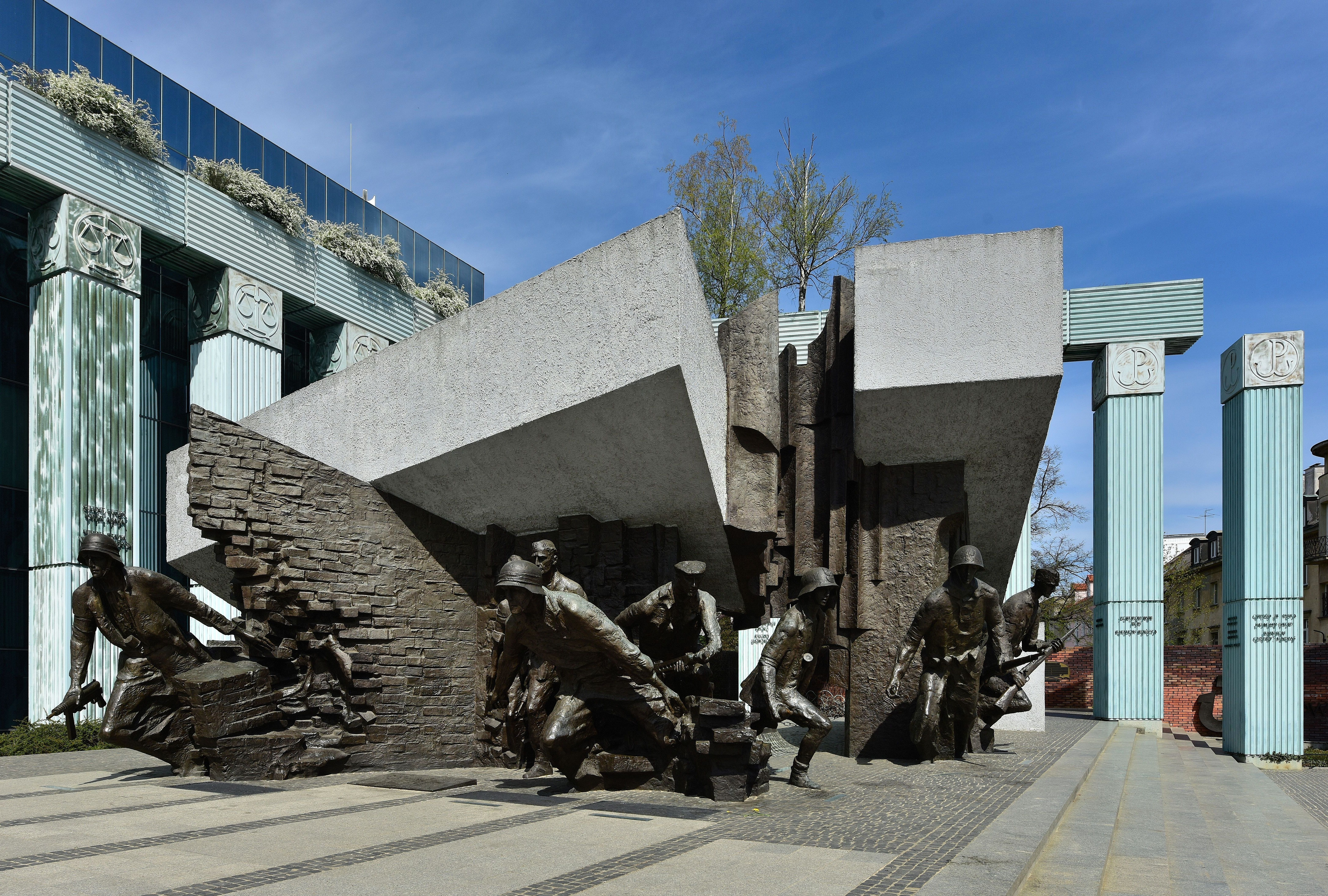
Warsaw Uprising Monument

During the fighting, the Krasiński Palace was heavily damaged, and the remaining buildings were burned by the Germans after they captured the area. After the war, the ruins on Nowiniarska Street were cleared, and before 1958, the Badeni Palace, though well preserved, was also demolished.

In 1965, the urban layout of Krasiński Square was entered into the register of monuments (no. 256/1).

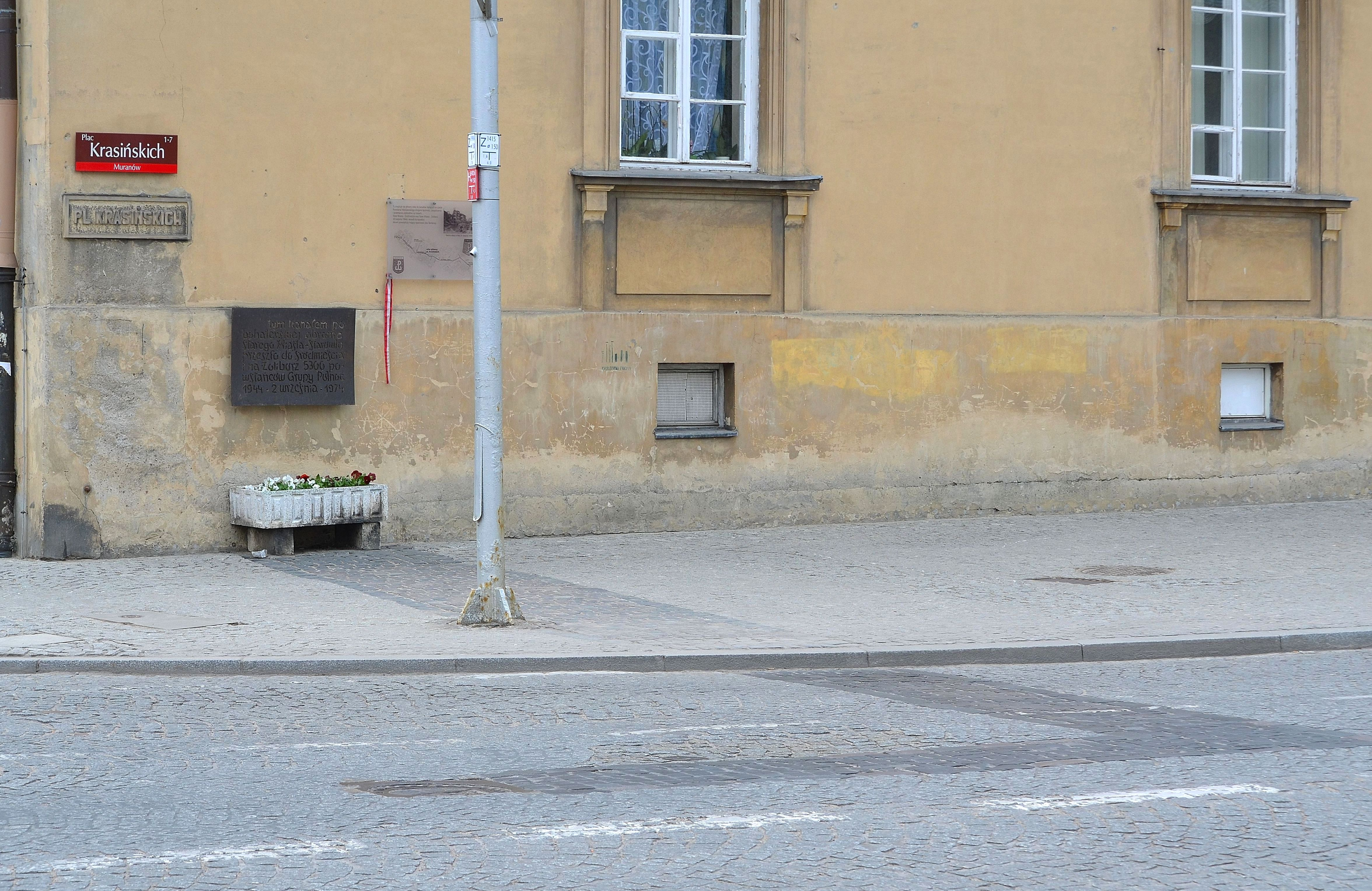
Commemoration of the manhole through which, in 1944 during the Warsaw Uprising, the defenders of the Old Town evacuate

In 1974, a memorial plaque was installed marking the sewer entrance used during the uprising’s evacuation. A dark basalt stone path leads from the former Customs House wall (where the plaque is mounted) to the manhole on the roadway.

In 1989, the Warsaw Uprising Monument was unveiled on the square, depicting realistic figures of insurgents and civilians in battle.

Between 1996 and 1999, the Supreme Court building was erected on the site of the former National Theatre. Its north wing, built where the north annex of the Krasiński Palace once stood, includes a covered passage, echoing Marian Lalewicz’s prewar design. In the 1990s, a 407-space underground parking garage was constructed beneath the square.

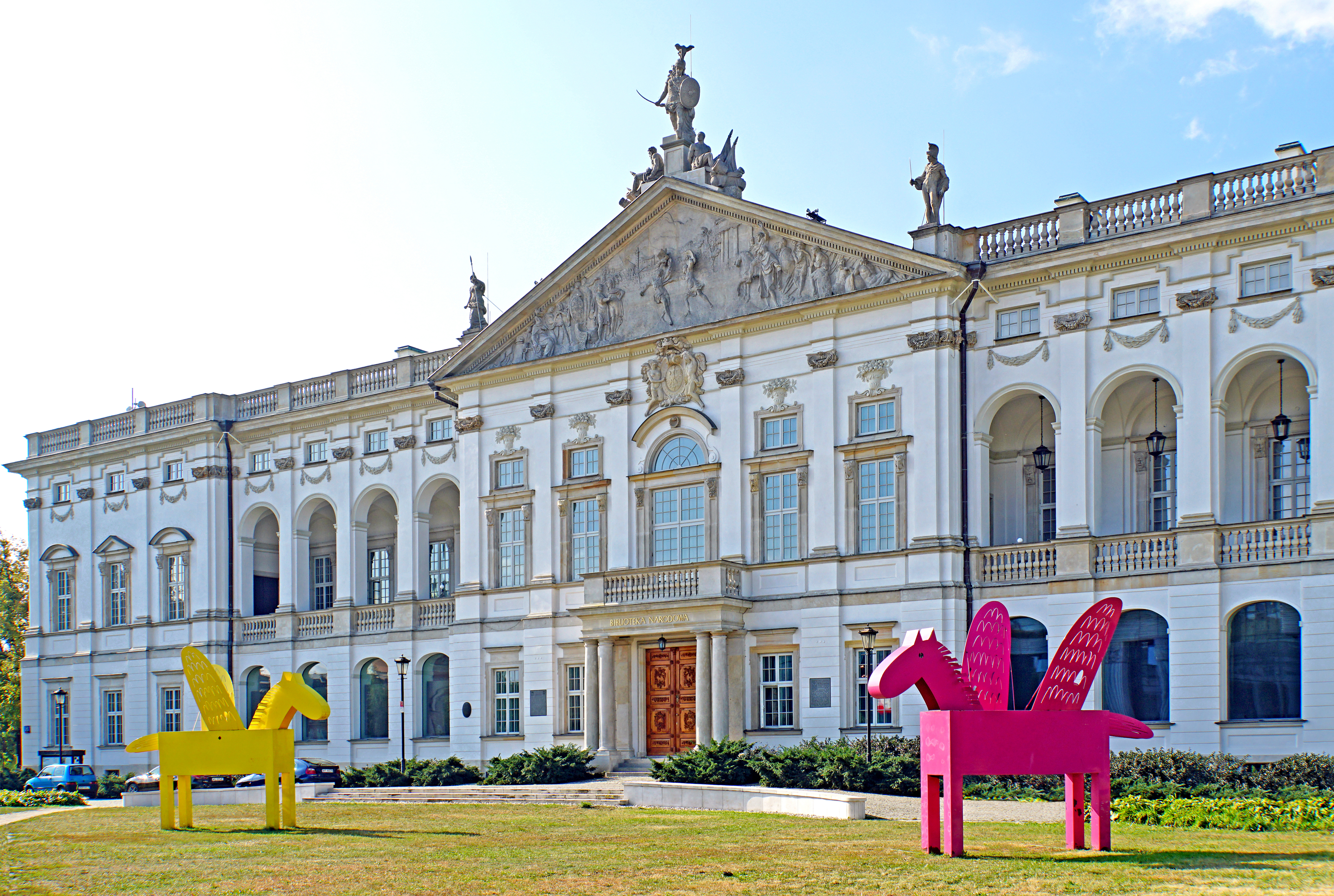
The Pegasus sculptures on the east facade of the Krasiński Palace

In 2008, colorful Pegasus sculptures were displayed in front of the Krasiński Palace as part of the exhibition Norwid – Herbert. Mediterranean Inspirations.

On July 6, 2017, during his official visit to Poland, U.S. President Donald Trump delivered a speech in front of the Warsaw Uprising Monument.

In 2018, during the renovation of the square and Miodowa Street, granite slabs were laid on the sidewalks and granite blocks on the roadway.
