= Christina Oxenberg =

Serbian-American writer, humorist, and fashion designer

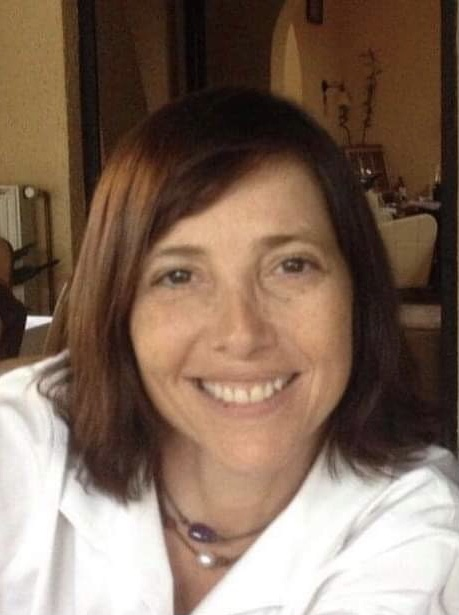
- Oxenberg in 2020
- Born: December 27, 1962 (age 63); New York City, U.S.
- Occupations: Writer; fashion designer
- Years active: 1986–present
- Parents: Howard Oxenberg (father); Princess Elizabeth of Yugoslavia (mother)
- Relatives: Catherine Oxenberg (sister)

Christina Oxenberg (born December 27, 1962) is an American writer, humorist, and fashion designer. She has written seven books, and her writing has been featured in magazines and publications like Allure, The Sunday Times, Huffington Post, and others. Her two knitwear clothing lines, Christina Oxenberg and Ox, have appeared in Barneys, Bloomingdale's, and luxury boutiques throughout the world. Oxenberg is the daughter of Princess Elizabeth of Yugoslavia and is a descendant of the Serbian House of Karađorđević.

== Early life ==
Christina Oxenberg was born in New York City. She is a daughter of Princess Elizabeth of Yugoslavia (born 1936) and her first husband Howard Oxenberg (1919–2010), a Jewish self-made textile and clothing tycoon and close friend of the Kennedy family. Princess Elizabeth is the only daughter of Prince Paul of Yugoslavia (who served as regent for his cousin's eldest son King Peter II of Yugoslavia) and Princess Olga of Greece and Denmark. She has a full sister, Catherine Oxenberg, and a half-brother on her mother's side, Neil Balfour (born 1970). On her father's side she has a half-brother, Robert Oxenberg, and two half-sisters Starr Oxenberg and Ashley Harcourt. She is a first cousin of Prince Edward, Duke of Kent, and also a maternal second cousin of Queen Sofía of Spain, making her a second cousin once removed of King Charles III.

She attended 14 different schools in the United Kingdom, the United States, and Spain, including the Lycée Français Charles de Gaulle in Kensington, and graduated from the Colorado Rocky Mountain School in Carbondale, Colorado, in 1981.

== Career ==
After high school, Oxenberg worked various jobs in New York ranging from a secretary to a roller-rink attendant. She would then go on a backpacking trip around the world before returning to New York City. Upon her return, Oxenberg secured a job at Studio 54. Between 1984 and 1985, she worked as a research assistant for historian, Hugh Montgomery-Massingberd, on his book Blenheim Revisited. In 1986, she published her first book, Taxi, a collection of celebrity anecdotes and personal observations revolving around experiences in taxicabs. In Taxi, Andy Warhol, Bob Costas, Douglas Fairbanks Jr., and numerous others are featured.

In 1994, Simon & Schuster commissioned Oxenberg to write a semi-autobiographical novel that would eventually be published as Royal Blue. The novel was released in 1997 in the United States and was published by Quartet in the United Kingdom in 1998. The book is fictional but contains true elements. The book received generally favorable reviews from publications like The Independent The Guardian, and The Times. As a result of the book, Oxenberg appeared on the cover of New York Magazine and was profiled in People. It was called "darkly funny" by the Chicago Tribune.

In 2000, Oxenberg went on hiatus from writing and took a job at Robert F. Kennedy Jr.'s Waterkeeper Alliance. Through that job she met Fernando Alvarez, a Peruvian businessman living in Banff, Alberta, Canada. The two discussed the possibility of a clothing line using Oxenberg's name. They designed, produced and wholesaled a collection of knitwear. The pair used fibers such as the guanaco from Patagonia, the suri-alpaca from the high Andes and the muskox from the indigenous population in the North West Territories of Canada. From 2002 to 2010, Oxenberg produced two clothing lines (Christina Oxenberg and Ox).

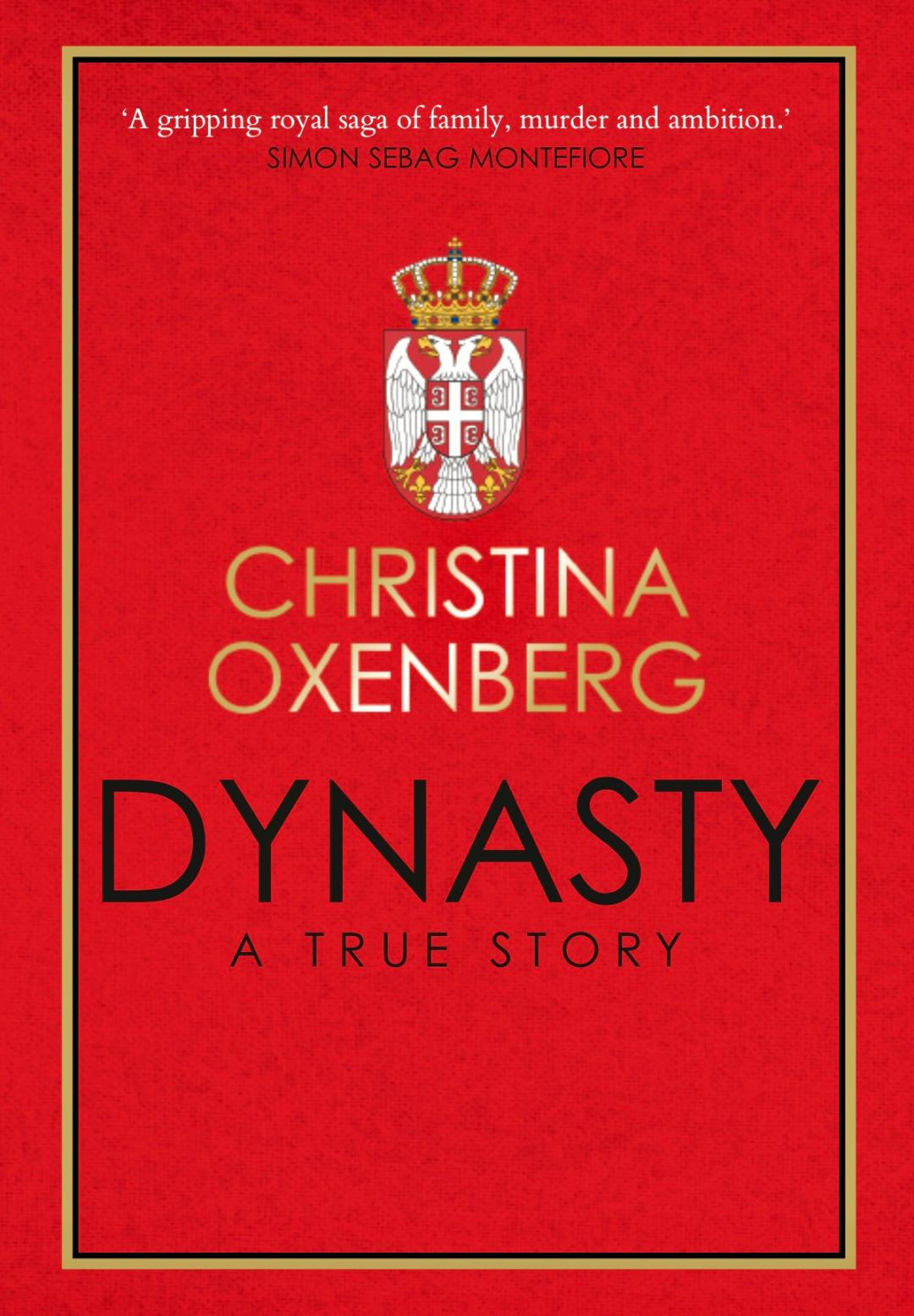
Dynasty cover

Christina Oxenberg would go on to self-publish several collections of short stories between 2010 and 2014, including Do These Gloves Make My Ass Look Fat?, Life is Short: Read Short Stories, and When in Doubt...Double the Dosage. Additionally, her writing has appeared in publications like Allure, Penthouse, The Sunday Times, Takimag (where she published a weekly column), HuffPost (where she currently publishes weekly columns), and others.

In 2011, she moved from the Northeastern United States to Key West, Florida. Many of the stories in her short story collections like Will Write for Compliments and Life is Short: Read Short Stories are about or set in Key West. Since 2012 Oxenberg has contributed articles to Key West weekly magazine Konk Life. In 2014, Oxenberg helped organize a visit by John Hemingway (Ernest Hemingway's grandson) to David Wolkowsky's Tennessee Williams Collection.

In 2015, Christina Oxenberg moved to Serbia for a year to write and research her book, Royal Dynasty – An Insider's History of the Serbian Royal Family, which was published in Serbian in 2015 by the publisher, Laguna. For her work, Oxenberg received an award from the Serbian Academy of Sciences and Arts in 2016. In February 2018, Dynasty: A True Story was published in English in the UK by the publisher, Quartet Books. Subsequently, Oxenberg was interviewed by the Sunday Times, Radio Gorgeous and Tatler, and she presented the book at the Oxford Literary Festival on 22 March 2018.

In 2022, she caused a stir with an interview with the New York Post where she discussed the British royals and their long history of hazing newcomers.

== Bibliography ==
Novels

- Royal Blue (SIMON & SCHUSTER 1997)

Short story collections

- Taxi (QUARTET UK 1986) (non-fiction)
- Do These Gloves Make My Ass Look Fat? (2010)
- Will Write for Compliments (2012)
- Life is Short: Read Short Stories (2013)
- When in Doubt...Double the Dosage: Sharp, Short, Snappy Stories (2014)
- Genius (2015)
- Princess Margaret's Coat (2016)

Autobiographies

- Royal Dynasty – An Insider's History of the Serbian Royal Family (LAGUNA SERBIA 2015)
- DYNASTY – A True Story (QUARTET UK 2017)

== Ancestry ==
Christina Oxenberg is a direct descendant of Karađorđe, a peasant from Šumadija region in today's Serbia, leader of First Serbian Uprising against the Ottomans, and founder of the Karađorđević Dynasty; of King George I of Greece; of Tsar Alexander II of Russia; of King George II of Great Britain, Empress Catherine II of Russia, and William the Conqueror, through Frederick of Mecklenburg-Schwerin.

Oxenberg's maternal grandmother, Princess Olga, was the daughter of Grand Duchess Elena Vladimirovna of Russia and Prince Nicholas of Greece and Denmark, himself the son of another Romanov grand duchess, Queen Olga Konstantinovna of the Hellenes and her Danish-born husband King George of Greece, brother of Queen Alexandra of the United Kingdom and the Empress Maria Fyodorovna. Princess Olga was the sister of Princess Marina, who married Prince George, Duke of Kent (an uncle of Queen Elizabeth II); and Olga/Marina were also paternal first cousins of the Duke of Edinburgh (husband of Queen Elizabeth II) through their respective fathers Prince Nicholas of Greece and Denmark and Prince Andrew of Greece and Denmark, who were brothers.

Ancestors of Christina Oxenberg

8. Israel Oxenberg
4. Jacob Oxenberg
9. Pearl Borveck
2. Howard Oxenberg
10. Bernard Friedman
5. Daisy Friedman
11. Hannah Monthem
1. Christina Oxenberg
24. Alexander Karađorđević, Prince of Serbia
12. Arsen Karađorđević, Prince of Serbia
25. Persida Nenadović
6. Prince Paul of Yugoslavia
26. Pavel Pavlovich Demidov, 2nd Prince of San Donato
13. Princess Aurora Pavlovna Demidova
27. Princess Elena Petrovna Troubetzkaya
3. Princess Elizabeth of Yugoslavia
28. George I of Greece
14. Prince Nicholas of Greece and Denmark
29. Grand Duchess Olga Constantinovna of Russia
7. Princess Olga of Greece and Denmark
30. Grand Duke Vladimir Alexandrovich of Russia
15. Grand Duchess Elena Vladimirovna of Russia
31. Duchess Marie of Mecklenburg-Schwerin
