= Prince Nikola of Yugoslavia =

Yugoslavian prince (1928–1954)

Prince Nikola
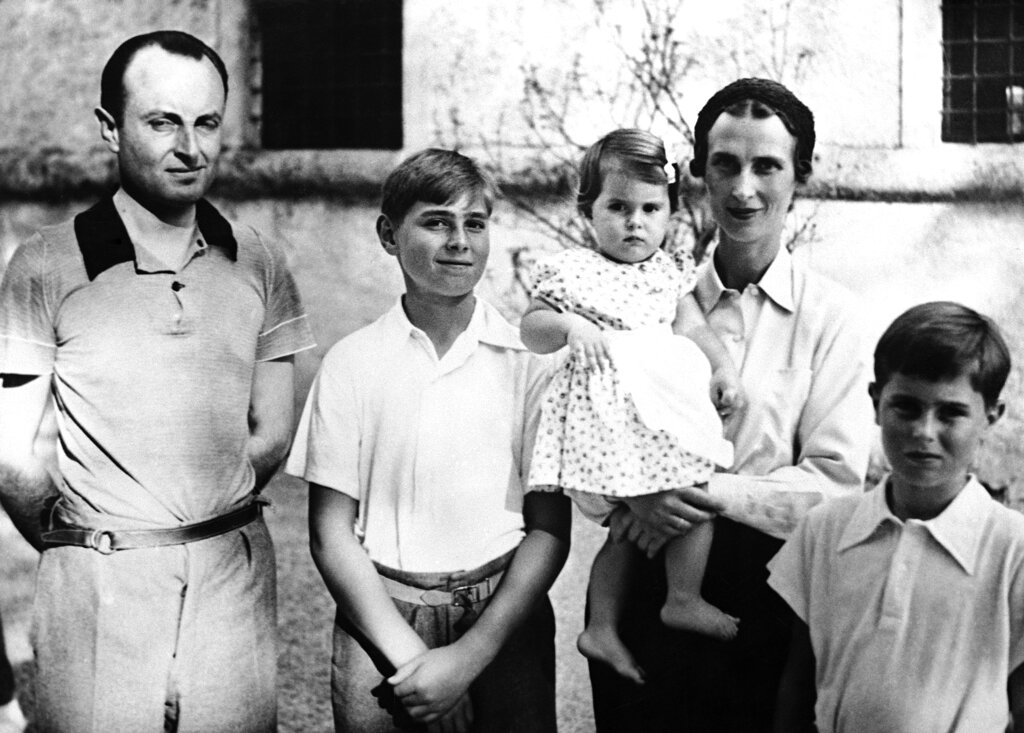
- Nikola (at right) with his parents and siblings, at Castle Brdo in Slovenia (1937).
- Born: 29 June 1928; London, England
- Died: 12 April 1954 (aged 25); Slough, Berkshire, England
- Burial: St. George's Church, Serbia
- House: Karađorđević
- Father: Paul, Prince Regent of Yugoslavia
- Mother: Princess Olga of Greece and Denmark

Prince Nikola of Yugoslavia (29 June 1928 – 12 April 1954), also known in Britain as Prince Nicholas and in Serbia as Nikola Karađorđević (Serbian Cyrillic: Никола Карађорђевић), was the younger son of Prince Paul of Yugoslavia by his wife Princess Olga of Greece and Denmark.

Born in London, he died in a road accident in the UK.

== Biography ==
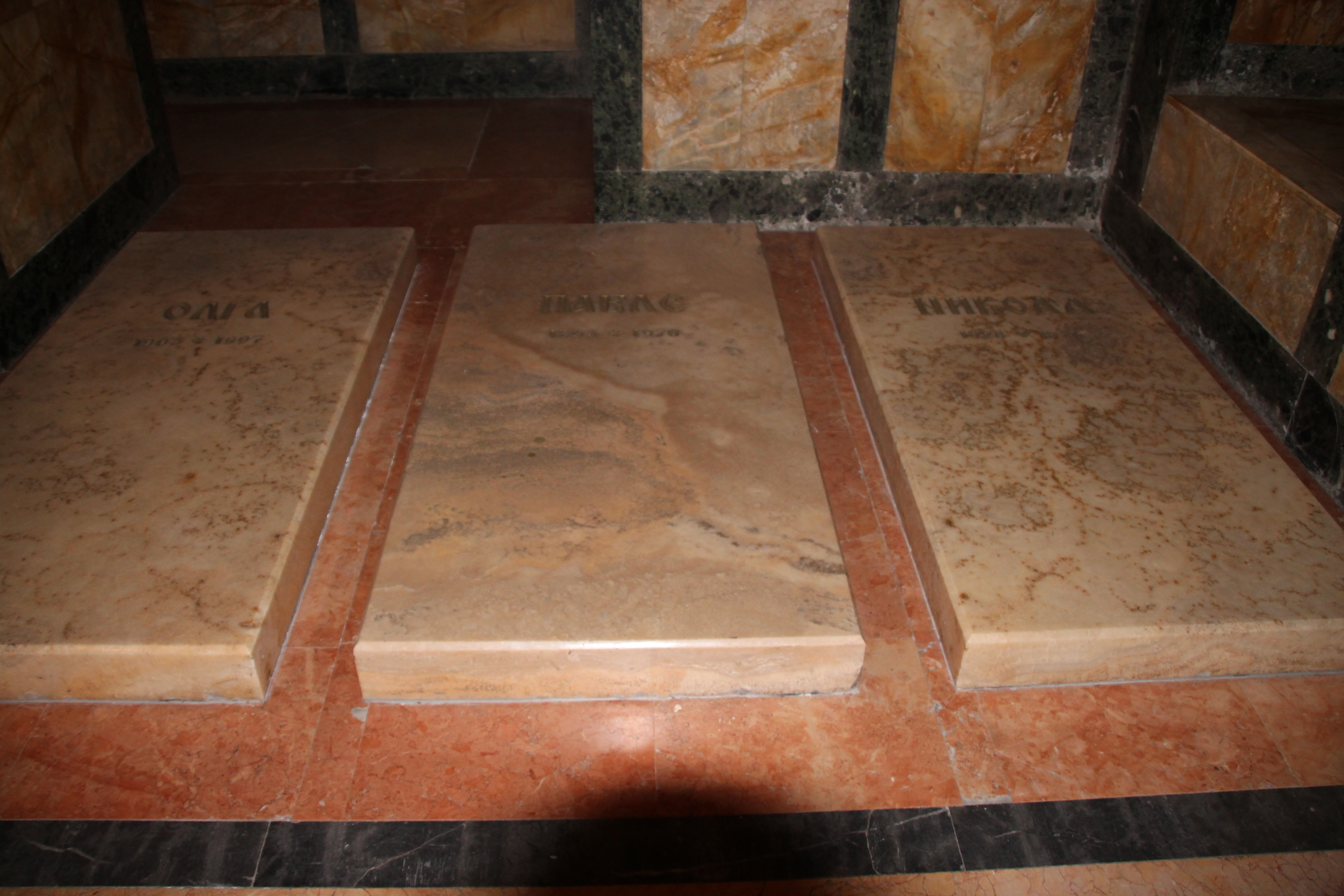
Tombs of Princess Olga, Prince Paul and Prince Nikola in the Karađorđević family vault at St. George's Church in Oplenac (2012)

Prince Nikola was born into the House of Karađorđević, the dynasty that ruled Serbia and later the Kingdom of Yugoslavia. Known as "Nicky", he was educated in England at Oxford University and was a frequent social escort to Princess Margaret, sister of Queen Elizabeth II. The press often linked them romantically and speculated on a possible marriage between them.

Prince Nikola died unmarried in 1954, survived by his parents, Prince Paul and Princess Olga of Yugoslavia; older brother Prince Alexander and younger sister, Princess Elizabeth; also his maternal grandmother, Grand Duchess Elena Vladimirovna of Russia (Princess Nicholas of Greece and Denmark) and his maternal aunts, Princess Elizabeth, Countess of Toerring-Jettenbach, and Princess Marina, Duchess of Kent.

== Death ==
Nikola died in a road accident at Datchet, now in Berkshire, England, some five miles from the home of his aunt, the Duchess of Kent. He was driving himself alone towards London, on his way to a meeting with Princess Margaret the same evening, to attend a full-dress rehearsal of a play being performed by a group of young socialites. His car was found overturned in a ditch by the side of the road, and he was injured but alive. He was taken to a hospital in Slough, but his life could not be saved.

He was buried at the Bois-de-Vaux Cemetery, Lausanne, Switzerland. On 28 September 2012, his remains were exhumed from the cemetery in Lausanne and transferred to Serbia. Together with his parents, he was reburied in the Karađorđević family mausoleum in Oplenac, near Topola, on 6 October 2012.

== Ancestry ==
He was a paternal grandson of Arsen Karađorđević, Prince of Serbia and Princess Aurora Pavlovna Demidova di San Donato. He was a maternal grandson of Prince Nicholas of Greece and Denmark and Grand Duchess Elena Vladimirovna of Russia.

Ancestors of Prince Nikola of Yugoslavia

16. Karađorđe Petrović
8. Alexander Karađorđević, Prince of Serbia
17. Jelena Jovanović
4. Prince Arsen of Yugoslavia
18. Jevrem Nenadović
9. Persida Nenadović
19. Jovanka Milovanović
2. Prince Paul of Yugoslavia
20. Count Pavel Nikolaievich Demidov
10. Pavel Pavlovich Demidov, 2nd Prince of San Donato
21. Aurora Stjernvall
5. Princess Aurora Pavlovna Demidova
22. Prince Pyotr Nikitich Trubetzkoy
11. Princess Elena Petrovna Troubetzkaya
23. Princess Elizaveta Esperovna Belossel'ska-Belozerska
1. Prince Nikola of Yugoslavia
24. Christian IX of Denmark
12. George I of Greece
25. Princess Louise of Hesse-Kassel
6. Prince Nicholas of Greece and Denmark
26. Grand Duke Konstantin Nikolayevich of Russia
13. Grand Duchess Olga Constantinovna of Russia
27. Princess Alexandra of Saxe-Altenburg
3. Princess Olga of Greece and Denmark
28. Alexander II of Russia
14. Grand Duke Vladimir Alexandrovich of Russia
29. Princess Marie of Hesse and by Rhine
7. Grand Duchess Elena Vladimirovna of Russia
30. Frederick Francis II, Grand Duke of Mecklenburg-Schwerin
15. Duchess Marie of Mecklenburg-Schwerin
31. Princess Augusta Reuss of Köstritz
