= Grand Duchess Elena Vladimirovna of Russia =

Princess Nicholas of Greece and Denmark (1882–1957)

- Princess Nicholas of Greece and Denmark
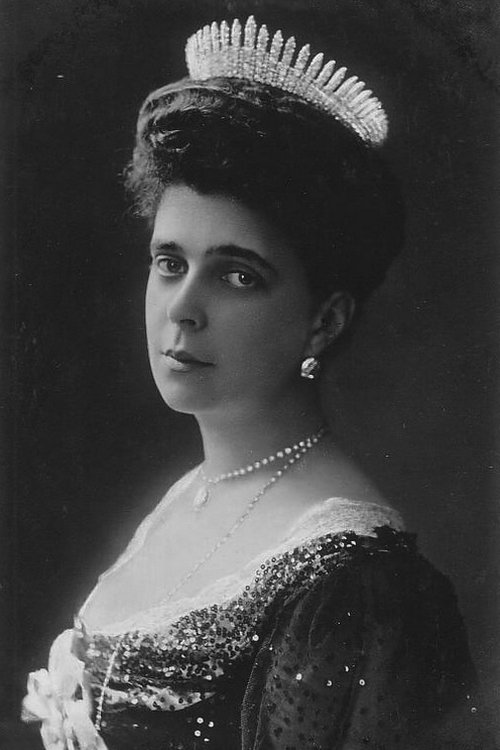
- Elena, circa 1913
- Born: 29 January 1882; Saint Petersburg, Russian Empire
- Died: 13 March 1957 (aged 75); Athens, Kingdom of Greece
- Burial: Royal Cemetery, Tatoi Palace, Greece
- Spouse: Prince Nicholas of Greece and Denmark (m. 1902; died 1938)
- Issue: Olga, Princess Paul of Yugoslavia; Princess Elizabeth, Countess of Toerring-Jettenbach; Princess Marina, Duchess of Kent
- House: Holstein-Gottorp-Romanov
- Father: Grand Duke Vladimir Alexandrovich of Russia
- Mother: Duchess Marie of Mecklenburg-Schwerin

Grand Duchess Elena Vladimirovna of Russia (Russian: Елена Владимировна Романова, romanized: Yelena Vladimirovna Romanova; 29 January 1882 – 13 March 1957) was the only daughter and youngest child of Grand Duke Vladimir Alexandrovich of Russia and Duchess Marie of Mecklenburg-Schwerin. Her husband was Prince Nicholas of Greece and Denmark; they were both first cousins of Emperor Nicholas II of Russia. She was also the first cousin of Alexandrine of Mecklenburg-Schwerin, Queen of Denmark, and the maternal grandmother of Prince Edward, Duke of Kent, Princess Alexandra, and Prince Michael of Kent. Queen Juliana of the Netherlands was also her half-first cousin.

== Early life ==
Elena and her three surviving older brothers, Kirill, Boris, and Andrei, had an English nanny and spoke English as their first language. The young Elena had a temper and was sometimes out of control. At four years old, she posed for the artist Henry Jones Thaddeus. She grabbed a paper knife and threatened her nurse, who hid behind Thaddeus. "The little lady then transferred her attentions to me, her black eyes ablaze with fury," recalled Thaddeus. Elena, raised by a mother who was highly conscious of her social status, was also considered snobbish by some. "Poor little thing, I feel sorry for her," wrote her mother's social rival, Dowager Empress Maria Feodorovna, "for she is really quite sweet, but vain and pretty grandiose."

== Marriage and children ==
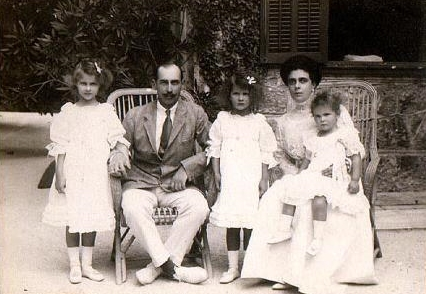
The family, circa 1908

She was engaged to Prince Max of Baden, but Max backed out of the engagement. Elena's mother was furious and society gossiped about Elena's difficulty in finding a husband. At one point in 1899, the 17-year-old Elena was reputedly engaged to Archduke Franz Ferdinand of Austria; however, this came to nothing as he fell in love with Countess Sophie Chotek. In 1902, Princess Beatrice of Bourbon tried to convince her brother Jaime to marry Elena.

Prince Nicholas of Greece and Denmark, the third son of George I of Greece, first proposed in 1900, but Elena's mother was reluctant to allow her daughter to marry a younger son with no real fortune or prospects of inheriting a throne. She finally agreed to let Elena marry Nicholas, who was Elena's second cousin through his mother Olga Constantinovna of Russia and her father Vladimir Alexandrovich of Russia, in 1902 after it became clear that no other offers were on the horizon.

The couple married on 29 August 1902 in Tsarskoye Selo, Russia. Like many imperial weddings, it was a grand affair, and was attended by the Emperor and Empress of Russia, the King and Queen of the Hellenes, among other royals and nobility of Russia.

Elena's "grand manner" irritated some people at court. According to the British diplomat Francis Elliot, there was an incident between Elena and her sister-in-law Princess Marie Bonaparte: Allegedly, Elena refused to greet Marie and "drew back her skirts as if not to be touched by her." Elena thought that Marie was beneath her, because her grandfather operated the Monte Carlo Casino. Elena looked down on another sister-in-law Princess Alice of Battenberg because of the latter's morganatic blood. The Dowager Empress wrote that Elena "has a very brusque and arrogant tone that can shock people."

=== Wealth and residences ===
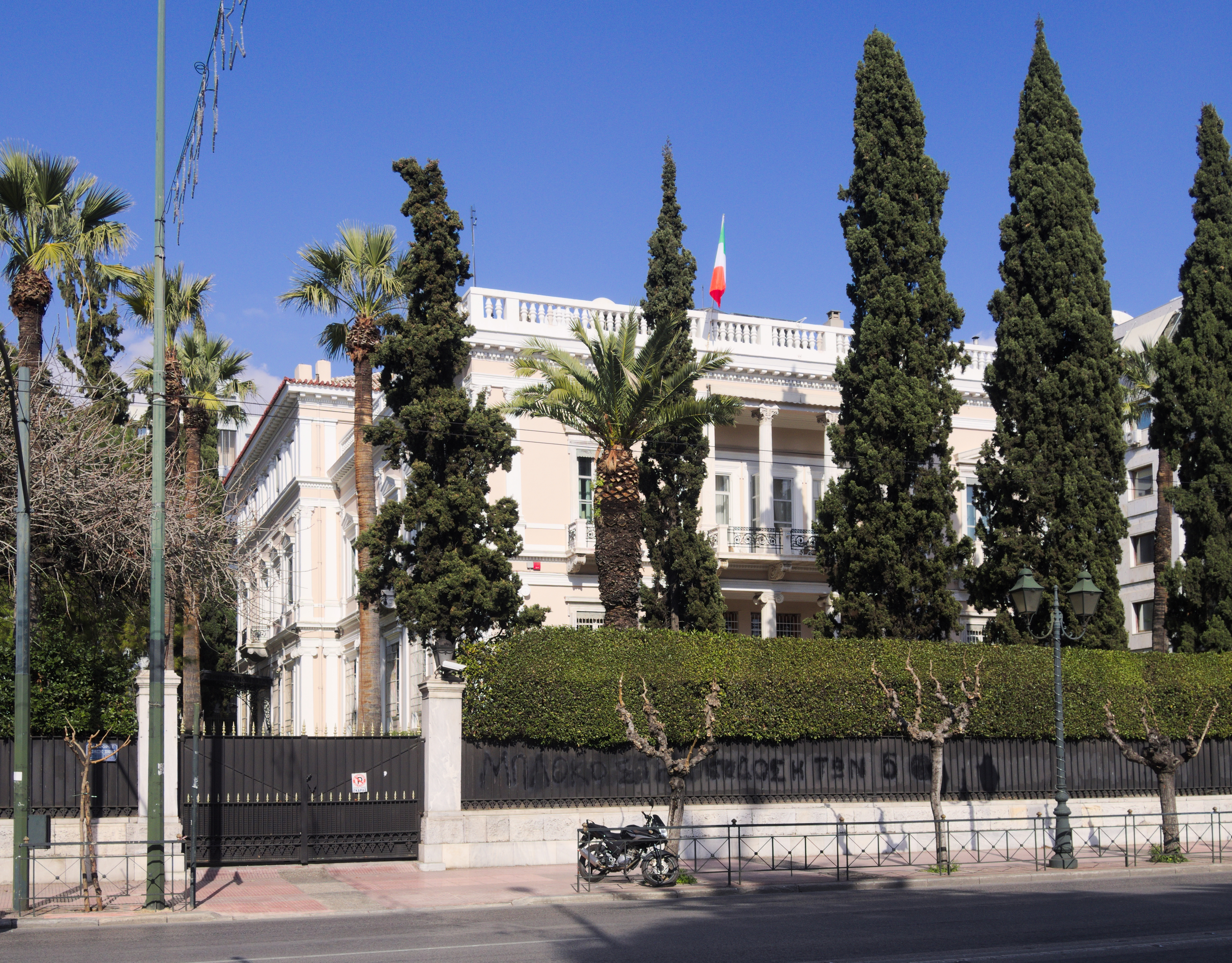
The Nicholas Palace in Athens (now the Embassy of Italy)

As a Russian grand duchess, Elena had been received an annuity of 15,000 roubles each year from birth, allowing her to accumulate a private fortune of approximately 300,000 roubles. Upon her marriage her annuity ceased, and instead she received the customary imperial dowry of a Russian Grand Duchess, amounting to 1,000,000 roubles. This amount was then equivalent to approximately US $500,000 (equivalent to $18,605,769 in 2025). The dowry capital was held in Russia, from which Elena was paid an annual income of 50,000 roubles.

After a honeymoon at Ropsha, Elena and Nicholas travelled to the Kingdom of Greece aboard the Amphitrite and settled in a wing of the Royal Palace in Athens whilst their own residence was prepared.

In late 1902 they purchased a large house near the city centre, which was thereafter known as the Nicholas Palace. The building is a neoclassical residence on Vasilissis Sofias Avenue, which was designed by Ernst Ziller for banker Stefanos Psycha during the 1880s. Elena commissioned the royal architect Anastasios Metaxas to enlarge it with a Ziller-inspired second block, linked by a glazed atrium that illuminated the mansion’s core works. Contemporaries described the Nicholas Palace as very modern for its time, with hot and cold running water.

Elena and Nicholas reportedly led a relatively simple but comfortable life in Athens. During the early years of their marriage, Elen's dowry and private fortune formed the bulk of the couple’s income. Prince and Princess Nicholas took up residence at the newly-renovated Nicholas Palace in 1904.

The advent of the Russian Revolution in 1917 and the exile of the Greek Royal Family in 1923, had a significant impact on the couple's income. And as a result, the Nicholas Palace was leased to the Hotel Grande Bretagne during the 1920s, who used the building as a 60-bed luxury annex known as the “Petit Palais”. The House was later rented by the Norwegian Embassy in 1930 and, by the Italian Embassy in 1933. The Italian Government later purchased the Nicholas Palace from Elena in 1955; the site has subsequently remained the home of the Italian Embassy in Athens ever since.

=== Issue ===
Prince and Princess Nicholas of Greece and Denmark had three daughters:

- Princess Olga of Greece and Denmark (11 June 1903 – 16 October 1997); married Prince Paul of Yugoslavia (1893–1976) in 1923 and had issue:
  - Prince Alexander of Yugoslavia (1924–2016); married firstly to Princess Maria Pia of Savoy (b. 1934) from 1955 to 1967 and had issue; married secondly to Princess Barbara of Liechtenstein (b. 1942) in 1973 and had issue.
  - Prince Nikola of Yugoslavia (1928–1954); did not marry and had no issue.
  - Princess Elizabeth of Yugoslavia (b. 1936); married firstly to Howard Oxenberg (1919-2010) from 1961 to 1966 and had issue; married secondly to Neil Balfour (b. 1944) from 1969 to 1978 and had issue; married thirdly to Manuel Ulloa Elías (1922–1992) in 1987, no issue.
- Princess Elizabeth of Greece and Denmark (24 May 1904 – 11 January 1955); married Carl Theodor, Count of Törring-Jettenbach (1900-1967) in 1934 and had issue:
  - Hans Veit, Count of Törring-Jettenbach (b. 1935); married Princess Henriette of Hohenlohe-Bartenstein (b. 1938) in 1964 and had issue.
  - Countess Helene of Törring-Jettenbach (b. 1937); married Archduke Ferdinand Karl Max of Austria (1918–2004) in 1956 and had issue.
- Princess Marina of Greece and Denmark (13 December 1906 – 27 August 1968); married Prince George, Duke of Kent (1902–1942) in 1934 and had issue:
  - Prince Edward, Duke of Kent (b. 1935); married Katharine Worsley (1933–2025) in 1961 and had issue.
  - Princess Alexandra of Kent (b. 1936); married The Hon. Sir Angus Ogilvy (1928–2004) in 1963 and had issue.
  - Prince Michael of Kent (b. 1942); married Baroness Marie-Christine von Reibnitz (b. 1945) in 1978 and had issue.

Grand Duchess Elena suffered from ill health after the birth of Princess Marina, which caused her husband anguish.

According to her niece, Princess Sophie of Greece, Grand Duchess Elena's priorities throughout her life remained as follows: “God first, the Grand Dukes of Russia then and finally everything else.” Thus, the Grand Duchess and her husband, Prince Nicholas, visited Russia annually to visit their relatives.

== Life in exile ==
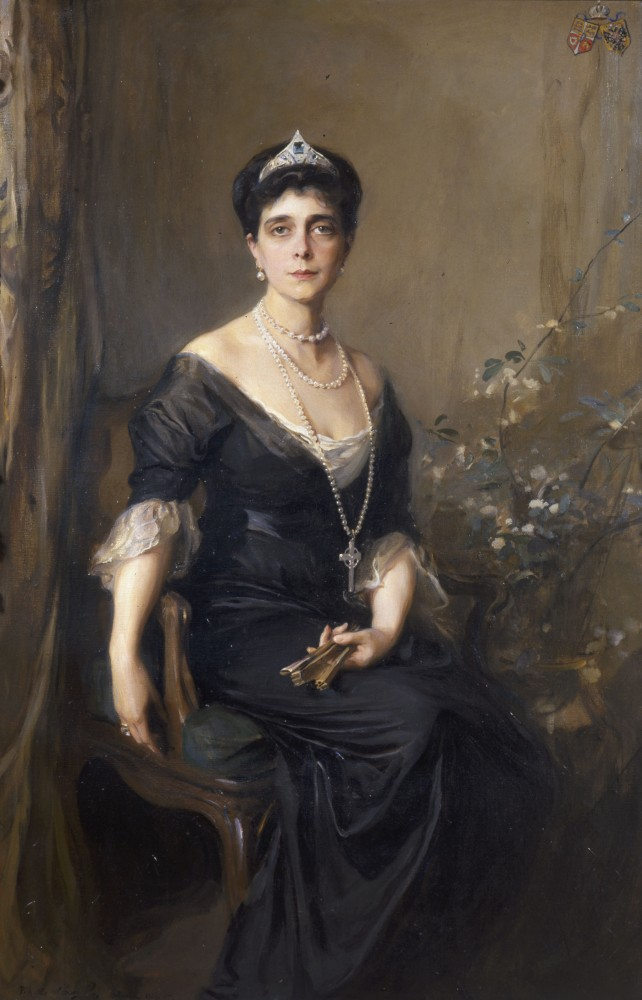
Portrait by Philip de László, 1914

The family was later affected by the turmoil of the Russian Revolution of 1917 and the subsequent turmoil in Greece, which became a republic and resulted in the family living in France for a time.

While living in France, Grand Duchess Elena became deeply involved in charity work for Russian exiles, particularly children. Short of money due to their exile from Greece and the loss of their Russian income, Prince Nicholas and his family lived in reduced circumstances. Grand Duchess Elena's jewel collection, as well as Prince Nicholas' own artwork, were their sources of income.

Princess Olga of Greece married Prince Paul of Yugoslavia; Princess Elizabeth of Greece married Count Karl Theodor zu Toerring-Jettenbach, son of Duchess Sophie Adelheid in Bavaria and scion of an old and rich Bavarian mediatized family; and Princess Marina of Greece married Prince George, Duke of Kent in November 1934.

Grand Duchess Elena became a widow early in 1938, as Prince Nicholas suffered a heart attack and died suddenly. She remained in Greece throughout the Second World War, dying there in 1957. She bequeathed her personal library to the Anavryta School.

Her diaries during the period of the Second World War (1941–1946), written in English, were translated into Greek and published by Ioanna Varvalouka in 2024.

== Sources ==
- Charlotte Zeepvat, The Camera and the Tsars: A Romanov Family Album, Sutton Publishing, 2004, ISBN 0-7509-3049-7
