= Oplenac =

- St George's Church in Oplenac
- Опленац
- Црква Светог Ђорђа на Опленцу; Crkva Svetog Đorđa na Oplencu
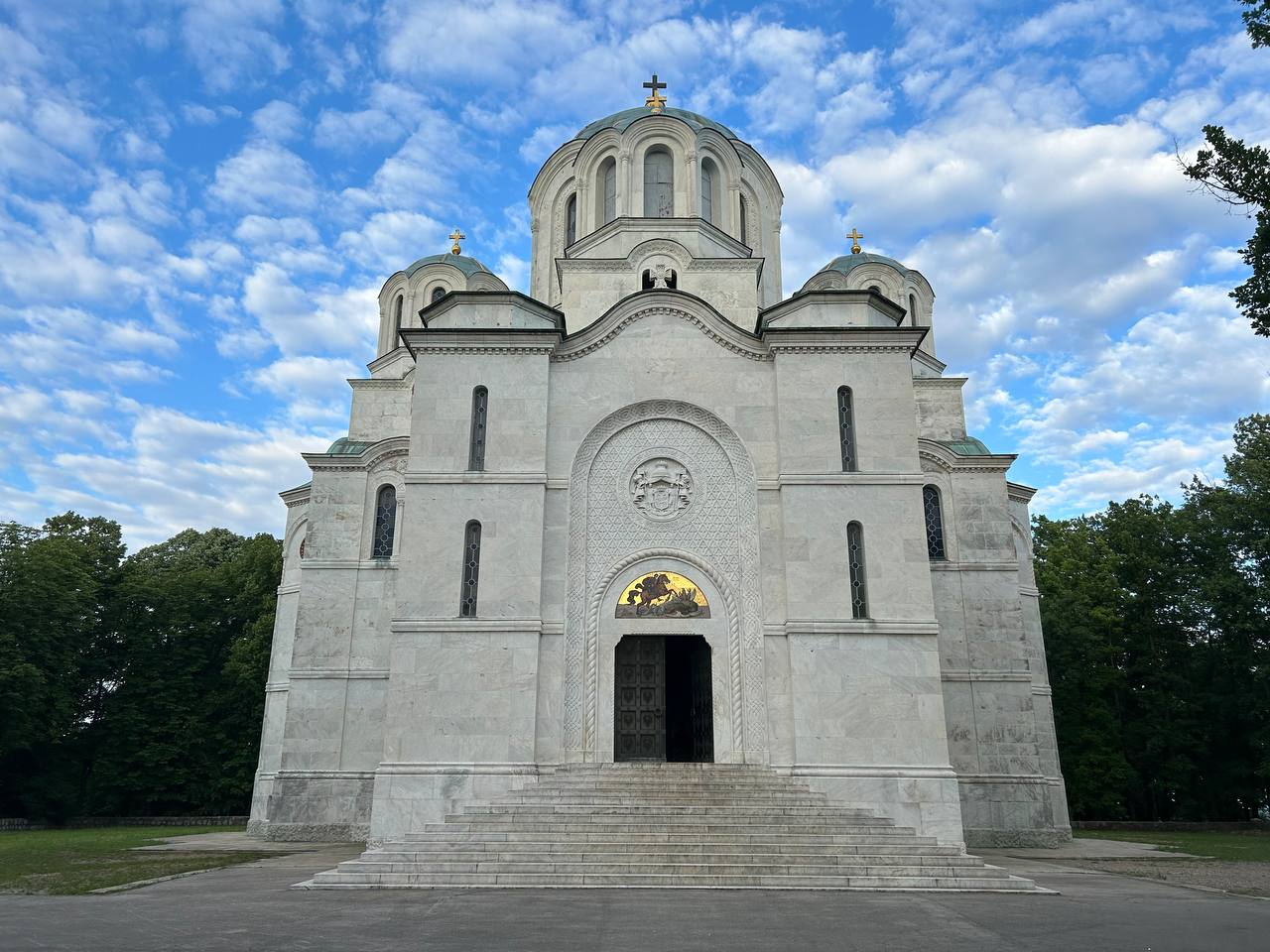
- St George's Church
- Oplenac
- 44°14′50″N 20°41′0″E
- Location: Topola
- Country: Serbia
- Denomination: Eastern Orthodox
- Website: oplenac.rs

History
- Status: Church
- Founded: 1910; 116 years ago
- Founder: Peter I of Serbia
- Dedication: Saint George

Architecture
- Functional status: Active
- Heritage designation: Monument of Culture of Exceptional Importance
- Designated: 1979
- Style: Morava School

Specifications
- Materials: Stone

The St. George's Church in Oplenac (Serbian Cyrillic: Црква Светог Ђорђа на Опленцу, romanized: Crkva Svetog Đorđa na Oplencu), also known as Oplenac (Опленац), is the mausoleum of the Serbian and Yugoslav royal house of Karađorđević located on top of the Oplenac Hill in the town of Topola, Serbia. The church of Oplenac was founded by King Peter I of Serbia. Many members of the royal house are buried in the church, in the crypt beneath the church, or in the church yard.

== Mausoleum ==
Apart from the two tombs inside the church (Karađorđe’s in the southern apse; and Peter I in the northern apse), there are 26 other members of the dynasty whose eternal place of rest is in this mausoleum. Six generations of the Karađorđević family have been buried in this church:

1. The first generation: Marica Živković, Karađorđe's mother.
2. The second generation: Karađorđe (in the church) and his wife Jelena Jovanović (1764–1842).
3. The third generation: Karađorđe's son Alexander and his wife Persida Nenadović (1813–1873).
4. The fourth generation: Alexander and Persida's nine children. As follows: Kleopatra (1835–1855), Aleksije (1836–1840), Svetozar (1841–1847), Jelena (1846–1867), Andreja (1848–1864), Jelisaveta (1851– 1852), Đorđe (1856–1888), Arsenije, and Peter I (in the church) and his wife Ljubica also known as Zorka (she is buried in the crypt). Out of the ten children of Prince Alexander and Princess Persida, only their oldest daughter, Poleksija (1833–1914), was not buried here, though Poleksija's daughter Persida Ida Nikolaijevic (1860–1945) is buried here.
5. The fifth generation, Peter I and Zorka's children: Milena (1886–1887), George and his wife Radmila Radonjić (1907–1993), Alexander I and his wife Maria and Andrija (1890–1890, lived only for 23 days). Also Prince Arsen's son Paul and his wife Olga.
6. The sixth generation: King Alexander I and Queen Maria's children: Peter II and his wife Alexandra, Tomislav, and Andrew. Also Prince Paul's sons Nikola and Alexander.

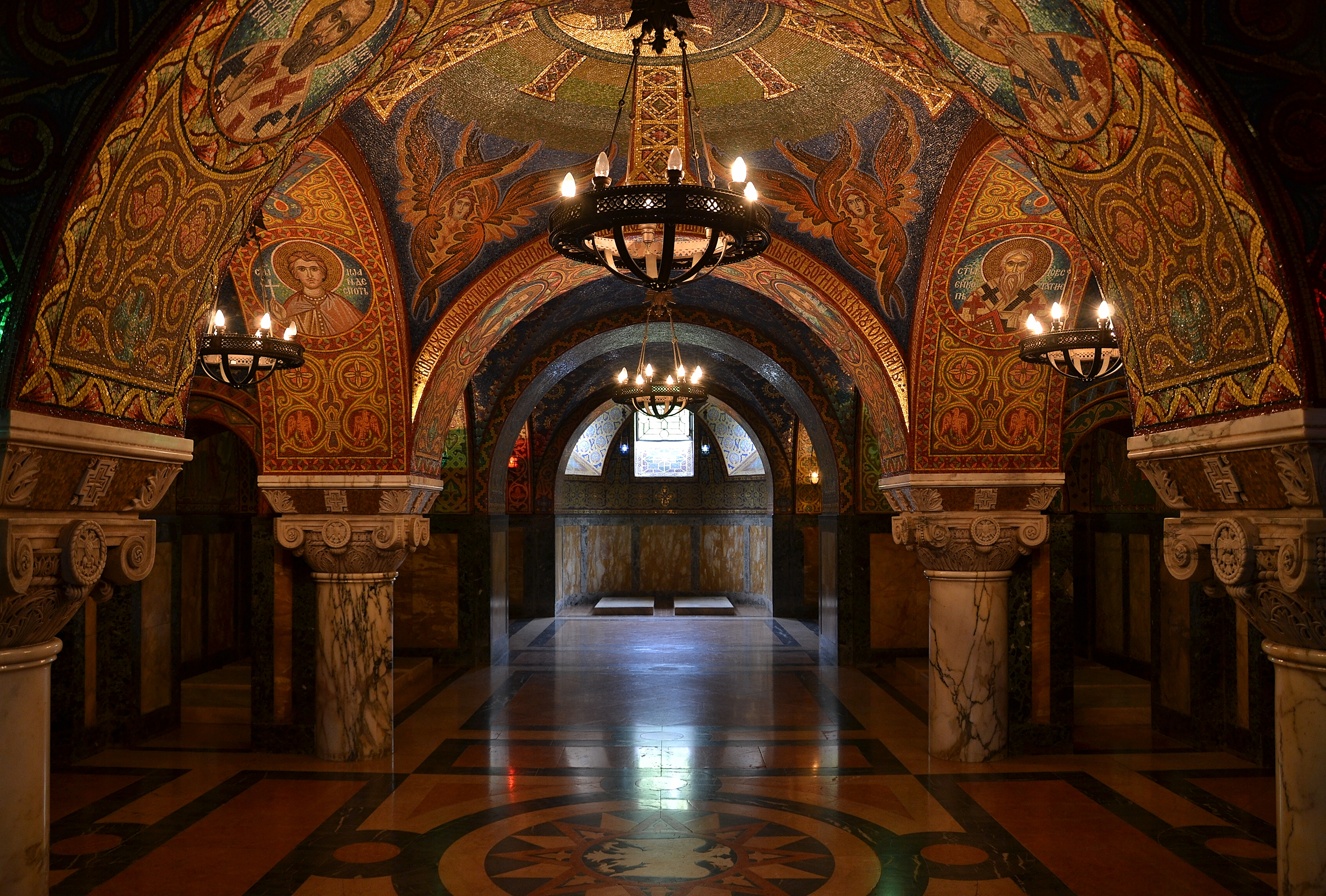
Crypt of the Church.

Out of the 28 tombs of the Karađorđević dynasty, six of them belong to rulers: Supreme Leader Karađorđe, Prince Alexander, King Peter I, King Alexander I, Prince Paul, and King Peter II. The royal mausoleum at Oplenac is an important site in Serbian history and the traditional burial place of the Karađorđević dynasty.

On 6 October 2012, Prince Paul, his wife Olga and his son Nikola were all buried here after their remains were exhumed from the Bois-de-Vaux Cemetery in Lausanne, and returned to Serbia.

On 26 May 2013, Queen Maria, her sons King Peter II and Prince Andrew, and Peter II's wife Queen Alexandra, were all buried here after their remains were exhumed from Frogmore in Britain, the Saint Sava Monastery in Libertyville, Illinois, the cemetery of New Gračanica, also in Illinois, and Tatoi Palace in Greece respectively, and returned to Serbia.

== History ==
In the 19th century this area was covered in woods. The term Oplenac most probably derives from "oplen", meaning wooden parts on ox cars. Karađorđe had settled here, built vineyards and orchards, and established the defence of the nearby Topola. His son Alexander built new buildings and renewed his father's vineyards and orchards. It was not until the arrival of King Peter I that this place got its true importance.

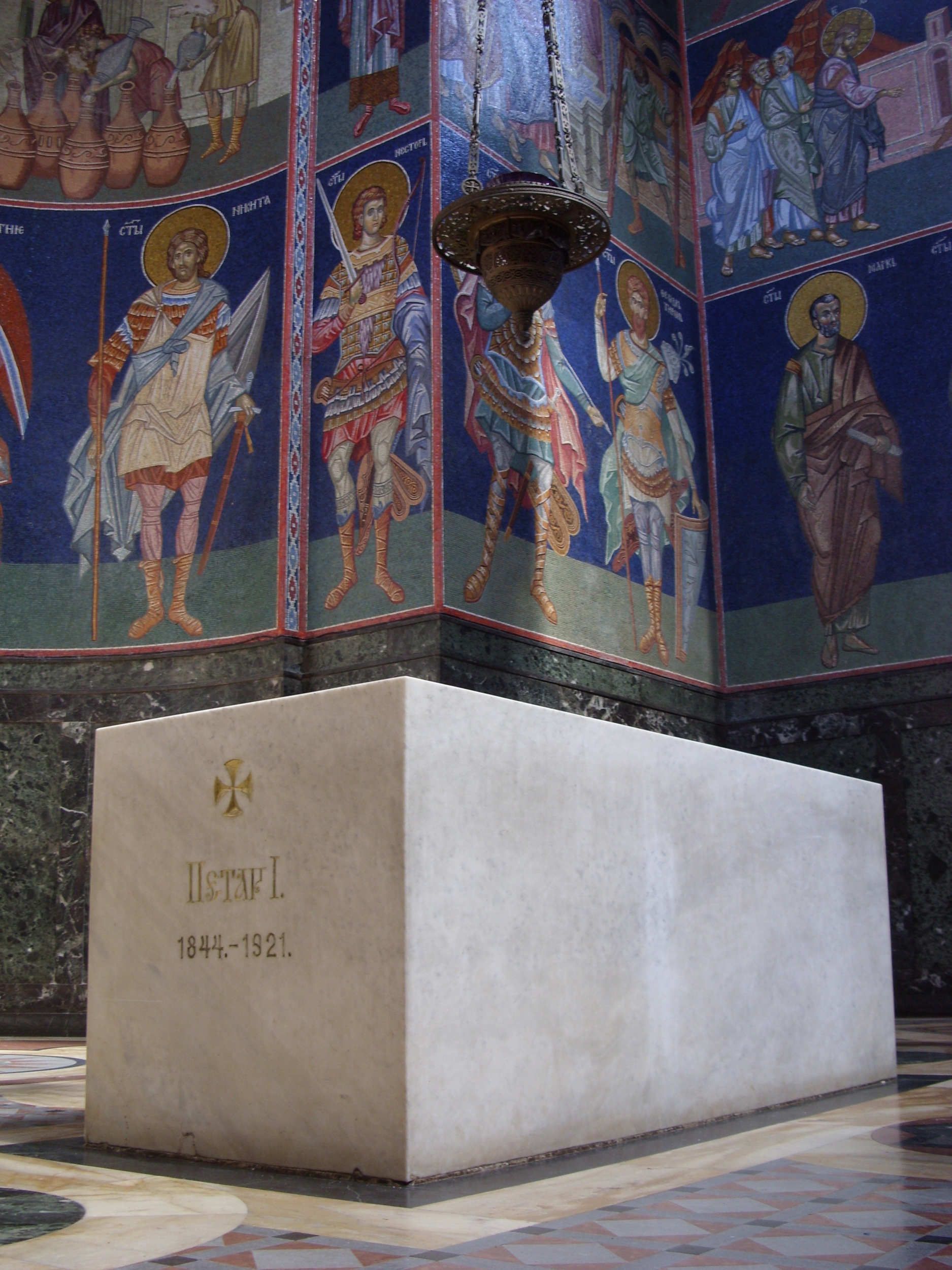
The ossuary of King Peter I of Serbia.

Peter I, upon his ascension to the throne in 1903, chose a spot 337 metres (1,106 feet) on the top of Mali Oplenac hill for the location of his St. George Church. The location was measured by geodesy experts; so the altar would face east according to Orthodox tradition. In 1907 the cornerstone was laid, and the Charter dedicated to St. George was placed in the foundation. The winning prize for the tender was given to architect Nikola Nestorović. After a long and animated expert discussion, primarily regarding the demand for the monumentality of the Serbian-Byzantine style, and due to the King's own displeasure with the proposed solution, another tender in 1909 was launched. The committee was made up with basically the same previous members (Mihailo Valtrović, Andra Stevanović, and architect Konstantin Jovanović, who replaced Dragutin Đorđević from the previous committee).

The committee awarded first prize to the young architect Kosta J. Jovanović. On May 1, 1910, construction started following Jovanović's plan. Stone breaking for the crypt and the foundation of the church lasted for four months. On 1 September 1910, the foundation was mostly completed. In 1911 the building process continued at a fast pace, and the church was already under the dome. It was decided that same year that the façade of the church would be made of white marble, which came from nearby Venčac mountain, even today known for its exceptionally white marble. In the autumn of 1912, the church was generally complete and ready for consecration. The Serbian Patriarch Dimitrije consecrated the church on 23 September 1912. During the pauses of the 1912-1913 Balkan Wars and the First World War, there was also a pause in the construction of the church. When Austria-Hungary occupied Serbia in the winter of 1915, the church was looted – the copper cover was removed from the dome, roof and portals. The lightning conductor was also removed as well as the bells. Many windows were broken including little marble pillars and ornaments. Using the excuse that important records might be hidden, the occupiers desecrated the graves in the crypt.

Returning to the liberated homeland and to the historical creation of the Kingdom of Serbs, Croats and Slovenes, Peter I was not able to see the completion of his foundation. The king died on 16 August 1921, and his successor Alexander I took over its completion. He modified the original plan.

After the reconstruction of the crypt, by Jovanović, this was followed by the iconostasis, the lightning conductor, then a new copper roof with golden edges on the dome. The bells were made by Frères Piccard from Annecy le Vieux, France and the mosaics were made by Puhl & Wagner from Berlin, Germany. The bronze chandelier was made by Luks, Zagreb, Croatia. The church was once again consecrated in September 1930. Church services were held until 1947. After that, it was declared a cultural monument and open to visitors. Oplenac was added to the list of Monuments of Culture of Exceptional Importance in 1979, and it is protected by the state.

== Architecture and design ==
The church is a five-domed structure. The interior length of the temple is 30 metres (98 feet), and the height of the arch is 27 metres (89 feet). The width of each narthex is 9 metres (30 feet), and so is the span of the central dome. All four façades are made of white marble, which comes from the Venčac Mountain. The main façade, the most decorative one, is the western one. The portal's semicircle hosts a mosaic icon of St. George, to whom the church is dedicated. Made in Venice according to the plan of the known Serbian artist Paja Jovanović, on the basis of a golden mosaic, this icon symbolizes the victory of the Serbs over its enemies. Above the portal, in a circle, the old Karađorđević Family coat of arms has been sculpted, on whose sides two typical men from Šumadija region are shown, holding the flags. The rest of it is mostly identical to the Coat of Arms of Serbia. The floor of the church was made in Munich, out of polished marble, in various colours. Lifted on a small podium, the throne for the King and Queen is made of polished green marble, its back is decorated with golden mosaic and mother-of-pearl, in the middle is the two-headed eagle. The arm-rest is made of the same marble as Visoki Dečani monastery, while the entire seat rests on sculpted lions. The huge chandelier, 9 metres in diameter, is underneath the main dome, hanging in 8 places, above the pendent. It has been molten out of massive bronze, and weighs 1,500 kg (3,300 lb). In the chandelier is a Crown set upside-down (symbolising the lost Serbian Empire in the Kosovo battle in 1389).

=== Mosaic ===
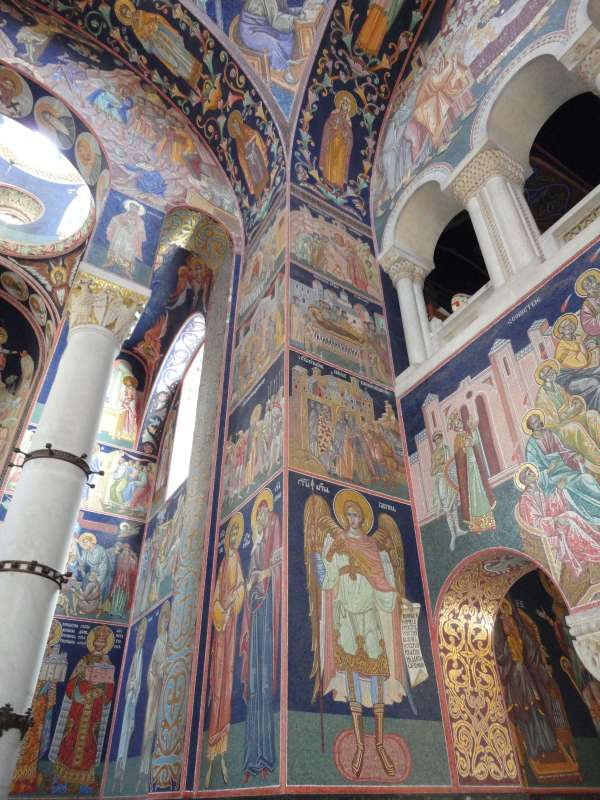
Mosaics in St George's Church.

The initial idea of King Peter I was to carve into the walls the names of all soldiers and officers who had perished in the Balkan Wars of 1912 and 1913. But, since the church was not fully completed, and since First World War followed (1914-1918), this idea had to be abandoned. The solution was to decorate the interior of the temple with mosaics, which would be a sort of a museum of reproductions of the most beautiful frescoes of the medieval Serbian art. Copies from 60 Serbian medieval churches and monasteries had been brought to the St. George church at Oplenac. The entire mosaic has 725 painted compositions (513 in the temple and 212 in the crypt), on which there are 1500 figures. The entire area of the mosaic is 3,500 square metres (38,000 sq ft); with 40 million various coloured pieces of glass which have 15 thousand different varieties of colour, making vivid artistic impression.

To the right side of the entrance, on the entire southern wall of the narthex, is the painting of the trustee, King Peter I, holding the model of his church on the palm of his left hand, wearing a crown and coronation ornaments. With his right hand, he is guided by St. George, to whom the temple is dedicated, and shown approaching the Mother of God, greeting him with Christ sitting on the throne.

In the southern apse is the gallery of the Serbian medieval rulers, an impressive line-up with every one of them represented by their respective churches. The first on the left is Stefan Nemanja (ruled from 1168 to 1196), wearing a priest garb of the Hilandar monastery, holding the Studenica monastery. Then, there is King Stefan the First Crowned (1196-1227) with the model of the Žiča monastery, then King Stefan Radoslav (1227–1234) with the narthex of Studenica monastery, followed by King Stefan Vladislav (1234–1243) with the Mileševa monastery, then King Stefan Uroš I (1243–1276) with the Sopoćani monastery; King Stefan Dragutin with the Church of St. Achillius (1276–1282), King Stefan Milutin (1282–1322) with the Gračanica monastery, King Stefan Dečanski (1322-1331) with the Visoki Dečani monastery, and two emperors – Stefan Dušan (1331-1355) with the Monastery of the Holy Archangels; and Stefan Uroš V (1355–1371) with the Matejić monastery. The next depicted ruler is Lazar of Serbia (1371-1389) with the Ravanica monastery, his son, despot Stefan Lazarević (1389–1427) with the Manasija monastery, followed by Đurađ Branković with the church of Smederevo.

In the very calotte of the main dome is the Pantocrator, copy of the thorax found in the Gračanica monastery. The face of Christ, 27 metres from the floor of the temple, looks impressive and is of proportional dimensions. Although the diameter of this painting is 9 metres (30 feet), and although just the finger of Christ is 1.5 metres (4.9 feet) long, and the nose is 1.2 metres (3.9 feet) long, everything is harmonious. In the altar are the frescoes of Lord's supper and the way to the Golgotha. In the altar niche there is the 5-metre (16-foot) tall figure of the Divine Mother of God in a praying position (copy of the fresco from the Patriarchal Monastery of Peć). Also, there is the Secret of the Holy Communion and the Communion of the Apostles with Bread and Wine. These are just some of the compositions that make the rich interior of the church.

Besides the Mausoleum (St. George church), there are other objects that encompass the Foundation of King Peter I – King Peter's House, King's villa, Queen's villa, Vineyards, Vineyard Keeper's House, etc. Visitors can also visit the historic town of Topola located nearby, a traditional stronghold of the Karađorđević family, ever since the time of Karađorđe.

=== Last supper ===
The church hosts an icon representing the Last supper, patterned after the famous Ultima cena by Da Vinci. The icon is made of mother of pearl and each figure and object is crafted individually. It was made in the workshop of the Salsa' family in Beit Sahour, 1.5 km (0.93 mi) east of Bethlehem. The icon is 73.5 by 67.5 cm (28.9 by 26.6 in). It was handed out to King Alexander I on 16 October 1924, when the Greek Orthodox Patriarch of Jerusalem, Damian I, visited Belgrade. Though the press of the day reported in detail about the event, the icon wasn't mentioned. It was a gift for the king's wedding, which happened on 8 June 1922. The king ordered for the icon to be transferred to the church vault in Oplenac.

On 18 October 1934, German Nazi official Hermann Göring visited Oplenac, while attending the funeral of King Alexander I. He spent a lot of time in front of the icon. As the myths of John the Apostle on Ultima cena actually being Mary Magdalene already existed, and John on the icon indeed looks like a woman, Heinrich Himmler's quasi-scientific organization Ahnenerbe also expressed interest in the icon as part of their search for the Holy Grail. After the German Invasion of Yugoslavia during World War II, Yugoslavia was occupied in April 1941, and Göring decided to obtain the icon first. In order to forestall the plundering of the Ahnenerbe and Alfred Rosenberg, who also founded an organization for stealing arts in the occupied countries, Göring sent Franz Neuhausen to Serbia. In order to mask the looting and give it some legal credence, Göring appointed Neuhausen as the special plenipotentiary for economic affairs in the Territory of the Military Commander in Serbia after the partition of Yugoslavia. The first thing taken from Opleanac was the icon, sent right away to Göring who exhibited it at his Carinhall estate. In 1943, Göring transferred a part of the plundered collection, including the icon, to the Altaussee salt mines in Styria, Austria.

The Allies found the treasure after the liberation and it was all stored in Führerbau, a former representative building built for Hitler, then turned by the Allies into the Central Collecting Place for the art looted by Nazis. The icon was also stored there. There are two version of how the icon was returned to Oplenac. According to the first, member of the security agency OZNA Slobodan Kostić Uča paid for it "1,200 dinars, 350 dollars and some small types of other favors". The other, more accepted is that controversial art collector Ante Topić Mimara returned the icon, as his wife Wiltrud Mersman Topić was a junior curator at the Central Collecting Place.

== See also ==
- Tourism in Serbia
