= Princess Olga of Greece and Denmark =

Princess Paul of Yugoslavia (1903–1997)

Princess Olga
- Princess Paul of Yugoslavia
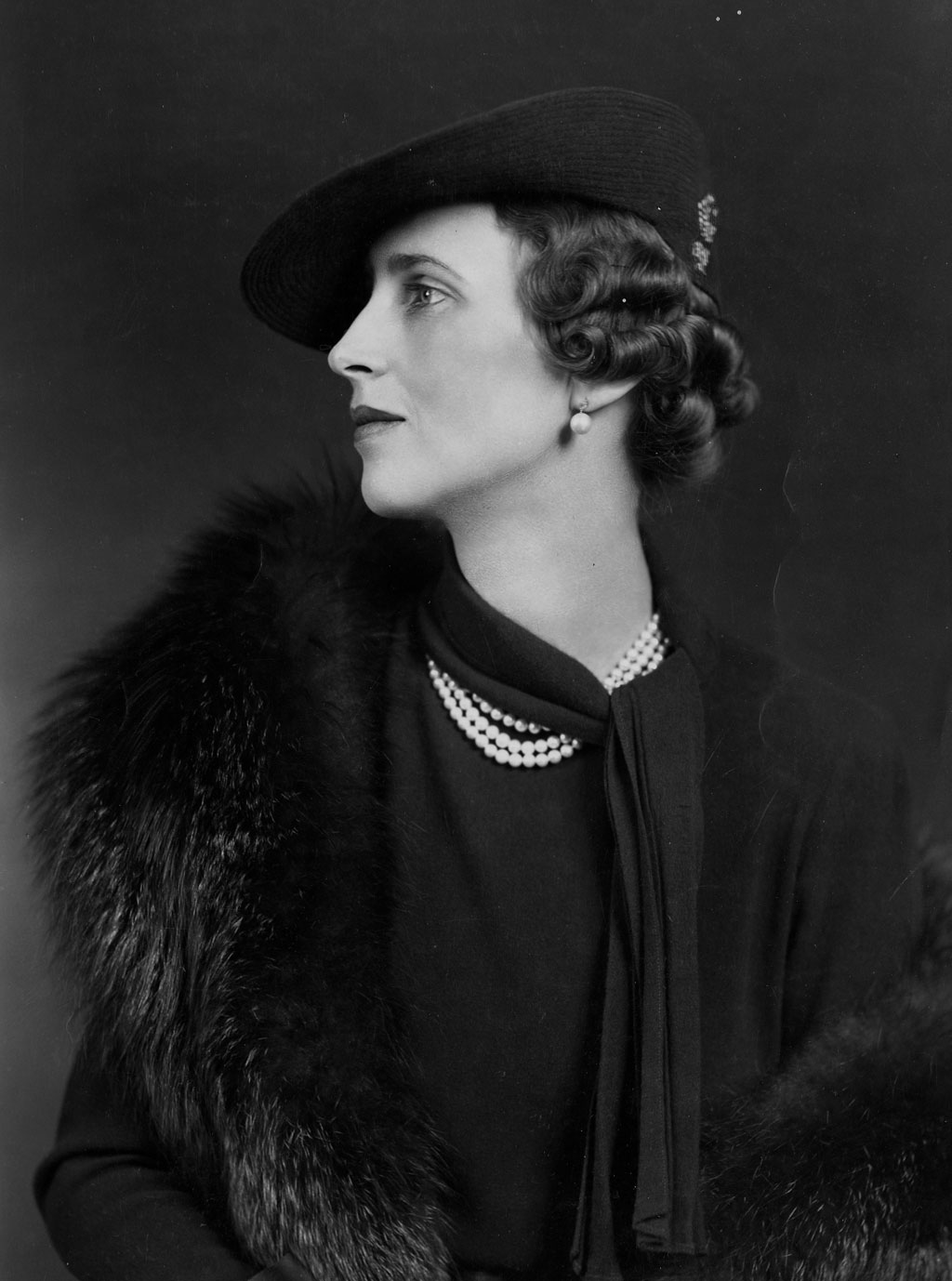
- Princess Olga in 1939
- Born: 11 June 1903; Tatoi Palace, Tatoi, Greece
- Died: 16 October 1997 (aged 94); Paris, France
- Burial: 23 October 1997 Bois-de-Vaux Cemetery, Lausanne, Switzerland 4 October 2012 (reinterred) St. George's Church, Oplenac, Serbia
- Spouse: Prince Paul of Yugoslavia (m. 1923; died 1976)
- Issue: Prince Alexander; Prince Nikola; Princess Elizabeth
- House: Glücksburg
- Father: Prince Nicholas of Greece and Denmark
- Mother: Grand Duchess Elena Vladimirovna of Russia

Princess Olga of Greece and Denmark (Greek: Όλγα; 11 June 1903 – 16 October 1997) was a Greek and Danish princess who married Prince Paul, Regent of the Kingdom of Yugoslavia. After her marriage, she was known as Princess Paul of Yugoslavia.

Princess Olga was a daughter of Prince Nicholas of Greece and Denmark and Grand Duchess Elena Vladimirovna of Russia, and a granddaughter of King George I of Greece. After a brief engagement in 1922 to Crown Prince Frederik of Denmark, she married Prince Paul of Yugoslavia in 1923. In 1934, after the assassination of King Alexander I, Prince Paul was appointed regent of Yugoslavia on behalf of King Peter II, and Princess Olga became the senior lady of the court and acted as first lady of Yugoslavia, working side by side with her husband on representation duties. In 1941, during the Second World War, Prince Paul was forcibly removed from power after signing the Tripartite Pact, which took Yugoslavia into the Axis with Germany and Italy. Paul, Olga, and their three children were arrested and given as prisoners to the British. They spent the rest of the war in house arrest and exile in Egypt, Kenya and South Africa, and were not allowed to return to Europe until 1948. The couple and their children eventually settled in Paris, France, where Paul died in 1976. Having become a widow, Olga spent more and more time in the United Kingdom, the adopted country of her sister, Marina. Struck by Alzheimer's disease at the end of her life, Olga died in Paris in 1997. Her remains were buried at the Bois-de-Vaux Cemetery, Lausanne, Switzerland, before being transferred to the royal mausoleum of Oplenac, in Serbia, in 2012.

== Biography ==
=== Early life ===
==== Childhood ====
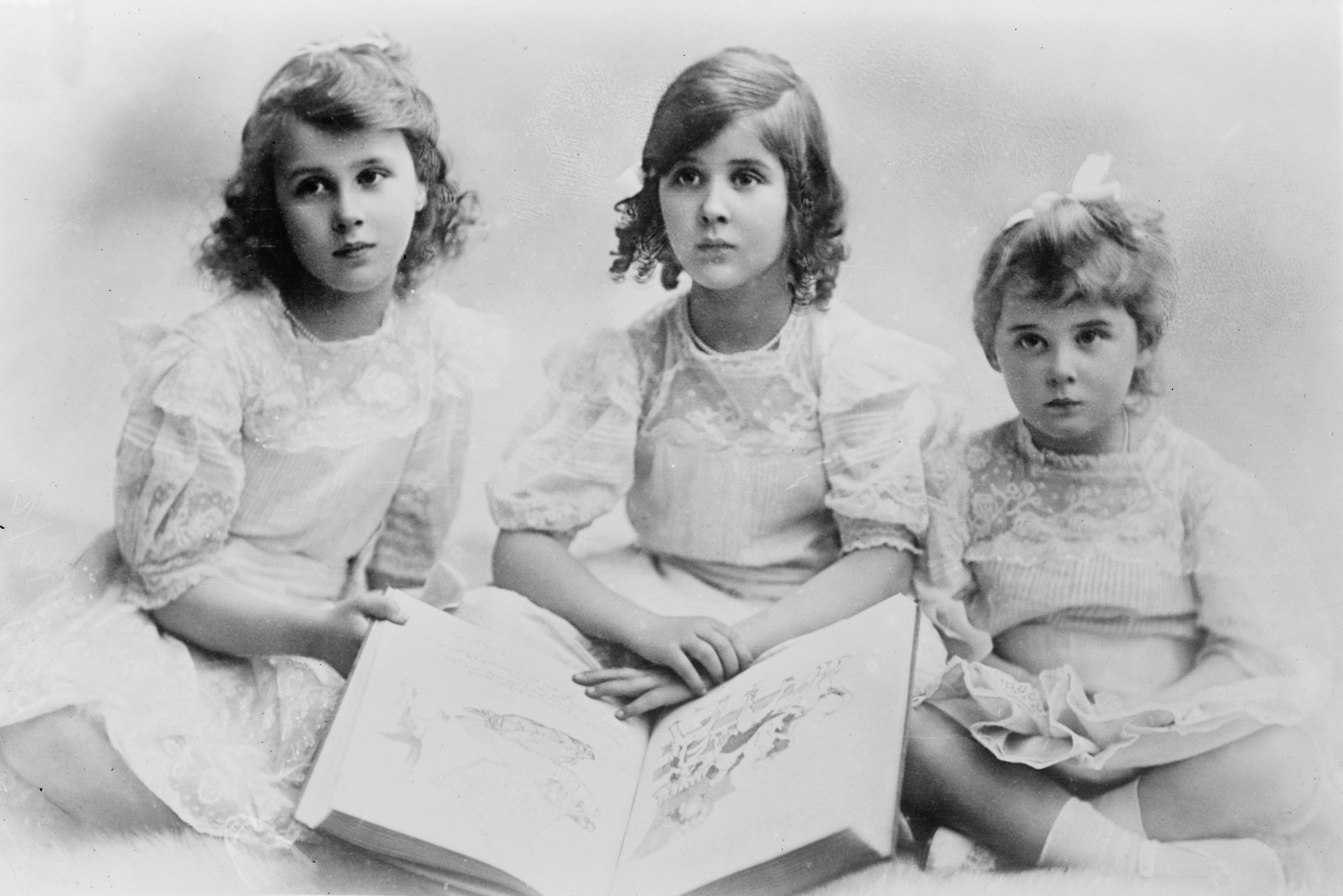
Princess Olga, left, with her sisters Princess Elizabeth, centre, and Princess Marina, right; 1912

A granddaughter of King George I of Greece, Princess Olga was born at Tatoi Palace, the second home of the Greek royal family, in 1903 to Prince Nicholas of Greece and Denmark (1872–1938) and his wife Grand Duchess Elena Vladimirovna of Russia (1882–1957). As was the Greek tradition, she was then named after her paternal grandmother, Queen Olga.

She grew up alongside her parents and younger sisters, Princesses Elizabeth (1904–1955) and Marina (1906–1968), at the Nicholas Palace, the current seat of the Italian Embassy in Athens. (Note: The Nicholas Palace was offered by Tsar Nicholas II of Russia to his cousin the Grand Duchess Elena Vladimirovna of Russia, on the occasion of her marriage to Prince Nicholas of Greece and Denmark, in 1902. Very modern for its time, it provided running water, both cold and hot (Mateos Sainz de Medrano 2004, p. 250).) Olga was brought up in relative simplicity and her early education was overseen by an English Norland nurse by the name of Miss Fox.

Once a year, Olga and her family travelled to Russia, where they were regularly received by their Romanov cousins. The princess and her sisters thus had the opportunity to play with the daughters of Tsar Nicholas II, who were roughly the same age as them. They were also in Saint Petersburg, when the First World War broke out in 1914.

==== World War I and exile ====
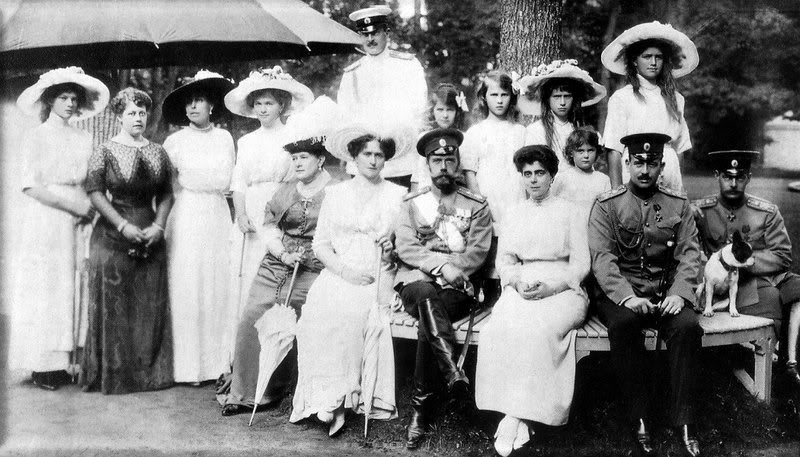
Family reunion in Russia. In this photo, taken during a stay in Greece with the Romanovs, Princess Olga is the third little girl, above, from the right.

The First World War marked a difficult period for the Greek royal family. After the fallout between King Constantine I and his prime minister Eleftherios Venizelos over whether Greece should enter the conflict, a virtual civil war shook the Hellenic kingdom, which was partially occupied by the Allies from 1915.

Finally, on 10 June 1917, King Constantine was forced to leave power by the ultimatum of the French High Commissioner Charles Jonnart and he went into exile with his wife and children in German-speaking Switzerland. (Note: Only his second son remained in Greece, where he ascended the throne under the name of Alexander I.) Described as the "evil genius behind the monarchy" by the Venizelists, Prince Nicolas was quickly forced to leave Athens in turn and join his brother abroad. Olga and her family then settled in St. Moritz, when Greece fell into a financial crisis for the first time during her lifetime.

The restoration of Constantine I in 1920 allowed Olga to return to her native country for a brief period, but the king's final abdication in 1922 forced the young princess and her relatives to resume their life in exile. The princess then settled successively in Sanremo, Paris and London, where she lived with members of her family.

==== Broken engagement ====
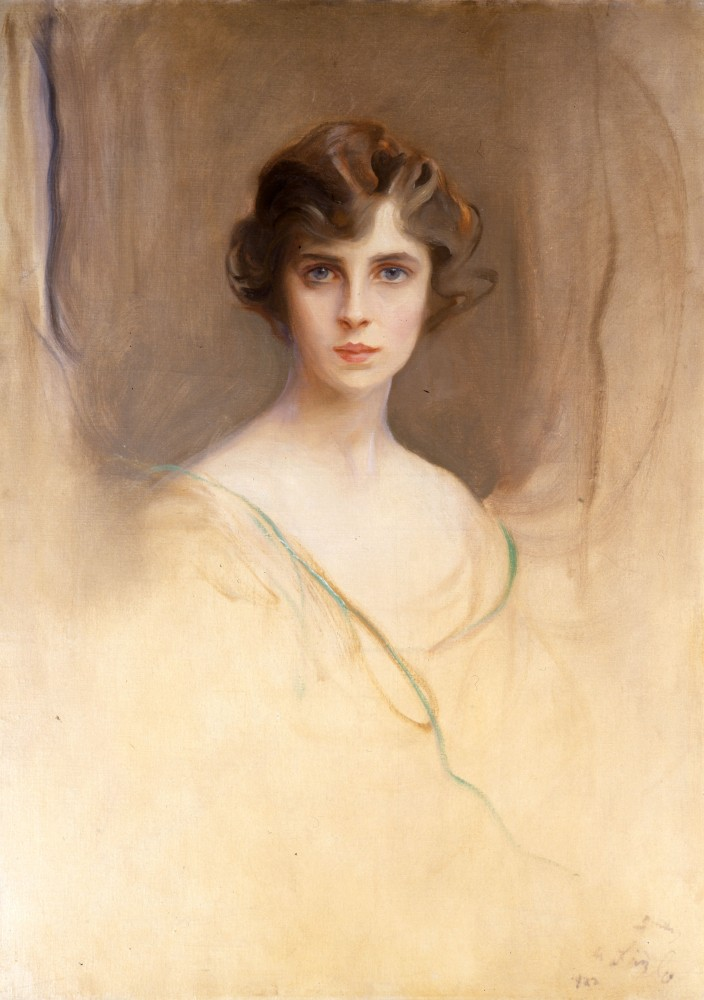
1922 portrait by Philip de László

Considered, along with her sister Marina, to be "one of the most beautiful young women of her time", Princess Olga had, according to biographer Ricardo Mateos Sainz de Medrano, a "discreet, romantic and fragile personality".

Prior to her departure into exile, she was linked to the future Frederik IX of Denmark and the engagement of the pair was announced publicly in 1922. However, the awkwardness of the Danish prince, who held the hand of one of Olga's sisters instead of hers during the official presentation of the young couple to the Athenian crowd, lastingly humiliated the future bride. Shortly after the event, Olga decided to return her ring to the heir to the Danish throne and called off their engagement.

After moving to the UK, Olga's love life was the subject of much speculation. Public rumors and claims circulated about her romantic relationships and she was linked to the Prince of Wales (later Edward VIII) for some time. Neither Edward nor Olga confirmed the rumors. A frequent guest of the British upper class, the Greek princess met Prince Paul of Yugoslavia, a grandson of Alexander Karađorđević, Prince of Serbia, at a ball given by her cousin Lady Zia Wernher.

Immediately impressed by the beauty of Olga, Paul sought to win the favor of the princess, but she was rather indifferent to him. However, other encounters followed, notably at Buckingham Palace, and Prince Paul finally managed to catch her attention.

=== In Yugoslavia ===
==== Marriage and settlement in Yugoslavia ====
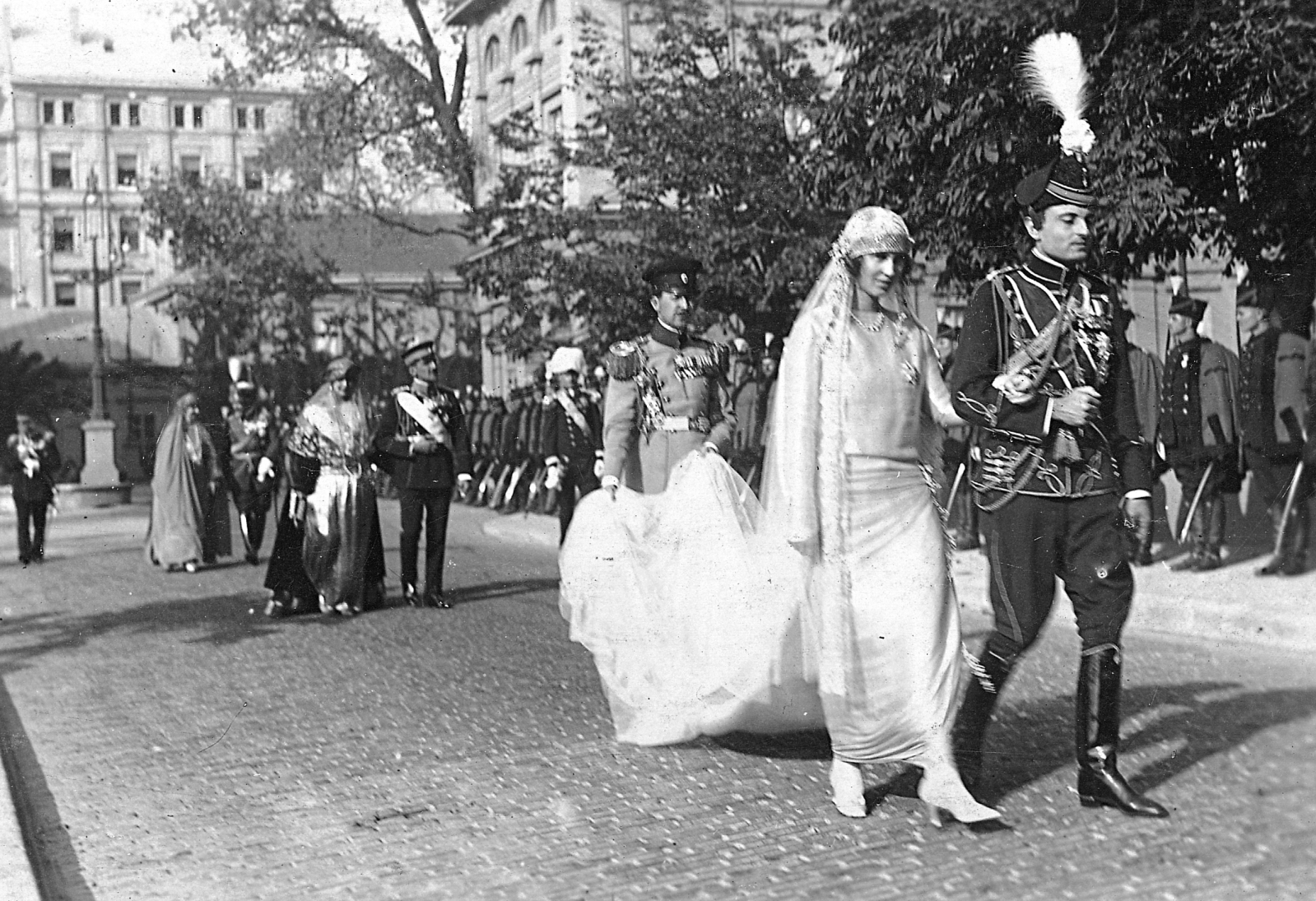
Princess Olga and Prince Paul in Belgrade on their wedding day in 1923

Once Olga and Paul's engagement was announced on 26 July 1923, the young princess' trousseau was purchased and prepared in Paris. However, it was in Belgrade, in the prince's homeland, that the wedding was organized the following October.

Now Princess of Yugoslavia, Olga began learning Serbo-Croatian, which she quickly mastered though with a heavy Greek accent. Dividing her life between the White Palace in Belgrade, a magnificent chalet in the Bohinj valley and a villa on Rumunska Ulica (now Užička Ulica), Olga benefited from the fortune that her husband partly inherited from his maternal family. However, accustomed to a less provincial lifestyle, the princess found her daily life more monotonous and boring. Her relationship with King Alexander I of Yugoslavia and his wife were not warm.

Olga, however, received regular visits from her sisters and other family members. She gave birth to three children between 1924 and 1936, Prince Alexander (1924–2016), Prince Nikola (1928–1954), and Princess Elizabeth (born 1936), and spent a lot of time caring for them while her husband devoted himself to his art collections.

==== Regency of Paul ====
On 9 October 1934 King Alexander I of Yugoslavia was assassinated during an official visit to Marseille by a Macedonian nationalist member of IMRO. His successor, the young Peter II was eleven years old, and a Council of Regency was set up under the leadership of Prince Paul. Although she had never aspired to a political life, Olga's husband had no choice but to accept the responsibility that fell to him and took control of state affairs.

Having become in essence the "first lady" of Yugoslavia, (Note: The real "first lady" was technically Queen Mother Maria, but she no longer participated in any political events, unlike Olga, who was supposed to assist her husband in Yugoslavia as well as abroad.) Olga had to more than ever represent her country alongside her husband. With him, she made several official stays abroad and notably met the dictators Benito Mussolini and Adolf Hitler in Rome and Berlin in April and June 1939, respectively. In the tense context of the late 1930s, the strongly-Anglophile Prince Paul gradually committed his country to a policy of alliance with the Axis powers. It would seem, moreover, that the family ties between Olga and various members of the German upper class who embraced the Nazi ideology (including her cousin, Prince Philip of Hesse) had an effect on the political development of Prince Paul.

In 1938, Olga left Yugoslavia for a long time to look after several elderly relatives. She stayed in Athens to witness the final days of her father, Prince Nicolas, and to take care of her mother, the Grand Duchess Elena Vladimirovna. A few months later, the princess travelled to Paris, where she reunited with her father-in-law, Prince Arsen of Yugoslavia, who died shortly afterward.

=== Second World War ===
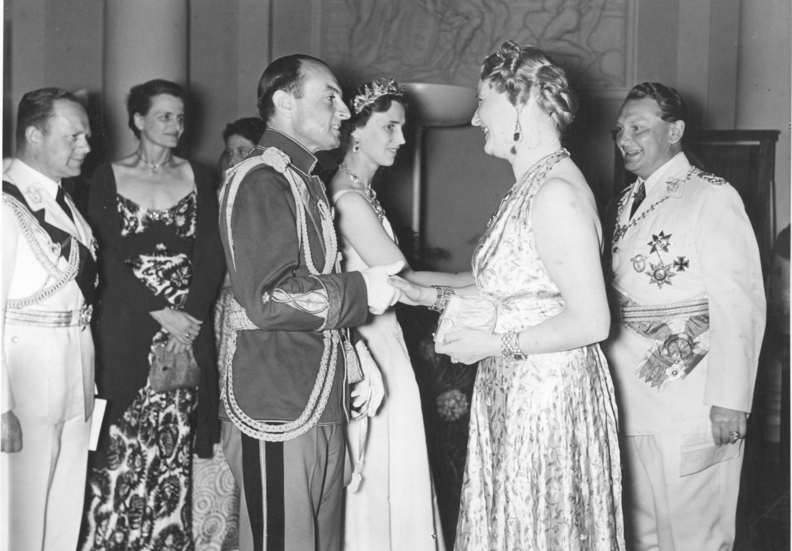
Paul and Olga (left) meeting Emmy and Hermann Göring (right), 1939

After the outbreak of the Second World War, Prince Paul signed a treaty of alliance on 25 March 1941 and brought his country into the Axis camp. Opposing that decision, the Yugoslav army revolted two days later and proclaimed the majority of young Peter II to assume full power. Paul, Olga and their three children were then arrested and handed over to the British, who deported them to Greece (where they were welcomed by King George II) then to Egypt (under the pretext of intrigue). At the same time, the overthrow of the Yugoslav regency led Hitler to bomb Belgrade and invade the country in April 1941.

Olga and her family were next sent to Kenya, where they arrived after three days of travel, on 28 April 1941. Settled far from Nairobi, in Oserian, in the region of Lake Naivasha, they took up residence in the country house of the late Lord Erroll, where they would be watched by the former governor of the colony. Condemned to inactivity, Olga therefore devoted her days to maintaining the residence, learning to cook and supervising the education of her children, while her husband sank into melancholy and depression. Relatively isolated, the couple nevertheless befriended the families of settlers who resided in the region. In September 1941, they were allowed to move to Preston's house, a more modern house located in the same region.

In September 1942, the death of Prince George, Duke of Kent, in an air crash left his wife, Princess Marina, inconsolable and the British government had to allow Olga to stay in the United Kingdom to keep her sister's company. Olga took advantage of her stay in Britain to plead her husband's cause to the government but without much success. Back in Kenya in January 1943, the princess found her husband severely affected by depression. As Paul's condition did not improve, the British government finally allowed Olga's family to settle in South Africa in June 1943. There they found several members of the Greek royal family (Note: They were Princess Frederica and her children (Constantine and Sophia), Prince George of Greece and Denmark and his wife Marie Bonaparte, Princess Eugénie of Greece and Denmark and her family and finally Princess Katherine of Greece and Denmark.) exiled in the dominion after the invasion of their country by the Axis forces. Above all, they ceased to be treated as prisoners, even though they did not officially regain their freedom until 1 June 1946.

Olga and her family were finally allowed to return to Europe in 1948.

=== Later life ===
==== Return to Europe ====
In 1948, Paul, Olga and their three children were finally granted permission to leave South Africa, but Yugoslavia had adopted a communist regime in 1945 and they could not return to their country. The family first settled in Switzerland, then in Paris. Olga also made frequent trips to London and Florence, where Paul owned Villa di Pratolino located not far from thumb|upright=1.2|Villa Sparta. In Tuscany, Olga had the pleasure of reuniting with her cousin and friend Helen, Queen Mother of Romania, while in the United Kingdom she was always welcomed by her sister Marina, Duchess of Kent, and the rest of the British royal family.

In 1954, Olga and Paul's second son, Nikola, was killed in a car accident in England. In 1957, Olga's mother Elena Vladimirovna died in Athens, Greece.

==== Final years ====
Widowed in 1976, Olga stayed for longer periods in Great Britain. With her sister Marina's death in 1968, she was accommodated at Kensington Palace, with Princess Alice, Countess of Athlone, and after the latter's death, directly at Clarence House with Queen Elizabeth The Queen Mother. The Greek princess then acquired the reputation of being a demanding guest.

As she aged, Olga's health began to deteriorate. However, she continued to attend the great events of European royalty, such as the weddings of Crown Prince Alexander of Yugoslavia in 1972, her nephew Prince Michael of Kent in 1978, and Prince Charles and Lady Diana Spencer in 1981. At the wedding of the Yugoslav pretender, it was also Princess Olga who accompanied him to the altar, as the prince's mother and grandmother were not able to attend the ceremony due to health issues.

==== Illness and death ====
Affected by Alzheimer's disease at the end of her life, Princess Olga was hospitalized for a long time in Meudon. A few years before her death, in 1993, her daughter Elizabeth decided to make a documentary film about her with the help of a Serbian journalist Mira Adanja Polak. However, with Olga being heavily affected by the disease, the project of her daughter caused a scandal. Prince Alexander brought a complaint against his sister Elizabeth before the French courts for damage to the image of their mother and claimed, in her name, $107,000 in damages.

Princess Olga died in Paris on 16 October 1997. She was buried alongside her husband in the Bois-de-Vaux Cemetery, in Lausanne, Switzerland.

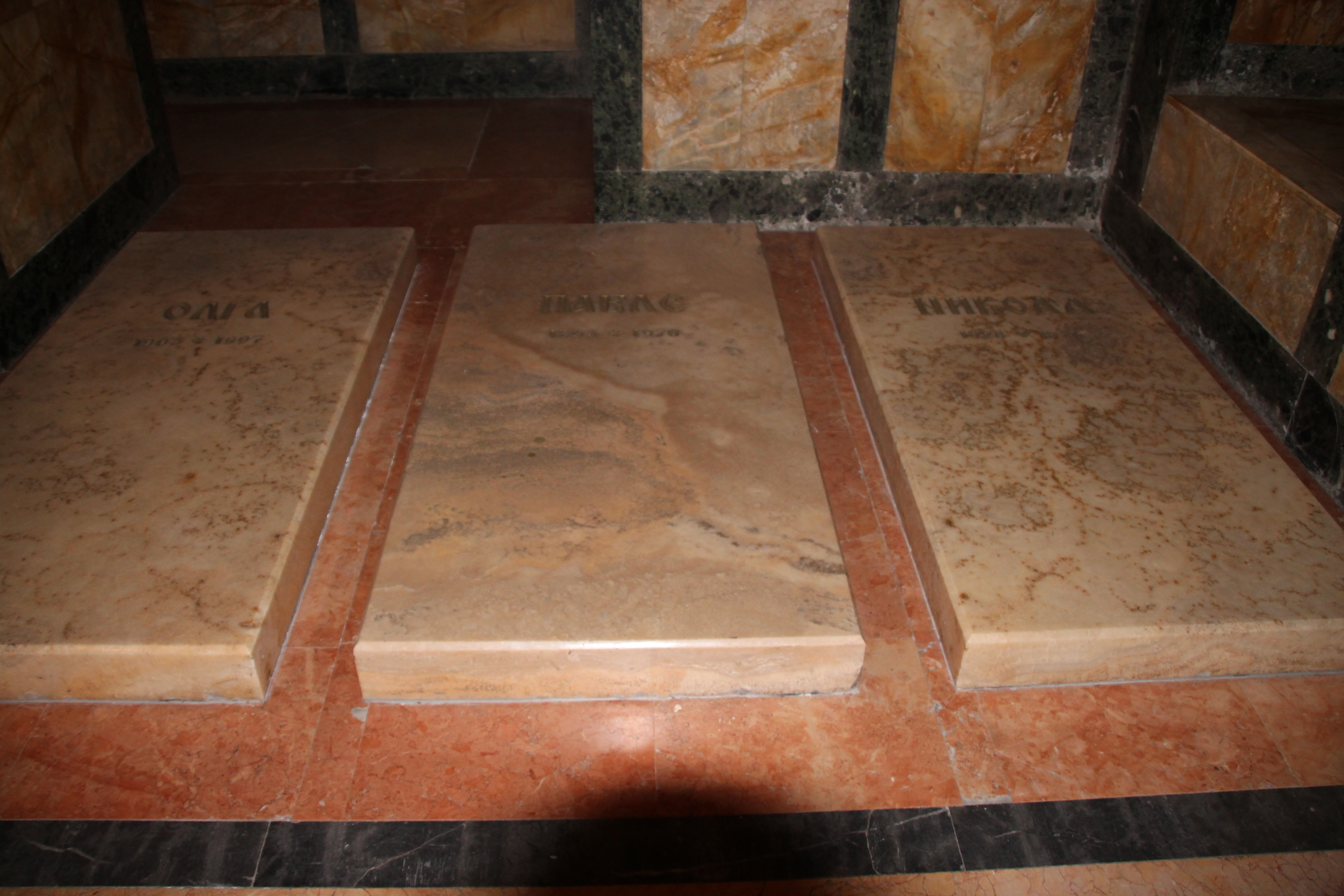
Tombs of Princess Olga, Prince Paul and Prince Nikola in the Karađorđević family vault at St. George's Church in Oplenac

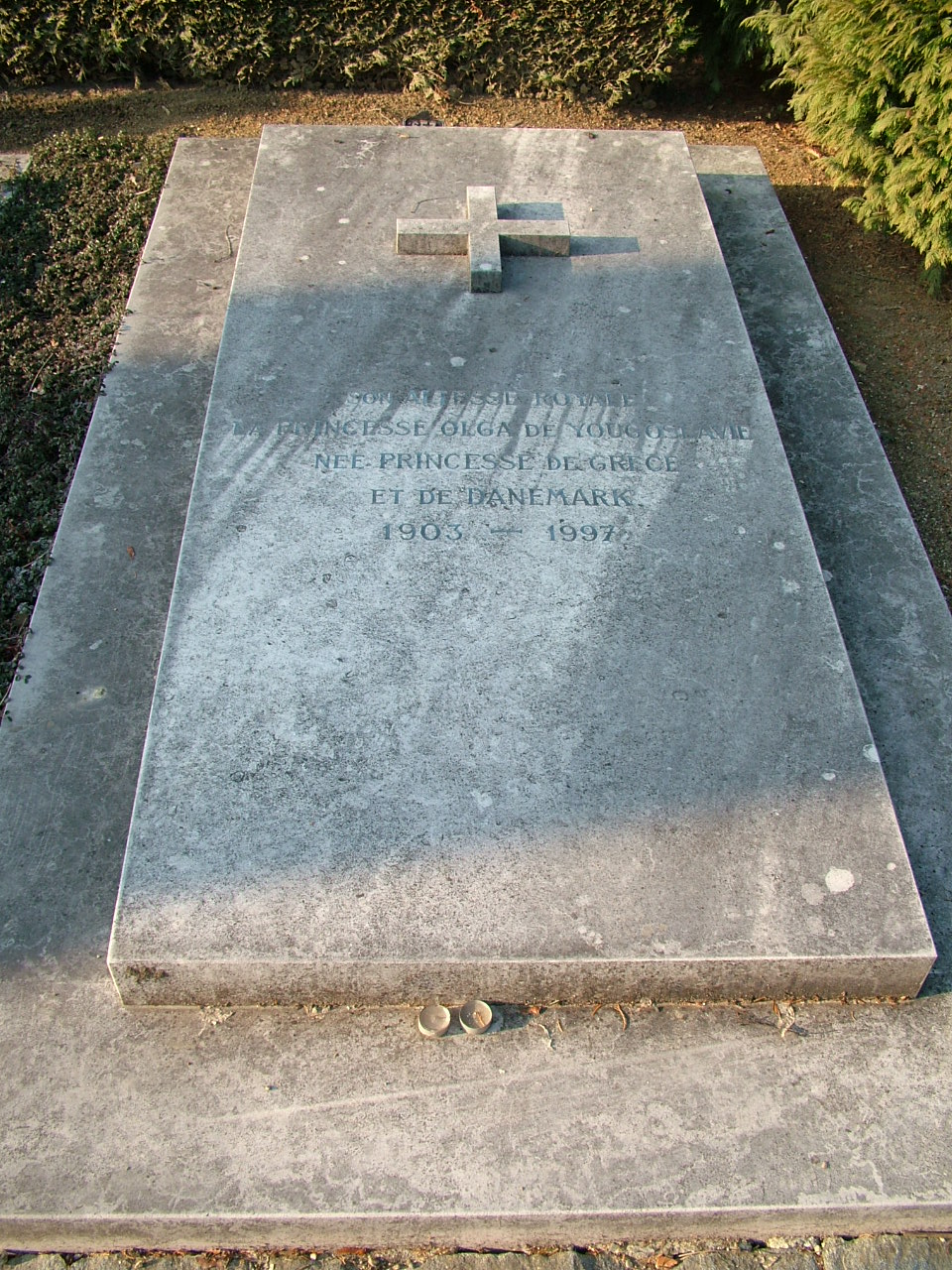
Former grave (1997–2012) of Princess Olga in Lausanne

On 28 September 2012, the remains of Princess Olga, her husband and their son Nikola were exhumed and then transported to Belgrade, Serbia. On 4 October, an official ceremony was held at St. Michael's Cathedral in Belgrade by Irinej, Serbian Patriarch. The children and grandchildren of the couple, as well as Crown Prince Alexander and his wife Princess Katherine, and Serbian President Tomislav Nikolić and his government participated in the event. Their remains were reburied in the Karađorđević family mausoleum of Oplenac in Topola.

== Bibliography ==
=== Biographies of the princess ===
- Iskasen, Trond Norén (2010). ""A Broken Engagement" – Frederik of Denmark and Olga of Greece". Royalty Digest Quarterly (3).
- Prentice, Robert (2011). "Olga of Greece and Yugoslavia". Royalty Digest Quarterly (3).

=== About the princess and her family ===
- Balfour, Neil; Mackay, Sally (1980). Paul of Yugoslavia: Britain's maligned friend. H. Hamilton. ISBN 978-0-2411-0392-0.
- Mateos Sainz de Medrano, Ricardo (2004). La Familia de la Reina Sofía: La Dinastía griega, la Casa de Hannover y los reales primos de Europa (in Spanish). Madrid: La Esfera de los Libros. ISBN 978-84-9734-195-0. OCLC 55595158.
- Palmer, Alan; Greece, Michael of (1990). The Royal House of Greece. London: Weidenfeld Nicolson Illustrated. ISBN 978-0-297-83060-3. OCLC 59773890.
- Petropoulos, Jonathan (2009). Royals and the Reich: The Princes von Hessen in Nazi Germany. Oxford: Oxford University Press. ISBN 978-0-19-921278-1.
- Van der Kiste, John (1994). Kings of the Hellenes: The Greek Kings, 1863–1974. Sutton Publishing. ISBN 9780750921473. OCLC 41157782.

=== Memoirs by family members ===
- Greece, Prince Nicholas of (1926). My Fifty Years. London: Hutchinson & Co.
- Greece, Prince Nicholas of (1928). Political Memoirs. London: Hutchinson & Co.
- King Peter II of Yugoslavia (1955). A King's Heritage: The Memoirs of King Peter II of Yugoslavia. London, England: Cassell.
