= Princess Elizabeth of Yugoslavia =

Serbian princess and politician

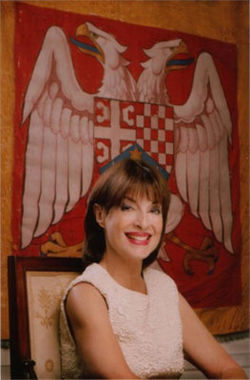
- Portrait of Princess Elizabeth of Yugoslavia
- Born: Jelisaveta Karađorđević; 7 April 1936 (age 90); White Palace, Belgrade, Kingdom of Yugoslavia
- Spouse: Howard Oxenberg (m. 1960; div. 1966) Neil Balfour (m. 1969; div. 1978) Manuel Ulloa Elías (m. 1987; died 1992)
- Issue: Catherine Oxenberg; Christina Oxenberg; Nicholas Augustus Balfour
Names
- English: Elizabeth Karageorgevich; Serbian: Јелисавета Карађорђевић (Jelisaveta Karađorđević)
- House: Karađorđević
- Father: Paul, Prince Regent of Yugoslavia
- Mother: Princess Olga of Greece and Denmark
- Website: Official website

Styles of Princess Elizabeth of Yugoslavia
- Reference style: Her Royal Highness
- Spoken style: Your Royal Highness

Princess Elizabeth of Yugoslavia (Serbian: Jelisaveta Karađorđević, Јелисавета Карађорђевић; born 7 April 1936 in Belgrade) is a human rights activist and former presidential candidate for Serbia, and a member of the extended House of Karađorđević, the former royal family of the defunct Kingdom of Yugoslavia. Yugoslavia abolished its monarchy in 1945 and decades later broke up into several countries.

== Early life ==
Princess Elizabeth was born in the White Palace, Belgrade as the third child and the only daughter of Prince Paul of Yugoslavia (prince regent of Yugoslavia 1934–1941) and Princess Olga of Greece and Denmark. Her older brothers were Prince Nicholas and Prince Alexander of Yugoslavia, who married, firstly, Princess Maria Pia of Savoy and, secondly, Princess Barbara of Liechtenstein. She is a paternal second cousin of Queen Sofía of Spain and King Charles III, and a maternal first cousin of Prince Edward, Duke of Kent and his siblings, Prince Michael of Kent and Princess Alexandra, The Honourable Lady Ogilvy. She is a maternal third cousin of king Willem-Alexander of the Netherlands. Elizabeth is also a great-great-granddaughter of Karađorđe, who started the first Serbian uprising against the Turks in 1804.

Her godmother and namesake was her maternal aunt, Princess Elizabeth of Greece and Denmark.

Elizabeth was educated in Kenya, South Africa, United Kingdom, Switzerland, and Paris, where she studied the history of fine art. She speaks English, French, Spanish, Italian and Serbian.

Together with her brother Alexander, she took part in the ship tour organized by Queen Frederica and her husband King Paul of Greece in 1954, which became known as the “Cruise of the Kings” and was attended by over 100 royals from all over Europe. On this trip, Alexander met his first wife, Maria Pia of Savoy, a daughter of Umberto II of Italy and Marie-José of Belgium, while Elizabeth fell in love for the first time with her cousin, Prince Karl of Hesse.

Later, she developed a passion for a Russian nobleman, Prince Michel Obolensky (1926–1995), youngest brother of a family friend, Princess Irina Obolensky, but she was prevented from pursuing the relationship as her parents had another suitor in mind, Baudouin of Belgium.

== Marriages and children ==
On 21 January 1960, Princess Elizabeth married firstly Howard Oxenberg (1919–2010), an American Jewish dress manufacturer and close friend of the Kennedy family. They were divorced in 1966. They have two daughters (and three granddaughters):

- Catherine Oxenberg (b. 22 September 1961) briefly married Robert Evans in July 1998 and had the marriage annulled nine days later. She married Casper Van Dien on 8 May 1999. They had two daughters and divorced in 2015. She also has a daughter, born in 1991, from a previous relationship.
  - India Riven Oxenberg (b. 7 June 1991)
  - Maya Van Dien (b. 20 Sep 2001)
  - Celeste Alma Van Dien (b. 3 Oct 2003)
- Christina Oxenberg (b. 27 December 1962) married Damian Elwes in May 1986. They later divorced.

Princess Elizabeth's second marriage was to Neil Balfour of Dawyck (born 1944) on 23 September 1969. He was the grandson of Alexander Balfour, founder of the Liverpool shipping company Balfour Williamson. They divorced in November 1978. They have one son (and four granddaughters):

- Nicholas Augustus Roxburgh Balfour (b. 6 June 1970) married Jonkvrouw Stéphanie de Brouwer (born 1971) in 2000. They have four daughters:
  - India Lily Balfour (b. 17 October 2002)
  - Gloria Elizabeth Balfour (b. 11 November 2005)
  - Olympia Rose Balfour (b. 27 June 2007)
  - Georgia Veronika Stefania Balfour (b. 10 September 2010)

In 1974, she was briefly engaged to actor Richard Burton after his first divorce from Elizabeth Taylor.

Princess Elizabeth was married a third time, to former Prime Minister of Peru Manuel Ulloa Elías (1922–1992) on 28 February 1987. They separated in 1989, although the marriage was never officially dissolved. In 1992 Ulloa Elías died, which made the princess officially a widow.

== Career ==
A businesswoman and writer, Elizabeth is the author of four storybooks for children and has created two perfumes- "Jelisaveta" and "E".

Elizabeth recognized early the warning signs of what would eventually be known as Balkanization in Yugoslavia. She spoke out in Europe and America on behalf of bridging the gap between ethnic hatreds. Working behind the scenes through United Nations programs, she also journeyed to the Vatican in 1989 to ask Monsignor Tauran, then Holy See Secretary for Relations with States, to help improve relations between Catholic and Orthodox communities in Yugoslavia.

In December 1990, she created the Princess Elizabeth Foundation, a non-political, not-for-profit organization after foreseeing the crucial importance of a vehicle to address the tension brewing just below the surface. Since the subsequent civil wars, her efforts have focused heavily on transporting medical supplies, food, clothing and blankets to refugee camps, in addition to finding homes for children victimized by war and placing older students in schools and colleges in America.

Before the breakup of Yugoslavia began in 1991, she invited the Orthodox Bishop Sava and the Mufti of Belgrade, along with the Yugoslav Minister for Religious Affairs to attend a conference in Moscow that was hosted by Mikhail Gorbachev. This was the second international gathering of political and religious leaders committed to world reform that included Mother Teresa, the Archbishop of Canterbury, the Dalai Lama, Al Gore and Carl Sagan:

I do not understand how people can feel superior to those of another faith or race. Such intolerance is deeply rooted in fear, which helps to perpetuate injustice and hatred. This deep programming prevents people from honouring and celebrating life's differences.

In 2002, Princess Elizabeth received the first Nuclear Disarmament Forum Award, the Demiurgus Peace International (accompanying president Vladimir Putin, Archbishop Desmond Tutu, Ted Turner and others), for outstanding achievements in the field of strengthening peace among nations in Zug, Switzerland.

She decided to run for President of Serbia in the 2004 Serbian presidential election, despite her cousin Alexander's having objected that the Royal Family should stay out of politics. After the end of World War II, the Royal Family was banished from the country, and their goods confiscated. "In case of victory," she stated, "my priority would not be to return to a monarchy, but to form a real State." She got 63,991 votes or 2.1%, finishing in 6th place out of fifteen candidates.

== Royal property ==
After the death of King Alexander I, and during the Regency administration (of Regent Prince Paul, Radenko Stanković, and Ivo Perović) that followed, the City of Belgrade District Court issued Decree N° 0.428/34 on 27 October 1938. The decree, which became official law on 4 March 1939, pronounced King Alexander I's underage sons Crown Prince Peter, Prince Tomislav, and Prince Andrew, in equal parts, heirs to his entire estate. This included all real estate at Dedinje: the Royal Palace (Old Palace) in Belgrade, its surrounding land and forest, and the White Palace, with its appertaining houses. On 2 August 1947, Edvard Kardelj, then vice-president of the Socialist Federal Republic of Yugoslavia, issued a decree that confiscated all these properties from the Karadjordjević family. This followed an earlier decree in March 1947, which stripped members of the family of their citizenship.

The decree by the National Assembly of the Presidency of the People's Federal Republic of Yugoslavia was abolished in 2001, after the deposing of Slobodan Milošević. The new government of Yugoslavia restored to all members of the royal family both their citizenship and the use of the royal complex in Dedinje. In 2013, it was announced that the villa "Crnogorka" (meaning Montenegrin), in Uzička Street, Dedinje, was to be returned to Princess Elizabeth. The villa had been bought in 1940 by her mother Princess Olga and taken by the state in 1947. By 2013 it was owned by the Serbian government and used as the official residence of the Ambassador of Montenegro.

Elizabeth settled permanently in Belgrade, living at the Villa "Montenegrina", until she sold it in 2018.

== Arms ==
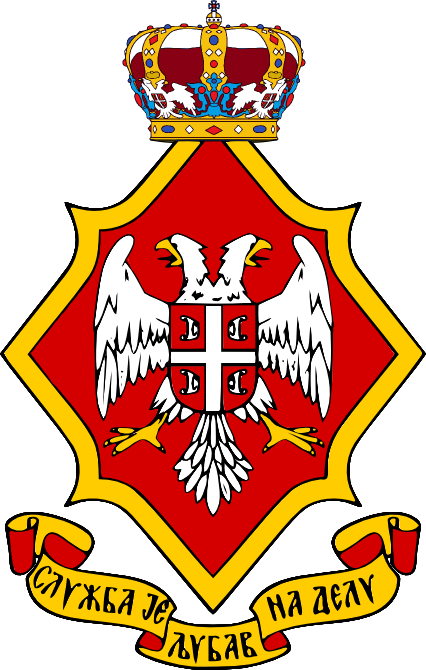
Coat of arms of Princess Elizabeth

Princess Elizabeth was granted heraldic arms on 20 June 2008. Her motto translates into English as Service Is Love In Action.

== Honours ==
- Grand Patron of the Order of the Fleur of Lys (United Kingdom).
- Dame Grand Cordon of the Royal and Hashemite Order of the Pearl (Sultanate of Sulu).

== See also ==
- Politics of Serbia
- 2004 Serbian presidential elections
- Prince Paul of Yugoslavia
