= Prince Nicholas of Greece and Denmark =

Greek prince (1872–1938)

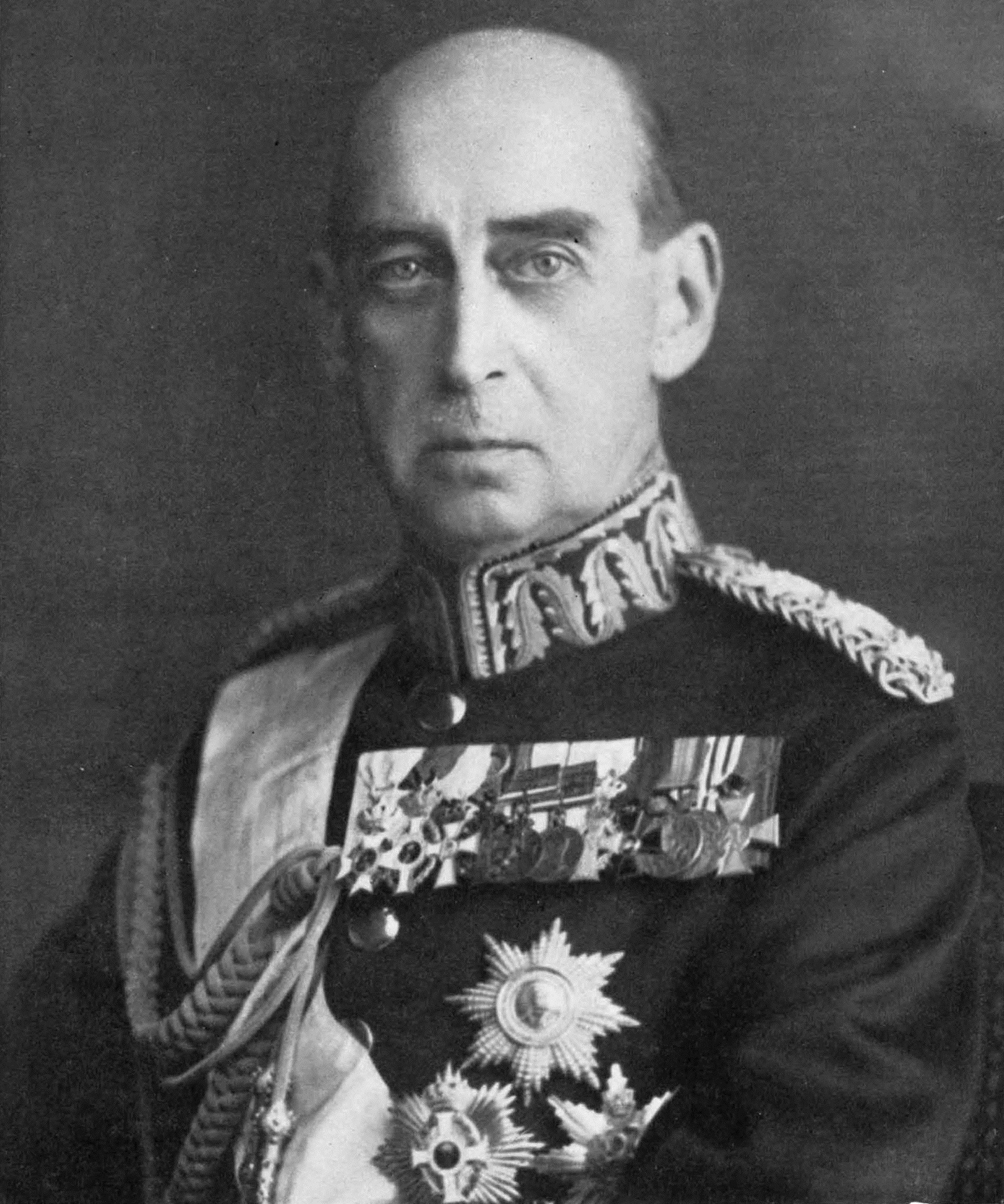
- Nicholas in 1937
- Born: 22 January 1872; Athens, Greece
- Died: 8 February 1938 (aged 66); Athens, Greece
- Cause of death: Heart Attack
- Burial: Royal Cemetery, Tatoi Palace, Greece
- Spouse: Grand Duchess Elena Vladimirovna of Russia (m. 1902)
- Issue: Olga, Princess Paul of Yugoslavia; Princess Elizabeth, Countess of Toerring-Jettenbach; Princess Marina, Duchess of Kent
- House: Glücksburg
- Father: George I of Greece
- Mother: Olga Constantinovna of Russia

Prince Nicholas of Greece and Denmark (Greek: Νικόλαος, romanized: Nikólaos; 22 January 1872 – 8 February 1938) was the fourth child and third son of King George I of Greece, and of Queen Olga. He was known as "Greek Nicky" within the family to distinguish him from his cousin Emperor Nicholas II of Russia (first cousin on the paternal side and second cousin on the maternal side). Prince Nicholas was a talented painter, often signing his works as "Nicolas Leprince".

== Marriage and issue ==
He married Grand Duchess Elena Vladimirovna of Russia (1882–1957), daughter of Grand Duke Vladimir Alexandrovich of Russia and Marie of Mecklenburg-Schwerin, the only sister of the future Russian imperial pretender, Grand Duke Kirill Vladimirovich, and his second cousin through his mother Olga Constantinovna of Russia and her father Grand Duke Vladimir Alexandrovich of Russia, on 29 August 1902 in Tsarskoye Selo, Russia.

They had three daughters:

- Princess Olga of Greece and Denmark (1903–1997); married Prince Paul of Yugoslavia. Olga was the maternal grandmother of actress Catherine Oxenberg and author Christina Oxenberg.
- Princess Elizabeth of Greece and Denmark (1904–1955); married Count Carl Theodor of Toerring-Jettenbach.
- Princess Marina of Greece and Denmark (1906–1968); married Prince George, Duke of Kent. Marina was the mother of Prince Edward, Duke of Kent, Princess Alexandra, the Honourable Lady Ogilvy, and Prince Michael of Kent.

The princesses were raised with an English nanny, Kate Fox, known as "Nurnie".

=== Residence in Athens ===
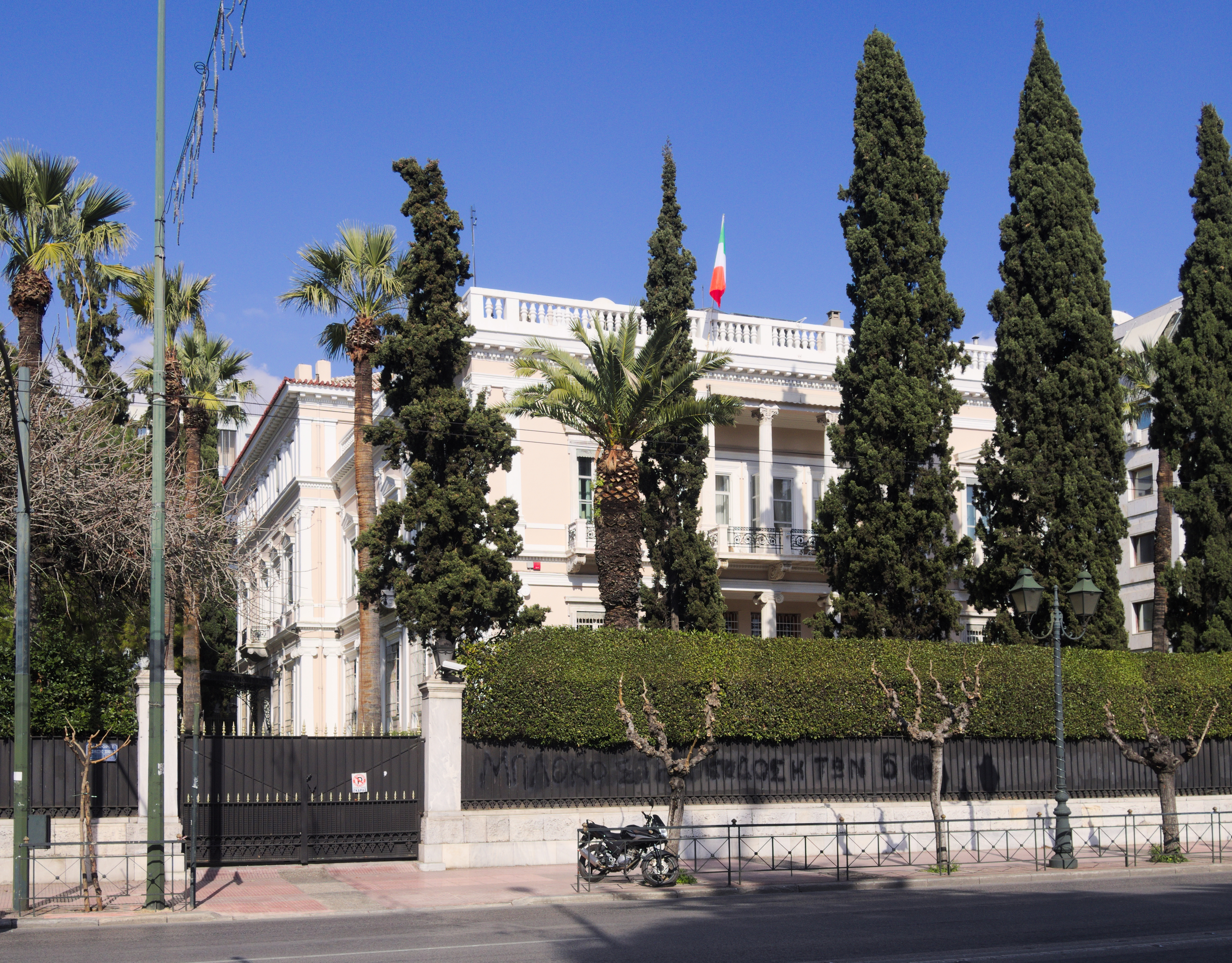
The Nicholas Palace in Athens (now the Embassy of Italy)

Nicholas' marriage significantly improved his own financial position; his wife Elena received the customary imperial dowry of a Russian Grand Duchess, amounting to 1,000,000 roubles. This amount was then equivalent to approximately US $500,000 (equivalent to $18,605,769 in 2025). The dowry capital was held in Russia, from which Elena was paid an annual income of 50,000 roubles.

After their marriage the couple resided in Athens; in late 1902 they purchased a large house near the city centre, which was thereafter known as the Nicholas Palace. The building is a neoclassical residence on Vasilissis Sofias Avenue, which was designed by Ernst Ziller for banker Stefanos Psycha during the 1880s. They commissioned the royal architect Anastasios Metaxas to enlarge it with a Ziller-inspired second block, linked by a glazed atrium that illuminated the mansion’s core works. Prince and Princess Nicholas took up residence at the newly-renovated Nicholas Palace in 1904.

The advent of the Russian Revolution in 1917 and the exile of the Greek Royal Family in 1923 had a significant impact on the couple's income, and as a result the Nicholas Palace was leased to the Hotel Grande Bretagne during the 1920s, who used the building as a 60-bed luxury annex known as the “Petit Palais”. The House was later rented by the Norwegian Embassy in 1930 and, by 1933, the Italian Embassy. The Italian Government later purchased the Nicholas Palace from the widowed Princess Nicholas in 1955; the site has subsequently remained the home of the Italian Embassy in Athens ever since.

== Public life ==
Along with his elder brothers Constantine and George, Nicholas helped to organize the 1896 Summer Olympics in Athens, the first to be held since 393. Nicholas served as president of the Sub-Committee for Shooting.

His father bequeathed him the Royal Theater of Greece which Nicholas, in turn, transferred to the Greek state in 1935. He was friends with George Simitis and was godfather to his son, future socialist Prime Minister Kostas Simitis.

== Death and burial ==
Prince Nicholas died in Athens on February 8, 1938 and was buried in the Royal tomb at the Palace of Tatoi.

== Honours ==
- Denmark:
  - R.E.: Knight of the Elephant, 7 September 1890
  - D.M.: Cross of Honour of the Order of the Dannebrog, 29 October 1891
  - Gb.E.T.: King Christian IX and Queen Louise of Denmark Golden Wedding Commemorative Medal
  - M.M. 8 Apr.: King Christian IX Centenary Medal
- Spain:
  - Cross of Naval Merit, with White Decoration, 27 January 1892
  - Grand Cross of the Order of Charles III, with Collar, 15 May 1902
- United Kingdom: GCVO: Honorary Knight Grand Cross of the Royal Victorian Order, 16 August 1901
- Grand Duchy of Hesse: Grand Cross of the Ludwig Order, 18 April 1904
- Kingdom of Italy: Knight of the Annunciation, 8 April 1907
