= Princess Marina of Greece and Denmark =

Duchess of Kent (1906–1968)

Princess Marina
- Duchess of Kent (more)
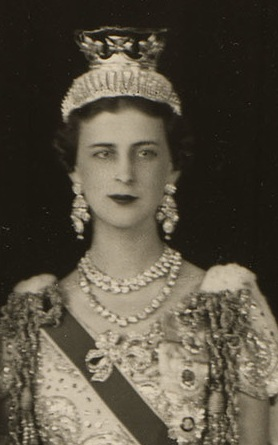
- Marina at the coronation of her brother-in-law George VI in 1937
- Born: 13 December 1906; Athens, Greece
- Died: 27 August 1968 (aged 61); Kensington Palace, London, England
- Burial: 30 August 1968; Royal Burial Ground, Frogmore
- Spouse: Prince George, Duke of Kent (m. 1934; died 1942)
- Issue: Prince Edward, Duke of Kent; Princess Alexandra, The Honourable Lady Ogilvy; Prince Michael of Kent
- House: Glücksburg
- Father: Prince Nicholas of Greece and Denmark
- Mother: Grand Duchess Elena Vladimirovna of Russia

Princess Marina of Greece and Denmark (Greek: Μαρίνα; 13 December [O.S. 30 November] 1906 – 27 August 1968), later Duchess of Kent, was a Greek and Danish princess by birth and a British princess by marriage. A granddaughter of King George I of Greece and Queen Olga, she was the daughter of Prince Nicholas of Greece and Denmark and Grand Duchess Elena Vladimirovna of Russia. In 1934, she married Prince George, Duke of Kent, the fourth son of King George V and Queen Mary. They had three children: Edward, Alexandra, and Michael. She was widowed in 1942, when her husband was killed in a plane crash while on active service, and remained active in royal duties throughout her later life, attending public engagements across the Commonwealth, including the independence celebrations for Ghana and Botswana. She died in 1968, aged 61.

== Early life ==
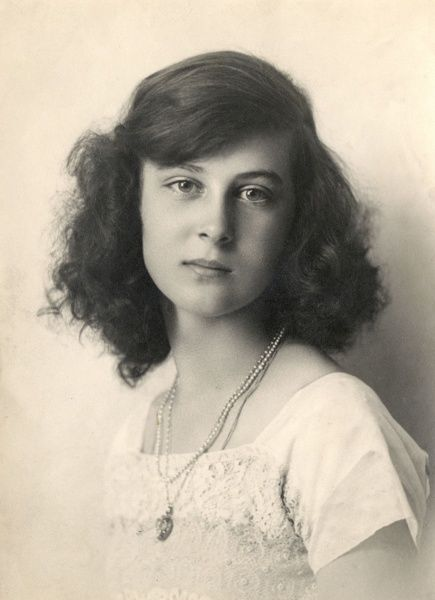
Marina in 1920

Marina was born on 13 December 1906 in Athens, Greece, during the reign of her paternal grandfather, George I of Greece. She was the third and youngest daughter of Prince Nicholas of Greece and Denmark and his wife, Grand Duchess Elena Vladimirovna of Russia. Her father was the third son of George I of Greece and Queen Olga, while her mother was the only daughter of Grand Duke Vladimir Alexandrovich and Grand Duchess Maria Pavlovna of Russia. Through her father she was a great-granddaughter of Christian IX of Denmark, and through her mother a great-granddaughter of Emperor Alexander II of Russia.

Marina had two elder sisters, Princess Olga and Princess Elizabeth. Olga married Prince Paul of Yugoslavia in 1923; following the assassination of his cousin, Alexander I of Yugoslavia, Paul served as Prince Regent of Yugoslavia from 1934 to 1941. Elizabeth married Carl Theodor, Count of Toeering-Jettenbach in 1934. One of their paternal uncles was Prince Andrew of Greece and Denmark, father of Prince Philip, Duke of Edinburgh, making Marina and her sisters Philip's first cousins.

Marina spent her early years in Greece and lived with her parents and paternal grandparents at Tatoi Palace. She and her sisters were raised to be devout and religious, a quality encouraged by their grandmother, Queen Olga of Greece. The family travelled outside Greece frequently, especially during the summer months. Marina's first recorded visit to Britain was in 1910, when she was three, following the death of her godfather, Edward VII. During that visit she met her godmother and future mother-in-law, Queen Mary, who treated Marina and her sisters as if they were her own children.

The Greek royal family was forced into exile when Marina was 11, following the overthrow of the monarchy. They later settled in Paris, while Marina spent periods living with her extended family across Europe.

== Marriage and children ==
=== Wedding ceremony ===
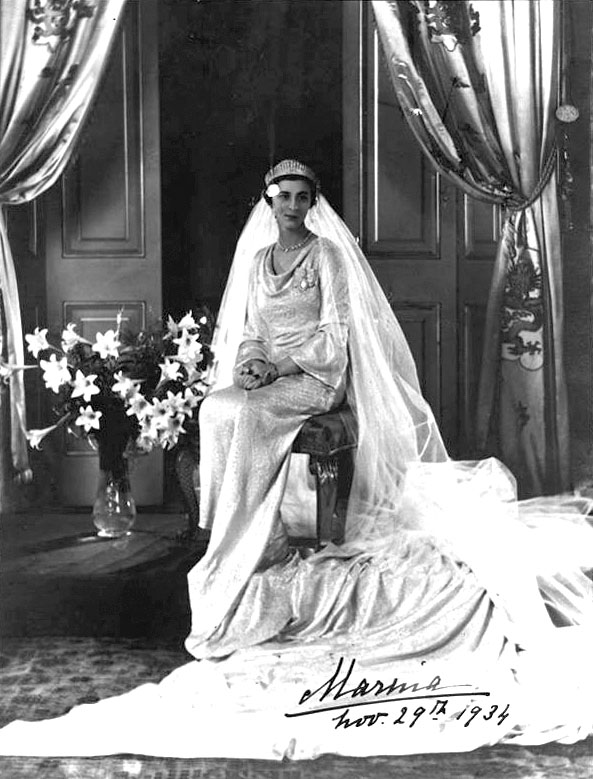
Marina on her wedding day

In 1932, Marina met Prince George (later the Duke of Kent), her second cousin through Christian IX of Denmark, in London. Their betrothal was announced in August 1934, and George was created Duke of Kent on 9 October. They married at Westminster Abbey on 29 November. It was the first major royal wedding since that of Prince Albert, Duke of York (later George VI), and Lady Elizabeth Bowes-Lyon (later Queen Elizabeth the Queen Mother) 11 years earlier. The ceremony was the first royal wedding to be broadcast by wireless, using microphones connected to a control room located beneath the Unknown Warrior's tomb. The service was transmitted both within Britain and overseas, and loudspeakers allowed spectators outside the Abbey to hear the proceedings. A Greek Orthodox ceremony followed in the private chapel at Buckingham Palace, which was temporarily converted for the occasion. Marina remains the most recent foreign princess to marry into the British royal family.

=== Married life ===
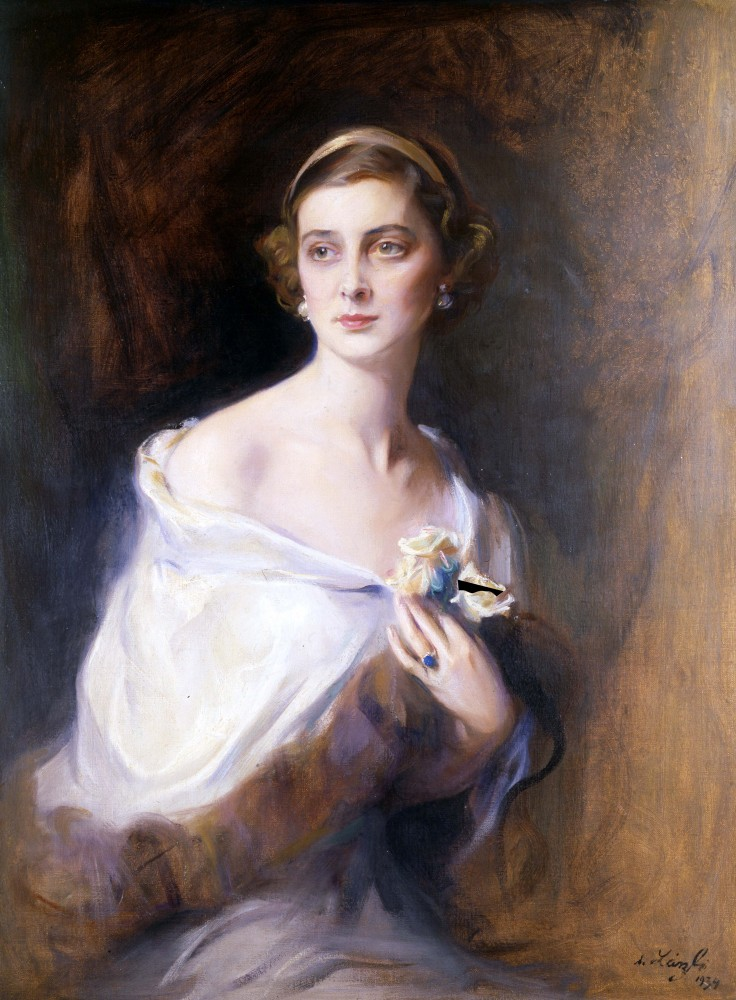
Portrait by Philip de László, 1934

Marina and George established their first home at 3 Belgrave Square, close to Buckingham Palace. George also inherited Coppins from Princess Victoria. Marina became patroness of several organisations and charities, including the Elizabeth Garrett Anderson Hospital, the Women's Hospital Fund, and the Central School of Speech and Drama, causes she continued to support throughout her life. She developed a close relationship with her mother-in-law with whom she often spent time while George was undertaking royal duties.

The couple had three children:

- Prince Edward, Duke of Kent (born 9 October 1935), who married Katharine Worsley on 8 June 1961; they had three children.
- Princess Alexandra, The Honourable Lady Ogilvy (born 25 December 1936), who married the Hon. Angus Ogilvy, son of David Ogilvy, 12th Earl of Airlie, and Lady Alexandra Coke, on 24 April 1963; they had two children.
- Prince Michael of Kent (born 4 July 1942), who married Baroness Marie Christine von Reibnitz on 30 June 1978; they have two children.

George was killed on 25 August 1942 in an air crash at Eagle's Rock, near Dunbeath, Caithness, Scotland, while on active service with the Royal Air Force. According to royal biographer Hugo Vickers, Marina was "the only war widow in Britain whose estate was forced to pay death duties".

During the Second World War, Marina trained as a nurse for three months under the pseudonym "Sister Kay" and joined the Civil Nursing Reserve.

== Later life and death ==
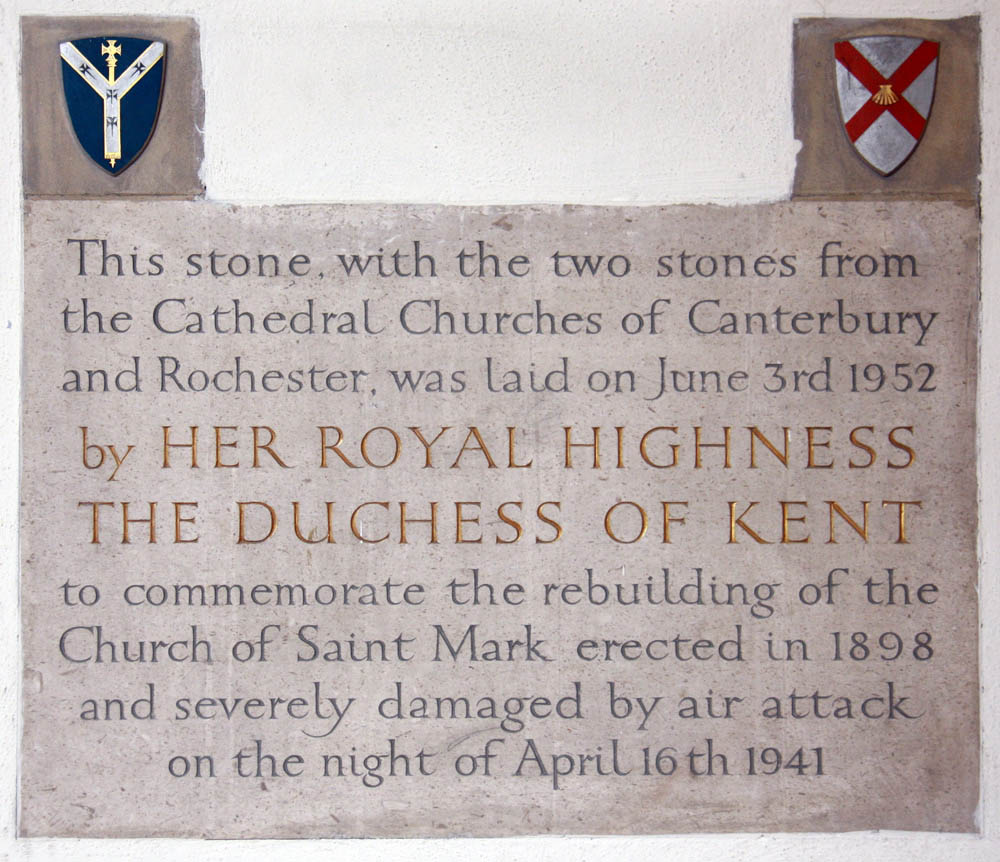
The foundation stone of St Mark's, Bromley, laid by Marina

After her husband's death, Marina continued to be an active member of the British royal family, carrying out a wide range of royal and official engagements. She served as president of the Wimbledon All England Lawn Tennis and Croquet Club for 26 years, and was president of the Royal National Lifeboat Institution from 1943 until her death. In recognition of her contribution, she was awarded the RNLI's gold medal in 1967.

In 1947, Marina visited Greece and Italy. In June 1952, she laid the foundation stone of the new St Mark's Church in Bromley, London, which had been damaged in the war.

Later in 1952, Marina visited Sarawak (then a British Crown Colony), where she laid the foundation stone of the St. Thomas's Cathedral in Kuching. She also visited the Batu Lintang camp, a former Japanese internment camp that had been converted into a teacher training college, and travelled to Sibu, where she opened the outpatient department of the Lau Kheng Howe Hospital.

In 1954, Marina was granted an Apartment at Kensington Palace as a permanent grace-and-favour residence. During her early widowhood she had often stayed with her mother-in-law at Marlborough House; however Mary's death in 1953 created a need for Marina to have her own London residence. The Apartment had stood vacant for nearly 15 years, having previously been the home of Princess Louise, Duchess of Argyll, prior to her death in 1939. As the apartment was considered too large for Marina's needs, its eastern half was divided to create Apartment 1A. The works were budgeted at £80,000 but ultimately cost £127,000. During the renovations, Marina reportedly considered removing an original Wren staircase inside Apartment 1, finding it "too much like a servant's staircase" and too narrow for descending in full evening dress; palace officials intervened to prevent its removal. Marina and her three children took up residence in October 1955, and Apartment 1 remained her home until her death in 1968.

In March 1957, when the Gold Coast achieved independence from Britain as Ghana, Marina was appointed to represent the Queen at the celebrations. 50 years later, at the 50th anniversary of Ghana's independence, her son, Edward, was appointed by the Queen to represent her.

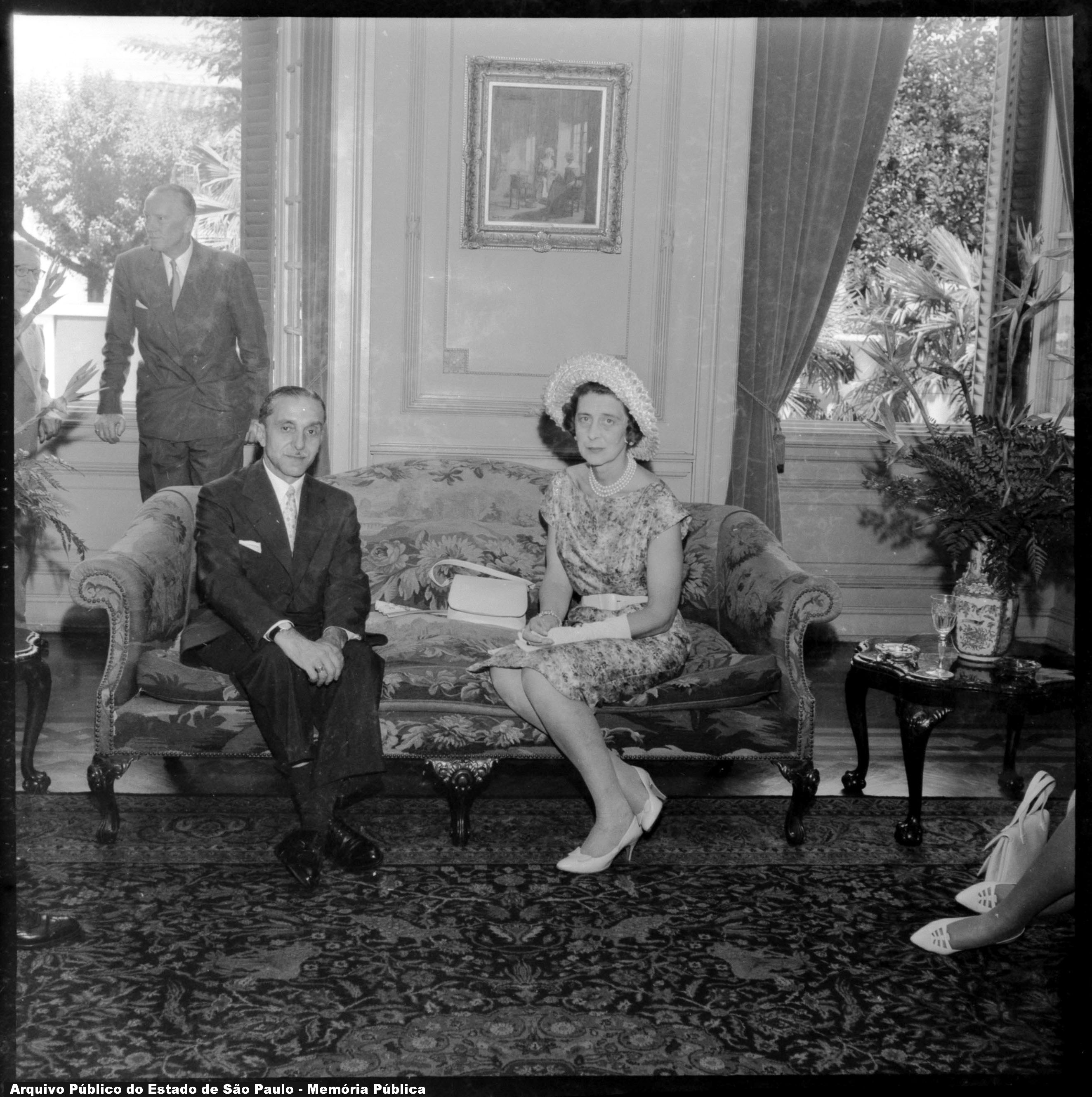
Marina with the governor of São Paulo, Carvalho Pinto, in 1960

Marina earned a place in the International Best Dressed List Hall of Fame in 1960, together with the Princess of Monaco, Patricia Lopez-Willshaw, and Merle Oberon. In 1964, she undertook an extensive tour of Australia and officially opened Gladesville Bridge in Sydney.

In September and October 1966, when the British Protectorates of Bechuanaland and Basutoland became the Republic of Botswana and the Kingdom of Lesotho respectively, Marina was again appointed to represent the Queen at both independence celebrations. The main public hospital in Gaborone, the new capital of Botswana, is named Princess Marina Hospital. She served as Chancellor of the University of Kent at Canterbury from 1963 until her death.

Marina died at 11:40 am on 27 August 1968 at Kensington Palace from a brain tumour, aged 61. Her funeral service was held at St. George's Chapel, Windsor Castle, on 30 August. She was buried in the Royal Burial Ground, Frogmore. Her funeral was the last royal ceremony attended by her brother-in-law, the former king Edward VIII. Marina's will was sealed in London after her death. Her estate was valued at £76,166 (equivalent to £940,600 in 2022).

== Legacy ==
Marina gave her name to a number of institutions and facilities, including:

- Princess Marina College, Arborfield, Berkshire
- Princess Marina House, a facility of the Royal Air Force Benevolent Fund at Rustington.
- Princess Marina Hospital, Upton, Northamptonshire
- Princess Marina Hospital, Gaborone, Botswana
- Princess Marina Sports Complex, Rickmansworth.
- Duchess of Kent Hospital, Sandakan, Sabah, Malaysia
- Institute of Teacher Education Kent Campus, Tuaran, Sabah, Malaysia

== References in popular culture ==
- The Kinks recorded "She's Bought a Hat Like Princess Marina" for their 1969 album Arthur (or the Decline and Fall of the British Empire). The song was written by Ray Davies.
- In 2017, Clare Holman portrayed Marina in the season 2 finale of The Crown.

== Titles, styles, honours, and arms ==
=== Titles and styles ===
Marina was known as the Princess Marina of Greece. After her marriage she was styled Her Royal Highness The Duchess of Kent, and was later known as Her Royal Highness The Princess Marina, Duchess of Kent.

=== Honours ===
Commonwealth

- GCStJ: Dame Grand Cross of the Order of St. John of Jerusalem, 1935
- CI: Companion of the Order of the Crown of India, 1937
- GBE: Dame Grand Cross of the Order of the British Empire, 1937
- GCVO: Dame Grand Cross of the Royal Victorian Order, 1948
- Recipient of the King George VI Coronation Medal
- Recipient of the Queen Elizabeth II Coronation Medal
- Royal Family Order of King George V
- Royal Family Order of King George VI
- Royal Family Order of Queen Elizabeth II

Foreign

- Grand Decoration in Gold with Sash for Services to the Republic of Austria

Dynastic

- (Russian Empire) House of Romanov: Dame Grand Cordon of the Imperial Order of Saint Catherine
- Kingdom of Greece: Dame Grand Cross of the Royal Family Order of Saints Olga and Sophia

=== Honorary military appointments ===
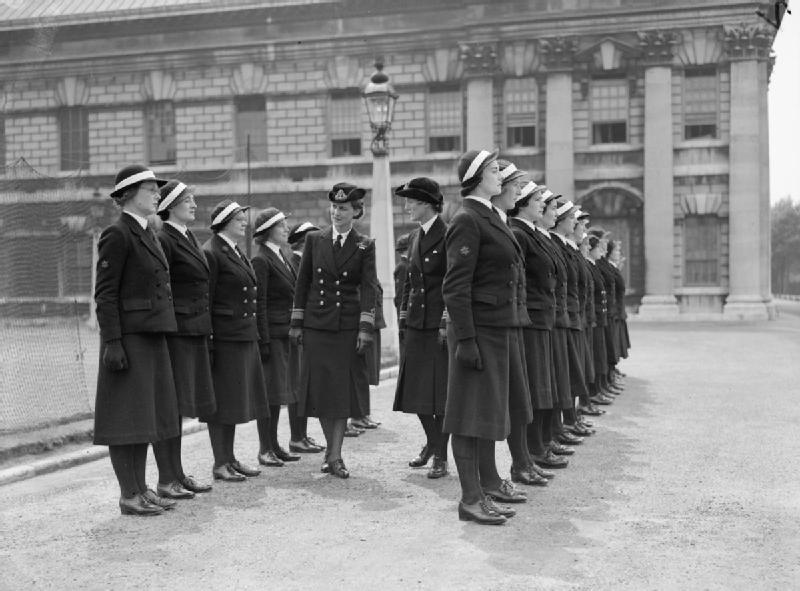
Marina inspecting cadets of the WRNS officers' training course, 1941

Canada

- (Canada) Colonel-in-Chief, The Essex and Kent Scottish (1942 – 1968)

United Kingdom

- (United Kingdom) Colonel-in-Chief, of The Queen's Own Royal West Kent Regiment
- (United Kingdom) Colonel-in-Chief, of the Royal Electrical and Mechanical Engineers
- (United Kingdom) Honorary Colonel, of the Buckinghamshire Battalion, The Oxfordshire and Buckinghamshire Light Infantry
- (United Kingdom) Honorary Colonel, of the Buckinghamshire Regiment, RA (Territorials)
- (United Kingdom) Commandant, Women's Royal Naval Service (1940–1968) (Chief Commandant from 1951)

=== Arms ===
Coat of arms of Princess Marina, Duchess of Kent

Royal monogram of Princess Marina, Duchess of Kent

== Ancestry ==
Ancestors of Princess Marina of Greece and Denmark

8. Christian IX of Denmark
4. George I of Greece
9. Princess Louise of Hesse-Kassel
2. Prince Nicholas of Greece and Denmark
10. Grand Duke Konstantin Nikolayevich of Russia
5. Grand Duchess Olga Constantinovna of Russia
11. Princess Alexandra of Saxe-Altenburg
1. Princess Marina, Duchess of Kent
12. Alexander II of Russia
6. Grand Duke Vladimir Alexandrovich of Russia
13. Princess Marie of Hesse and by Rhine
3. Grand Duchess Elena Vladimirovna of Russia
14. Frederick Francis II, Grand Duke of Mecklenburg-Schwerin
7. Duchess Marie of Mecklenburg-Schwerin
15. Princess Augusta Reuss of Köstritz

== See also ==
- List of people with brain tumours

Princess Marina of Greece and Denmark House of Schleswig-Holstein-Sonderburg-Glücksburg Cadet branch of the House of Oldenburg Born: 13 December 1906 Died: 27 August 1968
Academic offices
Preceded by New university	Chancellor of the University of Kent; 1963–1968	Succeeded by Jo Grimond
