= Vittorio Emanuele, Prince of Naples =

Disputed Head of the House of Savoy from 1983 to 2024

Vittorio Emanuele
- Prince of Naples; Duke of Savoy (disputed)
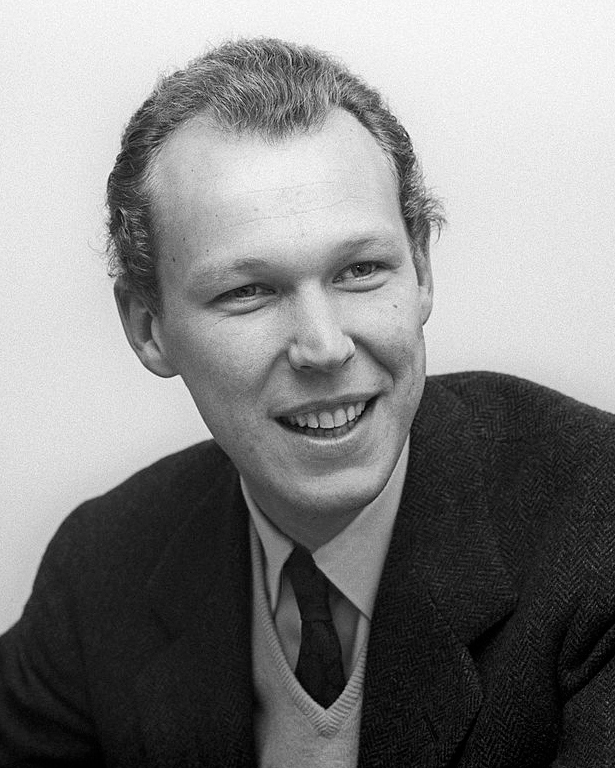
- Vittorio Emanuele in 1964

Head of the House of Savoy (disputed)
- Period: 18 March 1983 – 3 February 2024
- Predecessor: King Umberto II
- Successor: Prince Emanuele Filiberto
- Born: 12 February 1937; Naples, Kingdom of Italy
- Died: 3 February 2024 (aged 86); Geneva Cantonal Hospital, Geneva, Switzerland
- Burial: 1 July 2024; Basilica of Superga, Turin, Italy
- Spouse: Marina Ricolfi-Doria (m. 1971)
- Issue: Emanuele Filiberto, Prince of Venice
Names
- Italian: Vittorio Emanuele Alberto Carlo Teodoro Umberto Bonifacio Amedeo Damiano Bernardino Gennaro Maria di Savoia
- House: Savoy
- Father: Umberto II of Italy
- Mother: Marie-José of Belgium

Prince Vittorio Emanuele of Savoy, Prince of Naples (Note: Titles associated with the former Italian royal family have not been legally recognised by the Italian government since Temporary Provision XIV was incorporated in the Constitution of Italy in 1946.) (Vittorio Emanuele Alberto Carlo Teodoro Umberto Bonifacio Amedeo Damiano Bernardino Gennaro Maria di Savoia; 12 February 1937 – 3 February 2024), was a son of Umberto II, the last King of Italy, and Marie-José of Belgium. Vittorio Emanuele also used the title Duke of Savoy and claimed the headship of the House of Savoy. These claims were disputed by supporters of his third cousin, Prince Amedeo, Duke of Aosta, and later by Amedeo's son, Aimone.

Vittorio Emanuele lived for most of his life in exile, following the 1946 Italian constitutional referendum, which affirmed the abolition of the monarchy and the creation of the Italian Republic. On several occasions, he was the centre of controversy in Italy and abroad due to a series of incidents, including remarks that were seen by some as antisemitic. He was revealed to be a member of Propaganda Due (P2) lodge which had been involved in high-level corruption and political manipulation. In France, he was tried on a murder charge, of which he was cleared of unlawful killing but convicted of a firearms offence. Vittorio Emanuele was arrested in 2006 on charges of criminal association, racketeering, conspiracy, corruption, and exploitation of prostitution. He was acquitted of all charges in 2007 and 2010.

== Early life and family ==
Vittorio Emanuele was born on 12 February 1937 in Naples to Umberto, Prince of Piedmont, who would later become the last King of Italy as Umberto II, and Princess Marie-José of Belgium. The Italian royal family was exiled from Italy when he was nine years old. He lived in Switzerland from the time he was exiled until the law banning members of the former royal family from Italy was abolished in 2002. Vittorio Emanuele had three sisters, an older sister Princess Maria Pia and two younger sisters, Princess Maria Gabriella and Princess Maria Beatrice. Princess Maria Pia married Prince Alexander of Yugoslavia in 1955, the son of Prince Paul of Yugoslavia and Princess Olga of Greece and Denmark. In 2003, she remarried Prince Michel of Bourbon-Parma, son of Prince René of Bourbon-Parma and Princess Margaret of Denmark and the younger brother of Queen Anne of Romania. Vittorio Emanuele was also a first cousin of the King Baudouin of Belgium, former King Albert II of Belgium, the Grand Duchess Joséphine-Charlotte of Luxembourg, Moritz, Landgrave of Hesse and Tsar Simeon II of Bulgaria.

After an eleven-year relationship, Vittorio Emanuele married Swiss biscuit heiress and world-ranked water skier Marina Doria in Tehran, Iran, on 7 October 1971. Their wedding was announced on the occasion of the 2,500-year celebration of the Persian Empire. Coincidentally, Vittorio Emanuele and his wife Marina share a birthday (12 February) but Vittorio Emanuele was two years younger than Marina (she was born in 1935).

Vittorio Emanuele worked as a banker and an aircraft salesman and then an arms dealer.

Vittorio Emanuele, Prince of Naples, had a son, Prince Emanuele Filiberto of Savoy, Prince of Venice, born on 22 June 1972. Emanuele Filiberto married Clotilde Courau in 2003 and they have two daughters together.

=== Duke of Savoy ===
On 7 July 2006, Vittorio Emanuele's kinsman and dynastic rival, Amedeo, 5th Duke of Aosta, declared himself to be the head of the House of Savoy and Duke of Savoy, claiming that Vittorio Emanuele had lost his dynastic rights when he married without the permission of Umberto II in 1971. Amedeo received the support of the President of the Council of Senators of the Kingdom Aldo Alessandro Mola and Vittorio Emanuele's sister, Maria Gabriella.

Vittorio Emanuele and his son applied for a judicial injunction to forbid Amedeo from using the title "Duke of Savoy". In February 2010, the court of Arezzo ruled that the Duke of Aosta and his son must pay damages totalling €50,000 to their cousins and cease using the surname Savoy instead of Savoy-Aosta. However, the verdict was overturned on appeal, with the court of second resort allowing Amedeo the use of the short surname, in the form of di Savoia, and additionally revoking the financial penalty originally imposed on him.

== Exile from and return to Italy ==
=== Reasons for exile ===
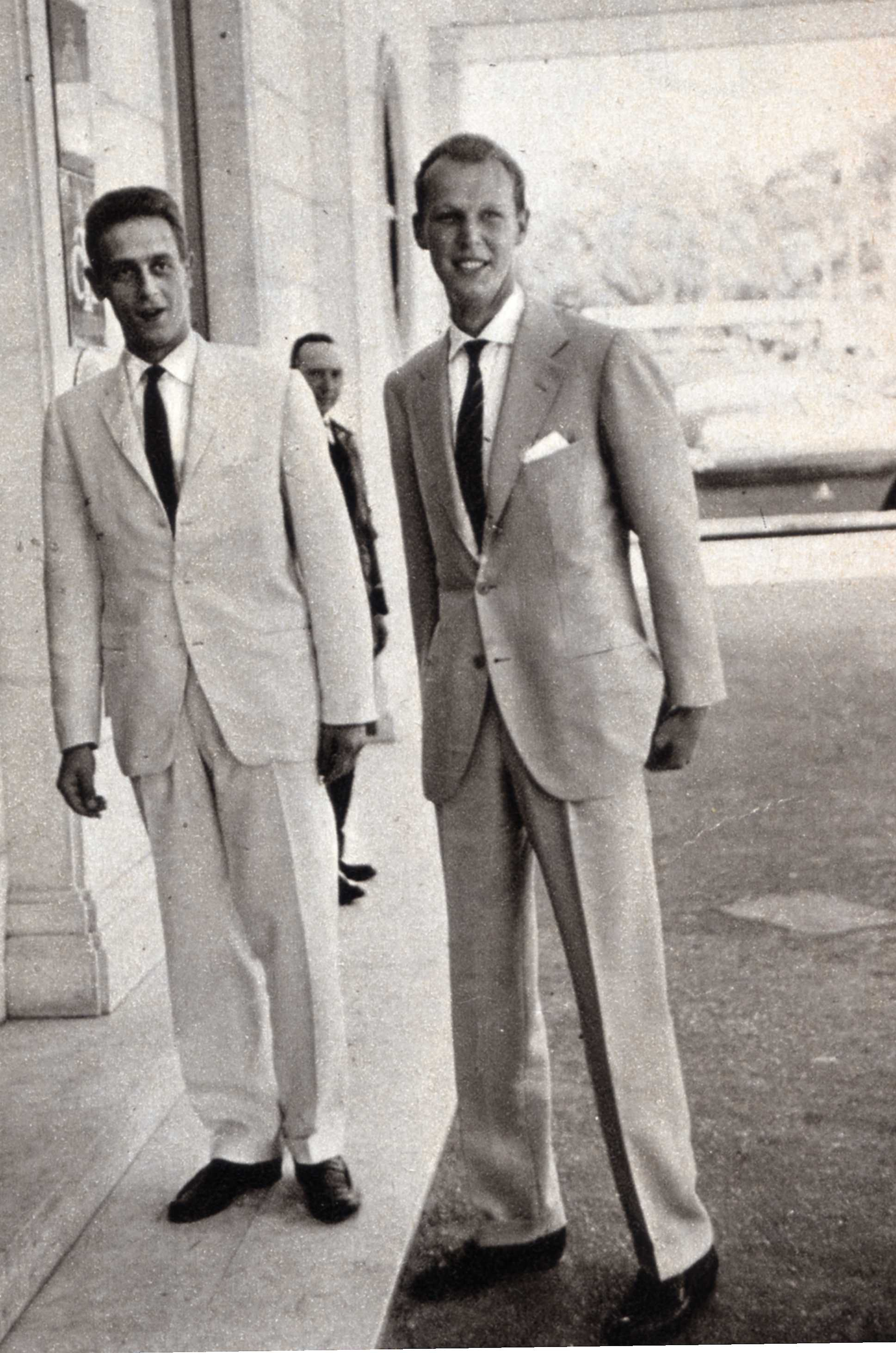
Vittorio Emanuele and Amadeo (Duke of Aosta) together in 1964, before their falling out.

In line with certain other countries that were formerly monarchies (such as France or Romania), the Italian Constitution required all male members of the House of Savoy to leave Italy and barred them from ever returning to Italian soil again. This was enacted as a "temporary disposition" enacted when the constitution was promulgated in 1948. The constitution also forbade any amendment that would change the republican form of government, effectively foreclosing any effort to restore the monarchy short of adopting a new constitution.

=== Requests for return ===
Vittorio Emanuele lobbied the Parliament of Italy over the years in which the law prohibiting his return was in force, to be allowed to return to his homeland after 56 years in exile. In 1999, he filed a case at the European Court of Human Rights, in which the Prince charged that his lengthy exile violated his human rights. In September 2001, the court decided to hold a hearing on the case at a date to be fixed later.

Before his return to his homeland, he renounced any claim to Italy's crown jewels, which were stored in a deposit box at the Bank of Italy. He publicly stated that the crown jewels "are no longer ours", referring to the House of Savoy. At the time, he hoped that the crown jewels would be publicly displayed. However, the royal family asked for the jewels back in 2021 and sued the Italian government and the Bank of Italy in 2022 when they were not returned.

In February 2002, Vittorio Emanuele and his son Emanuele Filiberto wrote a signed letter, published through a law firm, in which they formally expressed their loyalty to the Constitution of Italy.

=== Return to Italy ===
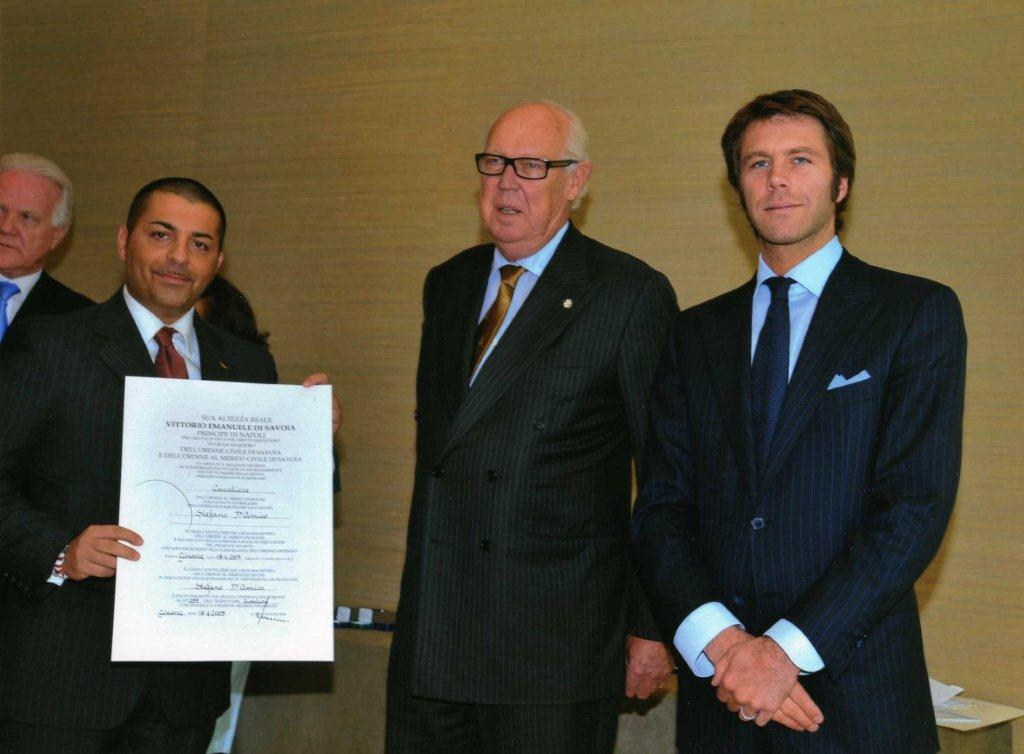
Investiture of a knight (2009)

On 23 October 2002, the provision in the constitution that barred male members of the former royal house from returning to Italy was repealed. As part of a deal with the government, Vittorio Emanuele signed an agreement renouncing all claims to the defunct throne and recognizing the Republic as the only lawful government of Italy. Vittorio Emanuele was permitted to re-enter the country on 10 November 2002. On 23 December 2002, he made his first trip home in over half a century. On the one-day visit he, his wife, and his son had a 20-minute audience with Pope John Paul II at the Vatican.

Upon their first visit in 2003 to Naples, where Vittorio Emanuele was born, and from where his family sailed into exile in 1946, the reception of the Savoys was mixed; most people were indifferent to them, some hostile, a few supportive. The media reported that many in Naples were not happy to see the return of the family when hundreds of noisy demonstrators chanted negative slogans as they progressed through the city. Demonstrations were staged by two traditionally opposing factions: anti-monarchists on one hand, and supporters of the House of Bourbon-Two Sicilies, the royal house deposed when Italy was united in 1861 under the House of Savoy.

== Death ==
Vittorio Emanuele died in Geneva Cantonal Hospital, Switzerland on 3 February 2024, aged 86. A statement from the Royal House of Savoy gave the time of his death as 07:05 (CET).

His funeral was held on 10 February 2024 in the Turin Cathedral and, afterwards, he was cremated. Attendees at his funeral included his widow Marina, Princess of Naples, his son Prince Emanuele Filiberto, Prince of Venice, his daughter-in-law Princess Clotilde, Princess of Venice, his granddaughter Princess Vittoria, Princess of Carignano, his sister Princess Maria Pia of Bourbon-Parma, his nephew Prince Dimitri of Yugoslavia, Prince Aimone, Duke of Aosta, and Princess Olga, Duchess of Aosta, Prince Jean of Luxembourg, the Prince of Monaco, Queen Sofía of Spain, Leka, Prince of Albania, Boris, Prince of Turnovo, Fuad II of Egypt, Prince Philippos of Greece and Denmark, Afonso, Prince of Beira, Prince Carlo, Duke of Castro, John T. Dunlap, and Daniel McVicar. The ashes were subsequently buried in the Royal Crypt of the Basilica di Superga.

== Controversies ==
=== Unilateral declaration of kingship (1969) ===
Vittorio Emanuele unilaterally declared himself King of Italy on 15 December 1969. He argued that by agreeing to submit to a referendum on his place as head of state, his father had thereby abdicated. Vittorio Emanuele took this action after his father allegedly called for Amedeo, 5th Duke of Aosta to visit him in Portugal to name him his heir. Under his self-assumed powers as King of Italy, Vittorio Emanuele conferred the title of Duchess of Sant'Anna di Valdieri on his then-fiancée, Marina Doria.

=== Dirk Hamer's death (1978–2015) ===
On the night of 17 August or the morning of 18 August 1978, on the island of Cavallo (which lies off the south coast of Corsica), Vittorio Emanuele discovered his yacht's rubber dinghy had been taken and attached to another nearby yacht. Arming himself with a rifle, he attempted to board the vessel. He shot at a passenger he had awakened; the shot missed the passenger but mortally wounded Dirk Hamer (the 19-year-old son of Ryke Geerd Hamer), a passenger sleeping on the deck of another adjacent yacht. The prince was taken into police custody on the morning of 18 August 1978. He admitted civil liability for the accident in a letter dated 28 August 1978 and on 5 September 1978 paid 500,000 French francs to the Hamer family. He was released from custody, under judicial supervision, on 5 October 1978. Dirk Hamer later died of his wounds on 7 December 1978 before he could provide any evidence.

On 11 October 1989, Vittorio Emanuele was indicted on charges of inflicting lethal injury and possession of a dangerous weapon. However, on 18 November 1991, after thirteen years of legal proceedings, the Paris Assize Court acquitted him of the fatal wounding and unintentional homicide charges, finding him guilty only of unauthorised possession of an M1 carbine. He received a six-month suspended prison sentence.

When incarcerated in June 2006 on unconnected charges of corruption (see below, Arrest and imprisonment), Vittorio Emanuele was recorded admitting that "I was in the wrong, [...] but I must say I fooled them [the French judges]", leading to a call from Dirk Hamer's sister Birgit for Vittorio Emanuele to be retried in Italy for killing her brother.

Birgit Hamer undertook a long legal fight to obtain the full video. She stated: "What for us is a confession is a boast for him: he laughs about the fact that he killed a boy." The story of the video was broken by aristocratic journalist Beatrice Borromeo, who also wrote the preface for a book on the murder, Delitto senza castigo by Birgit Hamer. Vittorio Emanuele sued the newspaper for defamation, claiming the video had been manipulated. In 2015, a court judgement ruled in favour of the newspaper. On Twitter Borromeo posted: "Vincere una causa è sempre piacevole, ma contro Vittorio Emanuele di Savoia la goduria è doppia!" ("Winning a case is always nice, but against Victor Emmanuel of Savoy the pleasure is double"), which resulted in a spat on Twitter with his son Emanuele Filiberto.

=== Allegations of antisemitism (2003) ===
Vittorio Emanuele also said in 2003 that the antisemitic laws passed under Mussolini's regime were "not that terrible". In response, the president of the Union of Italian Jewish Communities, Amos Luzzatto, stated "I'm not saying it was he who signed the racial laws in 1938. But, as a Savoy heir, Victor Emmanuel has never distanced himself from them," in an interview with Il Corriere della Sera newspaper.

On 27 January 2005, in a letter published by Il Corriere della Sera, Vittorio Emanuele issued an apology to Italy's Jewish population, asking forgiveness from the Italian Jewish community, and declaring that it was an error for the Italian Royal Family to have signed the racial laws of 1938.

=== Fight with Amedeo (2004) ===
On 21 May 2004, following a dinner held by King Juan Carlos I of Spain at the Zarzuela Palace on the eve of the wedding of his son Felipe, Prince of Asturias, Vittorio Emanuele punched his third cousin and arch-rival Amedeo, Duke of Aosta, twice in the face, causing him to fall down the steps. Former Queen Anne-Marie of Greece caught Amedeo to prevent him further injuring himself and helped him indoors, staunching his bleeding face until first aid could be administered. Upon learning of the incident, Juan Carlos reportedly declared that "never again" would an opportunity to abuse his hospitality be afforded to the competing pretenders.

=== Arrest and imprisonment (2006) ===
On 16 June 2006, Vittorio Emanuele was arrested in Varenna and imprisoned in Potenza on charges of corruption and recruitment of prostitutes for clients of the Casinò di Campione of Campione d'Italia.

The enquiry was conducted by Italian magistrate John Woodcock, of British ancestry, famous for other VIPs' arrests.

Woodcock described Emanuele as the "undisputed leader" of an influence-trafficking network associated with Sicilian organized crime.

After several days, Vittorio Emanuele was released and placed under house arrest. He was released from house arrest on 20 July 2006 but had to stay within the borders of Italy. Vittorio Emanuele was acquitted of all charges in the years 2007 and 2010.

La Repubblica reported in 2006 that Emanuele Filiberto had distanced himself from his father.

=== Seeking compensation from Italy (2007) ===
In 2007, Vittorio Emanuele and his son, Emanuele Filiberto, requested formally that the state pay financial damages of €260 million, and initiate full restitution of all properties and belongings that had been confiscated from the royal house after the abolition of the monarchy. The financial damages claim is based on having suffered moral injustice during the exile. The Italian government has rejected the request and, in response, indicated that it may seek damages for historic grievances.

== Succession ==
In June 2023, his son Emanuele Filiberto, Prince of Venice, announced his intention to renounce his claim to the throne in favour of his daughter, Princess Vittoria of Savoy, when he felt she was ready to succeed.

== Honours ==
Styles of Prince Vittorio Emanuele
- Reference style: His Royal Highness
- Spoken style: Your Royal Highness

=== National dynastic honours ===
Vittorio Emanuele was the Sovereign of the Dynastic Orders of the House of Savoy which consist of:

- (Kingdom of Italy) House of Savoy: Sovereign Knight of the Royal Supreme Order of the Most Holy Annunciation
- (Kingdom of Italy) House of Savoy: Sovereign Knight Grand Cross of the Royal Order of Saints Maurice and Lazarus
- (Kingdom of Italy) House of Savoy: Sovereign Knight Grand Cross of the Royal Order of the Crown
- (Kingdom of Italy) House of Savoy: Grand Master of the Royal Civil Order of Savoy
- (Kingdom of Italy) House of Savoy: Grand Master of the Royal Military Order of Savoy
- (Kingdom of Italy) House of Savoy: Grand Master of the Royal Order of Merit of Savoy

=== National honours ===
- Sovereign Military Order of Malta: Bailiff Knight Grand Cross of Justice of the Sovereign Military Order of Malta, Special Class
- (Kingdom of the Two Sicilies) Two Sicilian Royal Family: Bailiff Knight Grand Cross with Collar of Justice of the Two Sicilian Royal Sacred Military Constantinian Order of Saint George

=== Foreign honours ===
- Kingdom of Greece: Knight Grand Cross of the Royal Order of the Redeemer
- Monaco: Knight Grand Cross of the Order of Saint-Charles
- (Kingdom of Montenegro) Montenegrin Royal Family: Knight of the Order of Petrović Njegoš
- (Kingdom of Montenegro) Montenegrin Royal Family: Knight Grand Cross of the Royal Order of Prince Danilo I
- (Kingdom of Montenegro) Montenegrin Royal Family: Knight of the Order of Saint Peter of Cetinje
- Empire of Iran: Recipient of the Commemorative Medal of the 2,500-year celebration of the Persian Empire

== Ancestry ==
Ancestors of Vittorio Emanuele, Prince of Naples

8. Umberto I of Italy
4. Victor Emmanuel III of Italy
9. Princess Margherita of Savoy
2. Umberto II of Italy
10. Nicholas I of Montenegro
5. Princess Elena of Montenegro
11. Milena Vukotić
1. Vittorio Emanuele, Prince of Naples
12. Prince Philippe, Count of Flanders
6. Albert I of Belgium
13. Princess Marie of Hohenzollern-Sigmaringen
3. Princess Marie-José of Belgium
14. Karl Theodor, Duke in Bavaria
7. Duchess Elisabeth of Bavaria
15. Infanta Maria Josepha of Portugal

=== Patrilineal descent ===
Male Ancestors of Vittorio Emanuele, Prince of Naples

Vittorio Emanuele's patriline is the line from which he is descended father to son.

Patrilineal descent is the principle behind membership in royal houses, as it can be traced back through the generations, which means that Vittorio Emanuele is a member of the House of Savoy.

House of Savoy

1. Umberto I, Count of Savoy, c. 980–about 1047/1048
2. Otto I, Count of Savoy, about 1010/1020–c. 1057
3. Amadeus II, Count of Savoy, c. 1050–1080
4. Umberto II, Count of Savoy, 1065–1103
5. Amadeus III, Count of Savoy, 1095–1148
6. Umberto III, Count of Savoy, 1135–1189
7. Thomas I, Count of Savoy, 1178–1233
8. Thomas, Count of Savoy, Lord of Piedmont, 1199–1259
9. Amadeus V, Count of Savoy, 1253–1323
10. Aymon, Count of Savoy, 1291–1343
11. Amadeus VI, Count of Savoy, 1334–1383
12. Amadeus VII, Count of Savoy, 1360–1391
13. Amadeus VIII, Duke of Savoy, 1383–1451
14. Louis, Duke of Savoy, 1413–1465
15. Philip II, Duke of Savoy, 1438–1497
16. Charles III, Duke of Savoy, 1486–1553
17. Emmanuel Philibert, Duke of Savoy, 1528–1580
18. Charles Emmanuel I, Duke of Savoy, 1562–1630
19. Thomas Francis, Prince of Carignano, 1596–1656
20. Emmanuel Philibert, Prince of Carignano, 1628–1709
21. Victor Amadeus I, Prince of Carignano, 1690–1741
22. Louis Victor, Prince of Carignano, 1721–1778
23. Victor Amadeus II, Prince of Carignano, 1743–1780
24. Charles Emmanuel, Prince of Carignano, 1770–1800
25. Charles Albert of Sardinia, 1798–1849
26. Victor Emmanuel II of Italy, 1820–1878
27. Umberto I of Italy, 1844–1900
28. Victor Emmanuel III of Italy, 1869–1947
29. Umberto II of Italy, 1904–1983
30. Vittorio Emanuele, Prince of Naples, 1937–2024

== Gallery ==
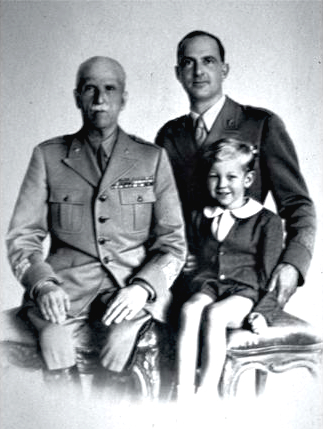
Prince Vittorio Emanuele with his father, King Umberto II and his grandfather King Vittorio Emanuele III

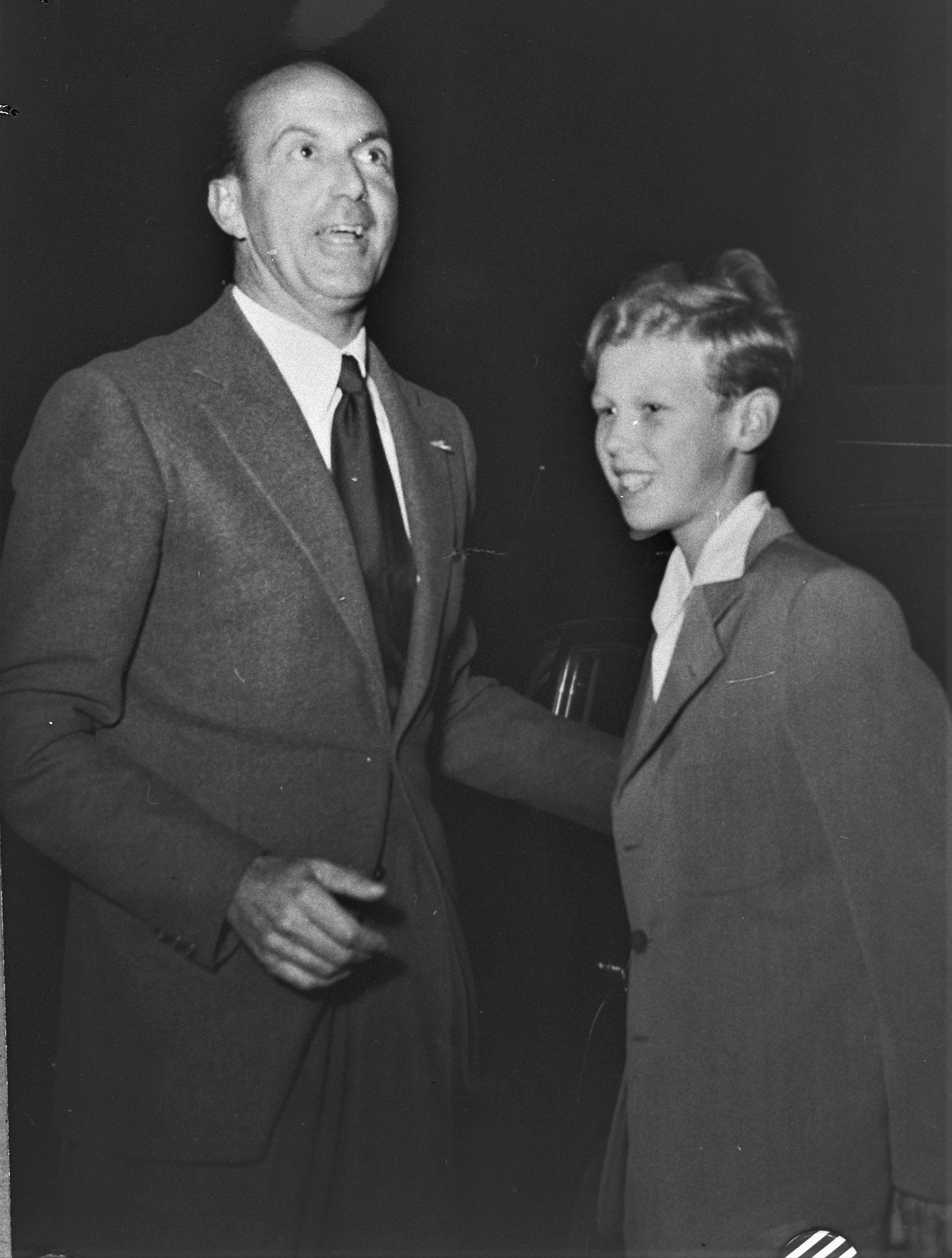
Prince Vittorio Emanuele with his father, King Umberto II

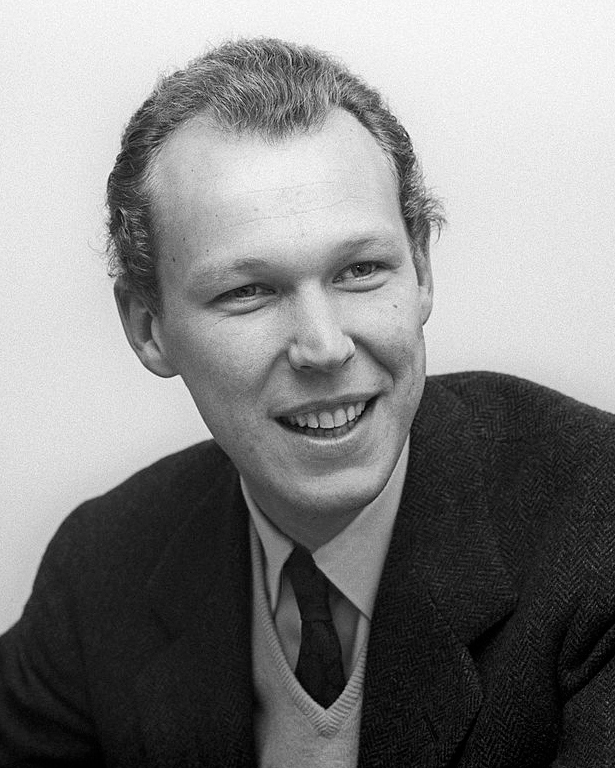
Vittorio Emanuele in 1964

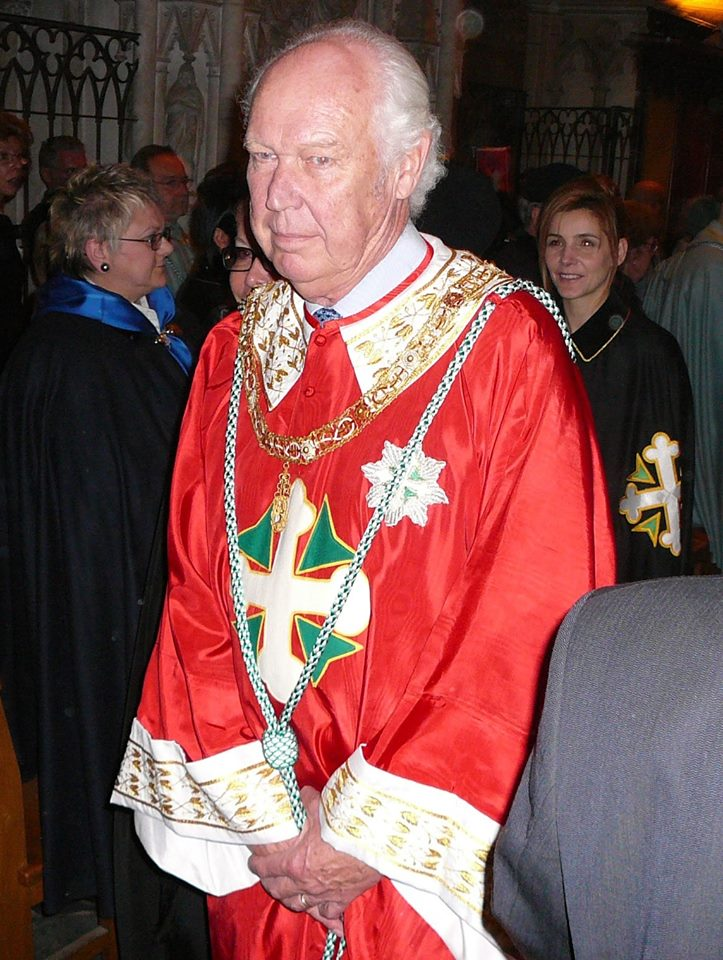
Vittorio Emanuele as Grandmaster of the Order of Saints Maurice and Lazarus

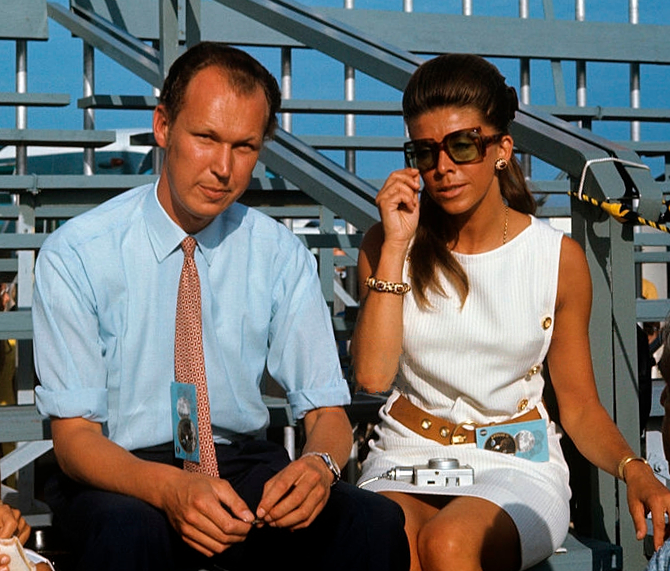
Vittorio Emanuele and Marina Doria, Cape Canaveral, 16 July 1969 (Apollo 11)

== Bibliography ==
- Hamer, Birgit (2011). Borromeo, Beatrice (ed.). Delitto senza castigo: la vera storia di Vittorio Emanuele di Savoia [Crime without Punishment: the True Story of Vittorio Emanuele di Savoia] (in Italian). Reggio Emilia: Aliberti. ISBN 978-88-7424-735-6.

Vittorio Emanuele, Prince of Naples House of Savoy Born: 12 February 1937 Died: 3 February 2024
Italian royalty
| Preceded by King Umberto II | Head of the House of Savoy; 18 March 1983 – 3 February 2024 | Succeeded by Emanuele Filiberto, Prince of Venice |
Titles in pretence
| Preceded by King Umberto II | — TITULAR — King of Italy; 18 March 1983 – 3 February 2024; Reason for succession failure: Monarchy abolished in 1946 | Succeeded by Emanuele Filiberto, Prince of Venice |
