= Princess Maria Pia of Bourbon-Parma =

Italian princess (born 1934)

Princess Maria Pia
- Princess Alexander of Yugoslavia; Princess Michel of Bourbon-Parma
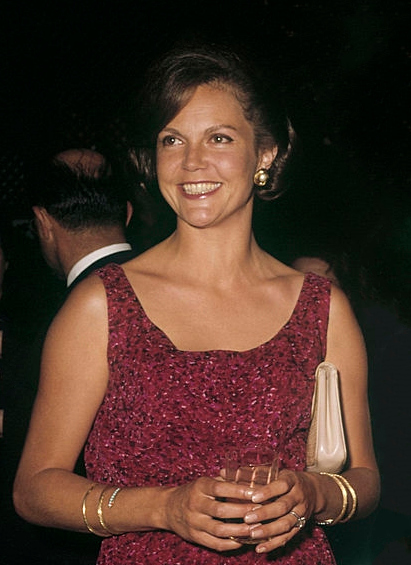
- Princess Maria Pia in 1963
- Born: 24 September 1934 (age 91); Naples, Kingdom of Italy
- Spouses: Prince Alexander of Serbia (m. 1955; div. 1967) Prince Michel of Bourbon-Parma (m. 2003; died 2018)
- Issue: Prince Dimitri Karađorđević; Prince Michael Karađorđević; Prince Sergius Karađorđević; Princess Helen Karađorđević
Names
- Maria Pia Elena Elisabetta Margherita Milena Mafalda Ludovica Tecla Gennara
- House: Savoy
- Father: Umberto II of Italy
- Mother: Marie-José of Belgium

Maria Pia Elena Elisabetta Margherita Milena Mafalda Ludovica Tecla Gennara di Savoia (born 24 September 1934), known as Princess Maria Pia of Savoy, is the eldest daughter of Umberto II of Italy and Marie-José of Belgium. She is the older sister of Prince Vittorio Emanuele, Prince of Naples, Princess Maria Gabriella of Savoy and Princess Maria Beatrice of Savoy.

== Biography ==
Maria Pia was the first-born child of the Prince and Princess of Piedmont, born in Naples, Italy in 1934. Her parents, married since 1930, were unhappy together, as her mother confessed in an interview many years later (On n'a jamais été heureux, "We were never happy"), and separated after the Italian monarchy was abolished by plebiscite on 2 June 1946. Exiled, the family gathered briefly in Portugal, and she and her three younger siblings soon went with their mother to Switzerland while their father remained in the Portuguese Riviera.

Maria Pia is a first cousin of the late King Baudouin of Belgium, former King Albert II of Belgium, the late Grand Duchess Joséphine-Charlotte of Luxembourg, Moritz, Landgrave of Hesse, and Tsar Simeon II of Bulgaria.

She lives in Neuilly-sur-Seine, near Paris, and Palm Beach, Florida.

== Marriages and issue ==
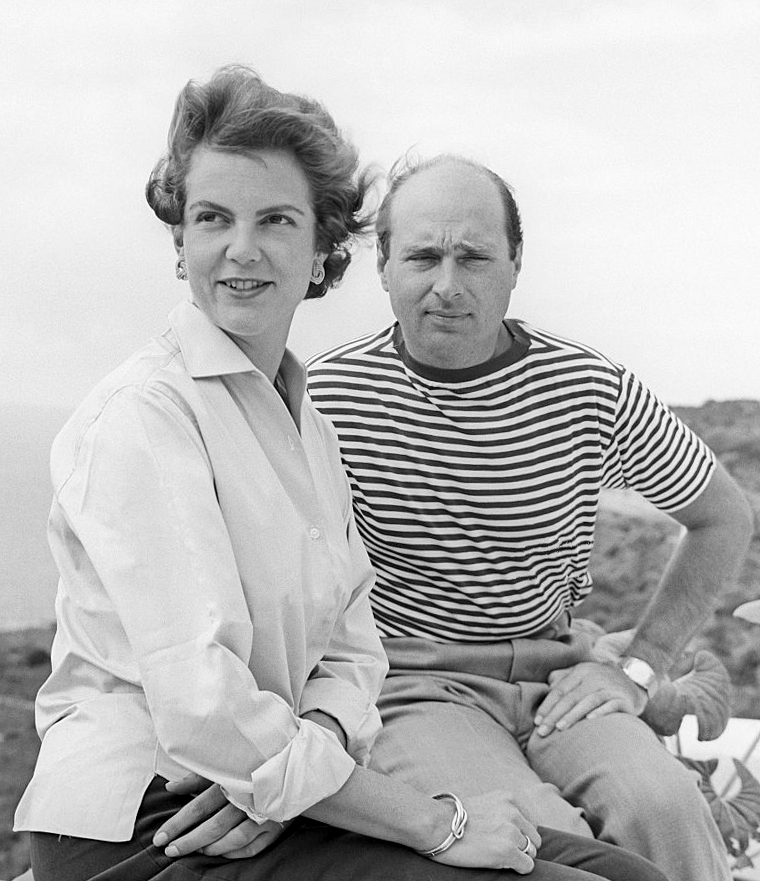
With her first husband Alexander of Yugoslavia in 1958.

She took part in the ship tour organized by Queen Frederica and her husband King Paul of Greece in 1954, which became known as the "Cruise of the Kings" and was attended by over 100 royals from all over Europe. On the royal yacht Agamemnon, she met and later married Prince Alexander of Yugoslavia (1924–2016), son of Prince Paul of Yugoslavia and Princess Olga of Greece and Denmark, on 12 February 1955 at Cascais in Portugal, where Maria Pia's father was living in exile.

Three years after their wedding, Maria Pia gave birth to the couple's set of fraternal twin sons. Another set of twins was born to Maria Pia during the marriage five years later, this time a girl and a boy:

- Prince Dimitri Umberto Anton Peter Maria of Yugoslavia (born 18 June 1958)
- Prince Michael Nicolas Paul George Maria of Yugoslavia (born 18 June 1958)
- Prince Sergius "Serge" Wladimir Emanuel Maria of Yugoslavia (born 12 March 1963); married Sophie de Toledo on 6 November 1985. They divorced in 1986. He was remarried to Eleonora Rajneri on 18 September 2004 from whom he is officially separated. He has a child named Umberto Emmanuel Dimitri, with Christiane Galeotti, born in 2018.
- Princess Helene Olga Lydia Tamara Maria of Yugoslavia (born 12 March 1963); married Thierry Gaubert on 12 January 1988, with issue. The couple divorced and she remarried to Stanislas Fougeron on 12 March 2018. They live in Château de Villeprévost, the Fougeron family estate acquired by Armand-François Fougeron (1757–1832), advisor to the Kings of France.

The couple were divorced in 1967, and Alexander married Princess Barbara of Liechtenstein, a cousin of that principality's monarch. They had one son, Prince Dušan Paul.

In 2003, Maria Pia was married to Prince Michel of Bourbon-Parma (1926–2018), son of Prince René of Bourbon-Parma and Princess Margaret of Denmark, whose marriage with Princess Yolande de Broglie-Revel had been annulled and with whom he has five dynastic children, also being the father of a child born out of wedlock in 1977, Amélie de Bourbon de Parme (married in 2009 to Igor Bogdanoff). Through him, she was the sister-in-law of Queen Anne of Romania.

== Select bibliography ==
- Pia di Savoia, Maria (2010). La mia vita, i miei ricordi. Mondadori Electa. ISBN 978-8837071417.
