= Michael of Yugoslavia =

Michael of Yugoslavia may refer to:

- Prince Michael of Yugoslavia (born 1985), son of Prince Tomislav of Yugoslavia
- Prince Michael of Yugoslavia (born 1958), son of Prince Alexander of Yugoslavia and grandson of Prince Paul of Yugoslavia
