= Prince Dimitri of Yugoslavia =

Member of the House of Karađorđević

Prince Dimitri
- Born: 18 June 1958 (age 68); Boulogne-Billancourt, France
Names
- Dimitri Nicholas Paul George Maria
- House: Karađorđević
- Father: Prince Alexander of Serbia
- Mother: Princess Maria Pia of Savoy
- Religion: Catholic

Prince Dimitri Karađorđević (born 18 June 1958), also known as Dimitri Karađorđević is a gemologist and a member of the extended House of Karađorđević, the former royal family of the defunct Kingdom of Yugoslavia. He founded the jewellery firm bearing his name, Prince Dimitri Company and continues to serve as its president and creative director. He was formerly senior vice president of the jewellery department of the Sotheby's auction house. He was named in the International Best Dressed List's Hall of Fame in 1994.

== Life and career ==
Born in Boulogne-Billancourt, France, Prince Dimitri was raised in Versailles, attending boarding schools in France and Switzerland. He graduated from the University of Paris with a degree in business law and moved to New York City in 1983.

Originally pursuing a career on Wall Street, he decided to move into the field of jewellery and was offered a position in Sotheby's jewellery department, eventually rising to senior vice president. During his sixteen years with Sotheby's, he also became an appraiser and studied gemology. Prince Dimitri began designing jewellery in 1999, with a collection of gemstone cufflinks that was sold at Bergdorf Goodman and Saks Fifth Avenue. He also designed a line of women's jewellery for Barneys New York and Neiman Marcus. In 2002, he moved to the Phillips de Pury & Luxembourg auction house to head their jewellery department. In 2007, he and business partner Todd Morley founded the Prince Dimitri Company, which opened a salon in Manhattan. His jewelry has also been sold at auction by Christie's.

=== Author ===
Prince Dimitri wrote the Book Once Upon a Diamond, which focuses on his Families Tradition of Royal Jewels, he wriote it waith Lavina Branca Snyder, while Carolina Herrera wrote the foreword and François Curiel wrote the introduction.

Prince Dimitri also contributed a blurb the historical work on his family titled, The Royal House of Savoy: Unfiers of Italy by the author Gino Lupini

== Family ==
Dimitri and Michael are the first set of twins born to Prince Alexander of Yugoslavia and his first wife, Princess Maria Pia of Savoy, the eldest daughter of Umberto II of Italy in 1958. Maria Pia had a second set of twins, Prince Serge and Princess Helene in 1963. They have a younger half-brother, Prince Dushan Karađorđević, from their father's second marriage to Princess Barbara of Liechtenstein.

Prince Dimitri belongs to the cadet branch of the Royal House of Serbia, descending from Prince Paul of Yugoslavia. He is a third cousin of Alexander, Crown Prince of Serbia.

== Honours ==
- (Kingdom of Yugoslavia) House of Karađorđević: Knight Grand Cordon of the Royal Order of the Star of Karađorđe
- (Kingdom of Italy) House of Savoy: Knight of the Supreme Order of the Most Holy Annunciation

== Ancestry ==
Dimitri is a member of the House of Karađorđević. He is a great-great-grandson of Prince Alexander, Prince of Serbia (reigned 1842–1858). Through his father, Dimitri descends from kings George I of Greece and Christian IX of Denmark, as well as emperor Alexander II of Russia.

Through his mother, Dimitri descends from kings Umberto II of Italy, Albert I of Belgium, and furthermore from Nicholas I of Montenegro and Miguel I of Portugal.
