= Fert =

Fert may refer to:

- Albert Fert, a French physicist who enabled a breakthrough in gigabyte hard disk drives.
- FERT, the motto of the former Italian Royal House of Savoy and Kingdom of Italy
- The acrophonic name of the letter Ef (Cyrillic) in the old Russian alphabet
- A very weak opening bid in the game of contract bridge (short for fertiliser), used in strong pass systems; see Glossary of contract bridge terms#fert
