= Dimitri of Yugoslavia =

Dimitri of Yugoslavia may refer to:

- Prince Dimitri of Yugoslavia (b. 1958), son of Prince Alexander of Yugoslavia
- Prince Dimitri of Yugoslavia (b. 1965), son of Prince Andrej of Yugoslavia
