= FERT =

Motto of the House and former state of Savoy

Lesser coat of arms of the Kingdom of Italy (1890)

FERT (sometimes tripled, FERT, FERT, FERT) is the motto of the royal House of Savoy and Kingdom of Italy. The motto was adopted by Duke Vittorio Amedeo II (1666–1732).

It appeared for the first time on the collar of the Supreme Order of the Most Holy Annunciation, or Ordine Supremo della Santissima Annunziata, the primary dynastic order of the kingdom. This ceased to be a national order when Italy became a republic in 1946. The order remains under the jurisdiction of the head of the House of Savoy, however, as hereditary Sovereign and Grand Master.

== Etymology ==
The meaning of the letters has been a matter of some controversy, to which a number of interpretations have been offered. The motto is believed to be an acronym of:

- Foedere et Religione Tenemur (Latin: "Treaty and religion bind us");
- Fortitudo Eius Rhodum Tenuit (Latin: "His strength conquered Rhodes" or "By his bravery he held [or occupied] Rhodes"), referring to the victory of Amadeus V, Count of Savoy (1249–1323), who fought in the 1315 siege of Rhodes;
- Fortitudo Eius Rempublicam Tenet (Latin: "His bravery [or strength] preserves [or defends] the state"), referencing the same ruler — Amadeus V.
- Fides Est Regni Tutela (Latin: "Faith is the protector of [our] Kingdom")

It has also been suggested that the letters are actually the Latin word fert (third-person singular present active indicative of ferre), meaning '[he/she/it] suffers/bears', possibly referring to Jesus bearing the sins of the world.

A French-language parody of FERT was said by Savoy's neighbors to mean Frappez, Entrez, Rompez Tout (French: "Strike, Enter, Break Everything"), from the Savoyard penchant for chevauchée.

== Gallery ==
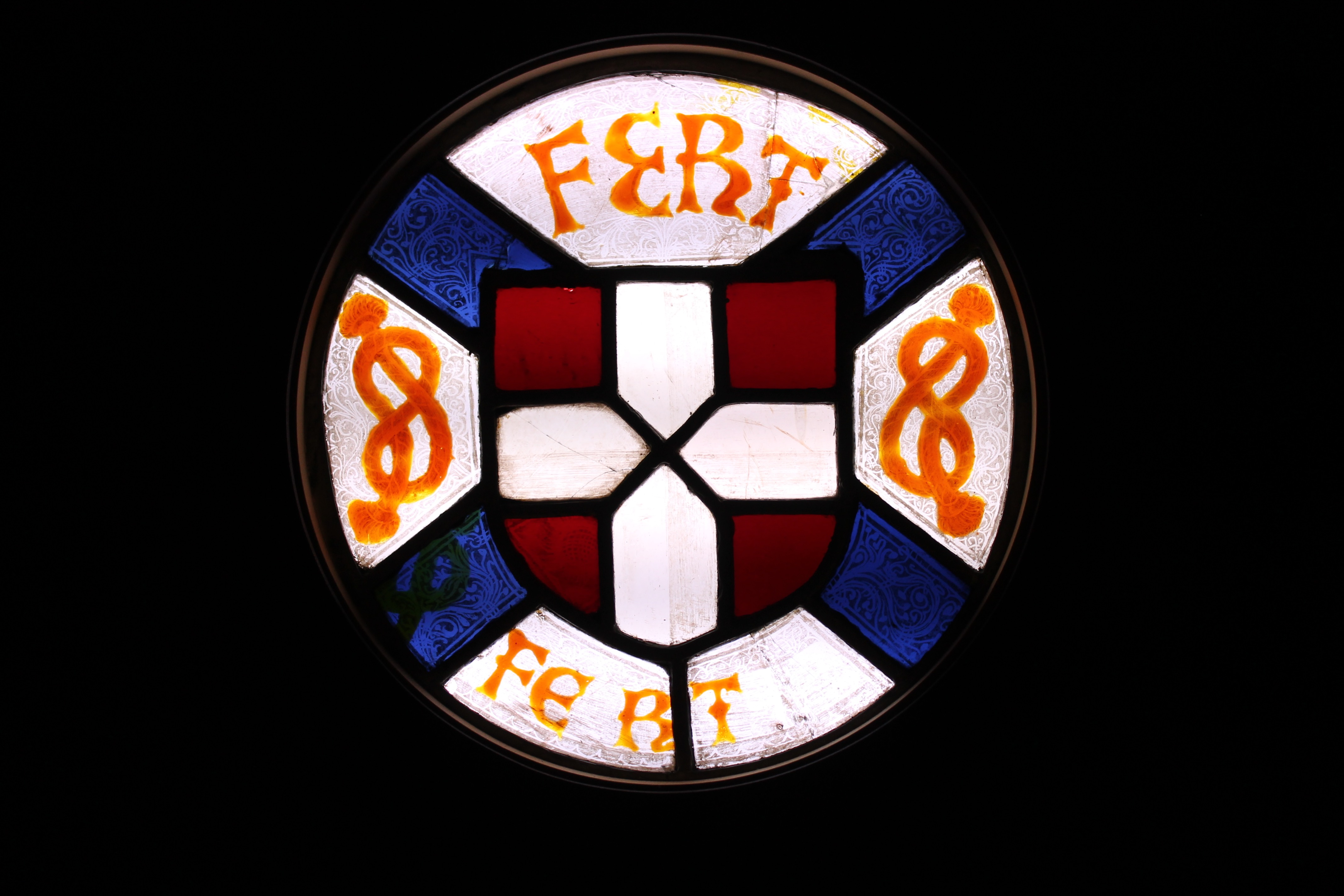
Stained glass with the coat of Amadeus VIII, Duke of Savoy

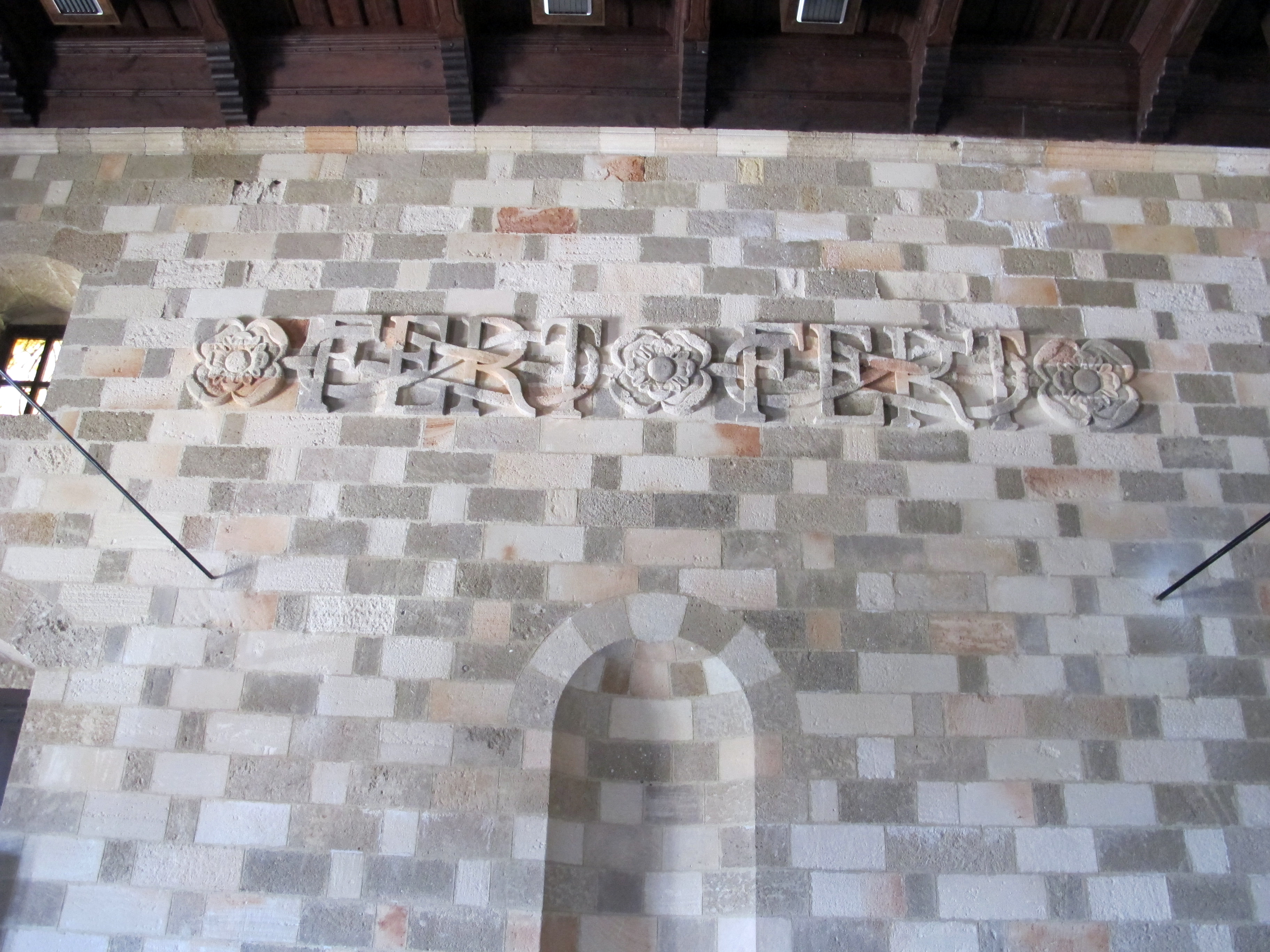
The motto in the main hall of the Palace of the Grand Master of the Knights of Rhodes

Flag of the Italian Protectorate of Albania

Coat of arms of Italian East Africa

== See also ==
- A.E.I.O.U. – another motto of a European dynasty (the House of Habsburg) whose precise meaning and origin is similarly unclear.
