= François Curiel =

François Curiel Commander of the Legion of Honour
- Born: 1948 (age 77–78)
- Education: Art History
- Occupations: Auctioneer, Jewellery specialist
- Employer: Christie's
- Known for: Chairman of Christie's in Europe
- Board member of: Christie's, Boucheron

François Curiel (born 1948) is a French citizen, auctioneer, jewellery specialist and Chairman of Christie's in Europe, based in Geneva, Switzerland.

== Early life ==
Growing up he studied philosophy and law as well as gemology in Paris, France. After completing a then compulsory year in the military, he was accepted at Christie's of London for an internship during the summer of 1969. Joining the jewellery department, he was offered a permanent job at the end of his internship.

== Career ==
Curiel began his career as a jewellery specialist at Christie's in London in 1969, and held various management positions at Christie's Spain (1972-1974), Switzerland (1975-1975), USA (1976-1989), Switzerland (1990-1999), France (2000-2009) before going to head up Asia Pacific in Hong Kong (2010-2018). He returned to Europe in 2019 when he was appointed Chairman of Europe and a member of the company executive committee.

Guillaume Cerutti, a business executive, commented the following: “During his 45 years with Christie’s, François has cultivated an extensive global network following his time living in all three regions and is one of the greatest ambassadors of our firm,” and “He leaves Asia having grown the business significantly by engaging a new generation of art collectors and encouraging Asian consignors and buyers to transact with Christie’s on a global scale.”

According to an interview in Haute Living, Curiel is "often described as one of the greatest auctioneers of our time".

From 2001 to 2009 he was a permanent member of the Fine Art Auction Authority, the regulatory body of auction houses in France and in 2004 he became a member of the British Royal Institute of Surveyors.

In 2009, he received France's most prestigious distinction when he was promoted Officer of the Legion of Honor. He went on to be elevated to the rank of Commander of the French Legion of Honor in 2016.

In a lunch interview with the Financial Times in 2010, they described him as being "Renowned for his auctioneering skills, particularly in his speciality, jewellery, Curiel is a Christie’s man through and through".
