= Prince Alexander of Yugoslavia (1924–2016) =

Eldest son of Prince Paul of Yugoslavia

Prince Alexander
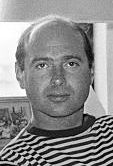
- Alexander in 1958
- Born: 13 August 1924; White Lodge, Richmond Park, England
- Died: 12 May 2016 (aged 91); Paris, France
- Burial: St. George's Church, Serbia
- Spouses: Princess Maria Pia of Savoy (m. 1955; div. 1967) Princess Barbara of Liechtenstein (m. 1973)
- Issue: Prince Dimitri; Prince Michael; Prince Sergius; Princess Helene; Prince Dušan
- House: Karađorđević
- Father: Paul, Prince Regent of Yugoslavia
- Mother: Princess Olga of Greece and Denmark

Prince Alexander of Yugoslavia (Serbian: Александар П. Карађорђевић / Aleksandar P. Karađorđević; 13 August 1924 – 12 May 2016) was the elder son of Prince Paul, who served as Regent of Yugoslavia in the 1930s, and his wife, Princess Olga of Greece and Denmark.

== Birth and education ==
Alexander was born at White Lodge, Richmond Park, United Kingdom. As a nephew of Princess Marina, Duchess of Kent (née of Greece and Denmark), he was a first cousin of Prince Edward, Duke of Kent, Prince Michael of Kent, and Princess Alexandra of Kent; he was also a first cousin once removed of Prince Philip, Duke of Edinburgh. He was educated at Ludgrove School.

== Marriages and family ==
He took part in the ship tour organized by Queen Frederica and her husband King Paul of Greece in 1954, which became known as the “Cruise of the Kings” and was attended by over 100 royals from all over Europe. On the royal yacht Agamemnon, he met his future wife. On 12 February 1955, Alexander married Princess Maria Pia of Savoy, daughter of King Umberto II of Italy and of his wife, Princess Marie José of Belgium. The marriage took place at Cascais in Portugal where the bride's father was living in exile. The couple had met on 22 August 1954 during the royal cruise of the Agamemnon, hosted by King Paul and Queen Frederica of Greece.

Alexander and Maria Pia have twin sons born in 1958:

- Prince Dimitri Umberto Anton Peter Maria of Yugoslavia (born 18 June 1958)
- Prince Michael Nicolas Paul George Maria of Yugoslavia (born 18 June 1958)

Another set of twins was born five years later, this time a girl and a boy:

- Prince Sergius "Serge" Wladimir Emanuel Maria of Yugoslavia (born 12 March 1963); married Sophia de Toledo on 6 November 1985. They divorced in 1986. He was remarried to Eleonora Rajneri on 18 September 2004. He has a child named Umberto Emmanuel Dimitri, with Christiane Galeotti, born in 2018.
- Princess Helene Olga Lydia Tamara Maria of Yugoslavia (born 12 March 1963); married Thierry Gaubert on 12 January 1988. The couple divorced and she remarried to Stanislas Fougeron on 12 March 2018. They live in Château de Villeprévost, the Fougeron family estate acquired by Armand-François Fougeron (1757–1832), advisor to the Kings of France.

Alexander and Maria Pia divorced in 1967, and in 2003 she married Prince Michel of Bourbon-Parma, himself divorced from Princess Yolande de Broglie-Revel.

On 2 November 1973, in a civil ceremony in Paris, Alexander married Princess Barbara Eleonore Marie of Liechtenstein (born 9 July 1942 and a second cousin of Prince Hans-Adam II of Liechtenstein), daughter of Prince Johannes of Liechtenstein and Countess Karoline of Ledebur-Wicheln (aunt of Hans Adam II's late wife Marie, Princess of Liechtenstein). On 28 October 1995 Prince Alexander and Princess Barbara were married in the Orthodox faith in Oplenac, and had issue:

- Prince Dušan Paul of Yugoslavia (born 25 September 1977), married in a civil ceremony Valerie DeMuzio on 3 July 2018 in New York, USA. On 25 May 2019 they were married in the Orthodox faith in Oplenac, Serbia.

== Flying career ==
The Prince wished to serve in the British Royal Air Force during World War Two, but was initially prevented by his father's political affiliations. He was eventually commissioned in the RAF through the intervention of Prince George, Duke of Kent, his uncle. After the war, he sought employment as a pilot joining British European Airways in 1951, and subsequently engaging also in many aeronautic competitions.

== Associations ==
Alexander was one of the four founding members of the Serbian Unity Congress. He was patron of the Center for Research of Orthodox Monarchism.

On 17 February 2008, Alexander issued a statement condemning the declaration of independence by Kosovo.

On the occasion of Prince Alexander's 90th birthday on 13 August 2014, a celebration of his life in words and pictures appeared in that month's UK magazine Majesty.

== Death ==
Prince Alexander died on 12 May 2016 in Paris, where he and his wife had lived for many years. He was buried at Oplenac, Serbia, with his parents and brother, his coffin being carried by Serbian Air Force fighter pilots.

== Ancestry ==
Ancestors of Prince Alexander of Yugoslavia (1924–2016)

8. Alexander Karađorđević, Prince of Serbia
4. Prince Arsen of Yugoslavia
9. Persida Nenadović
2. Paul, Prince Regent of Yugoslavia
10. Pavel Pavlovich Demidov, 2nd Prince of San Donato
5. Princess Aurora Pavlovna Demidova
11. Princess Elena Petrovna Troubetzkaya
1. Prince Alexander of Yugoslavia
12. George I of Greece
6. Prince Nicholas of Greece and Denmark
13. Grand Duchess Olga Constantinovna of Russia
3. Princess Olga of Greece and Denmark
14. Grand Duke Vladimir Alexandrovich of Russia
7. Grand Duchess Elena Vladimirovna of Russia
15. Duchess Marie of Mecklenburg-Schwerin
