= Prince Paul of Yugoslavia =

Regent of Yugoslavia from 1934 to 1941

Paul
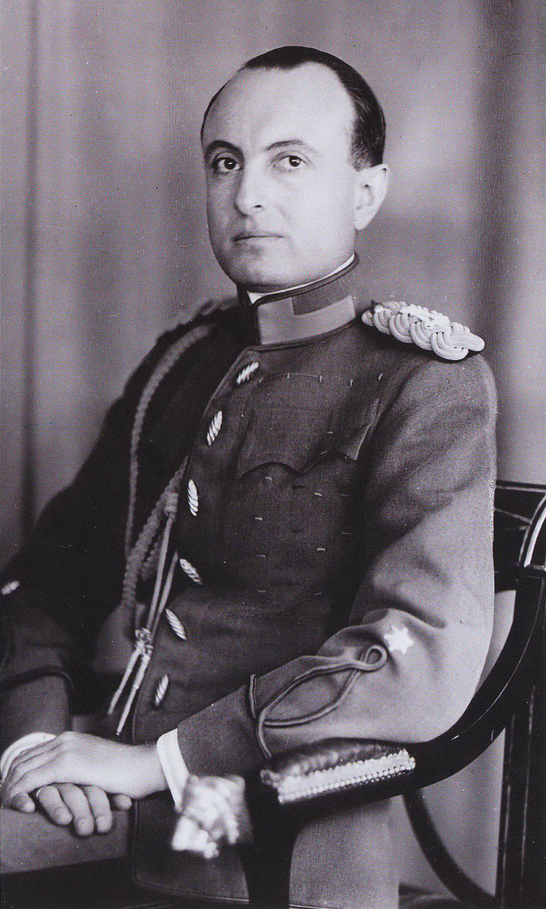
- Prince Paul in 1935

Prince regent of Yugoslavia
- Regency: 9 October 1934 – 27 March 1941
- Monarch: Peter II
- Born: 27 April 1893; Saint Petersburg, Russian Empire
- Died: 14 September 1976 (aged 83); Paris, France
- Burial: Bois-de-Vaux Cemetery, Lausanne, Switzerland (1976–2012); St. George's Church, Oplenac, Serbia (since 2012)
- Spouse: Princess Olga of Greece and Denmark (m. 1923)
- Issue: Prince Alexander; Prince Nicholas; Princess Elizabeth
Names
- Pavle Karađorđević
- House: Karađorđević
- Father: Prince Arsen of Yugoslavia
- Mother: Aurora Pavlovna Demidova
- Military career
- Allegiance: Kingdom of Serbia; Kingdom of Yugoslavia
- Service years: 1911–1935 (active service)
- Rank: Army General
- Units: Cavalry

Styles of Prince Paul of Yugoslavia
- Reference style: His Royal Highness
- Spoken style: Your Royal Highness

Prince Paul of Yugoslavia, also known as Paul Karađorđević (Serbo-Croatian: Павле Карађорђевић, romanized: Pavle Karađorđević, English transliteration: Paul Karageorgevich; 27 April 1893 – 14 September 1976), was prince regent of the Kingdom of Yugoslavia during the minority of King Peter II. Paul was a first cousin of Peter's father, Alexander I.

== Early life ==
Prince Paul of Yugoslavia was the only son of Prince Arsen of Serbia, the younger brother of King Peter I, and of Princess Aurora Pavlovna Demidova. His mother was the eldest granddaughter on one side of the Swedish-speaking Finnish philanthropist Aurora Karamzin and her Russian husband, Prince Pavel Nikolaievich Demidov, and on the other side of the Russian Prince Peter Troubetzkoy and his wife, Elisabeth Esperovna, born Princess Belosselsky-Belozersky.

At the time of Paul's birth, the House of Karađorđević was in exile, as the Serbian throne was held by their rivals, the House of Obrenović. Paul spent his early years in Geneva, where he grew up a lonely and rather neglected child in the household of his uncle, King Peter Karađorđević. Among his relatives, he was affectionately known as “Toto.”

The long and violent feud between the Houses of Karađorđević and Obrenović, which had begun in 1817, came to an end in 1903 when a military coup overthrew and brutally killed King Alexander I and his wife, making the Obrenović line to be extinct. In the aftermath, Peter Karađorđević returned to Serbia to ascend the throne as King Peter I. That same year, young Paul accompanied his uncle to Serbia for the first time.

In 1912, he chose to attend the University of Oxford—a rare decision among the Serbian elite, who typically pursued their studies in either Paris or Saint Petersburg.

Paul was educated at Christ Church, Oxford, where he was a member of the exclusive Bullingdon Club – a dining club notorious for its wealthy members, grand banquets and boisterous rituals. Cultivated like his closest friends Prince George, Duke of Kent, and Sir Henry Channon, his outlook on life was said to be British. Paul often said that he "felt like an Englishman". Channon called Paul "the person I have loved most". For a time, Paul and Channon lived together in a house in London together with another of Channon's lovers Lord Gage. A cultured and easy-going bon vivant who inspired much affection from his friends, Paul when not associating with the British aristocracy collected paintings by Monet, Titian and van Gogh.

In World War I, despite the fact that it was Austria-Hungary that declared war on Serbia on 28 July 1914, Paul only joined the Royal Serbian Army in November 1914, serving for six months before returning to Britain in May 1915. Paul returned to service with the Royal Serbian Army, which was now in exile in Greece in January–April 1917 before again returning to Britain. His military record during both of his tours of duty was described as "undistinguished" as Paul found he was not cut out to be a soldier. Paul argued that he could be at most service to Serbia by being in London, where he served as a lobbyist for Serbia.

Paul lived in London from 1919 to 1924 and only infrequently visited Belgrade. During his time in London, he was the proverbial "life of the party" who enjoyed socialising with the British elite at parties in London or in various country houses. On October 22, 1923, he married Princess Olga of Greece and Denmark, a sister of Princess Marina, Duchess of Kent. The Duke of York (the future King George VI), was the best man at his wedding in Belgrade. In January 1924, he returned to Yugoslavia. Paul's cousin, King Alexander, seemed to have had in mind installing him in some sort of vice-regal position in Zagreb to govern the Croats; Alexander enjoyed Paul's company, finding him to be a witty conversationalist with a "breadth of vision" and a "cool intellect". However, the king decided that Paul was too sympathetic towards Croat complaints about the unitary state created by the 1921 Vidovdan Constitution, and decided not to give him the vice-regal position, much to Paul's frustration.

Though careful never to openly criticise the constitution, Paul sympathised with the Croat demand to turn Yugoslavia into a federation, and felt that many Serb politicians were being unrealistic in expecting that Croat discontent would just dissolve of its own accord if given enough time. Paul found his palace at Dedinje to be gloomy, causing him to relocate to a villa in Slovenia, where he felt more at home, and where he took up his time with his ever expanding art collection and raising his family. Besides collecting art, Paul's interests were reading, fishing and hunting. Whenever there was a major art show in London, Paris, Munich, Florence, Rome and Vienna, Paul almost invariably was present both to admire the art and purchase paintings for his collection.

== Appointment as Regent of Yugoslavia ==
The standard of the Prince Regent

On 9 October 1934, a Bulgarian assassin named Vlado Chernozemski, a member of the IMRO and the Croatian fascist and ultranationalist Ustaše party, assassinated Paul's first-cousin, King Alexander I of Yugoslavia, in Marseille, France, and Prince Paul became the regent, as Alexander had stipulated in his will that on his death a regency council chaired by Paul should govern until Alexander's son, King Peter II came of age. Late on the afternoon of 9 October, Paul received a telephone call with the news that king had been assassinated, and that he was to go to the royal palace at once. Alexander had survived two previous assassination attempts, and had hinted that if he should die, that Paul was to serve as regent. Upon arriving at the royal palace, Paul was met by the prime minister, Nikola Uzunović, and the commander of the Royal Guard, General Petar Živković. The three men opened up the safe that contained the royal will whose terms stated that Paul was to serve as the regent until the new king Peter II came of age in September 1941.

Prince Paul, far more than Alexander, was Yugoslav rather than Serb in outlook, and unlike Alexander, he was inclined much more toward democracy. In its broadest outline, his domestic policy worked to eliminate the heritage of the Alexandrine dictatorship's centralism, censorship, and military control, and to pacify the country by solving the Serb-Croat problem. Paul wanted to achieve a Serb-Croat reconciliation, but also felt for a considerable period of time that he had the duty to hand over the kingdom to Peter more or less unchanged when he reached his maturity, and thus was unwilling to entertain constitutional changes. Trifković wrote that: "By both instinct and personal development, Pavle was averse both to autocratic rule and militarism."

As Prince Regent, Paul possessed very broad powers, but he was much less inclined to exercise these powers, leading Yugoslavia in the years 1934–41 to be labelled "a dictatorship without a dictator". Paul had been thrust into a position of power that he did not want by Alexander's assassination (which was why Alexander had chosen him in his will to serve as a regent, knowing he would never try to seize the throne from his son), and throughout his regency he gave the impression that ruling Yugoslavia was a burden to him.

A French diplomat described Paul as a man whose "incontestable qualities of character, balance, and taste... Oxonian dilettantism and charm, which he exercised on his visitors, were useless in the present circumstances and in a country where arguments of might are the only ones which count". British historian D. C. Watt noted that Paul's "nerves tended to betray him under stress and that he was by nature inclined to yield to pressure rather than withstand it". Married to a Greek princess and intensely Anglophile and Hellenophile, Paul distrusted Fascist Italy and Nazi Germany.

The heavy losses taken by Serbia in World War I made Paul very averse to engaging in another war and led him to favoring neutralist policies despite Yugoslavia's alliance with France. During the First World War, Serbia had proportionally taken the heaviest losses; one out of five Serbs who were alive in 1914 were dead by 1918. The French police investigation of King Alexander's assassination had established firm evidence that the assassins had been armed by the governments of Italy and Hungary, which was shared with Yugoslavia. Furthermore, the forged Czechoslovak passports that had allowed the assassins to travel to France had come from Hungary, and the assassins had telephoned Ante Pavelić, who was living in Rome at the time. However, the French premier Pierre Laval-who was seeking an alliance with Italy-made it very clear to Paul that France would not support Yugoslavia if it chose to make an issue of Italian involvement in the assassination of the king, saying that the most Yugoslavia could do was to blame Hungary. The way that the French were prepared to disregard Yugoslav concerns about the regicide for the sake of better relations with Italy soured Paul on the French alliance.

== Stojadinović years ==
On 24 June 1935, Paul appointed Milan Stojadinović as prime minister, with a mandate to deal with the Great Depression and find a solution to the "Croat question". Stojadinović believed that the solution to the Great Depression were closer economic ties with Germany, which had more people than what it could feed and lacked many of the raw materials necessary for a modern industrial economy. As Germany needed both food and raw materials such as iron, bauxite, copper and manganese, Yugoslav exports of both agricultural products and of minerals to the Reich bloomed from 1935 onward, leading to an economic revival and to placing Yugoslavia in the German economic sphere of influence.

Yugoslavia had signed a treaty of alliance with France in 1927, while the Rhineland was still occupied by France, and during Franco-Yugoslav staff talks, it was promised that France would take the offensive into western Germany if Germany should start another war. As long as the Rhineland remained a demilitarized zone, there was always the possibility of the French launching an offensive into western Germany, which reassured Yugoslavia. The American historian Gerhard Weinberg wrote that the demilitarized status of the Rhineland the Treaty of Versailles had imposed was "the single most important guarantee of peace in Europe" for as long as the Rhineland was demilitarized, it was impossible for Germany to attack any of France's allies in Eastern Europe without exposing itself to the risk of a devastating French offensive into western Germany.

The remilitarization of the Rhineland on 7 March 1936 meant that Germany started building the West Wall along its border with France, which ended any hope of a French offensive into western Germany. On 15–20 June 1936, the chiefs of staff of the Little Entente (Romania, Czechoslovakia and Yugoslavia) met in Bucharest to discuss their plans now that the Rhineland was re-militarized. The gloomy conclusion of the Bucharest meeting was that France was not a factor in Eastern Europe, and henceforward there were only two great powers in Eastern Europe, namely the Soviet Union and Germany, and the victory of either in another war would mean the end of their independence.

Despite his pro-British and pro-French feelings, Paul believed in the aftermath of the remilitarization of the Rhineland that Yugoslavia needed to tilt its foreign policy towards Germany. Likewise, the Hoare–Laval Pact of 1935 and British attempts to improve Anglo-Italian relations such as the "Gentlemen's Agreement" of 1937 and the Easter Accords of 1938 caused Paul to believe the British were willing to sacrifice Yugoslavia for the sake of better relations with Italy. Stojadinović, who openly admired Fascist Italy and Nazi Germany, made a major diplomatic push with the tacit support of the Prince Regent for better relations with the fascist states in the winter of 1936–37.

Without informing France, Czechoslovakia or Romania, Stojadinović signed an agreement with Italy on 25 March 1937 that badly weakened the Little Entente. Just before Stojadinović had signed the treaty, Paul let the British minister in Belgrade, Ronald Campbell, know of what was being planned. Paul seems to have believed that if Yugoslavia was seen as falling within the Italian sphere of influence, that might prompt a British response to pull Yugoslavia in the other direction. The agreements with Italy very much alarmed the French who sent out General Maurice Gamelin to visit Belgrade in September 1937, followed by the Foreign Minister Yvon Delbos in December 1937, who in both cases sought reassurances that Yugoslavia was not abandoning its alliance with France. Stojadinović's foreign policies were unpopular, at least with the Serbs. When President Edvard Beneš of Czechoslovakia visited Belgrade, he was greeted by enthusiastic crowds cheering him, which was seen as a sign that public opinion was still attached to the traditional alliances. Stojadinović, supported by Paul, believed that an Anglo-German rapprochement was the best way to save the peace, accepting that an international order established by the Treaty of Versailles was doomed, and that the best way of saving the peace would be to make concessions to the Reich without letting Germany dominate Europe too much. At a Little Entente summit at King Carol II's summer residence at Sinaia in August 1937, Paul and Stojadinović pressed Beneš to end Czechoslovakia's alliance with the Soviet Union, complaining it upset the Germans too much. At the same time, Yugoslav diplomats tried to effect a German-Czechoslovak rapprochement, telling the Germans that Beneš had only signed the alliance with the Soviet Union out of fear, and suggested that if the Germans stopped making threats against Czechoslovakia, then perhaps Beneš could be persuaded to abrogate the alliance. Though Paul had supported Stojadinović up to this point, in about late 1937 he started to express concern about the prime minister who spoke of having Yugoslavia join the Axis powers as he felt that Stojadinović was alienating Yugoslavia's traditional allies too much.

During the Sudetenland crisis, Stojadinović leaned in a pro-Axis position while Campbell reported that much of the Yugoslav officer corps sympathized with Yugoslavia's ally Czechoslovakia, and implied that a coup d'état was possible if Stojadinović declared neutrality. Terence Shone, the first secretary at the British legation in Belgrade reported that Serbian public opinion was very pro-Czechoslovak and expected Yugoslavia to go to war if its ally were attacked. Paul was described as being relieved by the Munich Agreement, which seemed, at least for the moment, to end the possibility of a war that would have placed his country in a dilemma.

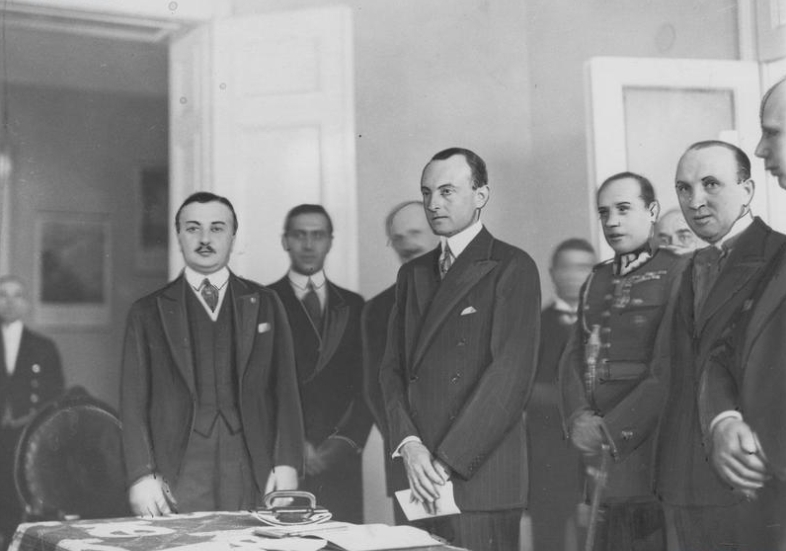
Prince Paul at the Edward Okuń exhibition in 1932

In January 1939, Stojadinović had told the Italian Foreign Minister Count Galeazzo Ciano of his wish to turn his Yugoslav Radical Union into the only legal party, saying he wanted to establish a fascist dictatorship that carried out a pro-Italian foreign policy "to find a balanced situation and security within the framework of the Axis". Stojadinović and Ciano discussed the possibility of dividing up Albania, a plan immediately vetoed by Paul who complained that in his opinion Yugoslavia already had too many Albanians (whose loyalty to Yugoslavia was questionable) and adding more would be unhelpful. At the same time, the Croat deputies in the skupshtina (parliament) called on foreign powers to intervene to give the Croats "liberty of choice and destiny", accusing Stojadinović of being a tyrant.

== Danzig crisis: countdown to war ==
On 4 February 1939, Paul dismissed Stojadinović as prime minister and at that point the Yugoslav tilt towards the Axis was stopped. After dismissing Stojadinović, Paul rejected an Italian appeal to support the Italian annexation of Albania. On 15 March 1939, Germany occupied the Czech half of the rump state of Czecho-Slovakia (as Czechoslovakia had been renamed in October 1938), turning it into the Protectorate of Bohemia and Moravia. The fact that the Reich extinguished the independence of Czecho-Slovakia despite the way in which Emil Hácha and the rest of the leaders had endeavoured to carry out a slavishly pro-German foreign policy, came as a considerable shock to Paul.

Later, when the Italians annexed Albania on Easter weekend 1939, Paul declined to make a protest, which severely strained relations with Yugoslavia's Balkan Pact ally Turkey, which protested most vehemently against the annexation of a Muslim-majority nation with which the Turks had historically close ties. The Italian annexation of Albania led to Italy controlling both sides of the Strait of Otranto, and thus allowed the Italians to cut Yugoslavia off from access to the rest of the world. On 12 May 1939, Britain and Turkey issued a joint declaration promising "to ensure the establishment of security in the Balkans". As Paul was about to make a state visit to Italy, he found the statement from the Turkish ambassador in Belgrade suggesting that Yugoslavia work with Turkey in the spirit of the Anglo-Turkish declaration to resist any further Italian advances in the Balkans very poorly timed and made it clear that he wanted nothing to do with the Turkish proposal.

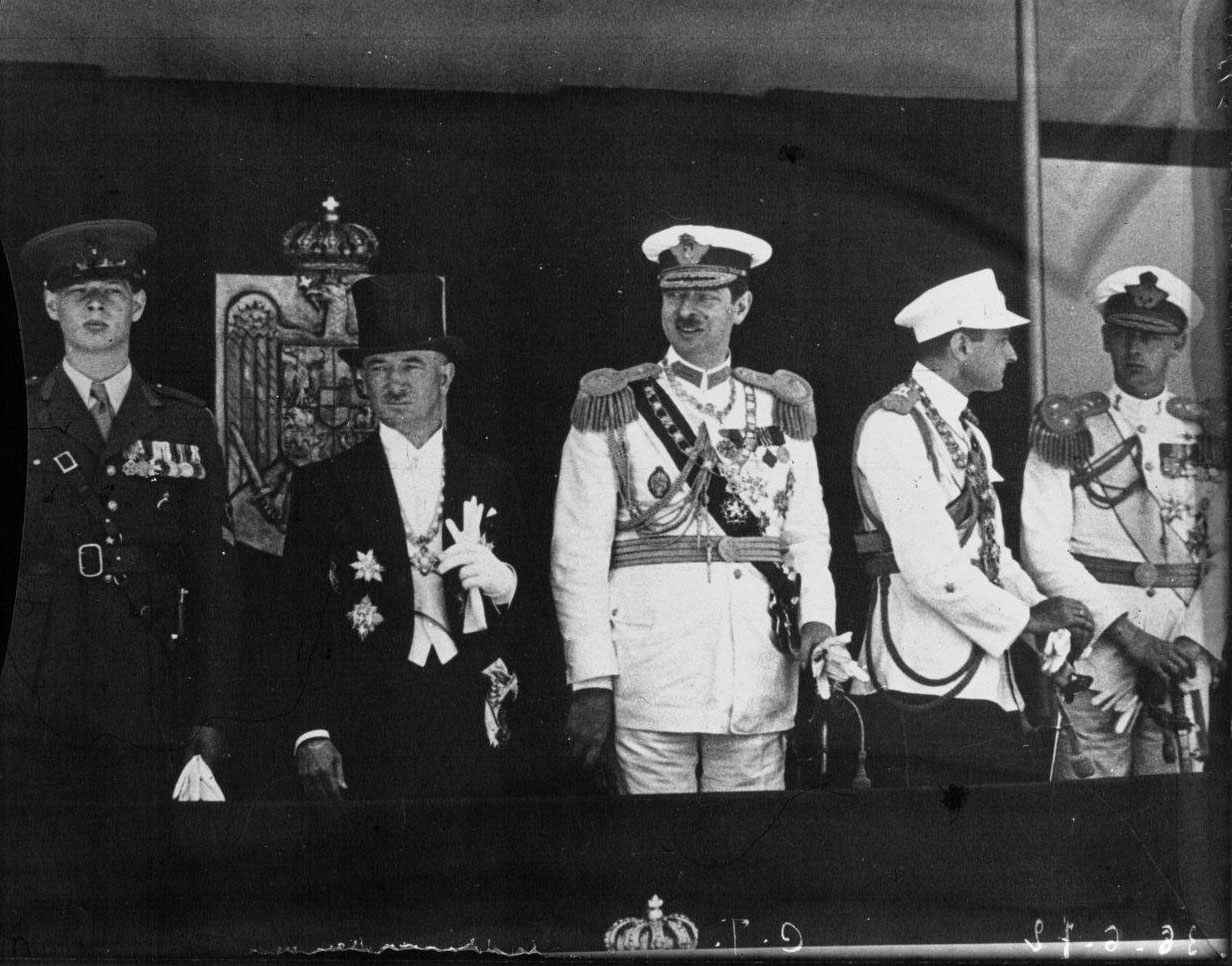
King Carol II of Romania, Czechoslovak president Edvard Beneš, Crown Prince Michael of Romania, Yugoslav regent Prince Paul, and Prince Nicholas of Romania in Bucharest in 1936

Paul backed a plan floated by Turkish Foreign Minister Şükrü Saracoğlu for Bulgaria to join the Balkan Pact and, in a letter, urged King Carol II of Romania to cede part of the Dobruja region as the price of Bulgaria joining the Balkan Pact. In his letter, Paul stressed the importance of stopping Italy from invading more Balkan nations, which required getting the Bulgarians out of the Italian sphere of influence (King Boris III of Bulgaria was married to the daughter of King Victor Emmanuel III of Italy). He wrote that he wanted the Bulgarians "off my back" to allow the Yugoslavs and Greeks to focus on countering the Italians, who were now building up their forces in their new colony of Albania. Unlike the Hungarians, whom Paul felt would never abandon their claims against Yugoslavia, the Bulgarians were felt to be more tractable.

After Germany and Italy, Hungary was the nation that Paul worried about the most as he noted that Danube river valley ran down from the Hungarian plain straight to Belgrade. At the same time, Yugoslavia began staff talks with Greece with the aim of resisting an Italian invasion of either nation. A major problem for Yugoslavia was the lack of modern weapons together with the money to pay for them. Watt wrote that "Paul's tactics were aimed at winning credits and securing arms deliveries wherever he could, in Berlin, Paris or London". After talking to Raymond Brugère, the French minister in Belgrade, the latter promised the prince regent that he would fly to Paris personally to lobby for Yugoslavia.

On 29 June 1939, it was that announced that the Bank Seligmann of Paris was going to make a loan of 600 million francs to Yugoslavia that was to be spent on weapons for the Yugoslav military. The Germans had broken the Yugoslav diplomatic codes and were well aware of Paul's attempts to play off the Axis powers against the Allied powers to secure the best deal for Yugoslavia; Paul's salvation in 1939 rested with the fact that Germany was about to invade Poland and needed raw materials from Yugoslavia like bauxite and copper to keep the German armaments industry going. After Hitler had the decision to launch Fall Weiss (Case White), the invasion of Poland, the Reich wanted two things from Yugoslavia, namely an agreement to supply Germany with all the necessary raw materials and that Yugoslavia not only refuse to join the British-inspired "peace front" but also formally aligned its diplomacy with the Axis powers.

In 1939, Prince Paul, as acting head of state, accepted an official invitation from Adolf Hitler and spent nine days in Berlin. During his visit to Berlin, a massive effort was made to persuade Paul to not join the "peace front" that was meant to "contain" Germany. Paul was greeted by Hitler at the train station in Berlin, was made the guest of honor at a reception and dinner at the Reich Chancellery, visited the Potsdam military base, saw a gala performance of Wagner at the Berlin opera, and reviewed two major military parades meant to impress upon him the power of the Reich. For the first part of his trip, Paul stayed at Bellevue Palace, an old imperial palace and then for the last three days, at Göring's estate at Carinhall. Despite all the pomp, Paul during his visit to Germany repeatedly refused the demands made by his hosts to sign an economic agreement that would have turned Yugoslavia into a German economic colony or some overt pro-Axis gesture like pulling Yugoslavia out of the League of Nations and signing the Anti-Comintern Pact. The German foreign minister Joachim von Ribbentrop called Paul a "log" (a German slang term meaning somebody who is very stupid) while Hitler was very angry that despite all the lavish hospitality the only concession Paul made was to slightly readjust the exchange rate between the Reichsmark and the Dinar. In return for readjusting the exchange rate, Paul forced the Germans to finally deliver some of the aircraft that Yugoslavia had paid for in advance in 1938, but the Germans kept finding excuses not to deliver.

While he was in Germany, Paul dispatched General Petar Pešić on a secret mission to Paris and London to find out what were the Anglo-French plans in the event of a war. Pešić told Lord Gort of the British General Staff and French General Maurice Gamelin that Yugoslavia would declare neutrality if Germany invaded Poland but would be willing to enter the war for the Allies the moment that the Mediterranean Sea and the Adriatic Sea came under Allied operational control. Pešić argued that from the Allied viewpoint that Yugoslav neutrality could be advantageous in the sense that Yugoslavia at present could not stop the German Wehrmacht from occupying the country if Hitler so desired, which would allow the Germans to exploit all of the crucial raw materials of Yugoslavia, but if Yugoslavia remained neutral and entered the war when the Allies could support it, then raw materials would be permanently denied to the Germans.

Pešić found that the French, who preferred that fighting take place anywhere but France, were far more interested in having Yugoslavia enter the conflict if the Danzig Crisis led to a war than were the British. From Gamelin, he learned the French were already planning on having the Army of the Levant commanded by Maxime Weygand land at Thessaloniki to march up the Balkans to link up with the Yugoslavs and the Romanians to aid the Poles. In May 1939, Yugoslavia changed its diplomatic codes, which stopped both the Italians and Germans from reading the Yugoslav codes. The same month, when Romanian Foreign Minister Grigore Gafencu visited Belgrade, Paul spoke to him of his wish for both Yugoslavia and Romania to have closer ties with Britain.

Despite repeated pressure from both the German and Italian ministers in Belgrade, Paul refused their demand for Yugoslavia to leave the League of Nations as a symbolic move to show that Yugoslavia was now associated with the Axis states. As Germany and Japan had both left the League of Nations in 1933 while Italy had left the League in 1937, the Axis powers always attached immense symbolic importance to having other nations leaving the League as showing diplomatic alignment with them.

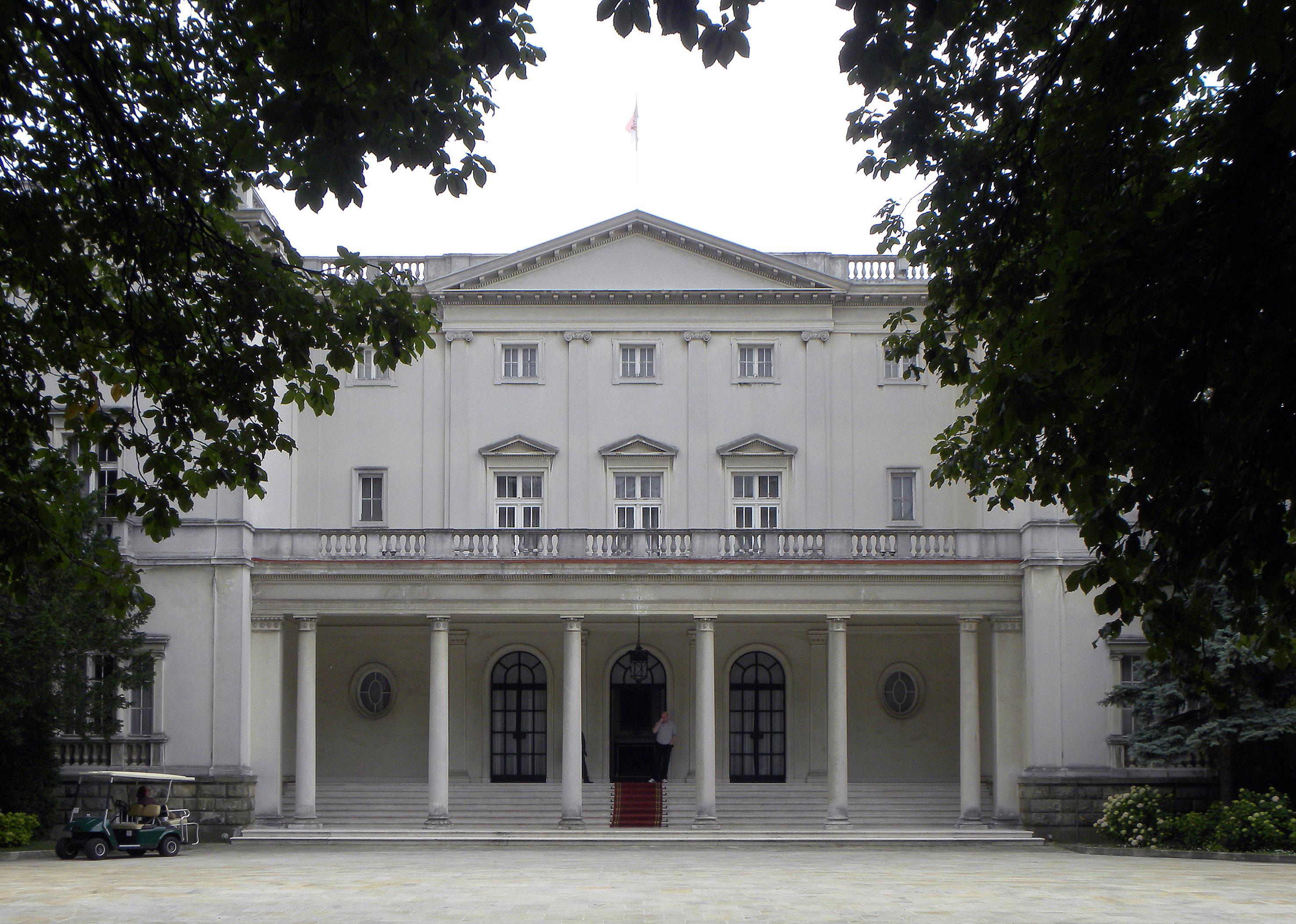
Beli dvor in Belgrade, Paul's residence

In June 1939, Paul warned the American ambassador to Yugoslavia that the Forschungsamt (research office – German cryptanalytic intelligence agency) was reading all of the diplomatic cables going into and out of Belgrade, including the American ones, and the ambassador should be careful what information he cabled back to Washington, DC. On 15 July 1939, Paul left Belgrade to visit London with a stop over in Paris to see Pešić.

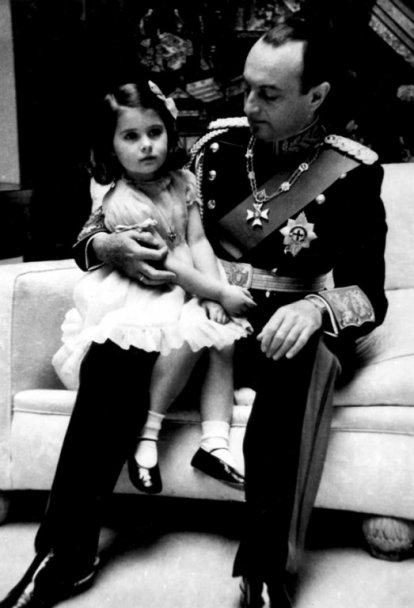
Prince Paul with his daughter, Princess Elizabeth

From Pešić, Paul learned that he had the impression that on one hand, the French were keen to start a second front in the Balkans in the event of war while on the other hand that the French Navy would play only a defensive role, guarding convoys from Algeria to France. In London, Paul advocated that Britain launch a "preemptive war" against Italy, saying that if Italy were knocked out, then Yugoslavia would definitely move closer to Britain. Paul ordered that the National Bank of Yugoslavia's gold reserves be transferred to London as a sign of his faith in Britain.

He told his British hosts that Yugoslavia was not ready to join the "peace front" yet but was moving in that direction. Paul also told Foreign Secretary Lord Halifax that Paul would use his influence with the more hesitant Balkan Pact nations, Romania and Greece, to try to bring them into the "peace front". During the same visit, he was installed as a Stranger Knight Companion of the Garter, the most important British order of chivalry, by King George VI, which greatly offended Hitler, who complained that Paul's heart was with the British. During his talks with Lord Halifax in London, Paul received elusive replies to his demands for a British "preemptive war" against Italy as Paul contended that as long as the Regia Marina existed, there was always the possibility of Yugoslavia being cut off from Britain and France. Both Prime Minister Neville Chamberlain and Lord Halifax regarded Italian Prime Minister Benito Mussolini as the more moderate and reasonable of the fascist leaders and that, despite signing the Pact of Steel in May, he might still be "peeled off" from his alliance with Germany. Paul's fears of the Regia Marina were confirmed in June 1940 when Italy entered the war and caused the British to start supplying Egypt via the long way around Africa on the Cape of Good Hope route as the danger of Italian air and naval attacks made crossing the central Mediterranean too dangerous, the only exception being supply convoys for Malta.

Fearful of being cut off, Paul advocated to Halifax that if Britain ended up declaring war on Germany as a result of the latter invading Poland, then Britain should immediately launch air and naval attacks to destroy the Regia Marina and the Regia Aeronautica regardless if Italy was neutral or not. It was Paul's belief that even if Mussolini declared neutrality at first, he would inevitably come into the war on Germany's side at some point. Paul very much wanted an Anglo-French landing at the Greek city of Thessaloniki in the event of war, as he believed that to be the only way that Yugoslavia could resist a German invasion. Paul also expressed his hope that the British would include the Soviet Union the proposed "peace front" as the best way of deterring Germany from invading Poland. While Paul was visiting London, Yugoslav Finance Minister Vojin Đuričić was in Paris and signed there on 14 July an agreement with Prime Minister Édouard Daladier for France to sell Yugoslavia anti-aircraft guns, trucks, howitzers, anti-tank guns, machine guns, tanks and tank transporters.

As the Danzig Crisis pushed Europe to the brink of war, Vladko Maček of the Croatian Peasant Party became convinced of the necessity of "throwing a bridge across the abyss which separated Serb from Croat". Paul supported Prime Minister Dragiša Cvetković's efforts to reach an understanding with Maček, despite his wish to hand over Yugoslavia unchanged to King Peter when he reached his majority, since Paul felt that an end to the Serb-Croat dispute was the best way to allow Yugoslavia to survive the coming storm. On 20 August 1939, the Cvetković-Maček Agreement set up the Banovina of Croatia to be ruled by a ban (governor) responsible to the king and a sabor (parliament) in Zagreb. The central government retained control of the monarchy, foreign affairs, national defence, foreign trade, commerce, transport, public security, religion, mining, weights and measures, insurance and education policy, but Croatia was to have its own legislature in Zagreb with a separate budget. The sporazum (agreement) granted broad autonomy to Croatia, and partitioned Bosnia and Herzegovina as the government agreed to Maček's demand for all of the Croats in Yugoslavia to live under the authority of the Croatian banovina. The sporazum was popular with moderate Croat opinion, but it was extremely unpopular with the Bosnian Muslims, who objected to the partition of Bosnia-Herzegovina. Likewise, Serbs were outraged by that the sporazum had "abandoned" the prečani Serbs in Bosnia and the Krajina region to Croat rule. The charge that Paul and Cvetković had "sold out" to the Croats with the sporazum made them unpopular with the Serbs, and if it did not cause the Yugoslav coup d'état of 26 March 1941, it certainly was an essential prerequisite for the coup. Finally, the Slovenes demanded for a similar degree of autonomy to be granted to them.

On 26 August 1939, as the Danzig Crisis moved towards its climax, Paul, in a letter to Lord Halifax, once again urged that Britain launch a "preemptive war" against Italy if Germany invaded Poland. Paul warned if Germany conquered Poland, Italy would sooner or later enter the war, and if that happened, the Italian forces in Albania with support from Bulgaria would be used to threaten the other Balkan states. Paul concluded in that case "a rot throughout the Balkans" would follow as the other Balkan states together with Turkey would turn towards Germany to protect them from Italy. Sir Ronald Campbell, the British minister in Belgrade, in a cable to Lord Halifax wrote that Paul was "in the last stages of despair". Halifax wrote on the margin on Paul's letter that he was suffering from manic-depression again. Brugère, who very much liked Paul, proved more sympathetic and, in a dispatch to Paris, urged for France to land a force at Thessaloniki if Germany invaded Poland. The French proved supportive of the idea of landing at Thessaloniki, but Allied strategy was determined by an Inter-Allied War Council, and the British were stoutly opposed to the French plans for a "second front" in the Balkans. The news of the Ribbentrop-Molotov Pact was an especially bitter blow for Paul, as it ensured that the two strongest powers in Eastern Europe would be working together, and it ended the regent's hopes of an Anglo-French alliance, which might finally rid Yugoslavia of the constant Italian efforts to undermine national unity.

== Second World War ==
When the Second World War broke out in September 1939 by the German invasion of Poland, Yugoslavia declared its neutrality. During the Phoney War, Paul arranged for Yugoslavia to step up deliveries of copper to Germany in exchanges for promises that Germany would finally deliver arms that Yugoslavia had paid for in advance but for which Germany kept finding excuses not to deliver. Germany also wanted Yugoslavia to refuse to join the British-inspired "peace front" and even for it to align its diplomacy formally with the Axis powers. In his sympathies, Paul preferred for France and Britain to win the war, but he was markedly afraid of the Wehrmacht. Paul repeatedly pressed for a revival of the Salonika Front strategy of First World War by arguing that if French and British forces landed at Thessaloniki, which would place them in a position to aid Yugoslavia, he might lean more towards the Allies. During the Phoney War, a popular if erroneous rumour in Croatia that Paul was planning to enter the war on the Allied side and send Croat regiments to man the Maginot Line in France increased support for Croat separatism.

Such was Paul's desperation for a counterbalance to Germany that he even turned towards the Soviet Union. Vasily Strandtman, the Russian chargé d'affaires at the legation in Belgrade in 1914, finally closed the legation in October 1939 under strong pressure from the Yugoslav government. In May 1940, an economic agreement was signed with the Soviet Union, and in June 1940, Yugoslavia finally established diplomatic relations with Moscow, being one of the last European states to recognize the Soviet Union. In December 1940 and again in March 1941, Paul attempted to have Yugoslavia buy modern military equipment from the Soviet Union.

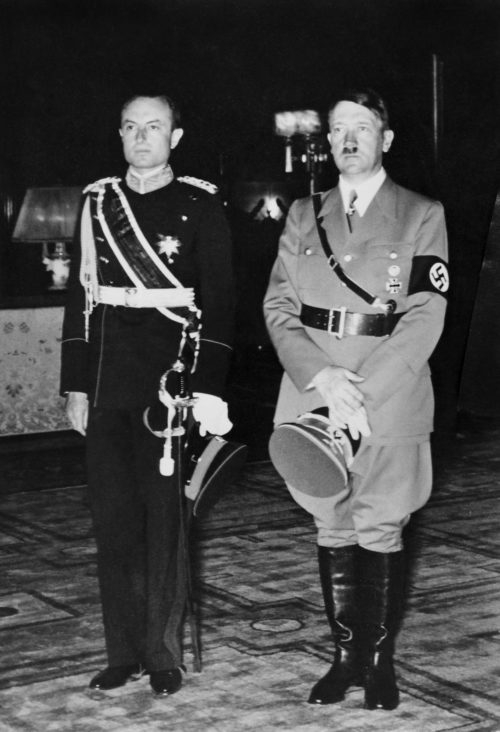
Prince Paul Karađorđević of Yugoslavia and Adolf Hitler leader of Nazi Germany, Berlin, 1939.

On 4 March 1941, Paul met with Adolf Hitler at the Berghof high up in the Bavarian Alps. Hitler told Paul that he already decided to invade Greece and in exchange for the Wehrmacht being granted transit rights through Yugoslavia was willing to assign Thessaloniki to Yugoslavia after the expected conquest of Greece. Paul refused the offer and said that as his wife was Greek, he could not permit Yugoslavia to be used as a base for aggression against Greece. Paul also admitted that his sympathies were with Britain and stated to sign the Tripartite Pact would lead to his overthrow. General Franz Halder, the chief of the Germany Army Staff who attended the meeting, wrote in his diary: "No positive results. No intention to join the Tripartite Pact". On 6 March 1941, Paul called a meeting of the Yugoslav Crown Council at which Pešić stated his opinion as a soldier that the Royal Yugoslav Army could not stop a German invasion, and the best that could be hoped for was to hold out for six weeks in the mountains of Bosnia. The next day, Yugoslav Foreign Minister Aleksandar Cincar-Marković approached Victor von Heeren, the German minister in Belgrade, and said that Yugoslavia was willing to sign the Tripartite Pact if no transit rights allowing the Wehrmacht to invade Greece from Yugoslavia were granted and said that Paul could not in good conscience allow Yugoslavia to be used as a base for war against his wife's homeland.

On 25 March 1941, the Yugoslav government signed the Axis Tripartite Pact with significant reservations, as three notes were appended. The first note obliged the Axis powers to respect the territorial integrity and sovereignty of Yugoslavia. In the second note, the Axis powers promised not to ask Yugoslavia for any military assistance, and in the third note, they promised not to ask permission to move military forces across Yugoslav territory during the war. Nonetheless, the signing of the pact did not sit well with several elements of the Royal Yugoslav Army. On 27 March 1941, two days after Yugoslavia had signed the Tripartite Pact, Yugoslav military figures with British support forcibly removed Paul from power and declared King Peter II of age. German and Italian forces invaded the country ten days later.

== Exile ==
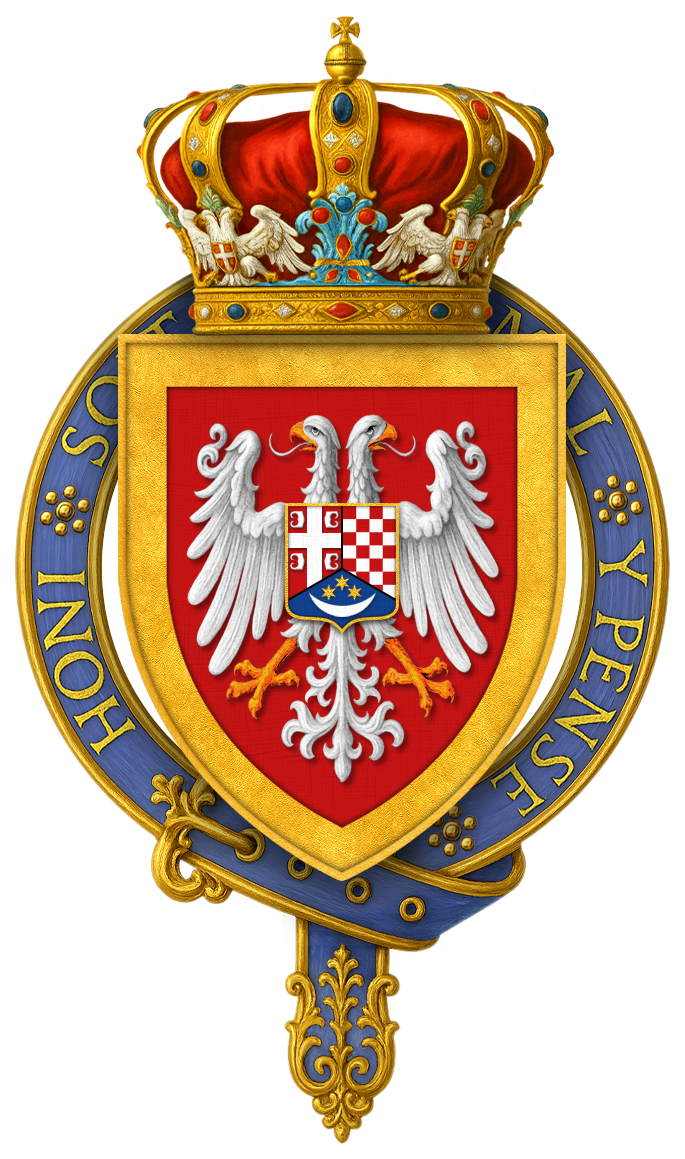
Paul's coat of arms with Order of the Garter

For the remainder of the war, Prince Paul was kept, with his family, under house arrest by the British in Kenya. Paul and his family arrived at Oserian, the former home of Lord Erroll on the shores of Lake Naivasha on 28 April 1941. Oserian was in a state of disrepair as the earl had been murdered earlier in 1941 and Princess Olga called it "a complete nightmare". Paul and his family were under house arrest, being forbidden to leave the grounds of the Oserian. British newspapers depicted Paul as a Nazi sympathizer, despite his Anglophile tendencies.

His sister-in-law, the Duchess of Kent, and her husband, the Duke of Kent, appealed to Winston Churchill in the hope of allowing Paul and his wife, Princess Olga, to take refuge in Britain. However, Churchill rejected the request in no uncertain manner since he viewed Paul as a traitor and war criminal. After the Duke of Kent's death in 1942, Churchill relented to King George's insistence and allowed Olga to fly to London to comfort her sister but without her husband, who had been extremely close to the late Duke. One of Paul's old friends, the South African Prime Minister, Jan Smuts, lobbied Churchill to release Paul, who was finally freed in 1944 and was allowed to settle in Johannesburg. Smuts granted Paul and his family asylum. Smuts lost the 1948 South African general election to D. F. Malan of the National Party, which was less sympathetic towards Paul being in South Africa.

Paul lived in South Africa until 1949, when he moved to Paris. Paul always spent his summers at his villa in Tuscany, the Villa Demidoff, where his neighbor was his old friend, the wealthy American art historian and art dealer, Bernard Berenson. Berenson had long maintained his home at his Tuscan villa, I Tatti. As Berenson was one of the richest and most influential figures in the art world, Paul was able to continue adding to his art collection. The British art historian John Pope-Hennessy, who once had lunch with Berenson and Paul, wrote: "I found Princess Olga's guttural manner rather disconcerting, but Prince Paul I liked from the beginning".

The postwar Communist authorities in Yugoslavia had Prince Paul proclaimed an enemy of the state, barred him from ever returning to Yugoslavia and confiscated all of his property in Yugoslavia.

Prince Paul was the father of Princess Elizabeth, Prince Alexander, and Prince Nikola, and was the grandfather of the American author Christina Oxenberg and American actress Catherine Oxenberg.

== Burial ==
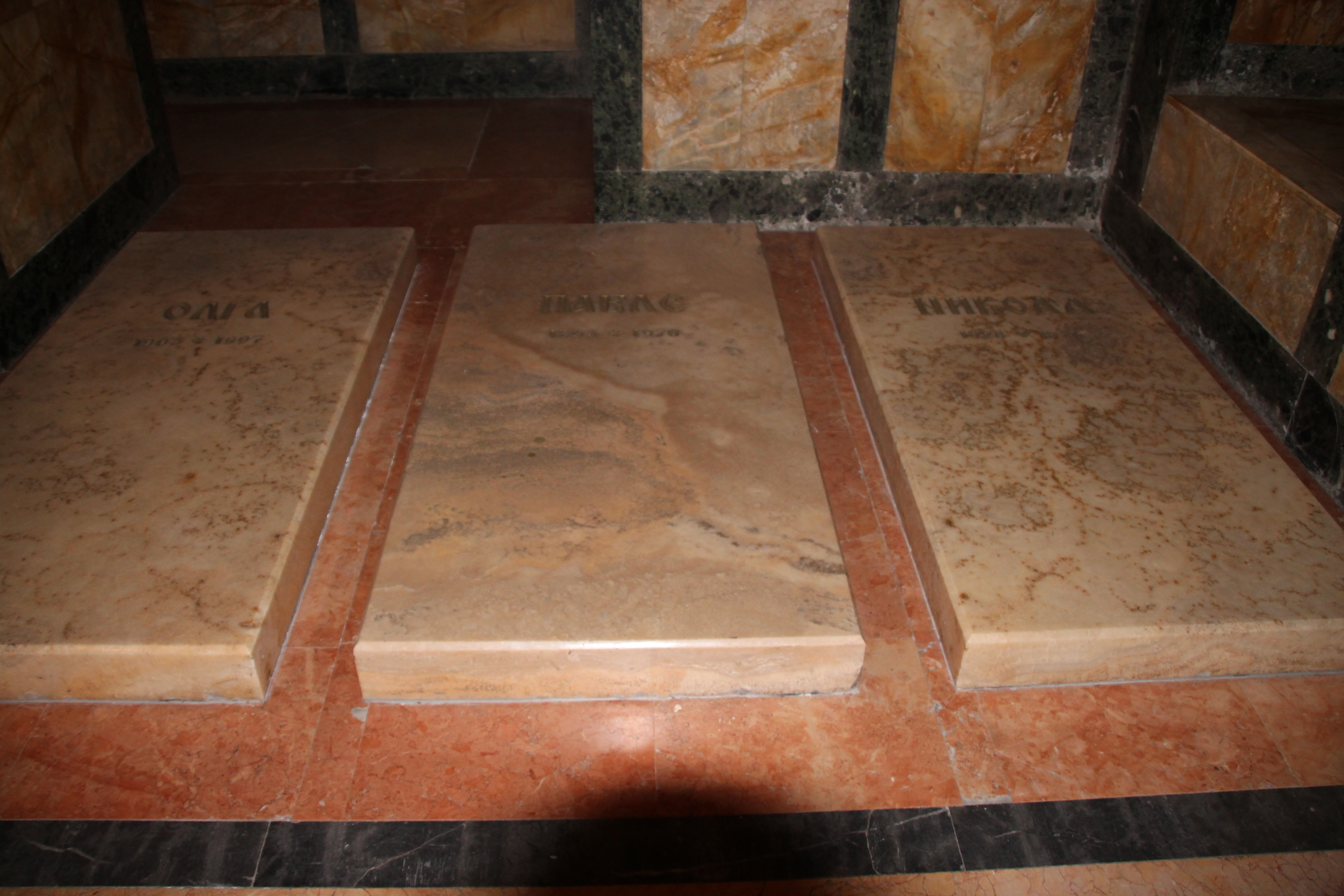
Tombs of Princess Olga, Prince Paul and Prince Nikola in the Karađorđević family vault at St. George's Church in Oplenac

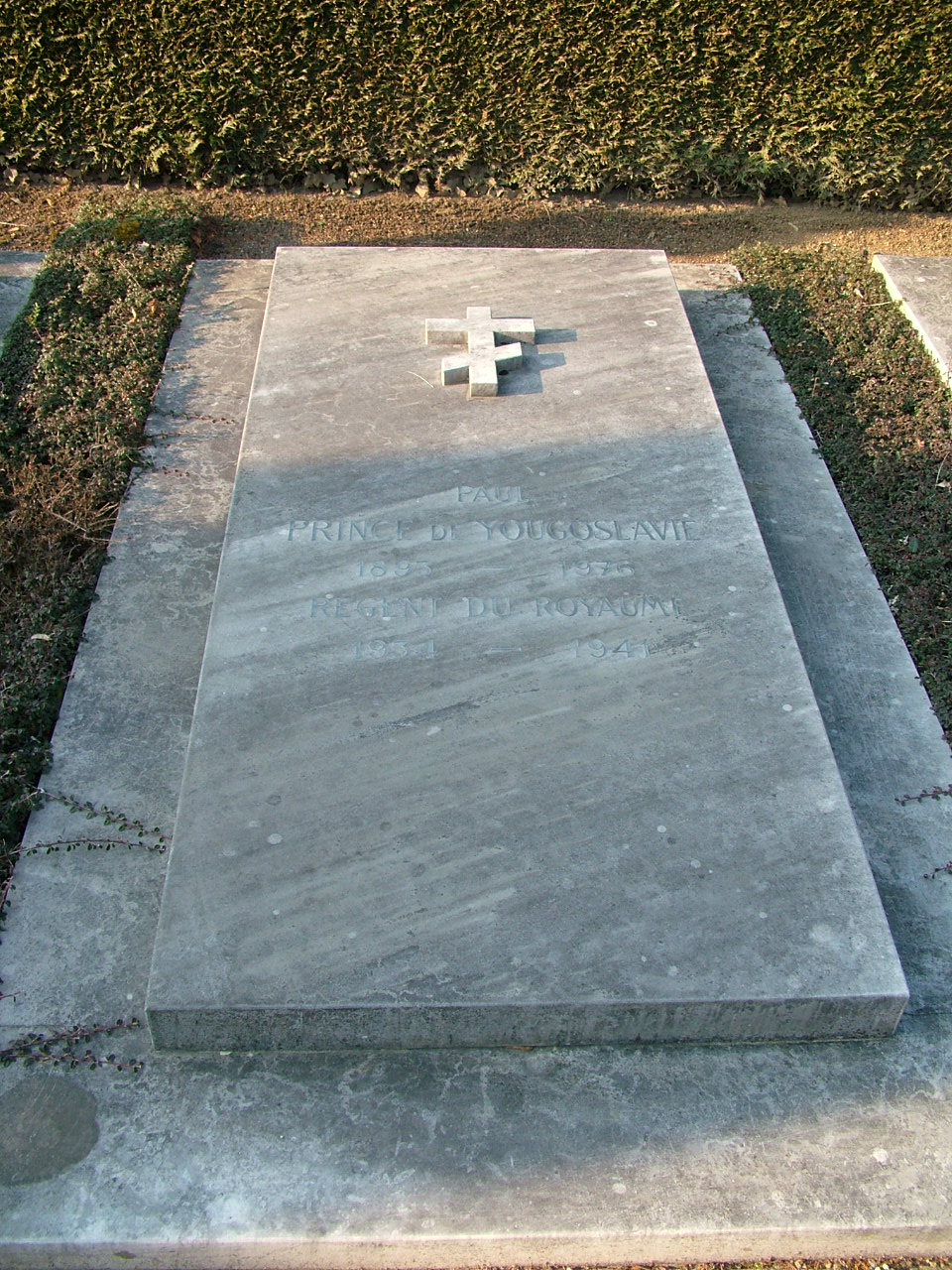
Former grave (1976–2012) of Prince Paul in Lausanne

Prince Paul died in Paris on 14 September 1976, aged 83 and was buried at the Bois-de-Vaux Cemetery in Lausanne, Switzerland.

Prince Paul was rehabilitated by the Serbian courts in 2011 and on 6 October 2012 was reburied at the family crypt of Oplenac, near Topola in central Serbia, together with his wife Olga and son Nikola.

== Further research ==
Princess Elizabeth, his only daughter, obtained information from the British Special Operations Executive files in the Foreign Office in London and published them in Belgrade in the 1990 edition of the Serbian-language biography of her father. The original book, Paul of Yugoslavia: Britain's Maligned Friend, was co-written by Neil Balfour and Sally Mackay, being first published by Hamish Hamilton in London in 1980.

In 1967, the diaries of the Conservative MP Henry "Chips" Channon were published but were heavily censored, as homosexuality was still illegal in Britain, and many of the people named in the diaries were still alive, which exposed the publishers to the risk of libel suits. In February 2021, the first part of the uncensored version of Channon's diaries was published, which caused a stir as Channon wrote of having homosexual relations with numerous well-known men (among them the playwright Terence Rattigan), and it was strongly implied that Paul had been Channon's lover.

The Serbian historian Srdja Trifković wrote that Paul was a tragic figure: "Prince Pavle of Yugoslavia is a figure both unique and uniquely tragic in modern Serbian history. His was the story of a perennial outsider; a sophisticated art-lover thrust into the murky world of Balkan politics; an incorrigible Anglophile forced into unsavory deals with England's enemies; a gentleman in a world of perfidious rogues. Always at pains to square the demands of personal integrity with those of the 'art of the possible', he was ultimately unloved in Belgrade, mistrusted in Berlin and scorned in London."

== Art collections ==
Prince Paul, together with King Alexander I of Yugoslavia, collected, donated and dedicated a large number of art works to Serbia and the Serbian people, including foreign masterpieces. There are especially significant Italian, French and Dutch/Flemish pieces. Most of the works are in the National Museum of Serbia, including work by artists such as Rubens, Renoir, Monet, Titian, Van Gogh and Paul Gauguin.

== Honours ==
Serbian and Yugoslavian decorations
Order of the Karađorđe's Star, Knight Grand Cross
Order of the White Eagle, Knight Grand Cross
Order of the Yugoslav Crown, Knight Grand Cross
Order of St. Sava, Knight Grand Cross
Serbian Service Medals
Commemorative Medal of the Election of Peter I as King of Serbia
Commemorative Medal of the Albanian Campaign
Medal of the Serbian Red Cross
Foreign Honours
Order of Carol I, Grand Collar
Royal Victorian Order, Honorary Knight Grand Cross
Order of the Garter, Stranger Knight Companion
Sovereign Military Order of Malta, Associate Bailiff Grand Cross
Order of the Elephant, Knight
Legion of Honour, Knight Grand Cross
Order of the Redeemer, Knight Grand Cross
Order of Saints George and Constantine, Knight Grand Cross
Order of George I, Knight Grand Cross
Supreme Order of the Most Holy Annunciation, Knight Grand Cross
Order of Saints Maurice and Lazarus, Knight Grand Cross
Order of the White Lion, Collar
Order of the Crown of Italy, Knight Grand Cross
Order of the Golden Fleece, Knight
Order of Merit of the Kingdom of Hungary, Knight Grand Cross with Holy Crown and Collar
Order of St. Alexander, Knight Grand Cross in Diamonds

== Sources ==
- Balfour, Neil; Mackay, Sally (1980). Paul of Yugoslavia: Britain's Maligned Friend. London: Hamish Hamilton. ISBN 978-0-241-10392-0.
- Crampton, Richard (1997). Eastern Europe in the Twentieth Century-And After. London: Routledge.
- Hadzi-Jovancic, Perica (2020). The Third Reich and Yugoslavia An Economy of Fear, 1933–1941. London: Bloomsbury Publishing. ISBN 978-1-350-13806-3.
- Keegan, John (1989). The Second World War. New York: Viking.
- Trifković, Srdja (1997). "Prince Pavle Karadordević". In Peter Radan, Aleksandar Pavkovic (ed.). The Serbs and Their Leaders in the Twentieth Century. London: Routledge. pp. 158–202. ISBN 978-1-85521-891-8.
- Watt, Donald Cameron (1989). How War Came The Immediate Origins of the Second World War, 1938–39. London: Heinemannm.
- Weinberg, Gerhard (1970). The Foreign Policy of Hitler's Germany Diplomatic Revolution in Europe. Chicago: University of Chicago Press.
- Weinberg, Gerhard (1980). The Foreign Policy of Hitler's Germany Starting World War II. Chicago: University of Chicago Press.
- Weinberg, Gerhard (2005). A World At Arms A Global History of World War II. Cambridge: Cambridge University Press..

Prince Paul of Yugoslavia House of Karađorđević Born: 27 April 1893 Died: 14 September 1976
Political offices
Vacant Title last held by Alexander as Regent of Serbia	Regent of Yugoslavia; 9 October 1934 – 27 March 1941	Vacant Yugoslav coup d'état and declared Peter II of age
Military offices
Preceded by Position established	Deputy Commander in Chief of the Yugoslavian Armed Forces; 1934–1941	Succeeded by Petar Bojović
