= Supreme Order of the Most Holy Annunciation =

Catholic dynastic order of knighthood

Supreme Order of the Most Holy Annunciation Ordine Supremo della Santissima Annunziata
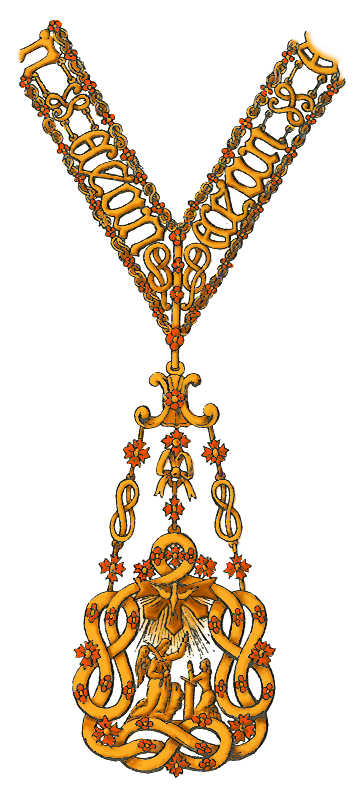
- The collar badge of the Order, which depicts Our Lady of the Annunciation, is worn on the feast day of the Most Holy Annunciation.

Awarded by The Duke of Savoy as Sovereign Head of the House of Savoy
- Type: Dynastic order of knighthood
- Established: c. 1362
- Royal house: House of Savoy
- Motto: FERT (Fortitudo Eius Rhodum Tulit; By his bravery he conquered Rhodes (Latin; disputed)
- Eligibility: Military and civilian
- Awarded for: Eminent service in high military positions; Distinguished civil service; Bringing distinction upon Italy; Rendering great service to the House of Savoy
- Status: Currently constituted
- Founder: Amadeus VI, Count of Savoy
- Sovereign: Prince Emanuele Filiberto
- Prince Emanuele Filiberto
- Grand Chancellor: Johannes Theo Niederhauser
- Grades: Knight

Precedence
- Next (higher): None (Highest)
- Next (lower): Royal Order of Saints Maurice and Lazarus
- Ribbon bar

The Supreme Order of the Most Holy Annunciation (Italian: Ordine Supremo della Santissima Annunziata) is a Catholic order of chivalry, originating in Savoy. It eventually was the pinnacle of the honours system in the Kingdom of Italy, which ceased to be a national order when the kingdom became a republic in 1946. Today, the order continues as a dynastic order under the jurisdiction of the Head of the House of Savoy.

== History and statutes ==
The Supreme Order of the Most Holy Annunciation originated in 1362, when Amadeus VI, Count of Savoy (1343–1383) instituted the order's earliest designation, under the title of Order of the Collar. The order was dedicated to the Blessed Virgin Mary, who is celebrated as "Our Lady of the Annunciation." The order is a dynastic religious (or Catholic) order of chivalry.

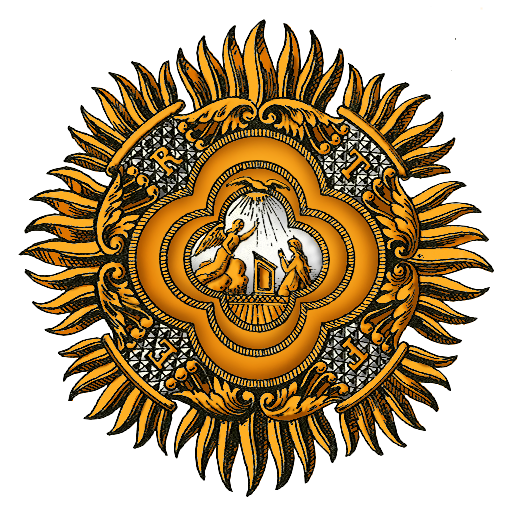
The Annunciation to the Virgin Mary is depicted on the plaque surrounded by the motto F.E.R.T., and is worn on the left breast of a knight of the Order

Under its first formulation, the order had fifteen knights. The number was symbolic of the number of daily masses celebrated with the order. In 1409, Amadeus VIII, Duke of Savoy, gave the order its first known statutes, and in 1434, he extended the order to five more knights.

Amadeus VIII's statutes were subsequently amended and reformed by Duke Carlo III in 1518, by Duke Emanuele Filiberto I in 1570, and thereafter by succeeding Sovereigns. The most recent took place on 11 June 1985 by Prince Vittorio Emanuele, Sovereign of the order. It was in 1518, that many of the present designations were instituted. Most importantly, the order's name was changed to its current name, The Most Holy Supreme Order of the Annunciation. The badge of the order was also changed, with the representation of the Blessed Virgin Mary being added.

The order, throughout its early history and following the reforms of Duke Carlo III, was awarded for supreme recognition of distinguished services. The order constituted a kind of religious and military fraternity between the Sovereign Head of the Order and his companions; it was reserved exclusively for distinguished men-at-arms who, apart from exemplary service, had to be of illustrious birth, particularly of catholic and noble birth.

Eventually, it was deemed appropriate to recognize those who had rendered distinguished service to the Kingdom of Italy (and the House of Savoy) in the exercise of high civil offices, not requiring, when such achievements could be demonstrated, nobility of birth as well.

The order holds the following other regulations:

- The number of knights of the Supreme Order of the Most Holy Annunciation shall be, as in the past, twenty.
- The right to appoint knights and officers of the Order appertains exclusively to the Sovereign Head. When there are vacancies, the Sovereign Head meets with the Chapter of Knights to hear their advice on the proposal of candidates whom he alone may select.
- The knights shall be chosen from distinguished individuals in recognition of their eminent services in high military positions, as well as from those who have distinguished themselves in senior positions in the civil service, and from those who, as private citizens have brought distinction upon Italy as exemplary benefactors of the Nation or of Mankind, or have rendered particularly noteworthy services to the Royal House of Savoy.
- Knights must have already been awarded the Order of Saints Maurice and Lazarus.
- Knights must be Catholic. On rare occasions, a non-Catholic may be awarded the order. However, they may only be honorary members of the order.

In 1925, a law was passed on the day before Christmas which made the Head of Government (who at the time was Benito Mussolini) the Secretary of the Order, and stipulated that he would preside over the Knights of the Order at public functions and ceremonies.

In October 2023, Princess Vittoria, Princess of Carignano was created the first female Knight of the Order since its inception, by her grandfather Prince Vittorio Emanuele, Prince of Naples, Sovereign of the Order. Upon her eventual ascension as the Head of the House of Savoy, The Princess of Carignano will also become the first female Sovereign of the Order.

== Classes and insignia ==
The order has one rank and grade, i.e. Knight. The full Italian title is Cavaliere dell'Ordine Supremo della Santissima Annunziata.

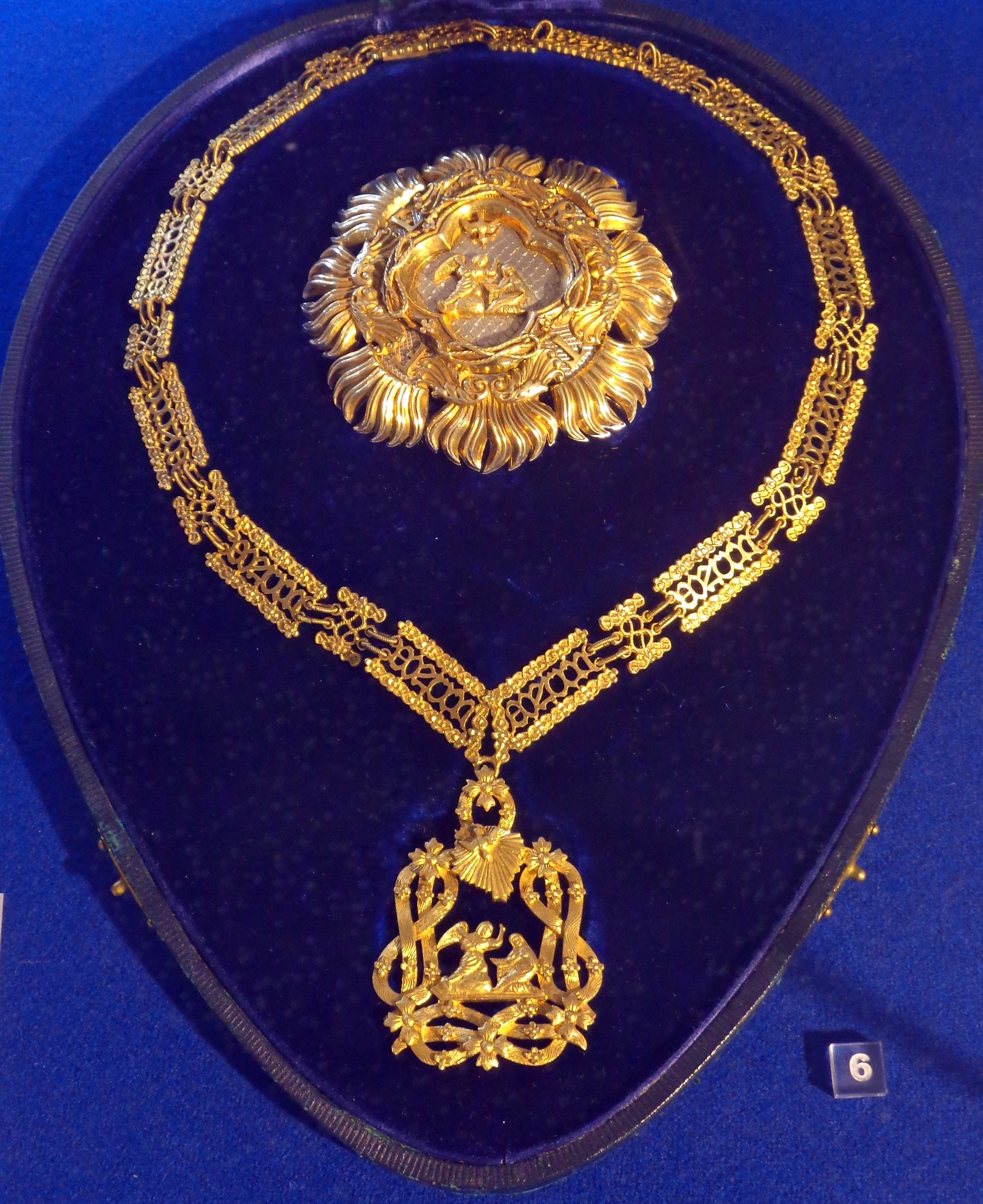
The Small Collar and the star badge of the Order

The order has two sets of insignia, the Small Collar (Piccola Collana) and the Grand Collar (Grande Collana). The two hold similar designs, though the Grande Collana has some different features than the Small Collar and is worn only on the most special of occasions.

The Grand Collar consists of fourteen ornate sections, each of which is made up of the letters FERT in gold, intertwined with a white and red enamelled Savoyan knot. The sections are interlinked with fourteen roses, alternately enamelled red and white. The roses represent the mysteries in the life of the Blessed Virgin Mary. The knots surrounding the medallion of the collar is enamelled white, red, and blue. Pending from one of the fourteen sections is the medallion, which portrays an enamelled depiction of the Annunciation of the Virgin Mary by the Archangel Gabriel. The medallion is surrounded by three intertwined Savoyan knots, decorated with small crosses fleury, and in the upper centre, between two of the Savoyan knots, a cluster of rays with a dove, representing the Holy Spirit, is depicted also in gold.

The Small Collar is similar to the Large Collar, although of reduced size and with additional differences. The collar is made up of fifteen, rather than fourteen sections, and they are not separated by enamelled rose. The whole collar and medallion are solid gold, rather than with colored enamel like the Large Collar. The medallion pends from the interactions of two of the fourteen sections, rather than pending from the middle of as in the Large Collar.

The star of the order, which was first used in 1680 by specifications of the Royal Lady Maria Giovana Battista, Duchess Regent of Savoy, is of gold and also has a representation of the Annunciation in a medallion in the centre which is set within a gold cross of four pommels. This is surrounded by a cluster of gold rays. Between the arms of the cross of four pommels are the letters F.E.R.T.

=== Regulations ===
The insignia of the order has the following regulations:

- The large collar (Grande Collana) is worn on the first day of the year, on the feast of the Most Holy Annunciation, and on all of the principal national holidays and at important royal functions.
- The small collar (Piccola Collana) is worn on every other occasion which necessitates the display of order insignia.
- Knights also wear, on the left breast, a star badge bearing the image of Holy Mary of the Annunciation.

On initiation of a new knight into the order, the small collar was worn by the initiate before the accolade by the Grand Master. After the accolade, the Grand Master would place the large collar over the shoulders of the new knight.

When the order is not worn, Knights may wear a gold miniature of the badge (medallion of the collar) of the order suspended from a red ribbon. They may also wear either a ribbon bar (upon a uniform) or a rosette (upon a suit), both of which are red and have a miniature cross of four pommels engraved with the Annunciation.

== Grand Magisterium ==
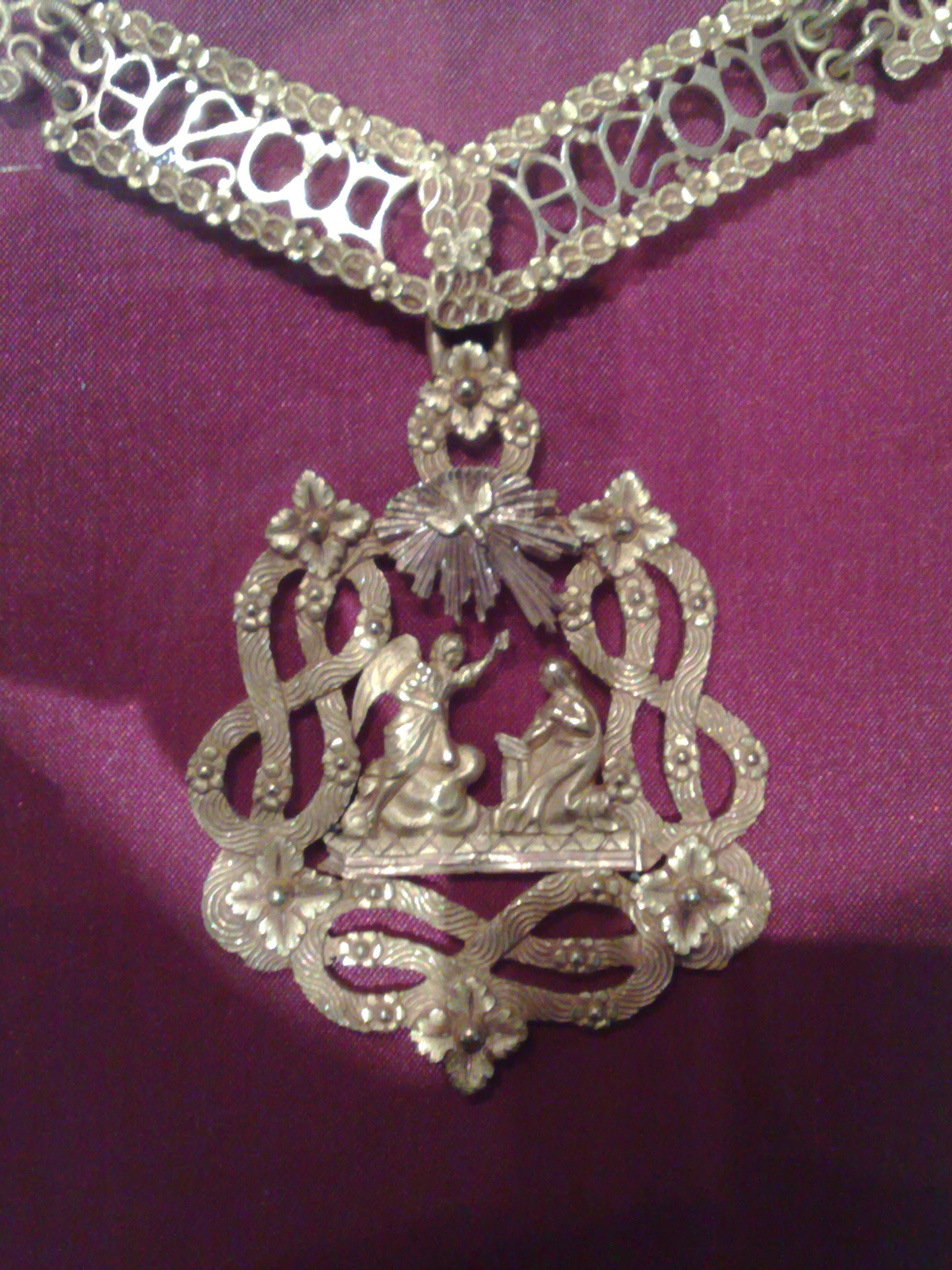
Modern small collar badge of the order

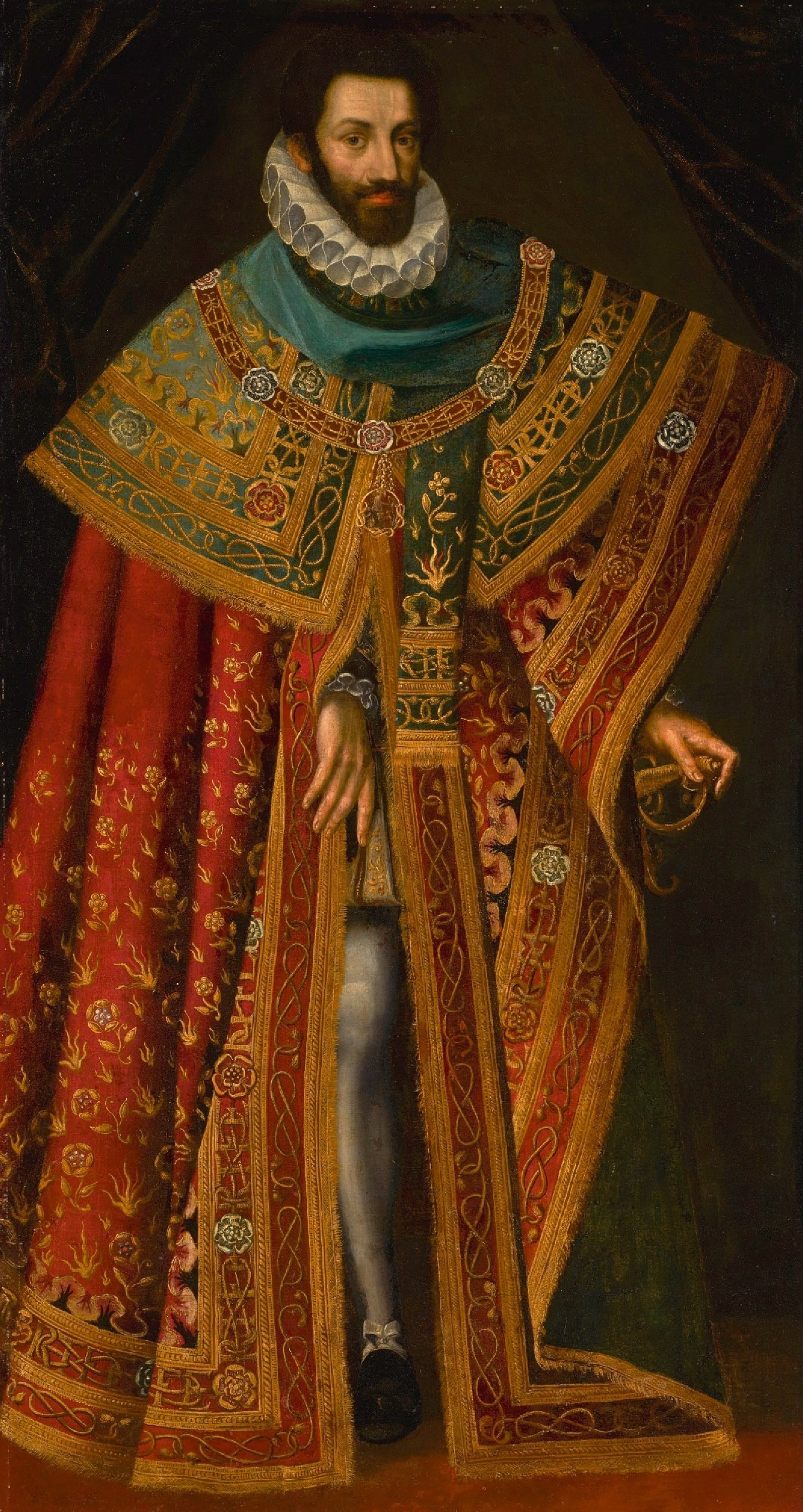
Emmanuel Philibert of Savoy in the robes of Order of the Most Holy Annunciation

While the Grand Magisterium of Prince Aimone of Savoy is limited to his claim, the Grand Magisterium of Emanuele Filiberto, Prince of Venice is currently in effect. The governing body of the dynastic orders of the Royal House of Savoy consists of the Sovereign and Grand Master of the Order, the Grand Chancellor of the Order, the Council of the Order, Members, and the Giunta of the Order. The following are some of those that make up the Grand Magisterium of the order.

- Grand Master: Emanuele Filiberto, Prince of Venice (Head of the Royal House of Savoy, disputed by Prince Aimone of Savoy)
- Chairman/President of the Council: Vacant, disputed by Prince Aimone of Savoy's son Prince Umberto)
- Cardinal protector: Giovanni Cardinal Cheli
- Grand Chancellor: Johannes Theo Niederhauser
- Grand Treasurer: Nicolas Gagnebin
- Grand Prior: Mgr. Paolo de Nicolò (titular Bishop of Mariana)
- Grand Master of Ceremonies: Alberto Bochicchio

== Notable Knights ==
- George V
- Philipp, Landgrave of Hesse
- Hermann Göring
- Simeon II of Bulgaria, last Monarch of Bulgaria and Prime Minister of Bulgari
- Felipe VI, current King of Spain
- Matthew Festing, former Grand Master of the Sovereign Military Order of Malta
- Benito Mussolini, Prime Minister of Italy and Duce of Fascism
- Vittorio Emanuele, Prince of Naples
- Princess Vittoria of Savoy - first female Knight in the history as of 2023.
- Prince Aimone, Duke of Aosta
- Emanuele Filiberto of Savoy, Prince of Venice
- Mariano Hugo, Prince of Windisch-Graetz
- Michael I of Romania
- Zog I, King of Albania
- Puyi, Emperor of China
- Mohammad Reza Pahlavi, Shah of Iran
- Reza Pahlavi, Crown Prince of Iran
- Among the notable recipients of the order of the Annunciation, Amanullah, King of Afghanistan (reigned 1919–1929) should probably be mentioned, especially since he was not a Christian. He received the honour during his State visit to Italy in 1928, when he authorized, for the first time, the opening of a Catholic church in Afghanistan (within the Italian Embassy) and the residence of a Catholic priest.

== See also ==
- Dynastic order
- List of Italian orders of knighthood
- Order of Merit of the Italian Republic
