= Tillay-le-Péneux =

- Commune
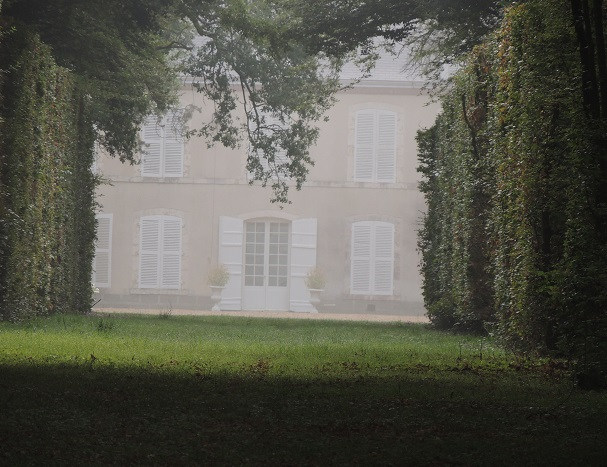
- The Villeprévost chateau in Tillay-le-Péneux
- Location of Tillay-le-Péneux
- Location within France Location within Centre-Val de Loire
- Coordinates: 48°09′39″N 1°46′32″E
- Country: France
- Region: Centre-Val de Loire
- Department: Eure-et-Loir
- Arrondissement: Châteaudun
- Canton: Les Villages Vovéens

Government
  - Mayor (2020–2026): Benoit Pommier
- Area^{1}: 22.19 km^{2} (8.57 sq mi)
- Elevation: 128 m (420 ft)
- Highest elevation: 141 m (463 ft)
- Lowest elevation: 118 m (387 ft)
- Population (2023): 316
  - Density: 14.2/km^{2} (36.9/sq mi)
- Time zone: UTC+01:00 (CET)
  - Summer (DST): UTC+02:00 (CEST)
- INSEE/Postal code: 28390 /28140
- ^{1} French Land Register data, which excludes lakes, ponds, glaciers > 1 km^{2} (0.386 sq mi or 247 acres) and river estuaries.

Tillay-le-Péneux (French pronunciation: [tijɛ lə penø]) is a commune in the Eure-et-Loir department in the centre of France.

== Population ==
Historical population
Year	Pop.	±% p.a.
1968	447	—
1975	314	−4.92%
1982	241	−3.71%
1990	220	−1.13%
1999	293	+3.24%
2007	349	+2.21%
2012	337	−0.70%
2017	324	−0.78%
2023	316	−0.42%
Source: INSEE

== See also ==
- Communes of the Eure-et-Loir department
