= Civil Order of Savoy =

Military order

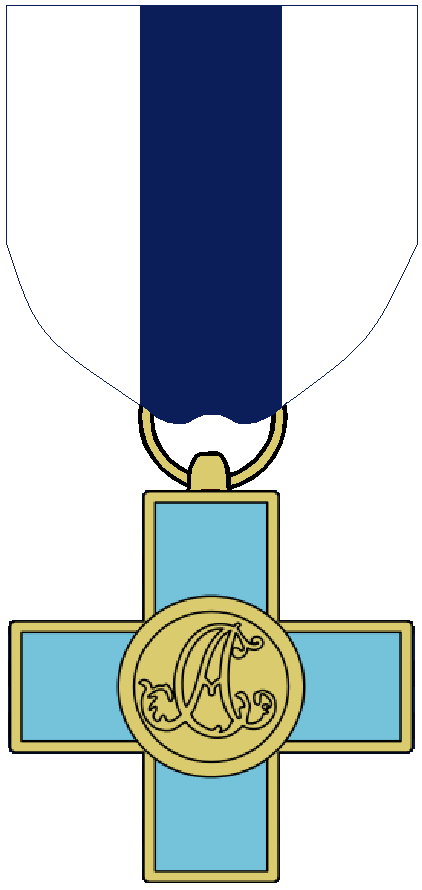

Awarded by the Kingdom of Sardinia
- Established: 1831
- Status: Defunct

Precedence
- Next (higher): Military Order of Savoy
- Next (lower): Order of the Crown of Italy
- Ribbon bar

The Civil Order of Savoy was founded as an order of knighthood in 1831 by the King of Sardinia, Charles Albert, Duke of Savoy. It is now replaced by the Order of Merit of Savoy. The intention was to reward those virtues not belonging to the existing Military Order of Savoy, founded by Vittorio Emanuele I in 1815. The order has one degree, that of Knight (Cavalieri dell'Ordine civile di Savoia), and is limited to 70 members. Admission is in the personal gift of the head of the House of Savoy.

The insignia bears the inscription Al Merito Civile—1831; the letters C.A. on the reverse substituted for V.E. after the death of Charles Albert in 1849.

The civil order was continued on the unification of Italy in 1861, but has been suppressed by law since the foundation of the Republic in 1946. Umberto II did not abdicate his position as fons honorum however, and the now dynastic order remains under the Grand Mastership of the head of the former Royal house. While the continued use of those decorations awarded prior to 1951 is permitted in Italy, they no longer confer any right of precedence in official ceremonies.

== Recipients ==
- Prince Aimone, Duke of Aosta
- Luigi Calori
- Prince Vittorio Emanuele, Count of Turin

== Order of Merit of Savoy ==
Order of Merit of Savoy
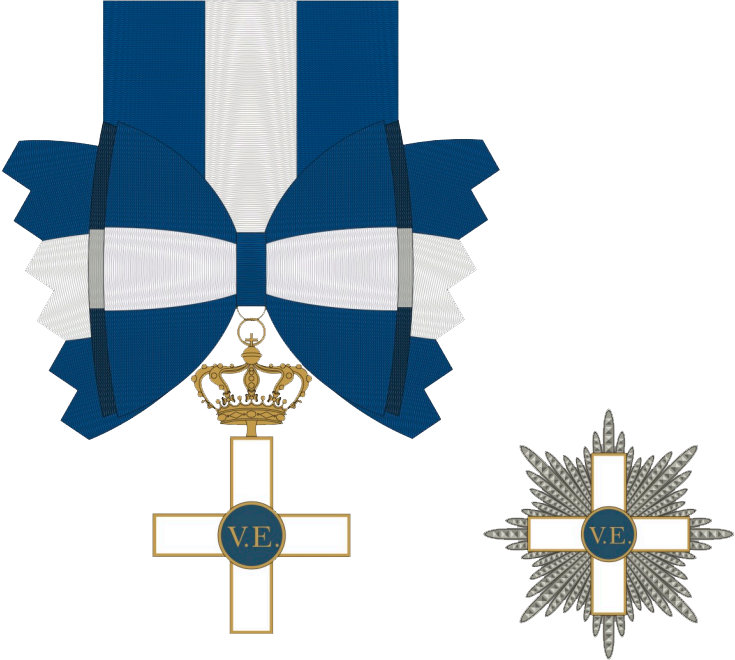
- Grand Cross insignia

Awarded by The Duke of Savoy as Sovereign Head of the House of Savoy
- Type: Dynastic order
- Established: 23 January 1988
- Country: Italy
- Royal house: House of Savoy
- Motto: F.E.R.T. (Fortitudo Eius Rhodum Tulit; By his bravery he conquered Rhodes)
- Status: Active
- Founder: Vittorio Emanuele, Prince of Naples
- Sovereign: Emanuele Filiberto, Prince of Venice
- Classes: Knight Grand Cross Dame Grand Cross Grand Officer Commander Dame Commander Officer Knight Dame

Precedence
- Next (higher): Order of Saints Maurice and Lazarus
- Next (lower): Order of the Crown of Italy
- Equivalent: Civil Order of Savoy
- Ribbon bar

The Order of Merit of Savoy (OMS) is a dynastic order of knighthood that is awarded by the head of the Royal House of Savoy. Following the demise of the last reigning monarch (Umberto II of Italy) in 1983, the Order of the Crown of Italy was replaced in 1988 by the Order of Merit of Savoy that was instituted by his heir (Vittorio Emanuele, Prince of Naples), who was the head of the House of Savoy at that time. While the Ordine al merito di Savoia has never been a national order, it is subsidiary to the Civil Order of Savoy, which was the Order of Merit. It has around 2000 members and, as with the Order of the Crown of Italy previously, it is entrusted to the Chancellor of the Order of Saints Maurice and Lazarus.

== Civil Order of Savoy ==
The Civil Order of Savoy was founded as an order of knighthood in 1831 by the King of Sardinia, Charles Albert, Duke of Savoy. The intention was to reward those virtues not belonging to the existing Military Order of Savoy, founded by Vittorio Emanuele I in 1815. The order has one degree, that of Knight (Cavalieri dell'Ordine civile di Savoia), and is limited to 70 members. Admission is in the personal gift of the head of the House of Savoy

== The Order of the Crown of Italy ==
(Italian: Ordine della Corona d'Italia) was founded as a national order in 1868 by King Vittorio Emanuele II, to commemorate the unification of Italy in 1861. It was awarded in five degrees for civilian and military merit.Compared with the older Order of Saints Maurice and Lazarus (1572), the Order of the Crown of Italy was awarded more liberally and could be conferred on non-Catholics as well; eventually, it became a requirement for a person to have already received the Order of the Crown of Italy in at least the same degree before receiving the Order of Saints Maurice and Lazarus.The order has been suppressed by law since the foundation of the Republic in 1946. However, Umberto II did not abdicate his position as fons honorumand it remained under his Grand Mastership as a dynastic order. While the continued use of those decorations conferred prior to 1951 is permitted in Italy, the crowns on the ribbons issued before 1946 must be substituted for as many five pointed stars on military uniforms.

== Ranks and grades ==
The Order of Merit of Savoy is divided like Order of Saints Maurice and Lazarus into the following ranks:

- Knights of Grand Cross, no more than one hundred (100);

- Dames of Grand Cross, no more than one hundred (100);

- Grand Officers, no more than one hundred and fifty (150);

- Commanders, who may be no more than three hundred (300);

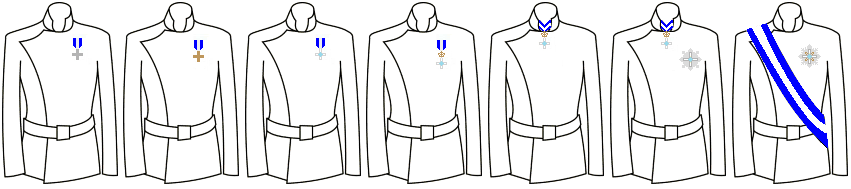
Medals and decorations from Silver Cross award (left) to Knights of Grand Cross (right)- Dames not included

- Dames Commander, no more than three hundred (300);

- Knight Officers, of an unspecified number;

- Knights, an unspecified number;

- Dames, an unspecified number.

=== Non-order merit awards ===
- Gold cross - Silver cross

== Dress and Robes ==
The Order decoration is a white-enamelled, full gold cross, loaded by a blue-enamelled, white shield, with the letters "V.E." on one side and this inscription on the other: "To the Merit of Savoy 1988". The blue silk ribbon with a great white pole, a turquoise cloth mantle, adjusted at the ruff by four cords with white and blue silk tassels and with the cross of the Order embroidered on the left side, in various sizes depending on rank.

== Grand Masters of the order ==
1. Vittorio Emanuele, Prince of Naples, Duke of Savoy (1988–2024)
2. Emanuele Filiberto, Prince of Venice, Duke of Savoy (2024–Present)

== The council ==
The council is responsible for running the order, the order focuses mainly on charitable acts.

- Chairman: Vacant
- Vice Chairman: Antonio d'Amelio
- Grand Chancellor: Theo Niederhauser
- Grand Treasurer: Nicolas Gagnebin
- Grand Prior: Monsignor Paolo de Nicolò
- Grand Master of Ceremonies: Prof. Alberto Bochicchio
- HSH Mariano Hugo, Prince of Windisch-Graetz
- HSH Don Alessandro Jacopo Boncompagni Ludovisi Altemps
- Don Giancarlo Melzi d'Eril dei Duchi di Lodi
- Don Carlo Buffa dei Conti di Perrero – Honorary Member

== The Junta ==
The Junta is responsible for voting in new Knight or Dame to the dynastic order on behalf of the grand master, Emanuele Filiberto, Prince of Venice. There are always five members of the Junta to ensure that there is never an equal count in votes for and against a new possible new Knight or Dame.

- HSH Don Alessandro Jacopo Boncompagni Ludovisi Altemps – President
- Don Paolo Thaon di Revel Vandini – Secretary
- Don Enrico Sanjust dei Baroni di Teulada
- Gualtiero Ventura
- Federico Pizzi

== Additional information ==
According to International Commission for Orders of Chivalry the Order of Merit is also known as the Merit of Savoy

Under their section: chivalric institutions founded by the head of a formerly reigning dynasty, the Order has been defined as the following since their 2016 register:

ITALY

House of Savoy (Catholic)

Merit of Savoy

Founded: Crown Prince Vittorio Emanuele of Savoy, Prince of Piedmont and Prince of Naples 23 January 1988.

Ribbon: Blue with a broad white centre stripe.

Grand Master: Crown Prince Vittorio Emanuele of Savoy, Prince of Piedmont and Prince of Naples (Vittorio Emanuele IV, Titular King of Italy) (b. 1937).

== Recipients (amongst others) ==
As of the year 2000 there are/were 1453 recipients of the Order of Merit.

- Emanuele Filiberto of Savoy, Prince of Venice, Knight Grand Cross
- Clotilde Courau, Princess of Venice
- Princess Vittoria of Savoy, Princess of Carignano Marchioness of Ivrea
- Princess Luisa of Savoy
- Marina Doria, Princess of Naples and Duchess of Savoy
- Princess Maria Pia of Bourbon-Parma
- Princess Maria Gabriella of Savoy
- Princess Maria Beatrice of Savoy
- Prince Dimitri of Yugoslavia
- Prince Michael of Yugoslavia
- Prince Sergius of Yugoslavia
- Marquise Mirko Cuneo
- Princess Helen of Yugoslavia
- Nicholas, Crown Prince of Montenegro
- Prince Carlo, Duke of Castro
- Mariano Hugo, Prince of Windisch-Graetz Knight Grand Cross
- Prince Don Alessandro Jacopo Boncompagni Ludovisi Altemps Knight Grand Cross
- Marquess Paolo Thaon di Revel Vandini Knight Grand Cross
- Baron Enrico Sanjust dei Baroni di Teulada Knight Grand Cross
- Prof. Alberto Bochicchio Knight Grand Cross
- Count Carlo Buffa dei Conti di Perrero Knight Grand Cross
- Count Giuseppe Rizzani Knight Grand Cross
- Rudy Giuliani Knight Grand Cross
- Giovanni Cheli Knight Grand Cross
- Duke Giancarlo Melzi d'Eril Knight Grand Cross
- Count Andrea Boezio Bertinotti Alliata
- Andrea Rivoira Knight Grand Cross
- Antonio d'Amelio Knight Grand Cross
- Franca Sciaraffia Dame Grand Cross
- Nicolas Gagnebin Knight Grand Cross
- Theo Niederhauser Knight Grand Cross
- Monsignor Paolo de Nicolò Knight Grand Cross
- Alberto Di Maria Knight Grand Officer
- Dame Zina Losapio
- Alessandro Santini
- Gino Lupini
- Marco Bocchio
- Massimiliano Fissore Ph.D.
- Alberico Guerzoni
- Alberto Coluccia
- Simone Balestrini
- Giovanni Cheli
- Rudy Giuliani

== See also ==
- List of Italian orders of knighthood
- Order of the Crown of Italy
