= Order of the Crown of Italy =

Italian order

Order of the Crown of Italy Ordine della Corona d'Italia
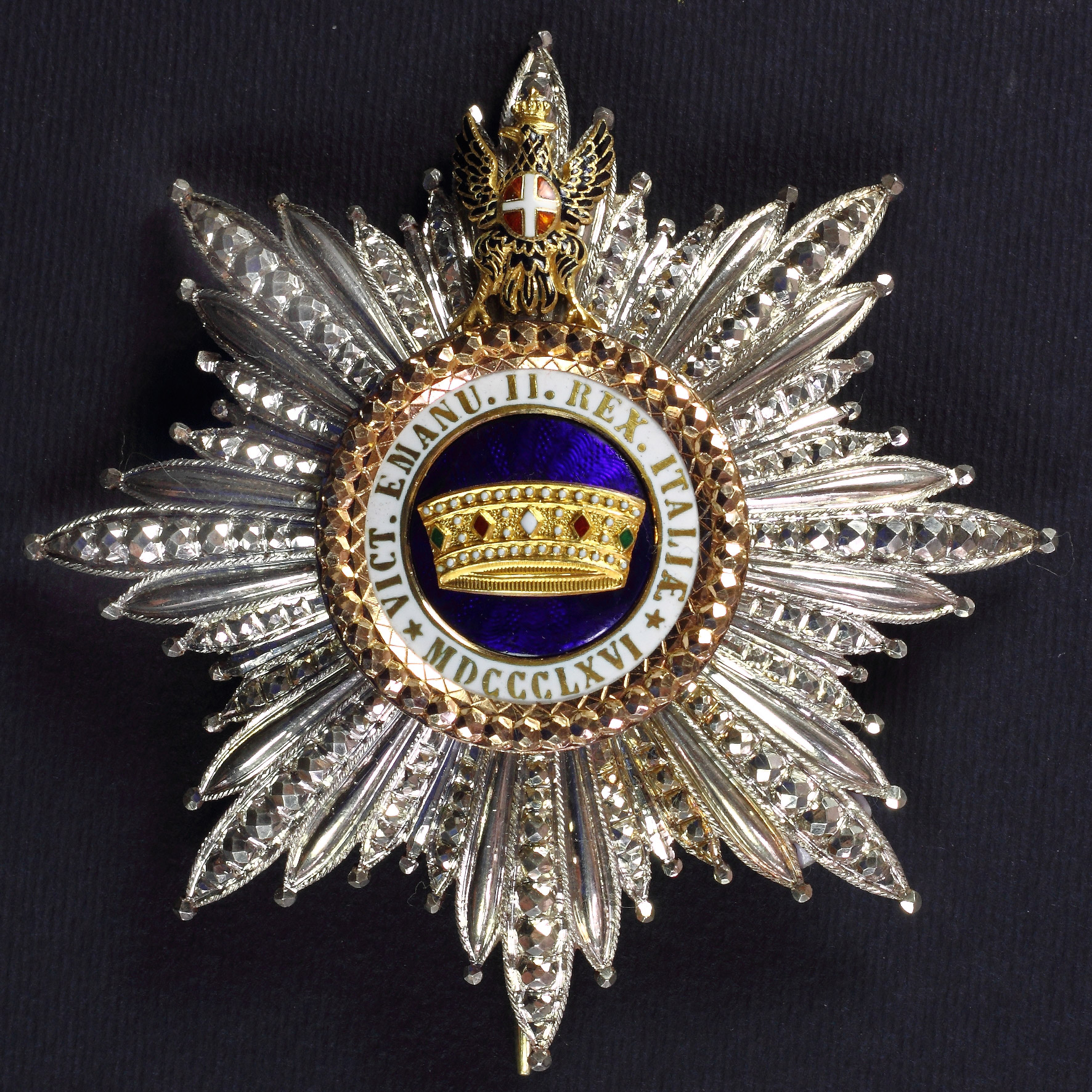
- Star of the Grand Cordon set of the Order

Awarded by The Head of the Italian Royal Family
- Type: Dynastic Order of Knighthood
- Established: 20 February 1868
- Royal house: House of Savoy
- Eligibility: Military, civilian
- Awarded for: Meritorious Service or Achievement
- Status: Rarely constituted
- Founder: King Victor Emmanuel II
- Grand Master: Prince Emanuele Filiberto, Prince of Venice (disputed) Prince Aimone, Duke of Aosta (disputed)
- Chairman of the Council: Vacant
- Grades: Knight Grand Cross; Grand Officer; Commander; Officer; Knight

Precedence
- Next (higher): Royal Order of Saints Maurice and Lazarus
- Next (lower): Royal Civil Order of Savoy; Royal Military Order of Savoy
- Ribbon bar

The Order of the Crown of Italy (Italian: Ordine della Corona d'Italia or OCI) was founded as a national order in 1868 by King Vittorio Emanuele II, to commemorate the unification of Italy in 1861. It was awarded in five degrees for civilian and military merit. Today the Order of the Crown has been replaced by the Order of Merit of Savoy and is still conferred on new knights by the current disputed head of the house, Emanuele Filiberto, Prince of Venice.

The order has been suppressed by law since the foundation of the Republic in 1946. However, Umberto II did not abdicate his position as fons honorum and it remained under his Grand Mastership as a dynastic order. While the continued use of those decorations conferred prior to 1951 is permitted in Italy, the crowns on the ribbons issued before 1946 must be substituted for as many five pointed stars on military uniforms.

== Grades ==
The various degrees of the order, with corresponding ribbons, were as follows:

Ribbon	Class (English)	Class (Italian)	Manner of wear
	Knight Grand Cross	Cavaliere di Gran Croce decorati del Grande Cordone	Badge on sash on right shoulder, plus star on left chest
	Grand Officer	Grande Ufficiale dell'Ordine della Corona d'Italia	Star on left chest
	Commander	Commendatore dell'Ordine della Corona d'Italia	Badge on necklet
	Officer	Ufficiale dell'Ordine della Corona d'Italia	Badge on ribbon with rosette on left chest
	Knight	Cavaliere dell'Ordine della Corona d'Italia	Badge on ribbon on left chest

== Insignia ==
Medals
Kingdom of Italy
Knight	Officer	Commander	Grand Officer	Knight Grand Cross
Italian Republic and Savoy House
Knight	Officer	Commander	Grand Officer	Knight Grand Cross

== Members ==
Members of the order have included:

- Gregor Carl Georg Aminoff (1872-1934), Swedish chamberlain
- Isaac Artom (1829–1900), Italian writer diplomat, and politician
- Harry Woodburn Blaylock (1878–1928), Canadian lawyer and businessman
- Aaron Bradshaw Jr. (1894–1976), United States Army; World War II, commanded anti-aircraft forces of U.S. Fifth Army
- John Buchan (1875–1940), Scottish novelist and diplomat
- Esteban Campodónico (1866-1938), Italian-Peruvian medical doctor, university professor, and philanthropist
- Vice Admiral Felice Napoleone Canevaro (1838–1926), Italian admiral and diplomat
- Sydney Wentworth Carroll (1877-1958), theatrical producer, after production of Napoleon: The Hundred Days, written by Benito Mussolini
- Major-General Walter Clutterbuck (1894–1987), British Army, World War II
- Admiral Angelo Ugo Conz (1871-1948), Italian Navy, World War I, Italian admiral and senator
- Adolf von Deines (1845–1911), Prussian diplomat and General of the Cavalry
- Arthur Conan Doyle (1859–1930), Scottish statesman and Sherlock Holmes author
- Commander Sir Thomas Fisher, RN, British naval officer, managing director of the Canadian Pacific Steamship Company
- Contralmirante (Counter Admiral) Mateo García de los Reyes (1872–1936), Spanish Navy officer and minister of the navy, organizer and first chief of the Spanish submarine force
- James Whitelaw Hamilton (1860–1932), Scottish artist, member of the Royal Scottish Academy
- William Ernest Powell Giles (1835–1897), Australian explorer and gambler
- Thomas Hanbury (1832–1907), English philanthropist and creator of the Giardini Botanici Hanbury
- Major General James Murray Robert Harrison DSO, CB (1880–1957), Royal Artillery, British Army, in recognition of services on the Italian front during World War I
- Inoue Kaoru (1836–1915), Japanese politician and a member of the Genrō
- Vice Admiral Jules James (1885–1957) Commander, U.S. Naval Forces, Mediterranean at the close of World War II, decorated by the last King of Italy, Umberto II during his 34-day reign in 1946
- Rear Admiral Katō Hiroharu (1870–1939), Imperial Japanese Navy; Grand Officer in 1920
- Major General Clayton P. Kerr (1900–1977), United States Army general, World War II member of the Allied mission to the Italian Royal Army
- Edward King, Viscount Kingsborough, in recognition of his work in researching and compiling his 'Antiquities of Mexico'
- Valerico Laccetti (1836–1909), Italian painter; knight, later commander
- Giovanni Marinelli (1879–1944), Italian Fascist politician
- Eugen Joseph Ferdinand von Malaisé (1835-1915) Major-General, Royal Bavarian Artillery.
- Mati Logoreci (1867–1941), Albanian educator, linguist, and publisher; Knight in 1929.
- Major General Robert A. McClure (1897–1957), father of U.S. Army Special Operations, Director of Information and Media Control at Supreme Headquarters Allied Expeditionary Force (SHAEF) during World War II
- Brigadier General Billy Mitchell (1879–1936), United States Army air power advocate
- Cesare Nava (1861–1933), Italian politician
- Ōkuma Shigenobu (1838–1922), Japanese politician
- Edwin B. Parker (1868–1929), American lawyer and politician, member of the War Industries Board and arbiter with Germany, Austria, and Hungary following World War I
- Charles Poletti (1903–2002), American lawyer and politician, Governor of New York, and colonel in the United States Army; served in Italy during World War II
- John Rylands (1801–1888), English entrepreneur and philanthropist
- Most Reverend Pietro Sfair (1888-1974), Titular Archbishop of Nisibis dei Maroniti and Council Father at the Second Vatican Council
- Alfred T. Smith (1874–1939), U.S. Army brigadier general
- Alexander William Stewart (1868–1933), Scottish naval architect, engineer, and inventor
- Rear Admiral Yates Stirling Jr. (1872–1948), United States Navy sea power advocate
- General Sebastiano Visconti Prasca (1883–1961), Italian Royal Army
- William Verbeck
- Giacomo Vuxani (1886–1964), Italian politician and patriot
- Wakatsuki Reijirō (1866–1949), Japanese politician
- Brigadier General George H. Weems, United States Army, World War II
- Major General Arthur R. Wilson (1894–1956), United States Army, World War II, commanded Coastal Base Section in Naples
- Russell Wilson (1876–1946), four-term mayor of Cincinnati, Ohio
- Yoshida Shigeru (1878–1967), Japanese diplomat, and politician
- Horatio Herbert Kitchener (1850-1916), Field Marshal in the British Army
- Maharaja Hari Singh (1895-1961) Princely State J&K
- Salvatore Salvatore, Italian politician from Roio del Sangro, Abruzzo; awarded by King Victor Emmanuel III

== Order of Merit of Savoy ==
The Order of Merit of Savoy was founded by Vittorio Emanuele, Prince of Naples, on 23 January 1988, within the framework of the Civil Order of Savoy“. Current Grand Master is Emanuele Filiberto, Prince of Venice.

The insignia are the same as those of the Civil Order, but with the white vitreous enamel of the Order of the Crown. The ribbon is blue with a broad white centre stripe.

The order has the same classes as the Order of the Crown, additionally a Gold Cross of Merit and a Silver Cross of Merit is awarded below the Knight's cross.

=== Recipients (amongst others) ===
As of the year 2000 there are/were 1453 recipients of the Order of Merit.

- Emanuele Filiberto of Savoy, Prince of Venice, Knight Grand Cross
- Clotilde Courau, Princess of Venice
- Princess Vittoria of Savoy, Princess of Carignano Marchioness of Ivrea
- Princess Luisa of Savoy
- Marina Doria, Princess of Naples and Duchess of Savoy
- Princess Maria Pia of Bourbon-Parma
- Princess Maria Gabriella of Savoy
- Princess Maria Beatrice of Savoy
- Prince Dimitri of Yugoslavia
- Prince Michael of Yugoslavia
- Prince Sergius of Yugoslavia
- Princess Helen of Yugoslavia
- Nicholas, Crown Prince of Montenegro
- Prince Carlo, Duke of Castro
- Mariano Hugo, Prince of Windisch-Graetz Knight Grand Cross
- Prince Don Alessandro Jacopo Boncompagni Ludovisi Altemps Knight Grand Cross
- Marquess Paolo Thaon di Revel Vandini Knight Grand Cross
- Baron Enrico Sanjust dei Baroni di Teulada Knight Grand Cross
- Prof. Alberto Bochicchio Knight Grand Cross
- Count Carlo Buffa dei Conti di Perrero Knight Grand Cross
- Count Giuseppe Rizzani Knight Grand Cross
- Rudy Giuliani Knight Grand Cross
- Giovanni Cheli Knight Grand Cross
- Duke Giancarlo Melzi d'Eril Knight Grand Cross
- Count Andrea Boezio Bertinotti Alliata
- Andrea Rivoira Knight Grand Cross
- Antonio d’Amelio Knight Grand Cross
- Franca Sciaraffia Dame Grand Cross
- Nicolas Gagnebin Knight Grand Cross
- Theo Niederhauser Knight Grand Cross
- Monsignor Paolo de Nicolò Knight Grand Cross
- Alberto Di Maria
- Dame Zina Losapio
- Alessandro Santini
- Gino Lupini
- Marco Bocchio
- Alberico Guerzoni
- Alberto Coluccia
- Simone Balestrini
- Giovanni Cheli
- Francesco Ruffini

== See also ==
- List of Italian orders of knighthood
- Dynastic Orders of Knighthood
