= Luigi Calori =

Italian physician

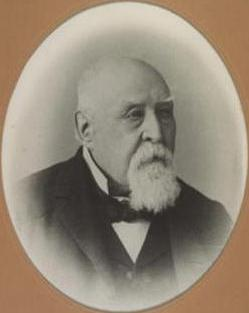
- Born: 8 February 1807; San Pietro in Casale
- Died: 19 December 1896 (aged 89)
- Occupation: Physician
- Known for: Anatomy

Luigi Calori (8 February 1807 – 19 December 1896) was an Italian physician who was Professor of Human Anatomy at the University of Bologna for over 50 years.

== Life ==
Luigi Calori was born in San Pietro in Casale in 1807, son of Teresa Gibelli and Francesco Calori. His father was a country doctor. He first studied at the Jesuit college in Ferrara before going on the University of Bologna. He graduated on 7 July 1829 with a medical degree. During his years of study he met several exponents of Italian culture including Gioachino Rossini. He was appointed anatomical prosector at the university on 4 November 1830. He obtained a degree in Surgery on 4 April 1833. In 1835 he was appointed Professor of Pictorial Anatomy at the Academy of Fine Arts, Bologna, holding this position until 1845.

On 19 October 1844 he was appointed Professor of Anatomy at the University of Bologna in succession to Professor Mondini. He held this position for 52 years until the day of his death in 1896. He was also Director of the anatomical museum of Bologna from 1850 to 1896, Dean of the Medical Faculty of Bologna in the years 1869–72 and 1882–85, Great Rector of the University of Bologna in 1876–77, honorary member and then several times President (1863–71, 1880–81, 1884–88) of the Academy of Sciences of Bologna Institute, and president of the Medical Surgery Society of Bologna in 1856 and 1888.

== Work ==
Calori produced a great volume of scientific work. He was interested in many areas of anatomy including normal anatomy, pathological anatomy, teratology and comparative anatomy. He was assisted by Caesar Bettini. He was interested in anthropology, and wrote on differences in anatomy between natives of different parts of the world. He concluded from his examinations of the brains of Negroes that, although they were generally similar to those of Europeans, there was evidence that they were closer to the ape. In 1873 Bologna published at the city's expense his book Of the Races which have stocked the ancient Necropolis at the Certosa of Bologna, with 17 plates, in a limited edition of 62 copies to be distributed among the learned men of Europe.

Calori left many valuable preserved specimens and models that fill the university's museums of normal anatomy, pathology and comparative anatomy. His collection of over two thousand skulls, dating from the Middle Ages to the contemporary era, is preserved in glass cases in the entrance corridor of the Institutes of Anatomy, in Via Irnerio 48.

== Honors and recognition ==
Umberto I of Italy appointed Calori Commander of the Order of Saints Maurice and Lazarus at the ceremony sponsored by the Academy of Sciences to honor its fifty years of teaching. He was also awarded the honors of Knight and Commander of the Order of the Crown of Italy, Knight of the Order of Guadalupe in the Second Mexican Empire and Knight of the Civil Order of Savoy. In 1885, when the anatomist was still alive, the Piazza Maggiore in his home town was dedicated to him and is now called Piazza Calori.

== Bibliography ==
Selected writings:

- Calori, Luigi (1854). Sulla struttura dell' Helamys cafter F. Cuvier. Tipi a S. Tommaso d'Aquino.
- Calori, Luigi (1873). Of the Races which have stocked the ancient Necropolis at the Certosa of Bologna, and of the Nations allied to them. A Historico-anthropoligical Discourse. Bologna. p. 169.
- Calori, Luigi (1877). Sur la Génération vivipare du Cloë diptera ("Ephemera diptera" Linn.), observations du professeur Luigi Calori. Traduit de l'italien et annoté par le Dr Émile Joly,... impr. de Clavel-Ballivet.

== Notes and references ==
Citations

Sources'

- Davis, J.Barnard (1872). "Notice of some recent anatomical writings bearing upon anthropology, by Prof. Luigi Calori, of Bologna". The Journal of the Anthropological Institute of Great Britain and Ireland. Anthropological Institute of Great Britain and Ireland.
- Haller, John S. (1971). Outcasts from Evolution: Scientific Attitudes of Racial Inferiority, 1859-1900. SIU Press. ISBN 978-0-8093-1982-4.
- Ljunggren, Bengt; Bruyn, G. W. (2002). The Nobel Prize in Medicine and the Karolinska Institute: The Story of Axel Key and Alfred Nobel. Karger Publishers. ISBN 978-3-8055-7297-2.
- London Anthropological Society (1875). "Of the Races which have stocked the ancient Necropolis at the Certosa of Bologna". Anthropologia. Baillière, Tindale, & Cox.
- Ruggeri, Alessandro (2007). Luigi Calori: una vita dedicata alla scienza. Medimond. ISBN 9788875873936. Published on the occasion of the bicentenary of his birth
