= Adelaide of Savoy =

Adelaide of Savoy may refer to:

- Adila, often called Adelaide, wife of Amadeus I, Count of Savoy
- Adelaide of Susa (c. 1014/20–1091), daughter of Ulric Manfred II of Turin, wife of Otto I, Count of Savoy
- Adelaide of Savoy (died 1079), daughter of Otto I, Count of Savoy and Adelaide of Susa, wife of Rudolf of Rheinfelden
- Adelaide (d. aft. 1134), daughter of Amadeus II, Count of Savoy, wife of Manasses, sire de Coligny
- Adelaide of Maurienne (1092–1154), daughter of Umberto II, Count of Savoy, married first Louis VI of France and then Matthieu I of Montmorency
- Princess Henriette Adelaide of Savoy (1636–1676), daughter of Victor Amadeus I, Duke of Savoy, married Ferdinand Maria, Elector of Bavaria
- Princess Marie Adélaïde of Savoy (1685–1712), daughter of Victor Amadeus II, Duke of Savoy, married Louis, Dauphin of France, Duke of Burgundy
- Maria Carolina Antonietta Adelaide, better known as Princess Maria Carolina of Savoy (1764–1782), daughter of Victor Amadeus III of Sardinia, married Anthony of Saxony
- Maria Adelaide Clothilde Xaveria Borbonia of Savoy (1794–1802), daughter of Victor Emmanuel I of Sardinia
- Adelaide of Austria (1822–1855), daughter of Archduke Rainer Joseph of Austria, married Victor Emmanuel II of Sardinia; was Duchess of Savoy prior to husband's accession
- Princess Adelaide of Savoy-Genoa, (1904–1979), daughter of Prince Thomas, Duke of Genoa, married Leone Massimo, Prince of Arsoli
- Maria Gabriella Giuseppa Aldegonda Adelaide Ludovica Felicita Gennara, better known as Princess Maria Gabriella of Savoy (b. 1940), daughter of Umberto II of Italy, married Robert Zellinger de Balkany
- Vittoria Cristina Adelaide Chiara Maria, better known as Princess Vittoria of Savoy (born 2003), daughter of Emanuele Filiberto, Prince of Venice and Piedmont
