= General audience =

General audience may refer to:

- The public
- Audience measurement
- Audience (meeting)
- General Audience or General Audiences, used in the motion picture content rating systems of various countries
