= Order of Saints Maurice and Lazarus =

Roman Catholic dynastic order of knighthood

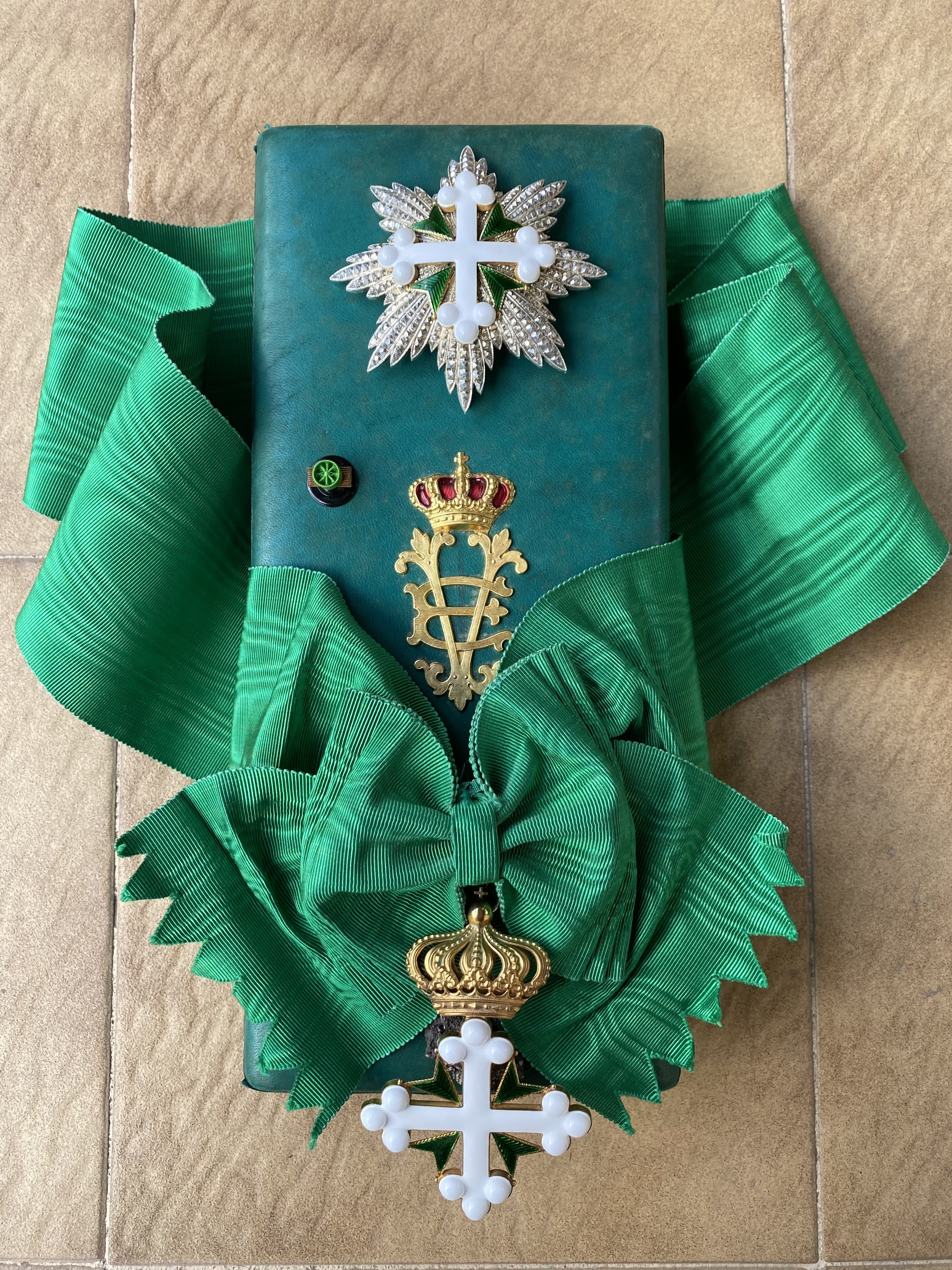
- Grand Cross insignia of the Order

Awarded by (Italy) House of Savoy
- Established: 16 September 1572 (Order of Saint Maurice: 1434) (Order of Saint Lazarus: 1119)
- Religious affiliation: Catholic
- Seat: Savoy-Carignano: Geneva, Switzerland; Savoy-Aosta: Turin, Italy
- Motto: Savoye, bonnes nouvelles
- Eligibility: Military, civilian
- Awarded for: Distinguished merits
- Status: De facto abolished state order of merit; Awarded privately as a dynastic order
- Grand Master: (Disputed): Savoy-Carignano: Emanuele Filiberto, Prince of Venice; Savoy-Aosta: Prince Aimone, Duke of Aosta
- Grades: Grand Cordon, Special Class; Grand Cordon; Grand Officer; Commander; Officer; Knight/Dame
- Post-nominals: OSML
- Website: Savoy-Carignano: ordinidinasticicasasavoia.it; Savoy-Aosta: https://casarealedisavoia.it/

Statistics
- Total inductees: 4,000-5,000

Precedence
- Next (higher): Royal Supreme Order of the Most Holy Annunciation
- Next (lower): Royal Order of the Crown
- Ribbon bar

The Order of Saints Maurice and Lazarus (Italian: Ordine dei Santi Maurizio e Lazzaro) is a de facto abolished Italian state order of merit and a Roman Catholic dynastic order granted by the House of Savoy. It is the second-oldest order of knighthood in the world, tracing its lineage to AD 1119. Formally established in 1572 through the merger of the religious-military Order of Saint Maurice and the ancient Hospitaller Order of Saint Lazarus of Jerusalem.

The Order operates under Italian law as a hospital corporation under the Region of Piedmont and as a foundation, managing historical properties such as the Palazzina di caccia of Stupinigi, the Sant'Antonio di Ranverso Abbey, and the Staffarda Abbey.

The private order, connected to the Savoy dynasty, has the office of Grand Master contested between Emanuele Filiberto di Savoia (the Savoy-Carignano order) and Aimone di Savoia (the Savoy-Aosta order), both claiming the Grand Magistry of the Order and the headship of the House of Savoy. The Savoy-Carignano order, operating as part of the Association of the Dynastic Orders of the Royal House of Savoy (A.I.C.O.D.S.), is estimated to include about 4,000 to 5,000 members worldwide.

Vectorized-type image of the order insignia

== History ==
=== Order of Saint Lazarus (1119) ===
The Order of Saint Lazarus, founded c. 1119, originated from a hospital for leprosy in Jerusalem established around 1100 by "Brothers of Saint Lazarus." These knights protected Christian pilgrims and specialized in the relief of leprosy; many members were themselves lepers who had been knights in other orders.

Following the Fall of Acre in 1291, the knights settled in France and later Naples (1311). In the 16th century, the order declined in wealth and credibility. During medieval times, the order maintained hospitals in several cities, including Capua. Until, with papal support, the Duke of Savoy became Grand Master in 1572.

=== Order of Saint Maurice (1434) ===
The Order of Saint Maurice was established in 1434 by Amedeo VIII of Savoy during his stay in the Ripaglia hermitage. It was a military order from its inception. Though it declined, it was reestablished in 1572 by Pope Pius V at the instigation of the then-Duke of Savoy.

=== Amalgamation (1572) ===
The green-enameled Maltese Cross of the Order of Saint Lazarus, founded c. 1119

The white-enameled cross bottony of the Order of Saint Maurice, founded in 1434

Combined Maltese Cross and cross bottony,
of the Order of Saints Maurice and Lazarus

In 1572, Pope Gregory XIII united the Order of Saint Lazarus in perpetuity with the Crown of Savoy. Duke Emmanuel Philibert merged it with the Order of Saint Maurice, making the Grand Mastership hereditary in the House of Savoy. The Pope granted the Duke authority over vacant commanderies globally, with the exception of those in the states of the King of Spain (the Kingdoms of Naples, Sicily, Sardinia, and the Duchy of Milan). In England and Germany, these commanderies were suppressed by the Protestant Reformation.

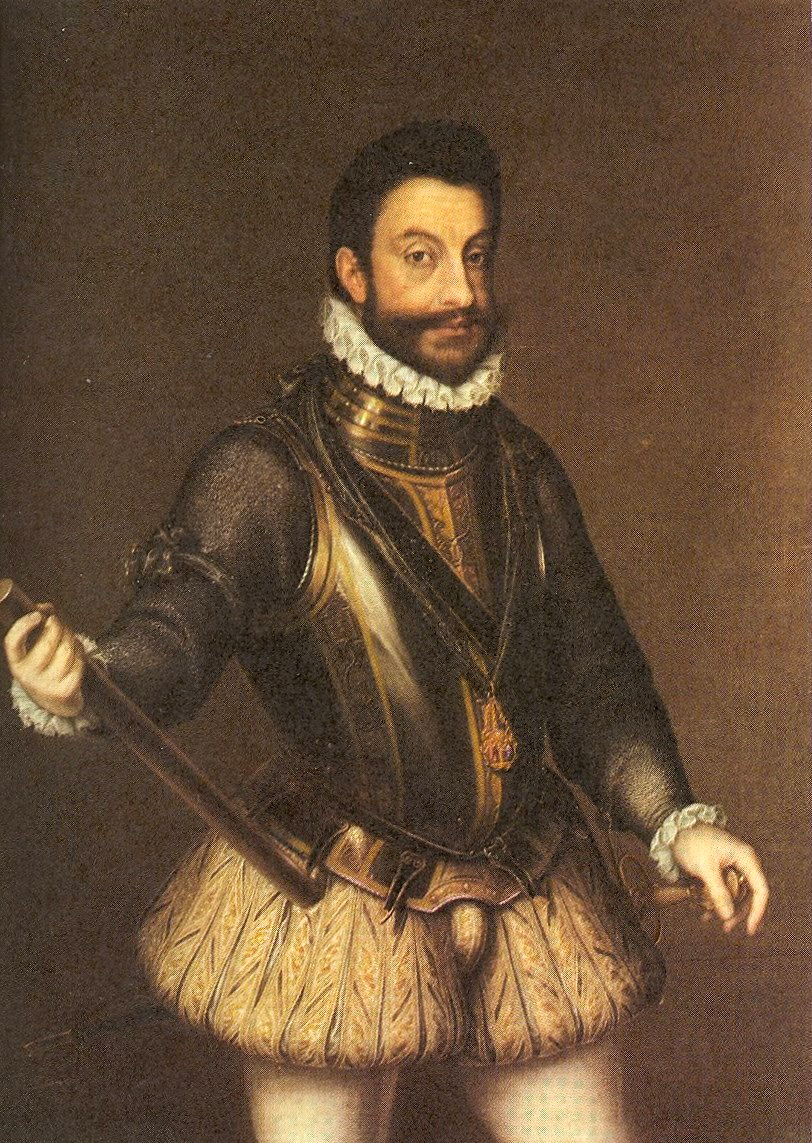
Emmanuel Philibert, Duke of Savoy (1528–1580), founder and first Grand Master General of the combined Order of Saints Maurice and Lazarus in recognition by Pope Gregory XIII

The new organization was charged to defend the Holy See and Italian shores. Notably, the order’s war galleys fought against the Ottoman Empire in the Battle of Lepanto and the Barbary pirates alongside the United States Marine Corps. In 1773, a hospital was founded in Aosta to combat a new outbreak of leprosy.

=== Napoleonic Wars and the 19th Century ===
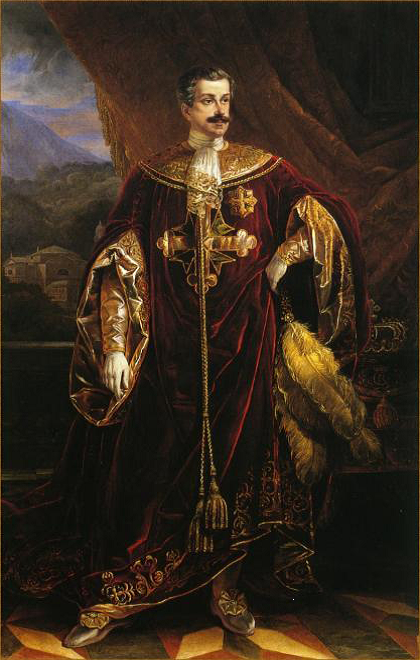
King Charles Albert of Sardinia in ceremonial robe

During the Napoleonic Wars, the order lost its estates in Piedmont. It accepted many officers of the Royal Sardinian Army and Navy, who in 1815 were bestowed with the Military Order of Savoy. In 1831, under Charles Albert of Sardinia, the order was opened specifically to members of the upcoming bourgeoisie.

King Victor Emmanuel II of Italy brought the order back into favor, conferring it sparingly for distinguished service as an exclusive award compared to the more common Order of the Crown of Italy. It consisted of five classes: Knight Grand Cross, Knight Grand Officer, Knight Commander, Knight Officer, and Knight. He bestowed the order on recipients eminent in the public service, science, art, letters, trade, and charitable works.

== Modern status ==
=== The State Order ===
After Italy became a republic in 1946, the order was effectively replaced by the Order of Merit of the Italian Republic as an order of merit. The 1948 Constitution, in its 14° transitory provision, "The Order of Saint Mauritius shall be preserved as a hospital corporation and shall function in the ways set forth by law." Its heritage and patrimony is conserved by the state in designated foundations and state corporations, which administer its real estate and hospital operations.

With law nr. 178 of 3 March 1951, art. 9 the Italian Republic ceased to grant membership in the Order, while grandfathering in past recipients. To this day, the Order has never been formally abolished by the Italian Republic. While the Italian government permits the wearing of decorations conferred prior to 1951, military regulations require that royal crowns on ribbons issued before 1946 be substituted with five-pointed stars on uniforms.

With law nr. 4 of 21 January 2005, the Order was divided in two entities: the Azienda Ospedaliera Ordine Mauriziano (Mauritian Order Hospital Corporation), which runs public hospitals under the Region of Peidmont, and the Fondazione Ordine Mauriziano (Mauritian Order Foundation), which owns and manages properties such as the Palazzina di caccia of Stupinigi, the Sant'Antonio di Ranverso Abbey, and the Staffarda Abbey, historically part of the Order's real estate portfolio. The Foundation's board of directors is composed of 3 members and is nominated by the Italian Prime Minister (whose appointee is the chairman of the board), by the Minister of Culture, and by the President of the Region of Piedmont.

The related Maurician Medal for military merit (est. 1839) was not placed in a moratorium by the Republic, and remains an official award routinely granted for long military careers.

=== The Dynastic Order ===
The descendants of the last kings of Italy continue to use the Order of Saints Maurice and Lazarus as a private order, granting it to individuals for merits in public service, science, art, letters, trade, and charitable works, or to other members of the House of Savoy. The Gran Magistry of the Order is disputed between the two claimants to the headship of the House of Savoy, Emanuele Filiberto di Savoia, which heads the Savoy-Carignano order, and Aimone di Savoia, which heads the Savoy-Aosta order. The Savoy-Carignano order, which is a part of the International Association of Dames and Knights of the Royal House of Savoy (A.I.C.O.D.S.), operates like a charitable organisation or a service club, rising funds for humanitarian and philanthropic causes. The American Foundation of the Savoy Orders, affiliated with the A.I.C.O.D.S., has roster consultative status in the UN ECOSOC.

==== Recognition ====
Notably, the Order of Saints Maurice and Lazarus as awarded by the House of Savoy is not formally recognised as a foreign or non-national order by any other country, including Italy and the Vatican. The Italian state explicitly lists the Order, as well as other awards granted by the House of Savoy, as "non-authorisable" non-national orders of chivalry, as opposed to other dynastic orders of chivalry, which are routinely granted authorisation. While this technically relegates the orders and the whole Savoy honours ecosystem to liability under prosecution from articles 7 and 8 of law n. 178 of 3rd march 1951, they are largely tolerated by Italian society, with civic, military and religious authorities often attending their events.

The Holy See formally states that it "recognizes and protects only the Sovereign Military Hospitaller Order of Saint John of Jerusalem, of Rhodes and of Malta, and the Equestrian Order of the Holy Sepulcher of Jerusalem" along its own orders. Furthermore, it "reaffirms that it attaches no value to knighthood diplomas and related insignia issued by unrecognized organizations and does not consider the use of churches and chapels for so-called ‘investiture ceremonies’ to be appropriate." However, there have been numerous instances of collaboration between individual high-ranking members of the Catholic hierarchy and the Savoy-Carignano order, such as Cardinal François Bustillo who serves as the Grand Prior of the orders, or Grand Master of the Order of Malta John Dunlap exchanging honours with Emanuele Filiberto di Savoia.

== Organisation ==
Historically, the knights were divided into:

- Knights of Justice: Required to prove nobility of eight great-grandparents.
- Knights of Grace: Not required to provide proof of nobility.

In 1851, Victor Emmanuel II abolished the category of Justice. Today, women can be appointed as Dames, and a new category of Knights and Dames of Devotion was introduced in 1988. The Grand Master may also appoint hereditary jus patronatus Commanders of Merit.

All knights were traditionally required to take three vows: obedience to the Grand Master; fidelity within marriage (castità almeno conjugale); and service to the sick and poor. In 1831, these vows became facultative.

=== Grades ===
Originally, the order was divided into Knights Petit Cross and Knights Grand Cross, the latter worn at the neck, the former on the chest. The Commendatori, who owned a commandery, weren't bestowed with a specific insignia. In 1831, Charles Albert of Sardinia divided the order into three classes:

- Knight Grand Cross with the Grand Cordon
- Knight Commander
- Knight

Since 1855, the Order is divided into five classes for the Knights (male members):

- Knight Grand Cordon, who wear a sash on the right shoulder to the left hip and the badge as well as star are worn on the left side;
- Grand Officer, who wear a necklet plus the star on the left chest;
- Commander, who wear a necklet;
- Officer, who wear a medal in Gold on the left side of the chest;
- Knight, who wear a smaller Medal in Silver on the left side of the chest.

For female members the Order is divided into in three classes:

- Dame Grand Cordon, wearing a sash similar to that of their male counterparts
- Dame Commander, who wear on a necklet. During daydress: wear a bow-formed necklet worn on the left side of the chest. During evening wear: bow formed necklet worn on the left side of the chest)
- Dame, who wear a smaller necklet; During daydress and evening wear: bow formed medal worn on the left side of the chest

Special Class of the Order:

- Knight Grand Cordon, Special Class, For the Grand Master of the Order; who wear a sash on the right shoulder to the left hip, the badge as well as star which is worn on the left side of the stomach are in Brilliants

=== Insignia ===
Insignia of the grades

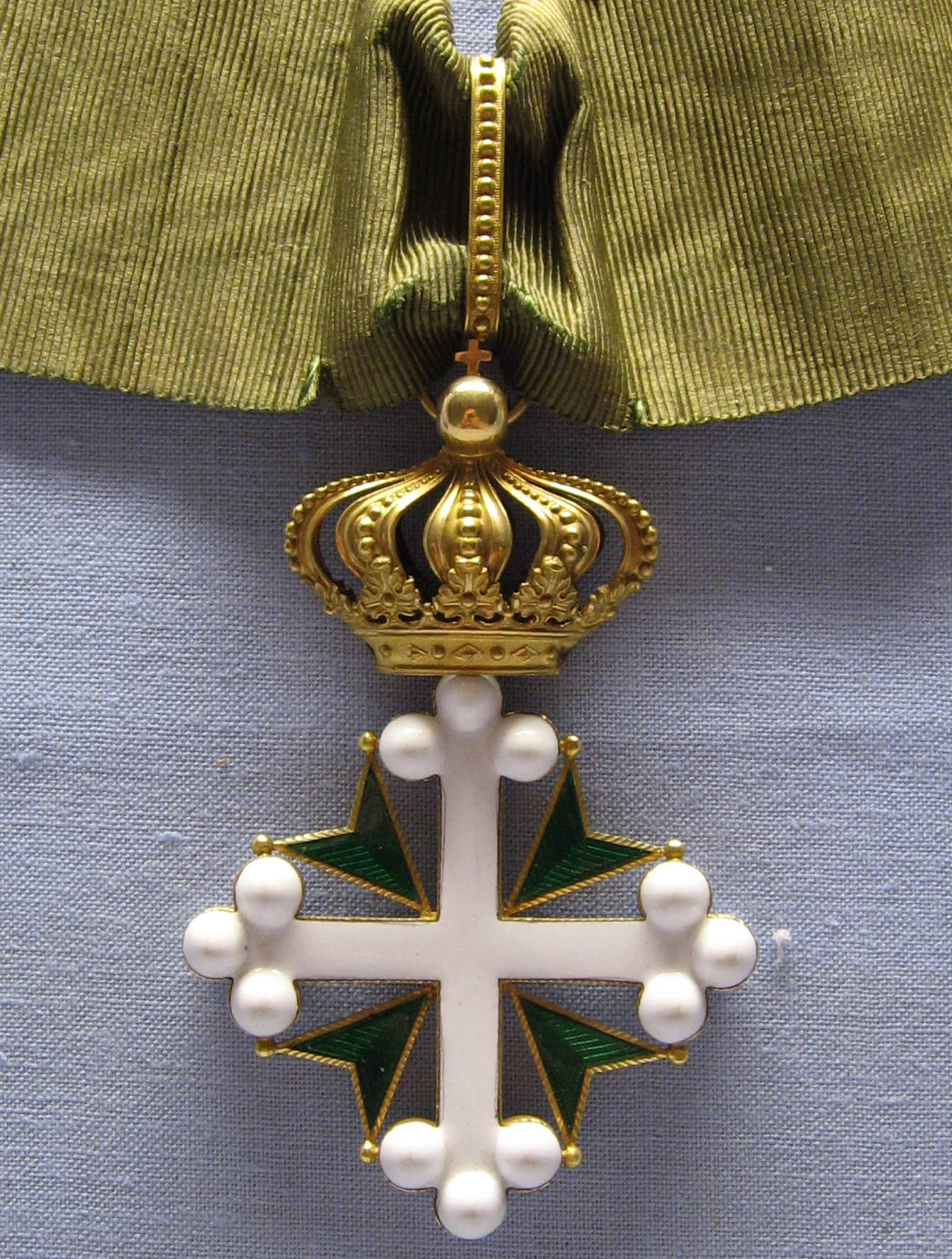
Insignia of a Commander of the Order of Saints Maurice and Lazarus

- The badge of the order is in gilt, consists of a white-enameled cross bottony of the Order of Saint Maurice, with a green-enameled Maltese Cross, the Cross of the Order of Saint Lazarus, placed in saltire between the arms of the cross botonny. The badge of each class except that of Knight and Dame is topped by a gilt crown.

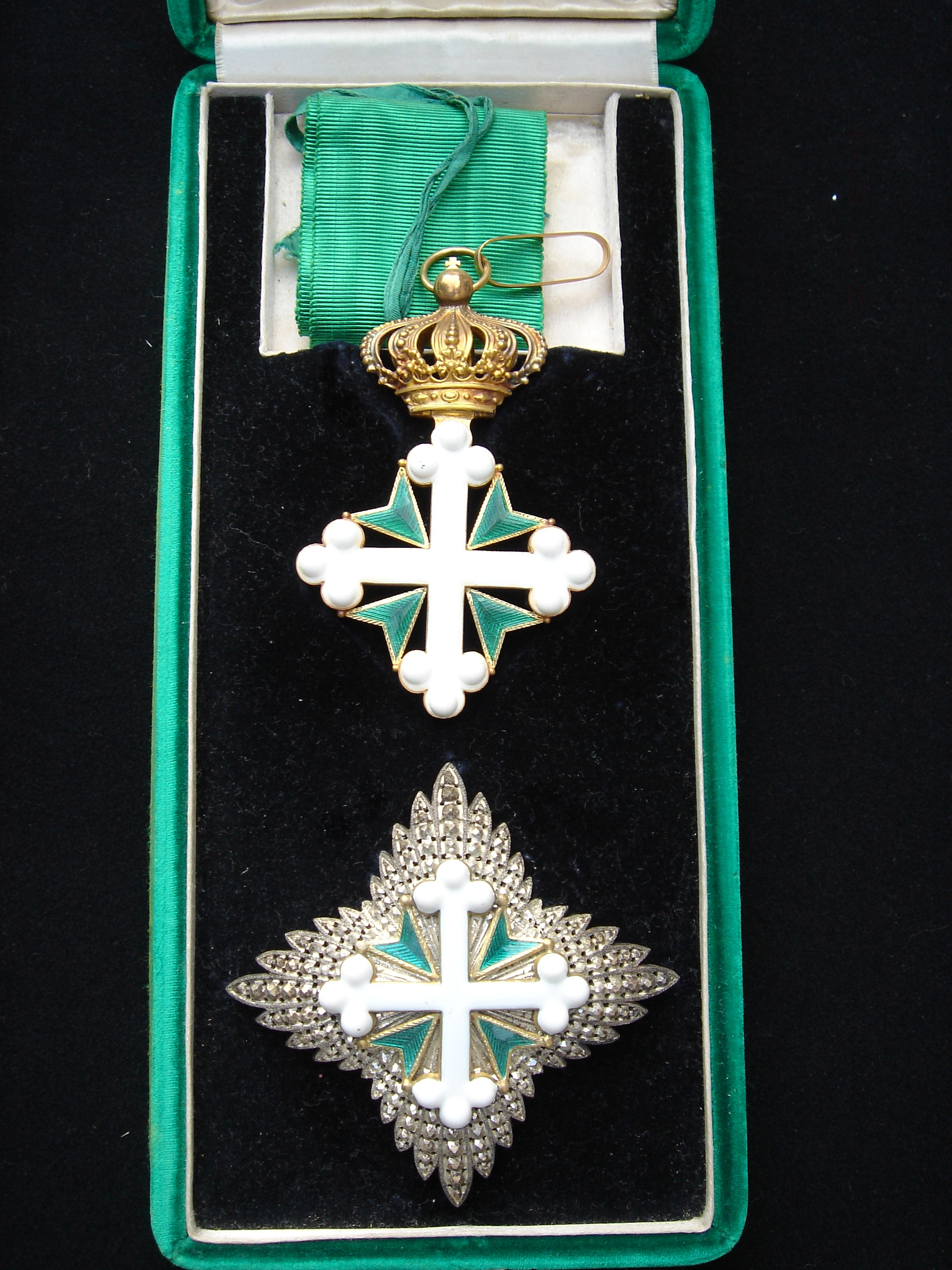
Insignia of a Grand Officer

- The star of the Order is a silver-faceted star, with eight points for Grand Cross and four points for Grand Officer, and with the badge (minus the crown) superimposed upon it.
- The breast cross for the "jus patronatus" Commander is identical to the badge, minus the crown.
- The ribbon of the Order is apple green, with slight variations for the several classes:

Ribbon	Class (English)	Full title in Italian
	Knight Grand Cross	Cavaliere di Gran Croce dell'Ordine dei Santi Maurizio e Lazzaro
	Grand Officer (until 1865 Commander First Class)	Grande Ufficiale dell'Ordine dei Santi Maurizio e Lazzaro
	Commander	Commendatore dell'Ordine dei Santi Maurizio e Lazzaro
	Officer	Ufficiale dell'Ordine dei Santi Maurizio e Lazzaro
	Knight	Cavaliere dell'Ordine dei Santi Maurizio e Lazzaro

=== Council ===
The council is responsible for running the order, the order focuses mainly on charitable acts.

Until 1831, it was composed of the First Secretary of the Grand Magistracy (not to be confused with the Secretary of the Council itself), the Auditor General and seven dignitaries (Grandati):

- Grand Prior, a clergyman with episcopal rank as the
- Grand Admiral, the commander of the order's navy
- Grand Marshal, the commander of the order's land forces
- Grand Hospitaller, administrator of the order's hospitals
- Grand Conservator, administrator of the order's estates
- Grand Chancellor, head of the order's chancery
- Grand Treasurer

In 1831, the offices of Grand Admiral and Grand Marshal were abolished since the absence of an army. In 1851, the offices of Grand Conservator and Grand Chancellor where merged with the office of the First Secretary of the Grand Magistracy and the Grand Treasurer got renamed as Treasurer General, who also served as Vice Chairman of the council. The other nine members, among them an annual Chairman of the council, who replaced the Grand Prior, where chosen by the Grand master.

From 1861 to 1946, the council also served as the council of the Order of the Crown of Italy.

Today, some of the old offices are re-established.

- Chairman: Vacant
- Vice Chairman: Antonio d’Amelio
- Grand Chancellor: Theo Niederhauser
- Grand Treasurer: Nicolas Gagnebin
- Grand Prior: Monsignor Paolo de Nicolò
- Grand Master of Ceremonies: Prof. Alberto Bochicchio
- H.S.H. Mariano Hugo, Prince of Windisch-Graetz
- H.S.H. Don Alessandro Jacopo Boncompagni Ludovisi Altemps
- Don Giancarlo Melzi d’Eril dei Duchi di Lodi
- Don Carlo Buffa dei Conti di Perrero – Honorary Member

=== Junta ===
The Junta is responsible for voting in new Knight or Dame to the dynastic order on behalf of the grand master, Emanuele Filiberto, Prince of Venice. There are always five members of the Junta to ensure that there is never an equal count in votes for and against a new possible new Knight or Dame.

- H.S.H. Don Alessandro Jacopo Boncompagni Ludovisi Altemps – President
- Don Paolo Thaon di Revel Vandini – Secretary
- Don Enrico Sanjust dei Baroni di Teulada
- Gualtiero Ventura
- Federico Pizzi

== List of Grand Masters ==
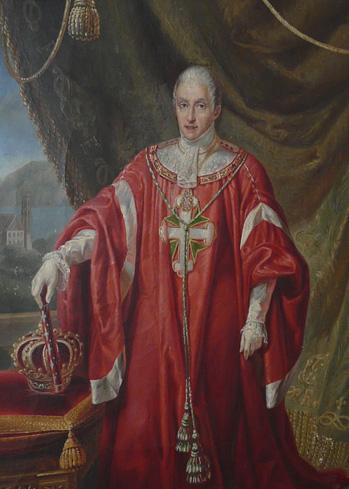
King and Grand Master Charles Felix of Sardinia in ceremonial robe of the Order of Saints Maurice and Lazarus

1. Emmanuel Philibert, Duke of Savoy (1572–1580)
2. Charles Emmanuel I, Duke of Savoy (1580–1630)
3. Victor Amadeus I, Duke of Savoy (1630–1637)
4. Francis Hyacinth, Duke of Savoy (1637–1638)
5. Charles Emmanuel II, Duke of Savoy (1638–1675)
6. Victor Amadeus II of Sardinia (1675–1731)
7. Charles Emmanuel III of Sardinia (1732–1773)
8. Victor Amadeus III of Sardinia (1773–1796)
9. Charles Emmanuel IV of Sardinia (1796–1802)
10. Victor Emmanuel I of Sardinia (1802–1824)
11. Charles Felix of Sardinia (1824–1831)
12. Charles Albert of Sardinia (1831–1849)
13. Victor Emmanuel II of Italy (1849–1878)
14. Umberto I of Italy (1878–1900)
15. Victor Emmanuel III of Italy (1900–1946)
16. Umberto II of Italy (1946–1983)
17. Vittorio Emanuele, Prince of Naples (1983–2024)
18. Emanuele Filiberto, Prince of Venice (2024–present)

== Notable recipients ==
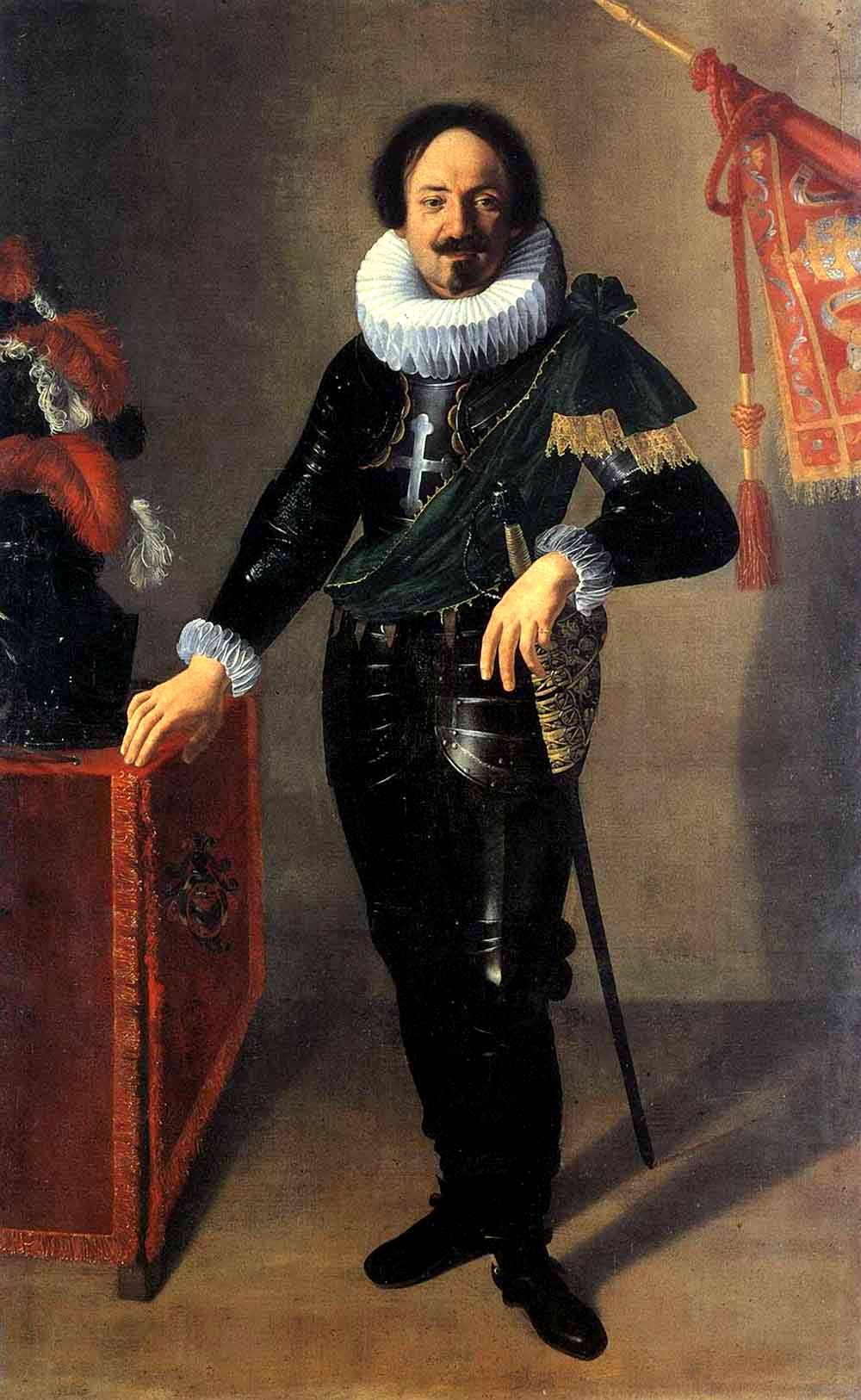
Portrait d'un gonfalonier (1622) painted by Artemisia Gentileschi, carrying the cross on the breast and the ribbon around the chest

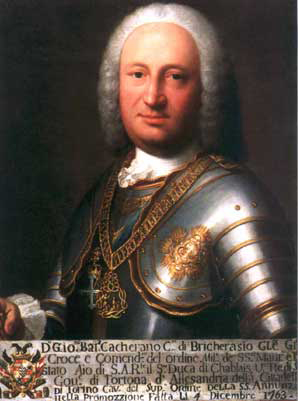
General Giovanni Battista Cacherano di Bricherasio, Knight Grand Cross of the Order of Saints Maurice and Lazarus

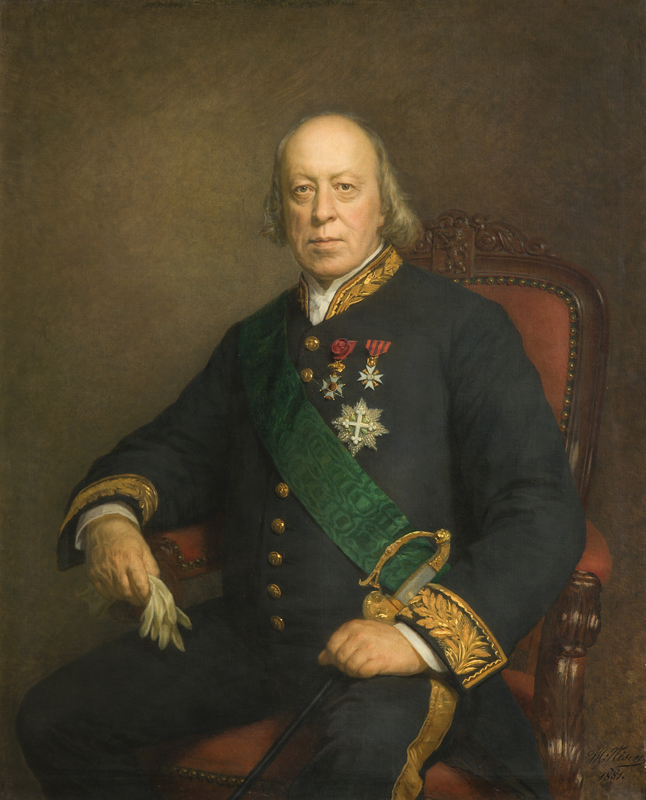
Edmond de Sélys Longchamps

=== Monarchs ===
- Franz Josef I, Emperor of Austria
- Wilhelm II, German Emperor
- Nicholas II, Emperor of Russia
- Gojong, Emperor of Korea
- Haile Selassie, Emperor of Ethiopia
- Zog I, King of the Albanians
- George V, King of the United Kingdom
- Mozaffar ad-Din Shah Qajar, Shah of Persia
- Mohammad Reza Pahlavi, Shah of Iran
- H.M.E.H. Servant of God Fra' Andrew Bertie, Prince and Grand Master of the Sovereign Military Order of Malta
- Maharaja Jagatjit Singh
- Maharaja Juddha Shumsher Jang Bahadur Rana
- Mihailo Obrenović of Serbia
- Abbas I, Wāli of Egypt

=== Heads of State ===
- Poglavnik Ante Pavelić Knight Grand Cross

=== Military ===
- General of the Armies John Pershing
- General of the Army George Marshall
- Marshal Slavko Kvaternik Knight Grand Cross
- Field Marshal Walther von Brauchitsch
- Field Marshal Francisco Solano López
- General Matthew Bunker Ridgway
- Lieutenant General John C. H. Lee
- General François d'Astier de La Vigerie
- General Tasker H. Bliss
- General Mark W. Clark
- General Ira C. Eaker
- General Peyton C. March
- Admiral Ernesto Burzagli
- Surgeon Rear-Admiral Arthur Skey
- Major General Ulysses S. Grant III
- Major General Mason Patrick
- General Sebastiano Visconti Prasca
- Rear Admiral Richard Byrd
- Brigadier General Billy Mitchell
- Naval Captain Emilio Faà di Bruno
- Flight Commander Douglas Harries
- SS-Obergruppenführer Hans Lammers
- Field Marshal Plaek Phibunsongkhram
- Brigadier General Evan M. Johnson
- Brigadier General Walter McCaw
- Rear Admiral Charles R. Train
- Contralmirante (Counter Admiral) Mateo García de los Reyes

=== Politics ===
- Antonio Profumo, 1st Baron Profumo (1788–1852)
- Vilhelm Sixten Gregorius Aminoff (1838-1875), Swedish diplomat and courier
- Diplomat Isaac Artom
- Tomáš Garrigue Masaryk, 1921
- Enrico d’Arienzo, Prefect of Caltanisetta 1925
- Henri Jaspar
- Charles, 1st Count de Broqueville
- Charles Rogier
- Edmond, Baron de Sélys Longchamps
- President Porfirio Díaz
- Dr Hans Frank, 26 September 1936
- Minister of foreign affairs Giustino Fortunato
- Member of Parliament Cristiana Muscardini
- Diplomat Jose Maria Quijano Wallis
- Luigi, Count Cibrario
- Oswald, Freiherr von Richthofen, State Secretary for Foreign Affairs of the German Empire - August 1902 - during the visit to Germany of King Victor Emmanuel III of Italy
- President of the 1904 Louisiana Purchase Exposition and Former St. Louis Mayor David R. Francis
- Mayor Rudolph Giuliani of New York City (2001) Cavaliere di Gran Croce (Motu Proprio)
- Aldo Oviglio, Minister of Justice (1922–1925)
- James Charles Risk of New York City, Cavaliere di Gran Croce, originally inducted by the last reigning King of Italy, Umberto II of Italy
- Benito Mussolini, Prime Minister of Italy and Duce of Fascism
- Francesco Ruffini, Italian jurist, historian, politician and antifascist.
- Mike Gatto, American politician of Italian heritage
- Gianni Letta, Italian politician and journalist

=== Culture ===
- Architect Carlo Rainaldi
- Architect Giovanni Battista Meduna and his brother, engineer Tommaso Meduna
- Sculptor Christopher Ross
- Tenor Andrea Bocelli
- Poet Henry Wadsworth Longfellow rejected the honor
- Painter Giuseppe Frascaroli

=== Priests ===
- Pietro Tacchi Venturi
- Agostino Cardinal Rivarola
- Blessed Tommaso Reggio
- Timothy Michael Cardinal Dolan
- Désiré-Félicien-François-Joseph Cardinal Mercier
- Blessed Andrea Carlo Cardinal Ferrari

=== Sciences ===
- Charles Combes
- Giovanni Miani, explorer
- Giuseppe Peano
- Joseph Vallot

=== Philanthropy ===
- Edoardo Gabardi
- Thomas Hanbury
- J. P. Morgan

== Recipients (amongst others) ==
- Emanuele Filiberto of Savoy, Prince of Venice, Knight Grand Cross
- Clotilde Courau, Princess of Venice
- Princess Vittoria of Savoy, Princess of Carignano Marchioness of Ivrea
- Princess Luisa of Savoy
- Marina Doria, Princess of Naples and Duchess of Savoy
- Princess Maria Pia of Bourbon-Parma
- Princess Maria Gabriella of Savoy
- Princess Maria Beatrice of Savoy
- Prince Dimitri of Yugoslavia
- Prince Michael of Yugoslavia
- Prince Sergius of Yugoslavia
- Princess Helen of Yugoslavia
- Nicholas, Crown Prince of Montenegro
- Prince Carlo, Duke of Castro
- H.S.H. Mariano Hugo, Prince of Windisch-Graetz Knight Grand Cross
- H.S.H. Don Alessandro Jacopo Boncompagni Ludovisi Altemps Knight Grand Cross
- Don Paolo Thaon di Revel Vandini Knight Grand Cross
- Don Enrico Sanjust dei Baroni di Teulada Knight Grand Cross
- Prof. Alberto Bochicchio Knight Grand Cross
- Don Carlo Buffa dei Conti di Perrero Knight Grand Cross
- Don Giuseppe dei Conti Rizzani Knight Grand Cross
- Don Giancarlo dei Duchi Melzi d'Eril Knight Grand Cross
- Don Andrea dei Conti Boezio Bertinotti Alliata
- Giovanni Cheli Grand Cross
- Antonio d’Amelio Grand Cross
- Monsignor Paolo de Nicolò Grand Cross
- Nicolas Gagnebin Grand Cross
- Theo Niederhauser Grand Cross
- Andrea Rivoira Grand Cross
- Franca Sciaraffia Grand Cross
- Luigi Acquaviva Grand Officer
- Giuseppe Resnati Grand Officer
- Sir William Worsley, 6th Baronet Grand Officer
- Marcus Worsely Commander
- Zina Losapio Dame
- Esteban Campodónico Knight
- Gino Lupini Knight

== See also ==
- List of Italian orders of knighthood
- Dynastic order of knighthood
- Order of Merit of the Italian Republic
- La Fléchère family
