= Alberto Giovannetti =

Italian Priest

Alberto Giovannetti (1913 – 1989) was an Italian priest of the Catholic Church who worked in the Roman Curia and served as the first Permanent Observer of the Holy See to the United Nations from 1964 to 1973.

== Biography ==
Alberto Giovannetti was born in Monterotondo, Rome, in 1913.

In preparation for a career in the diplomatic service, he completed the course of study at the Pontifical Ecclesiastical Academy in 1940. He worked in the offices of the Section for Relations with States of the Secretariat of State and was a peritus, that is, a designated expert, at the Second Vatican Council.

As a Vatican historian, he published works defending Pope Pius XII for failing to denounce the Holocaust. Writing in the official Vatican newspaper L'Osservatore Romano in 1963, he said that "the enormous dimensions and monstrous cruelty [the Jews suffered] were apparent in their full sinister light only after the war. The information about these crimes that reached the Vatican was scarce and vague...and was based on revelations and news that even those who conveyed it could not guarantee."

Though most of his work in Rome and as a diplomat in New York was not carried out in public, he developed a reputation for skill and acuity. Late in his career Time magazine described him as "deceptively cherubic". Early in 1964, when the government of China said that the peace strategy of Pope Paul and his two predecessors was nothing more than "chloroforming the world", Giovannetti chose to accept that assessment as a compliment, writing in L'Osservatore Romano: "It is with surprise that we see the Chinese Communists affirm the existence of a perfect identity of intent and action in the last three Popes in the field of the fundamental problem of peace."

The Vatican state department notified U.N. Secretary General U Thant that Giovannetti would be its first Permanent Observer at the United Nations on 21 March 1964. Giovannetti met with Thant for the first time on 21 September. His only public role came with the visit of Pope Paul to address to United Nations General Assembly in 1965, for which he also managed behind-the-scenes negotiations, preventing the trip from taking on a political cast and allowing local Church officials a role. His duties extended to U.N. agencies as well, in this era before the Holy See had an observer in Geneva with that responsibility; he led a delegation to a United Nations Trade Conference there in April 1964. As both a priest and diplomat, Giovannetti continued to perform certain pastoral duties, officiating, for example, at the wedding of a U.N. official from Dahomey, attended by that country's president.

Pope Paul appointed Giovanni Cheli to succeed Giovannetti at his U.N. position in 1973. Like Giovannetti, Cheli was not yet a bishop when appointed; the policy of giving diplomats of a certain rank the status of archbishop was established later.

In retirement Giovannetti authored a spy novel that appeared in Italian as Requiem per una spia in 1978 and in an English translation as Requiem for a Spy in 1983. Its cover carried the description "a novel about a false priest and a true faith". (Note: "Seeking information about Arab and Israeli plans, the KGB substitutes agent Vladimir Panin for his double, Monsignor Righi, the Vatican observer at the United Nations")

== Writings ==
- Pio XII parla alla Chiesa del Silenzio (in Italian). Milan: Editrice Ancona. 1958.
- Il Vaticano e la guerra: 1939-1940; note storiche (in Italian). Libreria editrice vaticana. 1960.
- Il Palazzo è di vetro [The palace is made of glass] (in Italian). Coines. 1975.
- Roma, città aperta. Rome: Ancora. 1962.
- Italians of America. Manor Books. 1979. Originally L'America degli Italiani (Edizioni Paoline, 1975), Series: Problemi sociali d'oggi, volume 10.
- Requiem for a Spy. Translated by Lanza, Frances Frenaye. Doubleday. 1983. Originally Requiem per una spia (1978)
- Strada facendo in America. Quasi un Diario (in Italian). Monterotondo: Tipolithografia Balzanelli Aldo. 1988.
