= Esteban Campodónico =

Peruvian physician and philanthropist

Dr. Esteban Campodónico
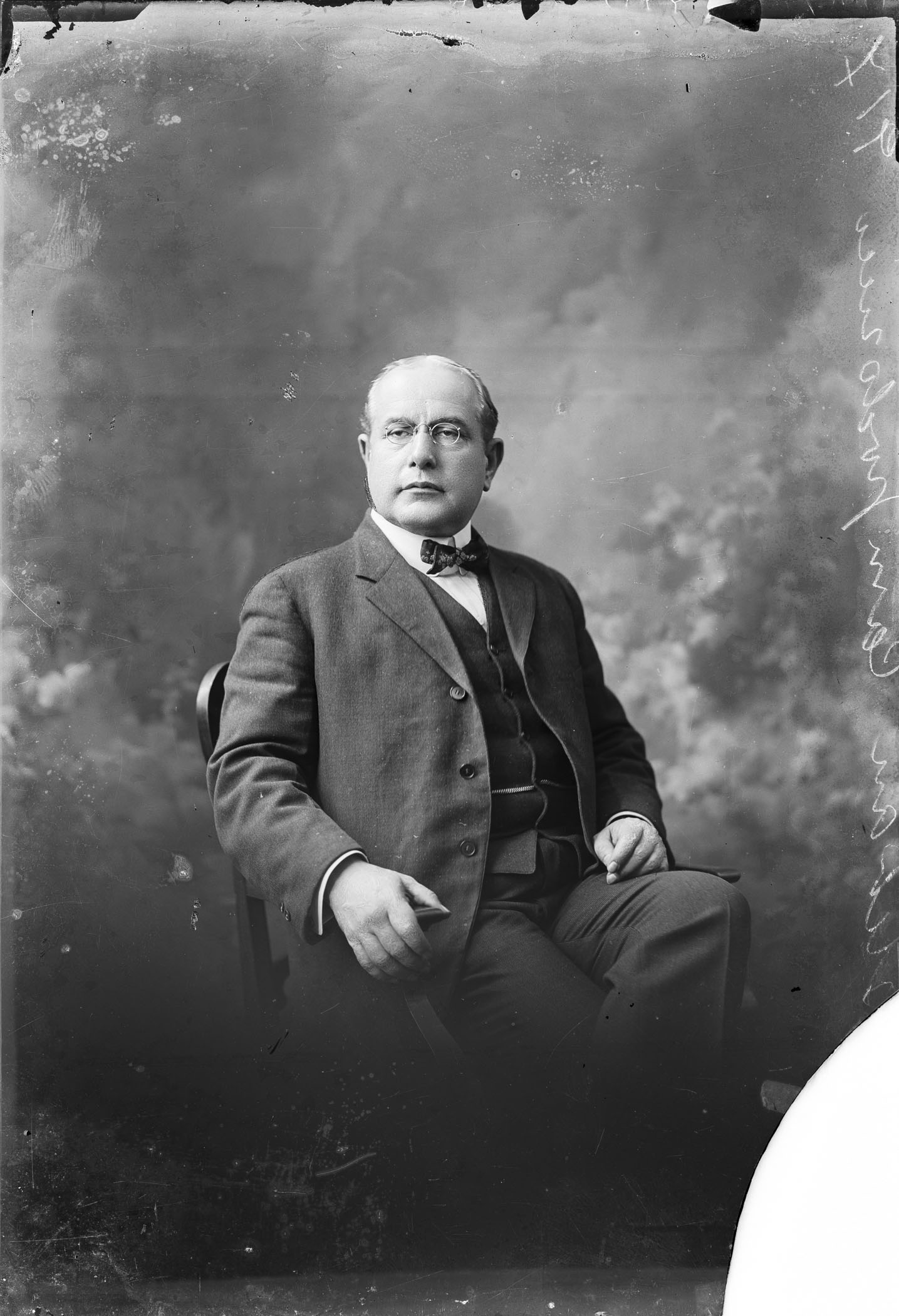
- Photograph of Esteban Campodónico (1917)
- Born: Stefano Campodonico; August 2, 1866; Chiavari, Liguria, Kingdom of Italy
- Died: October 23, 1938 (aged 72); Ancón, Panama Canal Zone
- Resting place: Cementerio Presbítero Matías Maestro
- Citizenship: Italian and Peruvian
- Education: Universidad Nacional Mayor de San Marcos, Lima, Peru
- Occupations: Medical doctor, university professor
- Spouse: Ethel C. Graff (m. 1938)

Esteban Campodónico (August 2, 1866 – October 23, 1938) was a Peruvian medical doctor, university professor, and philanthropist. He left a monetary legacy that funds the annual Esteban Campodónico Prize for an individual or organization that has benefited Peruvian society by their work.

== Early life and education ==
Stefano Campodonico was born in Chiavari, Italy, on August 2, 1866, to Michele Campodonico, an Italian businessman, and Angela Figallo. He was the eldest of their nine children, and the only son. When he was 13, the family emigrated to Peru, settling in Lima. His Italian given name of Stefano was adapted to Spanish as Esteban, and an accent was placed on his surname according to Spanish orthography. In 1880 he enrolled in the Seminary of Santo Toribio de Mogrovejo to complete his primary and secondary education.

Campodónico studied medicine at the National University of San Marcos in Lima from 1887 to 1896. He pursued a specialization in ophthalmology at the University of Bologna in Italy in 1908, and another in radiology at the University of Vienna in 1909. In 1917 and 1918, he traveled to the United States for internships in ophthalmology and radiology at hospitals in Philadelphia and New York.

== Medical and teaching career ==
Campodónico opened a private practice in 1895, where he continued to see patients for some forty years, till near the end of his life. In 1898, he began working in the ophthalmology department of the Italian Hospital Victor Emmanuel II in Lima, and became director of the hospital in 1906. He also taught in the School of Medicine of the University of San Marcos, becoming an adjunct professor in 1916. He was promoted to professor of the newly created department of radiology in 1923, and continued as a professor at the university until 1930. Interestingly, he helped train three of his nephews: Carlos Brignardello who became an ophthalmologist and radiologist like himself; Julio Raffo who became his successor in the Italian Hospital; and Ernesto Raffo, who became an otolaryngologist.

He pioneered the practice of radiology in Peru, and imported his own X-ray apparatus, which he used in his private practice. He wrote a textbook Radiología Clínica (Clinical Radiology), which appeared in 1923. During his career he traveled frequently to medical and scientific conferences in the Americas and Europe and wrote numerous scholarly as well as popular articles. For instance, in 1909 while in Italy for his specialization in ophthalmology, he represented Peru at the Congress of Ophthalmology in Naples, and spoke about the Italian community of Peru at the First Congress of Italians Living Abroad, held in Rome. He was a member of the American College of Surgeons.

== Philanthropy ==
Throughout his life, Campodónico displayed a serious commitment to public service. According to his great niece, already during the Peruvian civil war of 1894–1895, Campodónico and his fellow medical students, as volunteers, attended to the wounded on both sides of the conflict. In 1893 he joined the Italian Welfare and Assistance Society in Lima, which served the Italian immigrant community. Also, during his years working in the Italian Hospital he operated an ophthalmology clinic free of charge to the needy. In 1914–1915 and again in 1922–1924 he served as a councilor for the city of Lima. He played a major role in a campaign by the Public Welfare Society of Lima to eliminate tuberculosis in 1931–1934, and donated an X-ray apparatus to that organization to assist in diagnosis.

== Honors and awards ==
In 1909 he was made a Knight of the Order of the Crown of Italy, reaching the grade of Commander in 1922; in 1928 he was appointed by Pope Pius XI to the Order of St. Gregory the Great; and in 1932 he was appointed Knight of the Order of Saints Maurice and Lazarus for his contribution to Ophthalmology and Radiology.

A street in the La Victoria district of Lima, Peru has been named in his honor.

== Final years and legacy ==
Campodónico participated in various businesses and investments with his relatives in Peru, and became quite wealthy. He had no children, but most of his sisters were married and had children. In August 1937 he established in his will that his assets would be left to his relatives, except for a trust fund deposited at what was then City Bank Farmers Trust Company of New York (now Citibank). This trust fund would be used to award a series of annual prizes for contributions to the advancement of Peruvian society. However, a complication intervened that would lead to a delay of more than five decades in the establishment of the prize. Later that year, he traveled to the United States, and while there (although a lifelong bachelor up to that point), on June 30, 1938 he married Ethel C. Graff, a socialite from Oakland, California. It is not known how they met, but his family members speculate that they met when both were traveling, and kept up a correspondence by letter for several years prior to their engagement. He amended his will to provide for her support after his death from the earnings of the trust fund. In October the couple took a steamer from New York for Lima. During the voyage, Campodónico contracted bronchial pneumonia. He was taken to the Gorgas Hospital in the Panama Canal Zone and died there on October 23, 1938 at the age of 72.

Campodónico's widow was 52 at the time of his death, and lived until 1984. Following her death, Citibank began efforts to implement the terms of his will regarding the prizes. The first Esteban Campodónico Prize was awarded in 1995, and the prizes have been awarded annually since then.
