= Audience (meeting) =

Formal meeting between a head of state and another person

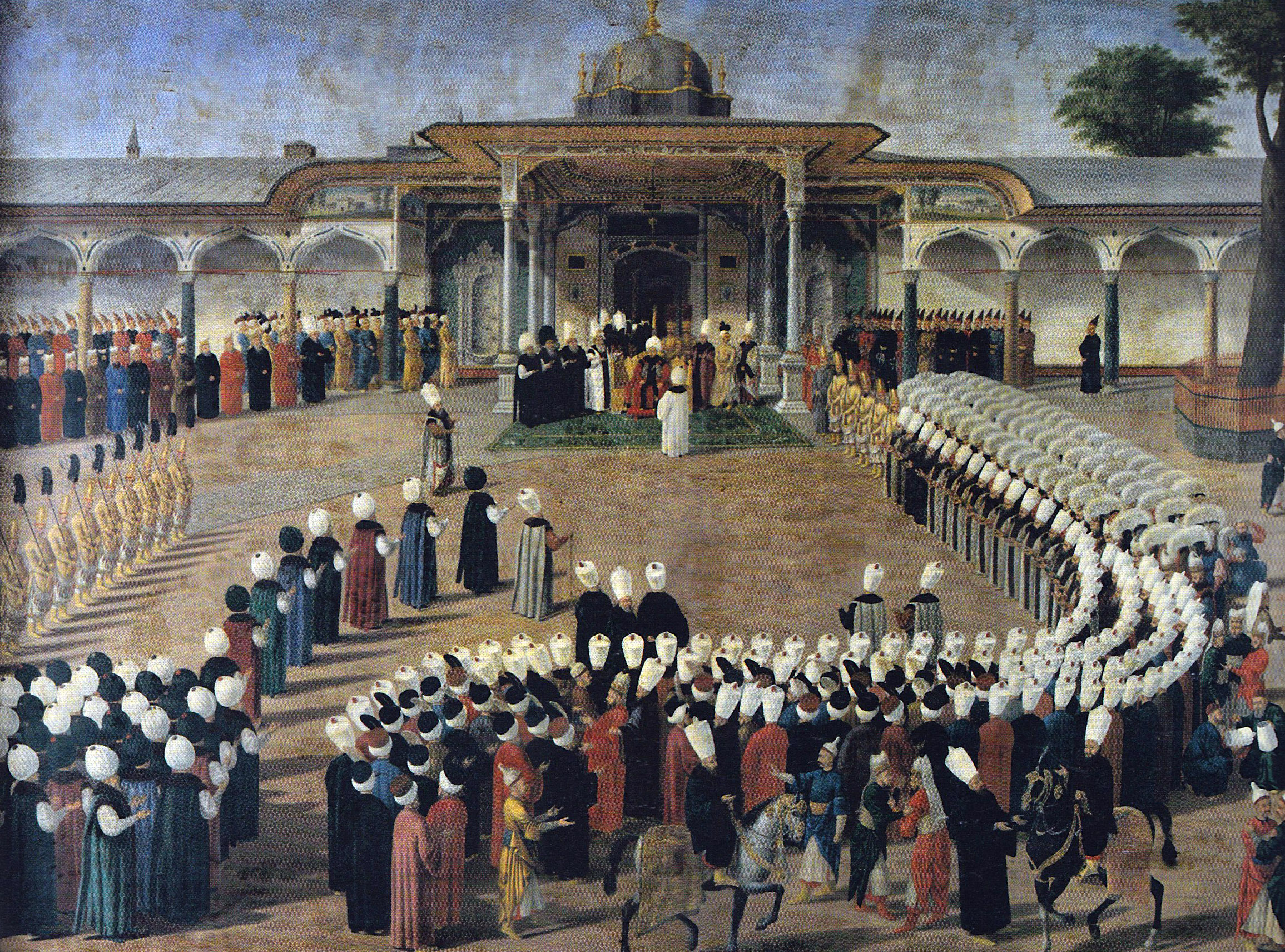
Audience of the French diplomat le Vicomte d'Andrezel with the Sultan Ahmed III on 10 October 1724 in the Topkapı Palace.

An audience is a formal meeting that takes place between a head of state and another person at the invitation of the head of state. Often, the invitation follows a request for a meeting from the other person. Though sometimes used in republics to describe meetings with presidents, the term is more usually associated with monarchs and popes.

== Denmark ==
In the Kingdom of Denmark, public audiences with the King usually take place every other Monday at Christiansborg Palace. An invitation is not required for public audiences. Private audiences of the King with heads of state, heads of government, parliamentary delegations, leaders of international organisations and military leaders are usually held at the residence palace of the Monarch at Amalienborg Palace.

== Holy See ==
In the past, rigid dress codes had to be followed by those granted a papal audience. For a general audience, smart business professional attire (technically, informal wear, that is, a suit and tie or equivalent for ladies) was acceptable. The suit was to be dark, and ladies would ideally not wear slacks anywhere in the Vatican. Private audiences, however, were a much more formal affair. Ladies were to wear a long (well below the knees), black dress, with a matching hat or other head covering and veil. Exceptions were made for Catholic queens who by dispensation could wear white (privilège du blanc). Gentlemen were to wear a correct morning suit, either black or very dark gray with the traditional striped trousers, patent leather shoes, and cutaway. An ascot or equivalent formal tie would be worn with a gray waistcoat over a white dress shirt with arrow collars. If any part of the audience were to occur outdoors, a black top hat would be worn. If the function were entirely indoors, then the hat was optional for men. Both gentlemen and ladies were to wear dress gloves. Evening functions were usually white tie.

Formal dress is now normally reserved for diplomatic audiences. In the 1990s, an Irish Catholic priest provoked a controversy by claiming that the president of his country, Mary Robinson, had breached protocol by wearing jewellery and by not wearing black nor a mantilla for an audience with Pope John Paul II. The Vatican subsequently stated that the traditional form of dress worn for papal audiences was no longer obligatory.

Modern popes grant large audiences to crowds in St. Peter's Square or the Paul VI Audience Hall.

== Spain ==
In the Kingdom of Spain, it is common for the Spanish monarch, the prince or princess of Asturias, and their respective consorts, to receive in audience representatives of the business, cultural, social, political and diplomatic sectors. As an example, according to the compilation presented by the Royal Household on the occasion of the 10th anniversary of the marriage of the Prince and Princess of Asturias, between 22 May 2004 and 22 May 2014 they together held 248 audiences, in which they have seen more than 7,200 people. Alone, Prince Felipe held 571 audiences for 10,850 people while the Princess Letizia held 107 audiences for 2,100 people. In the first decade of their reign (2014–2024), both sovereigns held 3,208 audiences for 25,033 people. These audiences usually take place at the Zarzuela Palace.

In addition, the prime minister holds private audiences with the monarch and a special audience at Palace of Marivent during holidays.

== United Kingdom ==
In the United Kingdom, audiences with the British monarch are usually listed in the Court Circular, which is published daily by the broadsheet press. The Prime Minister has a weekly audience with the monarch usually every Wednesday, during parliamentary time at Buckingham Palace.
