= Princess Vittoria of Savoy =

Member of the House of Savoy (born 2003)

- Born: 28 December 2003 (age 22); Geneva, Switzerland
Names
- Vittoria Cristina Adelaide Chiara Maria di Savoia
- House: Savoy
- Father: Emanuele Filiberto, Prince of Venice
- Mother: Clotilde Courau
- Religion: Catholicism

Princess Vittoria of Savoy (Vittoria Cristina Adelaide Chiara Maria di Savoia; born 28 December 2003) is the daughter and heir apparent to Emanuele Filiberto of Savoy, Prince of Venice, who is a claimant to the headship of the House of Savoy.

As the succession laws of the House of Savoy only permitted males to succeed in their domains, a woman succeeding to the headship of the House of Savoy is unprecedented. In 2019, Vittorio Emanuele, Vittoria's grandfather, proclaimed that the laws of the House of Savoy were to be changed, and Vittoria was placed as second in line to the headship of the house of Savoy, behind her father.

Vittoria is the first female member of the Supreme Order of the Most Holy Annunciation, which was established in 1362.

== Early life and family ==
Vittoria was born on 28 December 2003 in Geneva, Switzerland. Her father Emanuele Filiberto, Prince of Venice was then the disputed heir apparent to the Italian throne and her mother Clotilde Courau is a French actress. Her younger sister Luisa was born in 2006. She is the granddaughter of Vittorio Emanuele, Prince of Naples, the disputed head of the House of Savoy, and his wife Marina Doria. Her great-grandfather, King Umberto II, was the last King of Italy before the monarchy was abolished in a 1946 referendum. Her great-grandmother was Marie-José of Belgium, the last Queen of Italy.

=== Baptism ===
She was baptized on 30 May 2004 by cardinal Giovanni Cheli at the Basilica of San Francesco d'Assisi in Assisi. Her godparents were Ottavio Mazzola and Roberta Fabbri. The baby wore the baptismal gown that had been worn by her great-great-grandfather King Vittorio Emanuele III at his baptism on 30 November 1869. Among the guests were Prince Albert of Monaco, Princess Maria Beatrice of Savoy, Prince Sergius of Yugoslavia and Princess Mafalda of Hesse, granddaughter of Princess Mafalda of Savoy. The parents selected Assisi in light of its symbolism of peace.

== Later life and education ==
Vittoria briefly lived in Switzerland and Italy, but grew up in Paris where she got her baccalauréat in 2021.

Afterwards she settled in London to study politics, but dropped out college after a few months, and instead worked as waitress in a pub, in the Thaddaeus Ropac London Gallery, and briefly as a model, most notably by doing shooting for the Spanish magazine Yo Dona in 2024, and as the spokesmodel for the Marmo collection of Pucci on 4 April 2025 in Portofino.

== Acting career ==
With those jobs, she earned enough money to pay the tuition to take acting classes.

In May 2025, she began her acting career by shooting two episodes of the French TV series La Mère et l'Assassin, which was released on 11 January 2026.

In 2025, she also got the lead role in the French movie Toi+moi, which was released on Amazon Prime Video on 18 September 2026.

== Succession ==
In 2019 Vittoria's grandfather, Vittorio Emanuele, Prince of Naples, changed the rules of succession which previously only allowed males to be the heir to the throne. Under the rule changes, Vittoria, as the firstborn child of her father, will one day succeed him as the disputed head of the House of Savoy. Her parents had never produced a male heir but had two daughters. Despite being the disputed heir to the now-defunct Italian throne, she lives in Paris in neighbouring France. The current line of succession within the House of Savoy is disputed by Prince Aimone, 6th Duke of Aosta., a descendant of Victor Emmanuel II's younger son, Amadeo I of Spain. The origins of the dispute stem from Vittorio Emanuele, Prince of Naples's marriage to Marina Doria, which Aimone's father, Amadeo claimed was done without the permission of Umberto II, therefore excluding Vittorio Emanuele and all of his descendants from succeeding to the headship of the House of Savoy.

In June 2023, her father Emanuele Filiberto, Prince of Venice announced he would renounce his claim as disputed heir apparent in favour of Vittoria; however, he has yet to formally do so. If he does, that would make Vittoria the claimed Duchess of Savoy and disputed head of the House of Savoy pretender to the throne of Italy.

On 8 October 2023, she was made a member of the Supreme Order of the Most Holy Annunciation, being the first female ever to be admitted into the order, which was established in 1362.

== Honours ==
- (Kingdom of Italy) House of Savoy: Knight of the Supreme Order of the Most Holy Annunciation (06/10/2023)
- (Kingdom of Italy) House of Savoy: Knight Grand Cross of the Royal Order of Saints Maurice and Lazarus (2021)
- Sovereign Military Order of Malta: Knight Grand Cross of the Order of Merit (27/09/2023)
- (Empire of Brazil) House of Orleans-Braganza (Petropolis Branch): Grand Cross Effective of the Imperial Order of the Rose (2025)
