= Emanuele Filiberto of Savoy, Prince of Venice =

Disputed Head of the House of Savoy since 2024

Emanuele Filiberto
- Prince of Venice
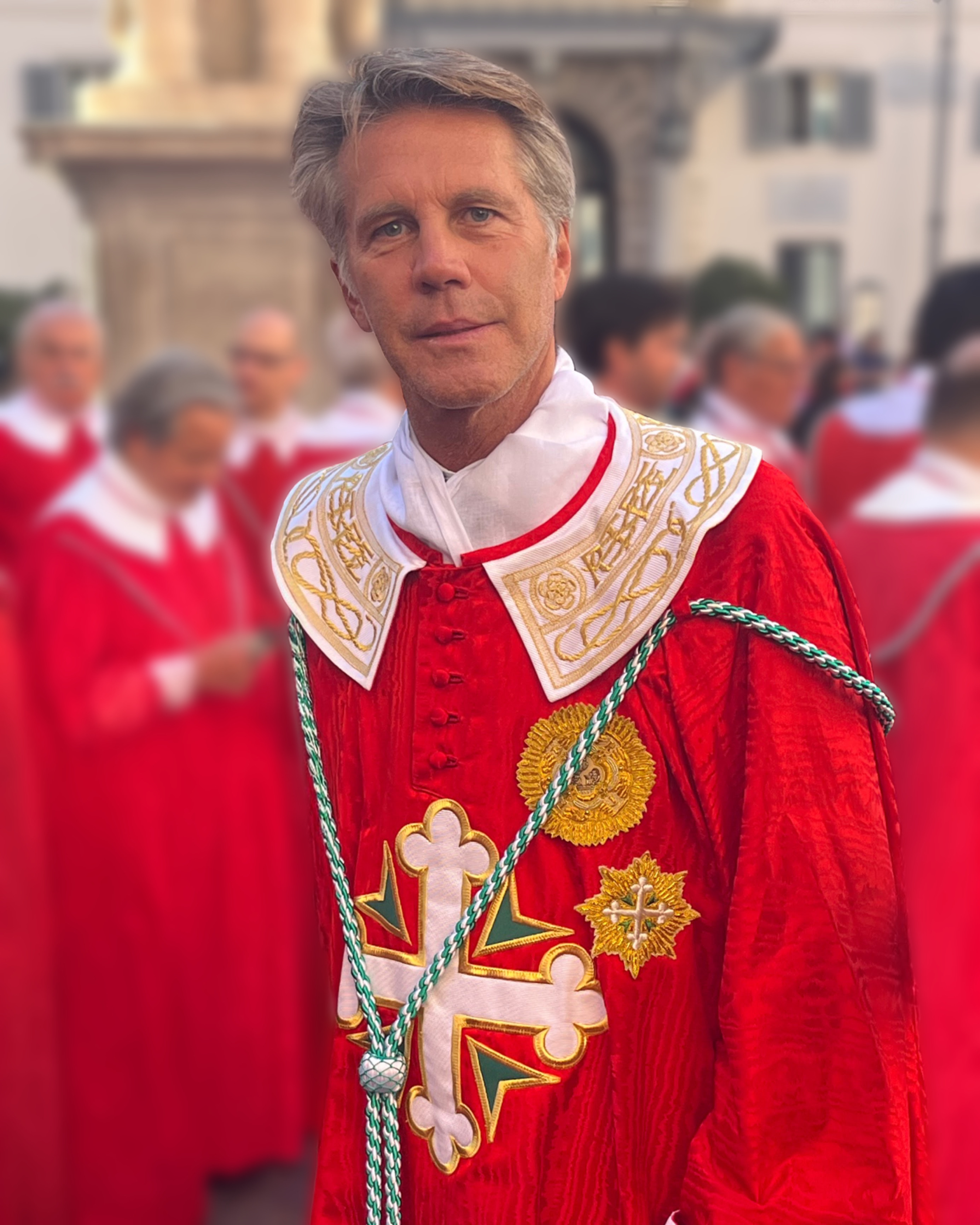
- Emanuele Filiberto in 2025

Head of the House of Savoy (disputed)
- Period: 3 February 2024 – present
- Predecessor: Prince Vittorio Emanuele
- Heir apparent: Princess Vittoria
- Born: 22 June 1972 (age 54); Geneva, Switzerland
- Spouse: Clotilde Courau (m. 2003; sep. 2021)
- Issue: Vittoria, Princess of Carignano; Princess Luisa
Names
- Emanuele Filiberto Umberto Reza Ciro René Maria di Savoia
- House: Savoy
- Father: Vittorio Emanuele, Prince of Naples
- Mother: Marina Doria

Emanuele Filiberto of Savoy, Prince of Venice (Emanuele Filiberto Umberto Reza Ciro René Maria di Savoia; born 22 June 1972) is a member of the House of Savoy. He is the son of Vittorio Emanuele of Savoy and male-line grandson of Umberto II, the last King of Italy. In 2024, Emanuele Filiberto became one of two claimants to the headship of the House of Savoy after the death of his father.

Emanuele Filiberto grew up in exile since the Italian constitution at the time prohibited the male issue of the Savoy kings of Italy from entering or staying on Italian territory. Since returning to Italy following the lifting of the ban in 2002, he has made many appearances on national television, including his participation as a contestant in Ballando con le stelle (the Italian version of Dancing with the Stars), and the Sanremo Music Festival.

In 2003, he married French actress Clotilde Courau. In March 2025, he announced that the couple had been living separately since 2021.

== Early life and family ==
Emanuele Filiberto was born in Geneva, Switzerland, the only child of Vittorio Emanuele, Prince of Naples, a claimant to the headship of the House of Savoy, and his wife, Marina Doria, a Swiss former water ski champion. Through his paternal grandmother, Marie-José of Belgium, Emanuele Filiberto is a second cousin of King Philippe of Belgium and Grand Duke Henri of Luxembourg and a third cousin to Franz, Duke of Bavaria. Through his paternal grandfather, Umberto II of Italy, Filiberto is a first cousin once removed of former Tsar Simeon II of Bulgaria.

On 10 November 2002, he accompanied his father and mother to Italy, following revocation of the provision in the Italian constitution that forbade the male Savoy descendants of kings of Italy from setting foot in the country. On the three-day trip, he accompanied his parents on a visit to the Vatican City for a twenty-minute audience with Pope John Paul II. He also appeared in a television commercial for a brand of olives, in which he said they made you "feel like a king".

On 25 September 2003, he married Clotilde Courau, a French actress, in Rome. The best man was Albert II, Prince of Monaco; among the 1,200 guests were Valentino Garavani – who had designed the wedding dress – and Pierre Cardin.

In 2007, Filiberto formally requested that the Italian Republic pay him financial damages of 90 million euros. The claim is based on suffering moral injustice during the exile, and was filed along with his father's request for 170 million euros. The government of Italy rejected the demand and, in response, indicated that it may seek damages for historic grievances.

As of 2022, Emanuele Filiberto has been leading an effort to gain ownership of the Savoyard Royal Regalia as the private property of the House of Savoy. However, he has said that he will not make a similar claim to the Italian Crown Jewels, as "they are no longer ours". The jewels are estimated to be worth $335 million and have been held by the Italian government since the abolition of the monarchy in 1946.

=== Controversies ===
In October 2009, the Italian news agency ANSA reported that Filiberto had stated that he had abused drugs in his youth.

In 2015, Emanuele Filiberto engaged in a public spat on Twitter with aristocratic journalist Beatrice Borromeo who broke the story of his father's confession on a video regarding the death of Dirk Hamer. Vittorio Emanuele had sued the newspaper for defamation, but in 2015 after it won the case, Borromeo tweeted ''Vincere una causa è sempre piacevole, ma contro Vittorio Emanuele di Savoia la goduria è doppia! ("Winning a case is always nice, but against Victor Emmanuel of Savoy there is double the pleasure"), and "caro @efsavoia goditi questa sentenza" ("dear @efsavoia enjoy this judgement") which provoked Emanuele Filiberto to defend his father. She had earlier confronted him on camera with a copy of a book on the murder by Hamer's sister, whose preface she had written.

In 2018, following the release of polling data by the Istituto Piepoli that showed fifteen per cent of Italians favoured the formation of a royalist party and eight per cent supported him as future king, Emanuele Filiberto said he was contemplating the launch of a political party to advocate for the restoration of the monarchy in Italy.

== Titles, styles and honours ==
Emanuele Filiberto is, by strict primogeniture in the male-line, the heir apparent of the House of Savoy, Italy's former ruling dynasty. In June 2006 his distant cousin Amedeo, 5th Duke of Aosta, declared himself to be head of the house and rightful Duke of Savoy, maintaining that Vittorio Emanuele had forfeited his dynastic rights when he married Emanuele Filiberto's mother, Marina Ricolfi Doria, in 1971 without the legally required permission of his father and sovereign-in-exile, Umberto II. Emanuele Filiberto and his father applied for judicial intervention to forbid Amedeo from using the title Duke of Savoy. In February 2010, the court of Arezzo ruled that the Duke of Aosta and his son must pay damages totalling 50,000 euros to their cousins and cease using the surname Savoia instead of Savoia-Aosta. The Duke of Aosta appealed the ruling and the dynastic dispute was still unresolved as of 2014.

=== Succession ===
In June 2023, Emanuele Filiberto announced his intention to abdicate his claim to the throne in favour of his daughter, Princess Vittoria of Savoy, when he felt she was ready to succeed.

On 3 February 2024, Emanuele Filiberto became one of two claimants to the headship of the House of Savoy, after the death of his father, Vittorio Emanuele.

=== Dynastic orders ===
Recognition of Emanuele Filiberto as grand master of the Savoy dynastic orders, a position claimed by the head of the House of Savoy, is tied to the dynastic succession dispute within the family.

- House of Savoy: Supreme Order of the Most Holy Annunciation – Grand Master, since 3 February 2024.
- House of Savoy: Order of Saints Maurice and Lazarus – Grand Master, since 3 February 2024.
- House of Savoy: Civil Order of Savoy – Grand Master, since 3 February 2024.
- House of Savoy: Order of Merit of Savoy – Grand Master, since 3 February 2024.

=== Foreign orders ===
- Sacred Military Constantinian Order of Saint George: Bailiff Knight Grand Cross of Justice (2003).
- Order of Saint-Charles (Monaco): Grand Officer (1 March 2003).
- Sovereign Military Order of Malta: Knight of the Grand Cross of Honour and Devotion (Rome, 27 September 2023).
- Royal House of Georgia: Grand Collar of the Order of the Eagle of Georgia and the Seamless Tunic of Our Lord Jesus Christ (Rome, 7 October 2024).
- Brazilian Imperial House (Petrópolis branch): Grand Cross of the Order of Pedro I (Rome, 27 September 2025).
- Russian Imperial House: Knight of the Imperial Order of Saint Alexander Nevsky (20 January 1994; publicly exchanged again in Rome on 27 September 2025).
- House of Mecklenburg-Strelitz: Grand Cross of the House Order of the Wendish Crown (Rome, 27 September 2025).
- Royal House of Rwanda: Grand Collar of the Royal Order of the Drum.

=== Other recognitions ===
- Badge of the Advisory Council of the Kingdom's Senators.

=== Honorary citizenships ===
- Sarnano, Province of Macerata: honorary citizenship (24 June 2000).
- Valdieri, Province of Cuneo: honorary citizenship (22 September 2024).

=== Honorary title ===
- Kentucky Colonel

Emanuele Filiberto of Savoy, Prince of Venice House of Savoy Born: 22 June 1972
Italian royalty
| Preceded by Prince Vittorio Emanuele | Head of the House of Savoy; 3 February 2024 – present Disputed by Aimone di Savoia Aosta | Incumbent; Heir: Vittoria, Princess of Carignano |
Titles in pretence
| Preceded by Prince Vittorio Emanuele | — TITULAR — King of Italy; 3 February 2024 – present Reason for succession failure: Monarchy abolished in 1946 | Incumbent; Heir: Vittoria, Princess of Carignano |
