= Privilège du blanc =

Privilege for female Roman Catholic royalty

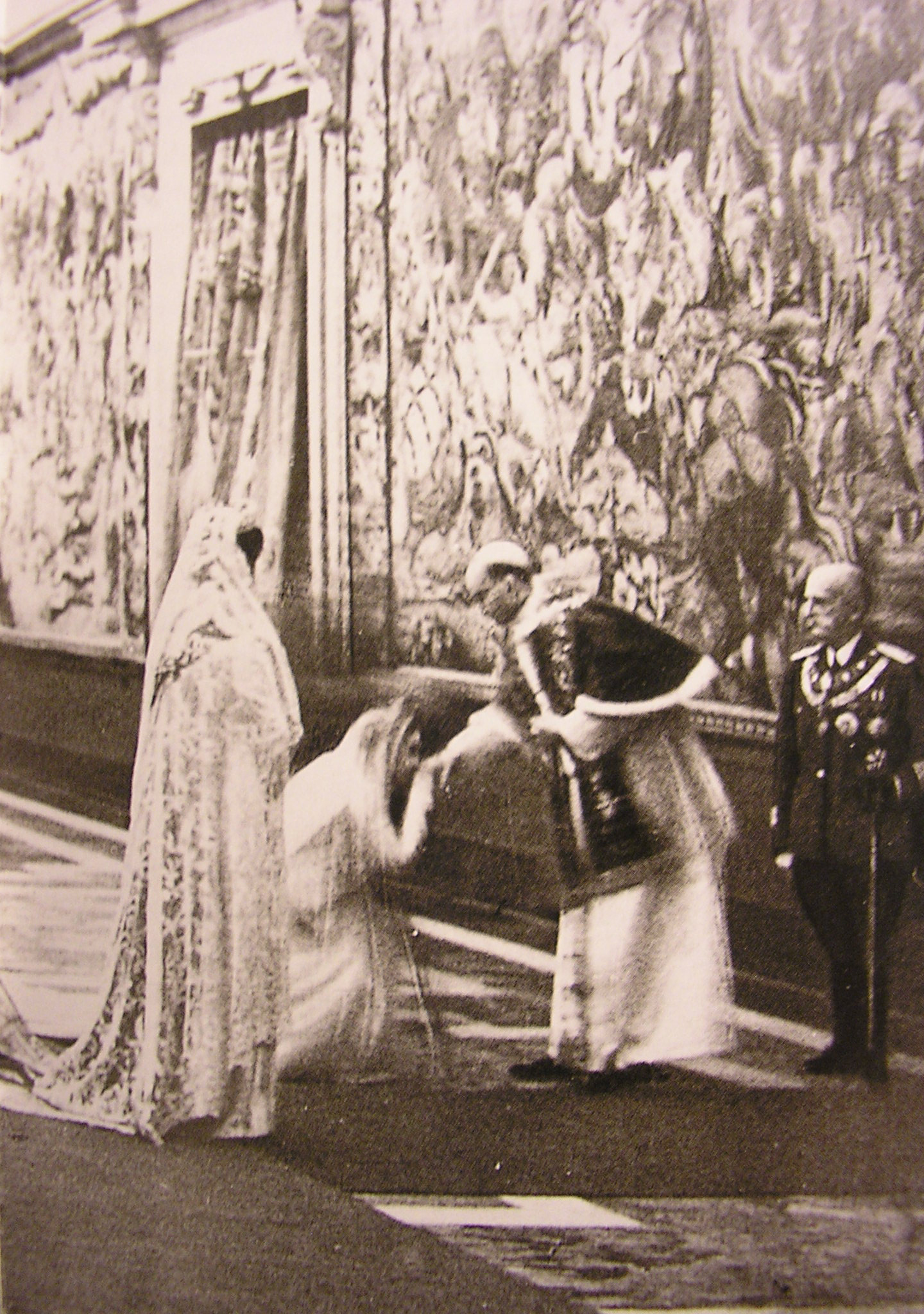
Queen Elena of Italy and Crown Princess Marie-José wearing white garments in the presence of Pope Pius XII at the Quirinal Palace on 27 December 1939.

The privilège du blanc (pronounced [lə pʁivilɛʒ dy blɑ̃]; "the privilege of white") is a custom of the Catholic Church that permits certain designated female royalty to wear white clothing (traditionally a white dress and white veil) during an audience with the pope. It is an exception to the traditional requirement of women to wear black garments on formal occasions.

== History ==
Protocol for papal audiences traditionally requires women to wear a black dress with sleeves and no cleavage, as well as a black mantilla or scarf for the head.

Certain designated Catholic queens and princesses have nonetheless traditionally been exempted from wearing black garments. Those permitted to wear white garments include the Queen of Spain, the Queen of the Belgians, the Grand Duchess of Luxembourg, the Princess of Monaco, and the princesses of the House of Savoy. The privilege is not used by the wives of all Catholic monarchs or by the Catholic wives of non-Catholic monarchs, such as Queen Máxima of the Netherlands, who is the Catholic wife of the Protestant King Willem-Alexander. Even though they are Catholics, it is not accorded to the Queen of Lesotho, the Princess of Liechtenstein, the Afro-Bolivian Queen, nor the Māori Queen.

== List of eligibility ==
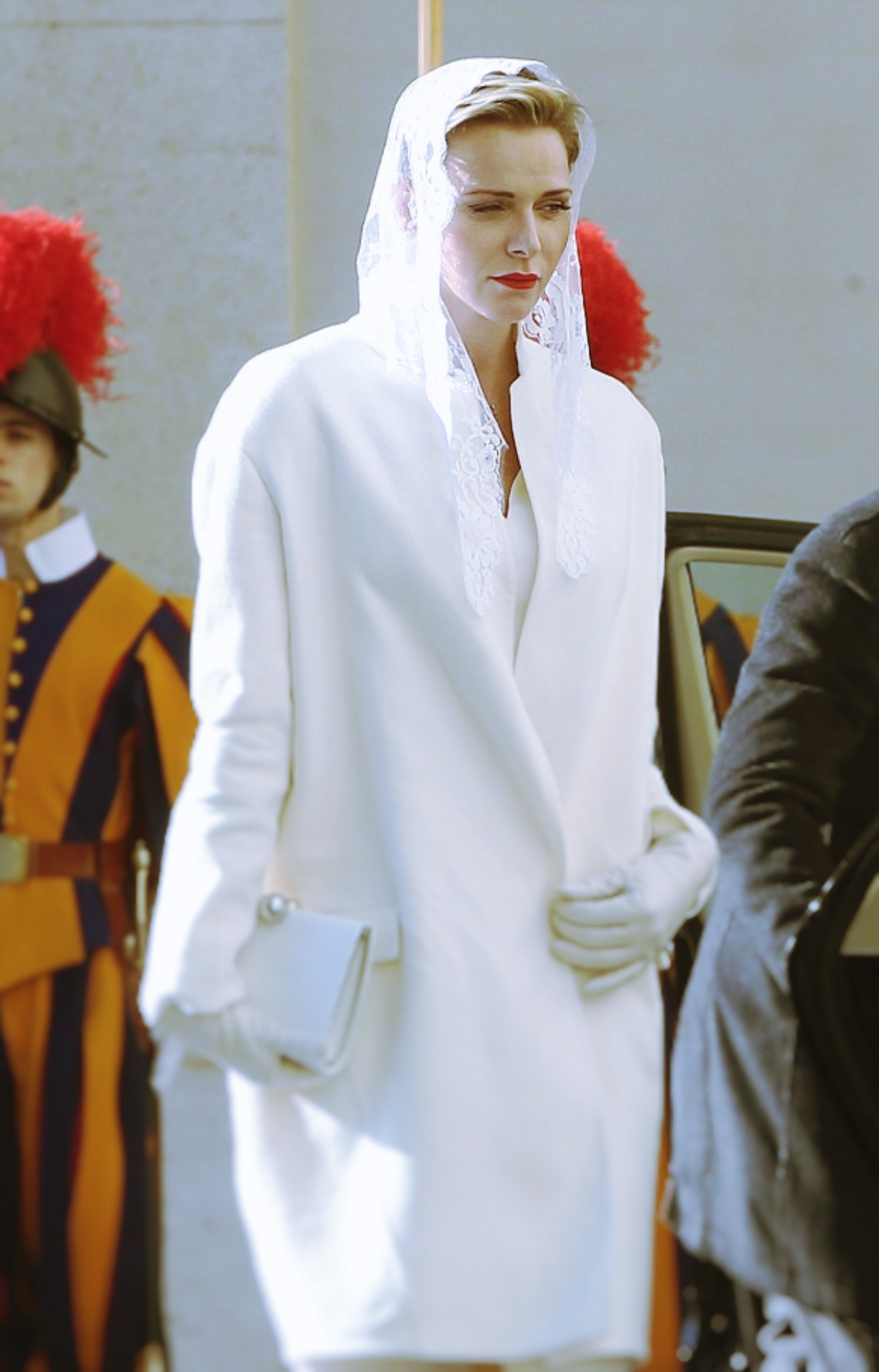
Charlene, Princess of Monaco, exercising the privilege during a meeting with Pope Francis on an official state visit to the Vatican in 2016

As of 2026, the following living royal women are eligible for the privilege:

- Queen Sofía, wife of Juan Carlos I, King of Spain (since 1975)
- Princess Marina, widow of Vittorio Emanuele, Crown Prince of Italy (since 1983)
- Queen Paola, wife of Albert II, King of the Belgians (since 1993)
- Grand Duchess Maria Teresa, wife of Henri, Grand Duke of Luxembourg (since 2000)
- Princess Charlene, wife of Albert II, Prince of Monaco (since 2013)
- Queen Mathilde, wife of Philippe, King of the Belgians (since 2013)
- Queen Letizia, wife of Felipe VI, King of Spain (since 2014)
- Grand Duchess Stéphanie, wife of Guillaume V, Grand Duke of Luxembourg (since 2025)
- Princess Gabriella of Monaco, daughter of Albert II, Prince of Monaco (since 2026)

== In recent years ==
Marina, Princess of Naples, wife of the former Head of the House of Savoy, Vittorio Emanuele, Prince of Naples, exercised the privilege on 18 May 2003 during a Catholic Mass marking the birthday of Pope John Paul II, of whom she had a private audience the day before.

For the first time in Monégasque history on 12 January 2013, Charlene, Princess of Monaco, used the privilege in an audience with Pope Benedict XVI. The Holy See Press Office later issued a press release declaring the following:

"... in accordance with prescribed ceremonial of the Vatican for Catholic sovereigns, the princess [of Monaco] was allowed to dress in white."

Charlene exercised the privilege once again on 18 January 2016 when visiting Pope Francis as part of an official state visit to the Vatican with her husband, Albert II, Prince of Monaco.

On 28 March 2026, Princess Gabriella of Monaco and her mother (Princess Charlene) used the privilege during Pope Leo XIV's visit to Monaco.

== List of occasions used ==
Among the occasions when the privilège du blanc has been exercised are:

Date	Catholic Royalty	Pontiff	Occasion
2026 September 28	Charlene, Princess of Monaco; Stéphanie, Grand Duchess of Luxembourg	Leo XIV	State visit to France
2026 June 8	Queen Sofía of Spain	Leo XIV	State visit to Spain
2026 June 6–10	Queen Letizia of Spain	Leo XIV	State visit to Spain
2026 March 28	Charlene, Princess of Monaco; Princess Gabriella of Monaco	Leo XIV	State visit to Monaco
2026 March 20	Queen Letizia of Spain	Leo XIV	Private audience
2026 January 23	Stéphanie, Grand Duchess of Luxembourg	Leo XIV	Private audience
2025 October 27	Queen Mathilde of Belgium	Leo XIV	Private audience
2025 May 18	Queen Mathilde of Belgium; Queen Letizia of Spain; Maria Teresa, Grand Duchess of Luxembourg; Charlene, Princess of Monaco	Leo XIV	Inauguration of Pope Leo XIV
2024 September 27	Queen Mathilde of Belgium	Francis	State visit to Belgium
2023 September 15	Queen Mathilde of Belgium	Francis	Private audience
2018 October 14	Queen Sofía of Spain	Francis	Canonization of Pope Paul VI
2016 September 4	Queen Sofía of Spain	Francis	Canonization of Saint Teresa of Calcutta
2016 March 21	Maria Teresa, Grand Duchess of Luxembourg	Francis	Private audience
2016 January 18	Charlene, Princess of Monaco	Francis	State visit to the Vatican
2015 March 9	Queen Mathilde of Belgium	Francis	Private audience
2014 June 30	Queen Letizia of Spain	Francis	State visit to the Vatican
2014 April 27	Queen Paola of Belgium; Queen Sofía of Spain; Grand Duchess Maria Teresa of Luxembourg	Francis	Canonization of Pope John XXIII and Pope John Paul II
2013 March 19	Queen Paola of Belgium; Maria Teresa, Grand Duchess of Luxembourg	Francis	Inaugural Mass of Pope Francis
2013 January 12	Charlene, Princess of Monaco	Benedict XVI	Private audience
2011 May 1	Queen Paola of Belgium; Maria Teresa, Grand Duchess of Luxembourg	Benedict XVI	Beatification of Pope John Paul II
2009 October 10	Queen Paola of Belgium	Benedict XVI	Private audience
2006 May 8	Maria Teresa, Grand Duchess of Luxembourg	Benedict XVI	Private audience
2005 April 24	Queen Sofía of Spain; Maria Teresa, Grand Duchess of Luxembourg	Benedict XVI	Inaugural Mass of Pope Benedict XVI
2004 October 3	Queen Fabiola of Belgium	John Paul II	Beatification of Charles I of Austria
2003 May 18	Marina, Princess of Naples	John Paul II	Birthday of Pope John Paul II
2003 March 23	Maria Teresa, Grand Duchess of Luxembourg; Princess Alexandra of Luxembourg	John Paul II	Private audience
1998 May 15	Queen Paola of Belgium	John Paul II	Private audience
1981 April 30	Queen Sofía of Spain	John Paul II	Private audience
1978 October 22	Josephine Charlotte, Grand Duchess of Luxembourg; Queen Sofía of Spain	John Paul II	Inaugural Mass of Pope John Paul II
1978 September 3	Fabiola, Queen of the Belgians; Queen Sofía of Spain; Josephine Charlotte, Grand Duchess of Luxembourg	John Paul I	Inaugural Mass of Pope John Paul I
1977 February 10	Queen Sofía of Spain	Paul VI	Private audience
1965 May 6	Josephine Charlotte, Grand Duchess of Luxembourg	Paul VI	Private audience
1961 June 9	Fabiola, Queen of the Belgians	John XXIII	Private audience
1939 December 28	Queen Elena of Italy; Marie-José, Princess of Piedmont	Pius XII	Papal visit to the Quirinal Palace
1939 January 23	Princess Maria Francesca of Savoy	Pius XI	Private audience after wedding
1935 March 4	Emanuela de Borbón, Duchess of Anjou and Segovia	Pius XI	Private audience after wedding
1930 January 8	Marie-José, Princess of Piedmont	Pius XI	Private audience after wedding
1929 December 28	Princess Adelaide of Savoy	Pius XI	Private audience
1929 December 7	Princess Giovanna of Savoy; Princess Maria Francesca of Savoy	Pius XI	Private audience
1929 December 5	Queen Elena of Italy; Princess Hélène of Orléans; Elisabeth, Queen of Belgium; Princess Maria Cristina of Bourbon-Two Sicilies	Pius XI	Private audience after signing of the Lateran Treaty
1923 November 19	Queen Victoria Eugenia of Spain	Pius XI	Private audience
