= Clotilde Courau =

French actress (born 1969)

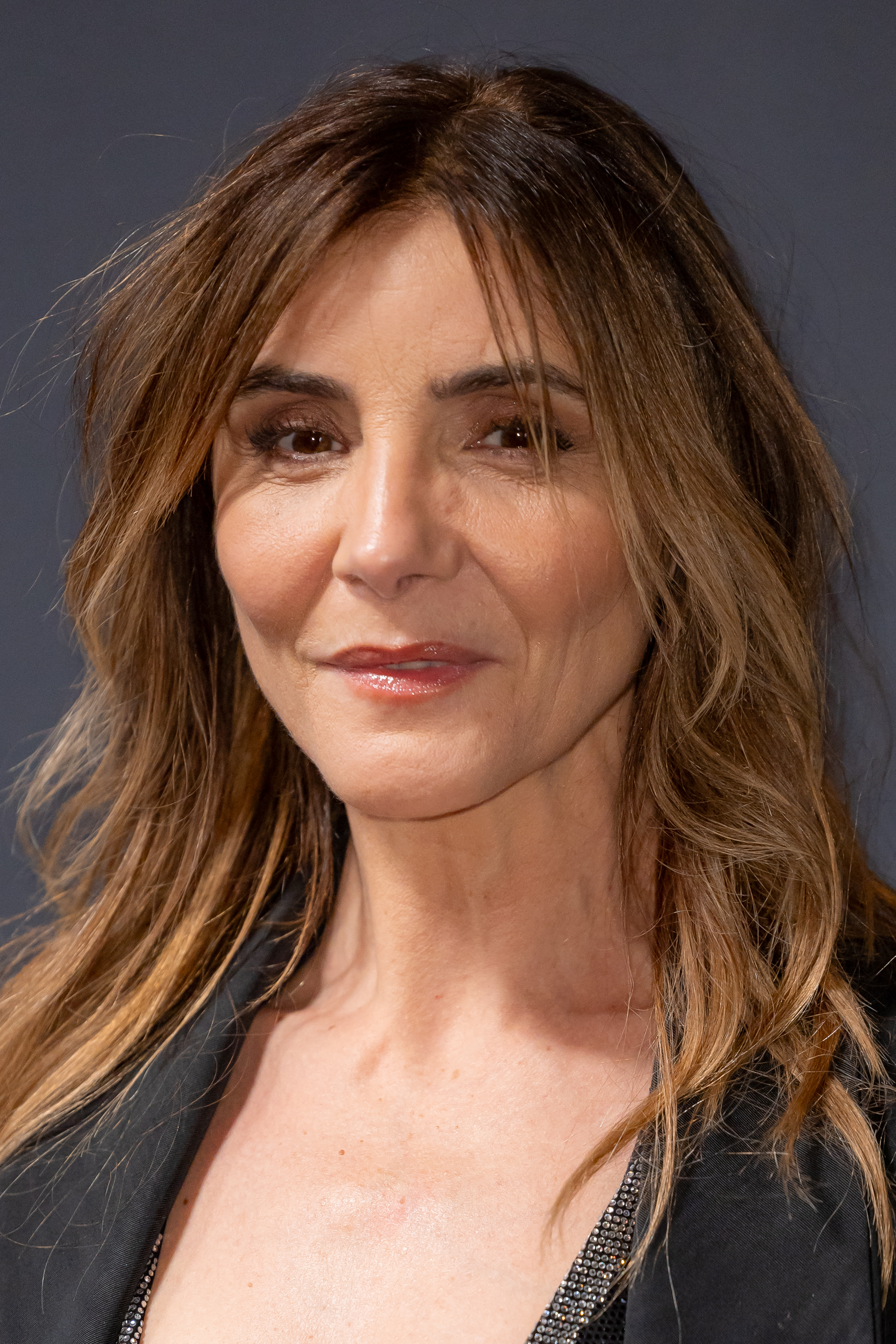
- Courau in 2025
- Born: Clotilde Marie Pascale Courau; 3 April 1969 (age 57); Levallois-Perret, Hauts-de-Seine, France
- Occupation: Actress
- Title: Princess of Venice
- Spouse: Emanuele Filiberto of Savoy, Prince of Venice (m. 2003; sep. 2021)
- Children: Vittoria, Princess of Carignano; Princess Luisa

Clotilde Marie Pascale di Savoia (née Courau; born 3 April 1969) is a French actress. In 2003, she married Emanuele Filiberto di Savoia, a member of the House of Savoy and the grandson of Umberto II, the last king of Italy.

== Early life and family ==
Coat of arms of du Pontavice, Clotilde's maternal family

Clotilde Marie Pascale Courau was born on 3 April 1969 in Levallois-Perret, Hauts-de-Seine, France, the eldest daughter of Jean-Claude Courau (b. 1942), a hydraulic engineer, and his wife, Catherine Marie Antoinette du Pontavice des Renardières (b. 1948), a school teacher, daughter of Haitian-born Marie Lélia Gabriel (Note: Marie Lélia du Pontavice des Renardières, née Gabriel, died in 2023 in Ville-d'Avray, France at the age of 97. She was born in 1926 in Paris to Haitian citizen François Joseph Camille Gabriel, born in 1898 in Port-au-Prince, Haiti, and his French wife Catherine Sarthou, born in 1900 in Higuères-Souye, Béarn. François Joseph Camille Gabriel was a member of the Mulatto Haitian elite, the son of Léon Gabriel and Camille Augustine Nau (divorced from Alexandre Clesca, son of Andrea Antonio Giuseppe [Joseph] Clesca, French Vice Consul in Saint-Marc, Haiti), as well as the half-brother of Haitian General Joseph Clesca, and the great-grandnephew of Haitian poet Ignace Nau and Haitian historian and politician Émile Nau.) and husband Count Pierre François Marie Antoine du Pontavice des Renardières (1926-2021), Officer of the Legion of Honor and former Mayor of Merry-la-Vallée, whose family belonged to the ancient French nobility of Brittany and can be traced back to the 13th century.

She has three sisters named Christine, Camille and Capucine Courau. She lived as a child, with her sisters, between Paris, Egypt and Benin. The Courau sisters were brought up in the Roman Catholic religion.

== Career ==
In 1991, Courau was nominated for a César, for Most Promising Actress (Meilleur espoir féminin), and won a European Film Award for Best Actress, both for the film Le petit criminel (1990). She then appeared in Dusty Hughes' A Slip of the Tongue opposite John Malkovich on the stage, and in Vincent Ward's Map of the Human Heart. In 1995, she won the Prix Suzanne Bianchetti at the SACD Awards. She was nominated again for a César twice in 1996 for Best Supporting Actress (Meilleur second rôle féminin) and Most Promising Actress (Meilleur espoir féminin) both for the film Élisa. In 1998 she was named one of European cinema's "Shooting Stars" by European Film Promotion and in 2000 she won the Prix Romy Schneider. She was created a Dame of the Ordre des Arts et des Lettres of France on 7 February 2007.

== Personal life ==
=== Marriage ===
Clotilde Courau announced her engagement on 10 July 2003 and on 25 September married Emanuele Filiberto, Prince of Venice, at the Church of Santa Maria degli Angeli e dei Martiri in Rome. At the ceremony, she wore a wedding gown designed by Valentino. Six months pregnant at the time, she was seen as a controversial bride because of her left-wing views.

The couple have two daughters:

- Princess Vittoria Chiara Cristina Adelaide Maria (born 28 December 2003 in Geneva, Switzerland),
- Princess Luisa Giovanna Bianca Agata Gavina Maria (born 16 August 2006 in Geneva, Switzerland).

In March 2025, Prince Emanuele Filiberto announced that he and Courau had been living separately since 2021.

=== Political views ===
In December 2023, alongside 50 other filmmakers, Courau signed an open letter published in Libération demanding a ceasefire and an end to the killing of civilians amid the 2023 Israeli invasion of the Gaza Strip, as well as the establishment of a corridor into Gaza for humanitarian aid and the release of hostages.

== Filmography ==
- Civilisations (1988) (TV mini-series) – Elyssa
- The Little Gangster – (1990) – The sister, Nathalie (Stéphanie)
- Polski Crash – (1993) – Alina Suchecka
- Map of the Human Heart – (1993) – Rainee
- The Pickle – (1993) – Françoise
- Ugly Meets the People – (1995) – Girl
- Tom est tout seul – (1995) – Marion
- Élisa – (1995) – Solange
- La fidèle infidèle (1995) (TV) – Cécile
- The Bait – (1995) – Patricia
- Les Grands Ducs – (1996) – Juliette
- Une leçon particulière (1997) (TV) – Julie
- Fred – (1997) – Lisa
- Marthe – (1997) – Marthe
- Bob le magnifique (1998) (TV) – Christine / Christina
- Hors jeu – (1998) – Clotilde Courau
- Le poulpe – (1998) – Cheryl
- Milk (1999) – Ilaria
- Deterrence (1999) – Katie
- En face – (2000) – Michelle
- La parenthèse enchantée – (2000) – Alice
- Deep in the Woods – (2000) – Sophie
- Exit – (2000) – Pearl / The journalist
- Le nouveau Jean-Claude – (2002) – Marianna
- Summer Things – (2002) – Julie
- Almost Peaceful – (2002) – Simone
- The Code – (2002) – Nina
- Mon Idole – (2002) – Fabienne
- Les beaux jours (2003) (TV) – Gaby
- Nuit noire, 17 octobre 1961 (2005) (TV) – Sabine
- La signora delle camelie (2005) (TV) – ....
- Mafalda di Savoia (2006) (TV mini-series) – Giovanna of Italy
- La Vie en Rose (2007) – Annetta Gassion
- Modern Love (2008) – Marie
- Chez Maupassant (1 episode, 2008, TV episode La chambre 11) – Clarisse / Marguerite
- Des mots d'amour aka Words of Love (Canada, English title) (2009) (TV) – Alice Andrézy
- Tous les soleils (2011) – Florence
- Babysitting (2014) – Mme. Schaudel
- In the Shadow of Women (2015) – Manon
- Eva & Leon (2015) – Lucie
- Heaven Will Wait (2016) – Sylvie
- An Easy Girl (2019)
- The Bad Poet (2020)
- Benedetta (2021)
- Marguerite's Theorem (2023) – Suzanne
- Last Summer (2023) – Mina
- The Lake (2025)

== Honours ==
=== National honours ===
- France: Member of the Order of Arts and Letters

=== Dynastic honour ===
- Montenegrin Royal Family: Dame Grand Cross of the Order of Prince Danilo I
- House of Savoy: Dame Grand Cordon of the Royal Order of Saints Maurice and Lazarus
- Sovereign Military Order of Malta: Dame Grand Cross of Honour and Devotion of the Order of Saint John (2023)

=== Honorific eponyms ===
In 2009, her name was given to a rose created by the rose grower Fabien Ducher to mark the 500,000th visitor to the Jardins de l'Imaginaire, Terrasson.

Clotilde Courau House of Savoy Born: 3 April 1969
Titles in pretence
Preceded by Marina Doria	— TITULAR — Queen consort of Italy; 3 February 2024 – present Reason for succession failure: Kingdom abolished in 1946	Incumbent
