= Giovanni Cheli =

His Eminence Giovanni Cheli OCI
- President of the Pontifical Council for the Pastoral Care of Migrants and Itinerants
- See: SS Cosma e Damiano
- Appointed: 18 September 1986 (Pro-Prefect)
- Term ended: 15 June 1998
- Predecessor: Emanuele Clarizio
- Successor: Stephen Fumio Hamao
- Other post: Cardinal-Priest of SS Cosma e Damiano
- Previous posts: Titular Archbishop of Santa Giusta (1978–1998); Permanent Observer of the Holy See to the United Nations (1978–1986); Cardinal-Deacon of Santi Cosma e Damiano (1998–2008)

Orders
- Ordination: 21 June 1942 by Umberto Rossi
- Consecration: 16 September 1978 by Jean-Marie Villot
- Created cardinal: 21 February 1998 by John Paul II
- Rank: Cardinal-Priest

Personal details
- Born: 4 October 1918 Turin, Italy
- Died: 8 February 2013 (aged 94)
- Denomination: Roman Catholic
- Motto: unitas in charitate
- Coat of arms

Styles of Giovanni Cheli
- Reference style: His Eminence
- Spoken style: Your Eminence
- Religious style: Cardinal
- Informal style: Cardinal
- See: Santa Giusta (titular see)

Giovanni Cheli (4 October 1918 – 8 February 2013) was an Italian prelate of the Catholic Church, who had a career in the diplomatic service of the Holy See and then in the senior ranks of the Roman Curia. He was made a cardinal in 1998.

== Early years ==
Cheli was born in Turin, Italy. He was educated at the seminary of Asti and soon developed his skills in canon law. At the Pontifical Lateran University in Rome, he obtained his doctorate in that subject in 1942 and was ordained on 21 April of that year. Cheli returned to the parish of Asti and became diocesan vice-counselor of the Young Men of Catholic Action.

== Diplomat ==
He prepared for a career in the diplomatic corps at the Pontifical Ecclesiastical Academy. He entered the Vatican diplomatic service in 1952. At first, Cheli had the minor role of attaché of the nunciature in Guatemala and then in more important roles in Spain and Italy. He also did pastoral work in Madrid and worked for the Pontifical Council for Public Affairs from 1967 to 1973.

He became Permanent Observer of the Holy See to the United Nations in 1973. By this time, Cheli was known for his knowledge of the problems the Vatican encountered relating to the communist nations of Eastern Europe.

On 8 September 1978, Pope John Paul I named him titular archbishop of Santa Giusta and gave him the rank of nuncio, though his title remained permanent observer. He received his episcopal consecration on 16 September.

== Roman Curia ==
He was named Pro-Prefect of the Pontifical Commission for Migration and Tourism on 18 September 1986, and his title changed to president when it was reorganized as the Pontifical Council for the Pastoral Care of Migrants and Itinerant People in 1988.

John Paul II made Cheli Cardinal-Deacon of Santi Cosma e Damiano in the consistory of 21 February 1998. On 1 March 2008, he was elevated to Cardinal-Priest.

On 15 June 1998, he retired from his role at the Pontifical Council upon the appointment of his successor, Stephen Fumio Hamao.

He continued to be outspoken in retirement. He criticized the rule excluding cardinals over the age of 80 from participating in a papal conclave. He told a journalist in December 2003: "It is a great deprivation for cardinals. Perhaps different limits can be used in future. Perhaps those whose minds have gone should not vote. We all know who they are. And some of them are in their seventies." Behind the scenes he participated in a campaign in opposition to Pope Benedict XVI's appointments of Tarcisio Bertone as Secretary of State, believing Bertone lacked the requisite diplomatic experience.

He was decorated with the Order of Isabel the Catholic and named commendatore of the Order of Merit of the Italian Republic, and of the Verdienstkreuz of the Federal Republic of Germany.

Cheli died on 8 February 2013 of natural causes, at the age of 94. His funeral was held on 9 February at St. Peter's Basilica in Vatican City with Cardinal Angelo Sodano celebrating the Mass.

Preceded by Alberto Giovannetti	Permanent Observer of the Holy See to the United Nations; 25 July 1973 – 18 September 1986	Succeeded by Renato Raffaele Martino
