= Marina Doria =

Swiss water-skier

Princess Marina
- Princess of Naples
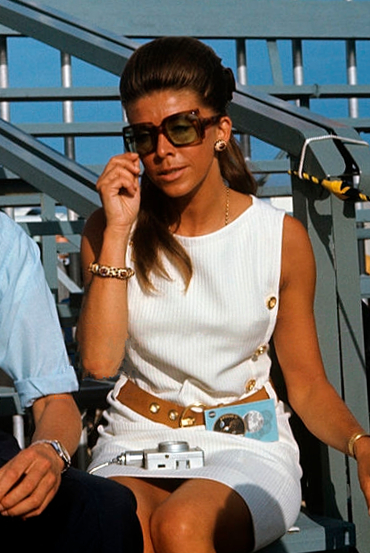
- Pictured in 1969 at Cape Canaveral
- Born: 12 February 1935 (age 91); Geneva, Switzerland
- Spouse: Vittorio Emanuele, Prince of Naples (m. 1971; died 2024)
- Issue: Emanuele Filiberto, Prince of Venice
Names
- Marina Ricolfi-Doria
- House: Savoy (by marriage)
- Father: René Ricolfi-Doria
- Mother: Iris Amalia Benvenuti
- Occupation: water skier

Princess Marina of Savoy (née Marina Ricolfi-Doria, born 12 February 1935) is a Swiss former water skier. She competed three times at the Water Ski World Championships winning gold medals in 1955 and in 1957. She won the overall title in the European Water Ski Championships consecutively from 1953 to 1956 and won five Swiss national titles. She was inducted into the International Water Ski Federation Hall of Fame in 1991.

She is the widow of Vittorio Emanuele, Prince of Naples, the son of the last king and queen of Italy, Umberto II and Marie José. They had one son, Emanuele Filiberto of Savoy, Prince of Venice.

== Early life and ancestry ==
Ricolfi-Doria was born in Geneva on 12 February 1935, as the daughter of René Ricolfi-Doria, a Swiss Olympic athlete and his wife, Iris Amalia Benvenuti. Through her father, she has a remote descent from the House of Doria, an old and extremely wealthy Italian noble family, who played a major role in the history of the Republic of Genoa and the Kingdom of Sardinia, from the 12th century to the 16th century.

== Career ==
In 1955 she became a water-skiing performer at Cypress Gardens, in Florida in the United States. She competed three times in the Water Ski World Championships; in 1953, in 1955 and in 1957. In 1955 she took the Tricks gold medal, and in 1957 she took gold in both Slalom and Tricks, thus becoming the overall women's world champion. She won the overall title in the European Championships every year from 1953 to 1956, and took five or more overall Swiss national titles. In 1991 Ricolfi-Doria was included in the Hall of Fame of the International Water Ski Federation, as the "finest female skier from Europe of the first decade of international competition". She continued to compete until 1960.

== Marriage ==
Ricolfi-Doria met Vittorio Emanuele, Prince of Naples in 1960 at the Société Nautique de Genève, where both were water-skiing. They were married in a Catholic church in Tehran, Iran, in the autumn of 1971; their wedding had been announced during the 2,500-year celebration of the Persian Empire in Persepolis. They had one son, Emanuele Filiberto of Savoy, Prince of Venice.

As the spouse of the head of the House of Savoy, she was entitled to the Privilège du blanc, the ability to wear white garments when in an audience with the pope. She exercised this privilege on 18 May 2003 during a Catholic mass marking the birth anniversary of Pope John Paul II.

== Gallery ==
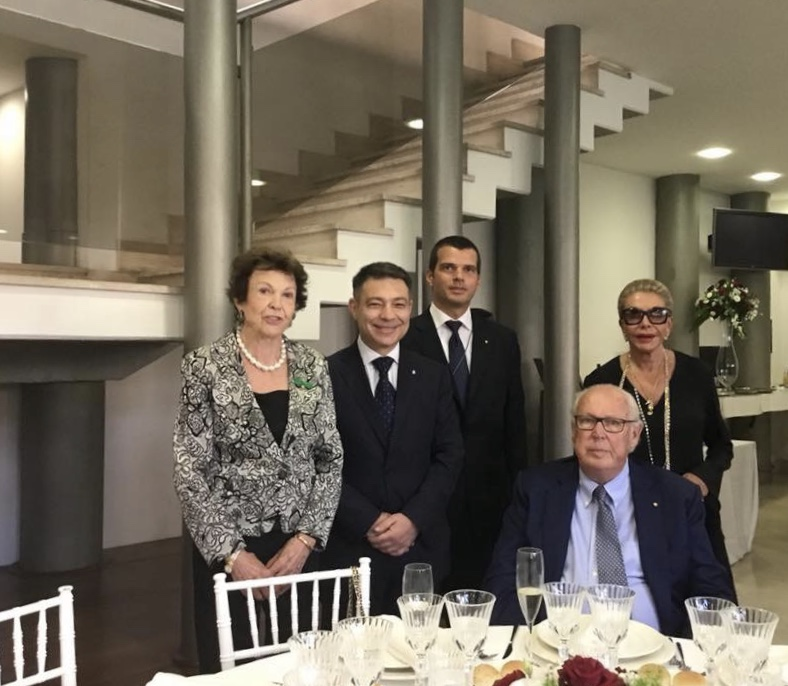
The Savoy family with Princess Maria Pia of Bourbon-Parma

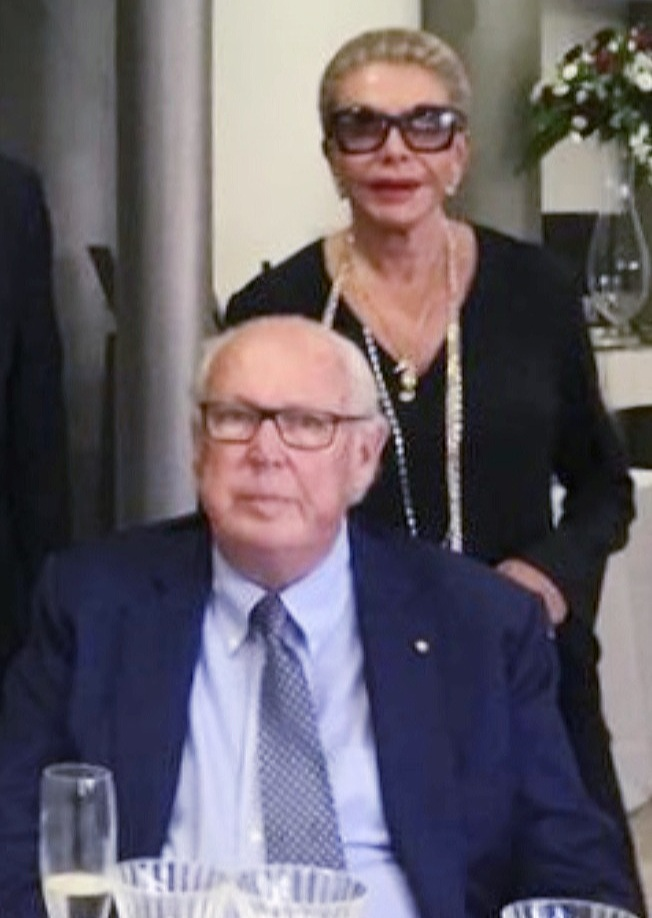
Marina with her husband, Prince Vittorio Emanuele of Savoy

Coat of arms of Marina as Duchess of Savoy

== Honour ==
- Holy See: Knight Grand Cross of the Order of Pius IX

Marina Doria House of Savoy Born: 12 February 1935
Titles in pretence
Preceded by Princess Marie José of Belgium	— TITULAR — Queen consort of Italy; 18 March 1983 – 3 February 2024; Reason for succession failure: Kingdom abolished in 1946	Succeeded by Clotilde Courau
