= Wedding of Baudouin of Belgium and Fabiola de Mora y Aragón =

1960 Royal Wedding

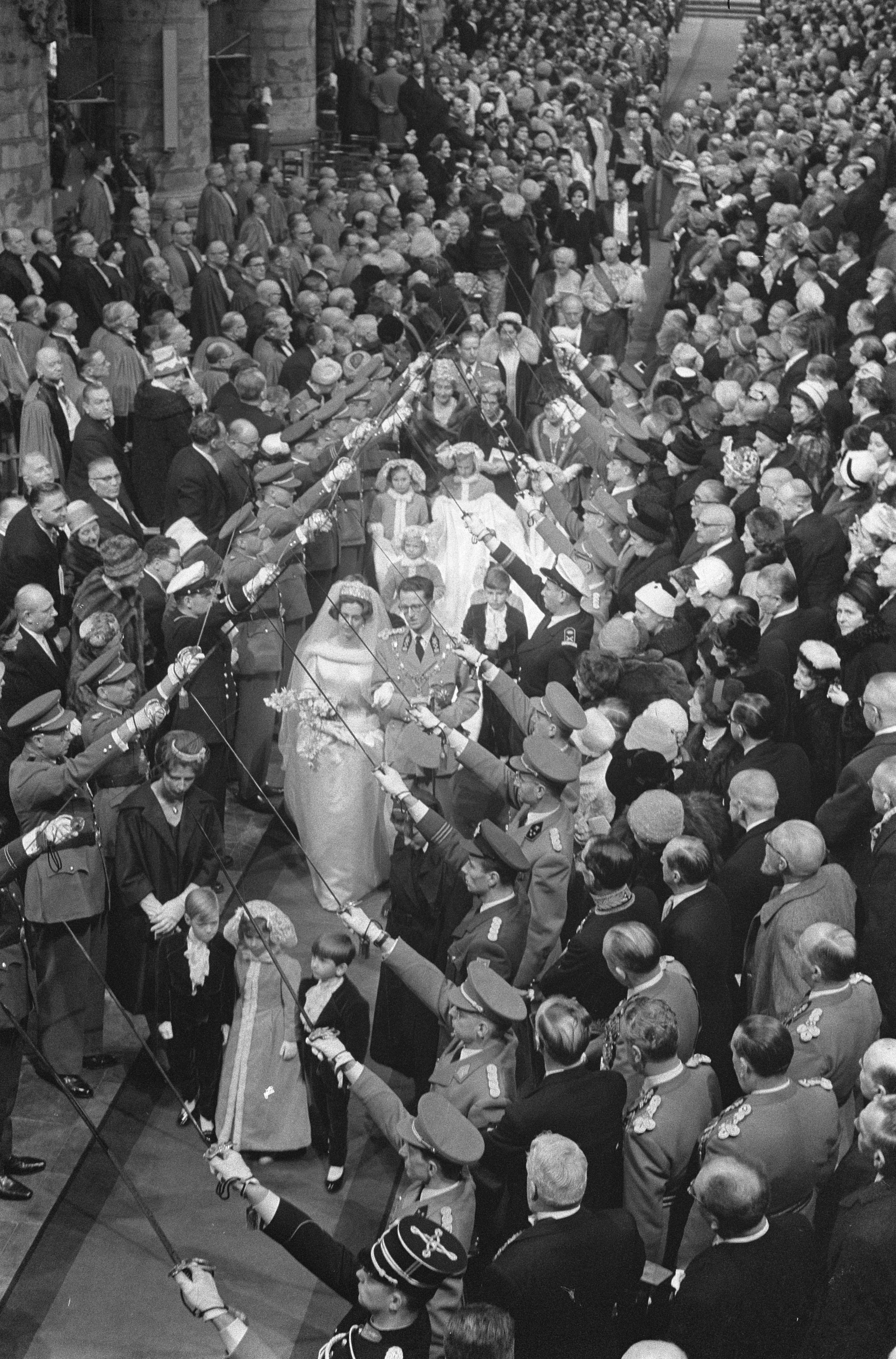
- Date: 15 December 1960; 65 years ago
- Venue: Royal Palace of Brussels; Cathedral of St. Michael and St. Gudula
- Location: Brussels, Belgium
- Participants: King Baudouin of Belgium; Doña Fabiola de Mora y Aragón

The wedding of King Baudouin of Belgium, and Doña Fabiola de Mora y Aragón took place on Thursday, 15 December 1960. The couple was married first in a civil ceremony held in the Throne Room of the Royal Palace of Brussels and then in a Roman Catholic ceremony at the Cathedral of St. Michael and St. Gudula.

== Engagement ==
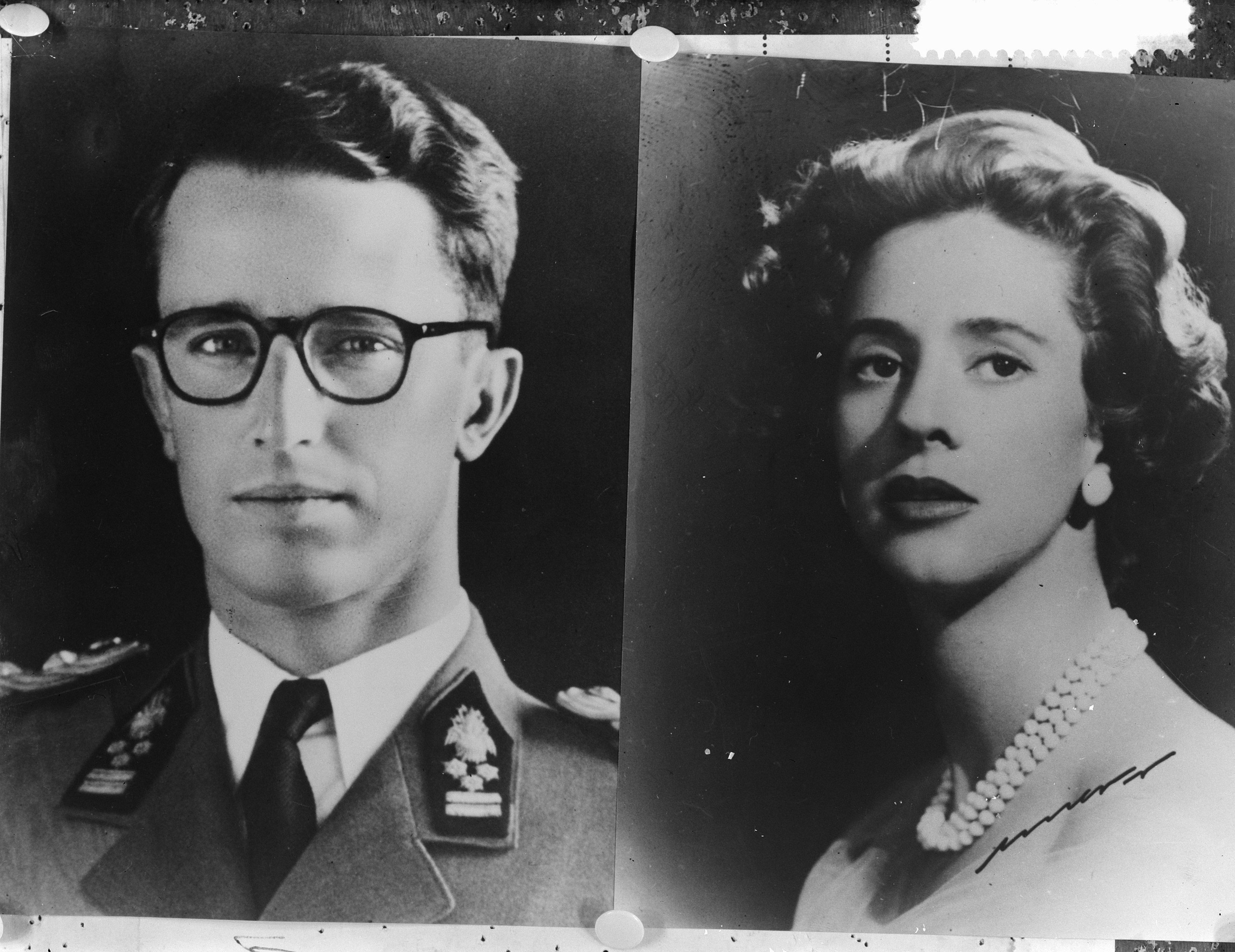
King Baudouin and Doña Fabiola at the time of their engagement

The marriage of King Baudouin, who acceded to the throne in 1950, was of great interest to the Belgian people. Leo Joseph Suenens, Auxiliary Bishop of Mechelen, took matters into his own hands and sent Irish nun, Sister Veronica O’Brien, to find him a devout Catholic, Spanish, aristocratic wife. Sister O'Brien believed she found the perfect candidate in Fabiola de Mora y Aragón, who was then working as a hospital nurse.

The engagement was announced on 16 September 1960 by Gaston Eyskens, Prime Minister of Belgium. Afterwards, the couple met the press in the gardens of the Castle of Laeken. The news came as a pleasant surprise to the Belgian people, who were not aware the King and Doña Fabiola were courting.

=== Pre-wedding celebrations ===
Prior to departing Spain, Doña María del Carmen Polo y Martínez-Valdés, wife of Generalissímo Francisco Franco, presented Doña Fabiola with a strawberry leaf tiara, resembling a Ducal coronet, with interchangeable rubies, aquamarines and emeralds, on behalf of the Spanish government. The wedding attracted media attention, both in Belgium and Spain and abroad. In its 6 September 1960, issue, TIME magazine called Doña Fabiola the "Cinderella Girl" and described her as "an attractive young woman, though no raving beauty" and "the girl who could not catch a man." Spanish bakers set out to honour the impending marriage by creating a type of bread called "la fabiola", which is still made in Palencia.

Two pre-wedding balls were held, the first on 13 December at the Cinquantenaire Museum and the second on 14 December at the Royal Palace of Brussels.

== Wedding ==
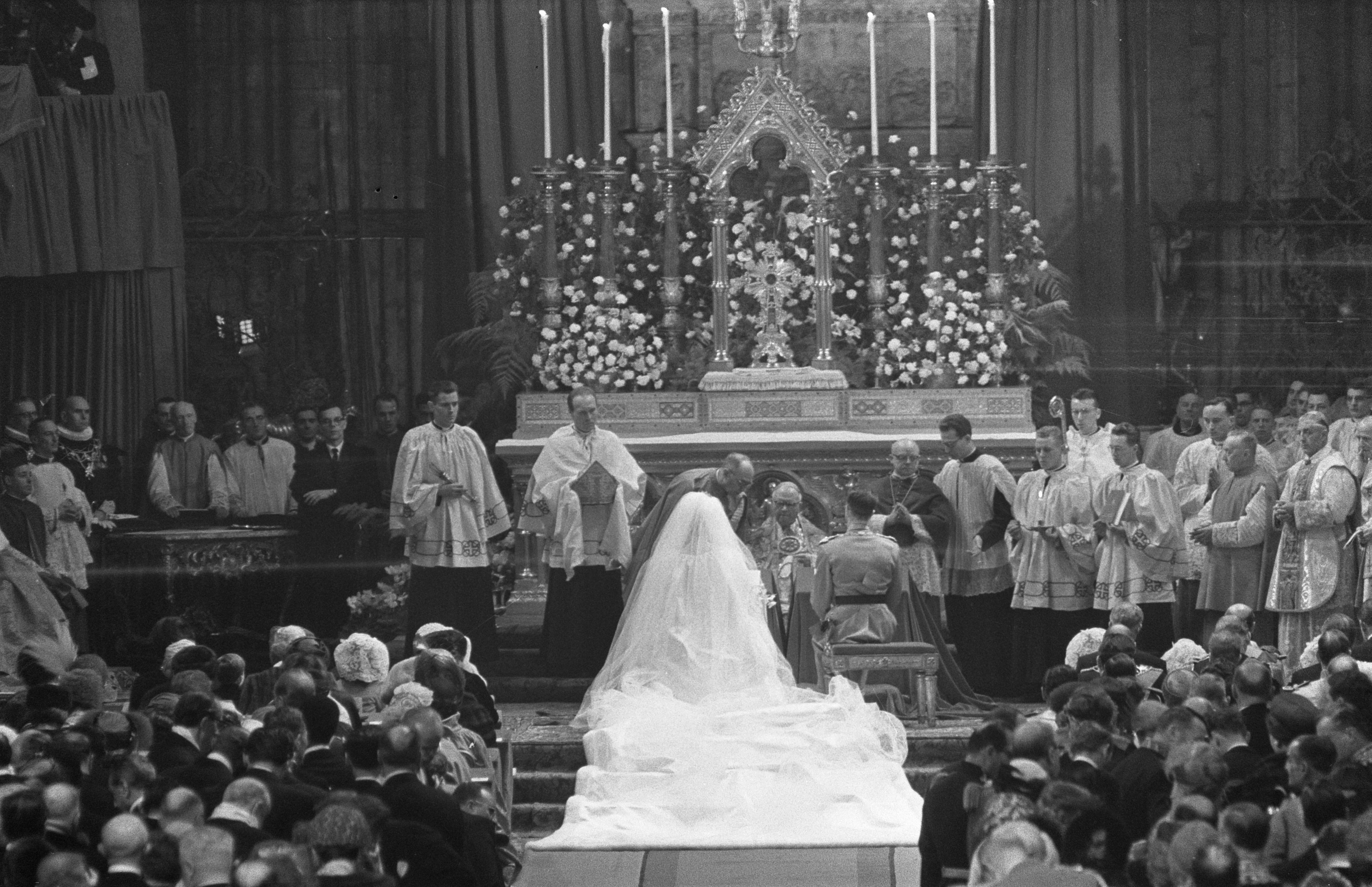
Cardinal van Roey conducts the nuptial mass

=== Civil ceremony ===
Prior to the religious service, the couple were married civilly in the Throne Room of the Royal Palace of Brussels. The service was presided over by Albert Lilar, Minister of Justice, Lucien Cooremans, Mayor of Brussels, and a member of the Municipal Council. The witnesses were the groom's father, King Leopold III, his brother-in-law, Jean, Hereditary Grand Duke of Luxembourg, the bride's brother, The Marqués of Casa Riera, and the pretender to the Spanish throne, the Count of Barcelona.

=== Religious ceremony ===
The religious service was conducted by Jozef-Ernest Cardinal van Roey at the Cathedral of St. Michael and St. Gudula. Giuseppe Cardinal Siri read a personal message from Pope John XXIII.

As the King and new Queen left the cathedral Handel's Hallelujah chorus from Messiah was played.

=== Attire ===
The bride's white silk and tulle gown, trimmed with ermine, had a high neckline, three-quarter length sleeves with a drop waist and a full skirt. It was designed by Cristóbal Balenciaga and had a 6 metres (20 ft) long train. She wore the Art Deco diamond tiara given to her late mother-in-law at the time of her own marriage in 1926.

The groom wore the uniform of a Lieutenant-General of the Armed Forces with the riband and star of the Belgian Order of Leopold and the collar of the Spanish Order of Isabella the Catholic.

=== Broadcast ===
Radio-Télévision Belge (RTB) and Belgische Radio- en Televisieomroep (BRT) jointly produced the live television signal of the wedding that they broadcast in Belgium (Note: Commented by Fernand Colleye in RTB.) and that was relayed to the broadcasters in the continent through the Eurovision network. In Spain, Televisión Española (TVE) broadcast it live, (Note: Commented by Federico Gallo and Eduardo Sancho in TVE.) being their first live broadcast of an event in full received from abroad.

== Guests ==
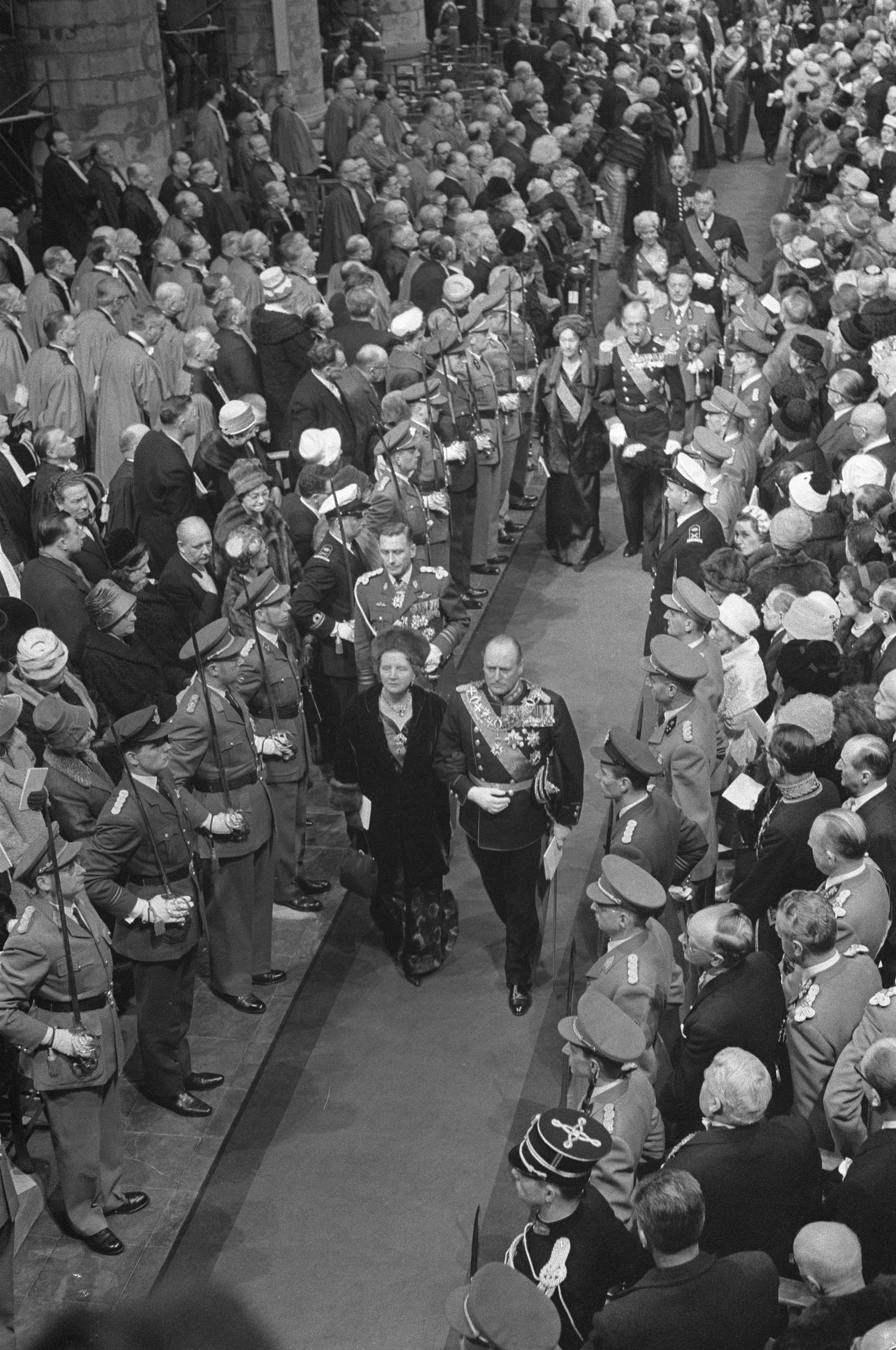
Queen Juliana of the Netherlands and King Olav V of Norway leave the cathedral following the wedding.

As a descendant of Christian IX of Denmark, Louis Philippe I of France, Miguel I of Portugal and Francis, Duke of Saxe-Coburg-Saalfeld, Baudouin was closely related to most of the royals in Europe, many of whom were present at his marriage.

=== The groom's family ===
- King Leopold III of Belgium and the Princess of Réthy, the groom's father and stepmother
  - The Hereditary Grand Duchess and Hereditary Grand Duke of Luxembourg, the groom's sister and brother-in-law
  - The Prince and Princess of Liège, the groom's brother and sister-in-law
  - Prince Alexandre of Belgium, the groom's half-brother
- Queen Elisabeth of Belgium, the groom's paternal grandmother
  - Queen Marie-José and King Umberto II of Italy, the groom's paternal aunt and uncle
    - Princess and Prince Alexander of Yugoslavia, the groom's first cousin and her husband, the groom's third cousin
    - The Prince of Naples, the groom's first cousin
    - Princess Maria Gabriella of Savoy, the groom's first cousin
    - Princess Maria Beatrice of Savoy, the groom's first cousin

=== The bride's family ===
- The Dowager Marchioness of Casa Riera, the bride's mother
  - The Countess and Count of Sástago, the bride's sister and brother-in-law
  - The Marquess and Marchioness of Casa Riera, the bride's brother and sister-in-law
  - The Duchess and Duke of Lécera, the bride's sister and brother-in-law
  - Don Jaime de Mora y Aragón, the bride's brother
  - The Marchioness and Marquess of Aguilar, the bride's sister and brother-in-law
  - The Count de la Rosa de Abarca, the bride's brother

=== Foreign royal guests ===
==== Members of reigning royal houses ====
- The King of Norway, the groom's maternal uncle by marriage
  - Princess Astrid of Norway, the groom's first cousin
- Princess and Prince Axel of Denmark, the groom's maternal aunt and uncle (representing the King of Denmark)
  - Prince and Princess Georg of Denmark, the groom's first cousin and his wife
  - (Denmark) Count and Countess Flemming of Rosenborg, the groom's first cousin and his wife
- The Duke of Halland, the groom's second cousin (representing the King of Sweden)
- The Queen and Prince Consort of the Netherlands, the groom's third cousin twice removed, and her husband
  - Princess Beatrix of the Netherlands, the groom's fourth cousin once removed
  - Princess Irene of the Netherlands, the groom's fourth cousin once removed
- The Grand Duchess and Prince Consort of Luxembourg, the groom's first cousins twice removed (also parents of the groom's brother-in-law)
- The Princess Margaret and Mr Antony Armstrong-Jones, the groom's third cousin and her husband (representing the Queen of the United Kingdom)
- (Pahlavi Iran) Prince Gholamreza of Iran (representing the Shah of Iran)
- (Ethiopian Empire) Prince Iskander Desta of Ethiopia (representing the Emperor of Ethiopia)

==== Members of non-reigning royal houses ====
- The Count and Countess of Barcelona, the groom's fourth cousin and his wife, the groom's third cousin once removed
  - Infante Juan Carlos of Spain, the groom's fourth cousin
- Infanta María Cristina, Countess Marone, and the Count Marone, the groom's fourth cousin and her husband
- Infante Jaime, and Emmanuelle de Dampierre, Duke and Duchess of Anjou and Segovia, the groom's fourth cousin and his wife
- Prince Alfonso of Bourbon, the groom's fourth cousin
- King Michael I and Queen Anne of Romania, the groom's third cousin and his wife, the groom's second cousin once removed
- Tsar Simeon II of Bulgaria, the groom's fourth cousin
- Crown Prince Otto of Austria, the groom's second cousin once removed
- The Archduke and Archduchess of Austria-Este, the groom's second cousin once removed, and his wife
- The Duke and Duchess of Braganza, the groom's first cousin twice removed, and his wife, the groom's third cousin once removed
- The Princess Napoléon, wife of the groom's second cousin once removed

=== Other notable guests ===
- Don Cristóbal Martínez-Bordiú y Ortega and Doña María del Carmen Franco y Polo

== Aftermath ==
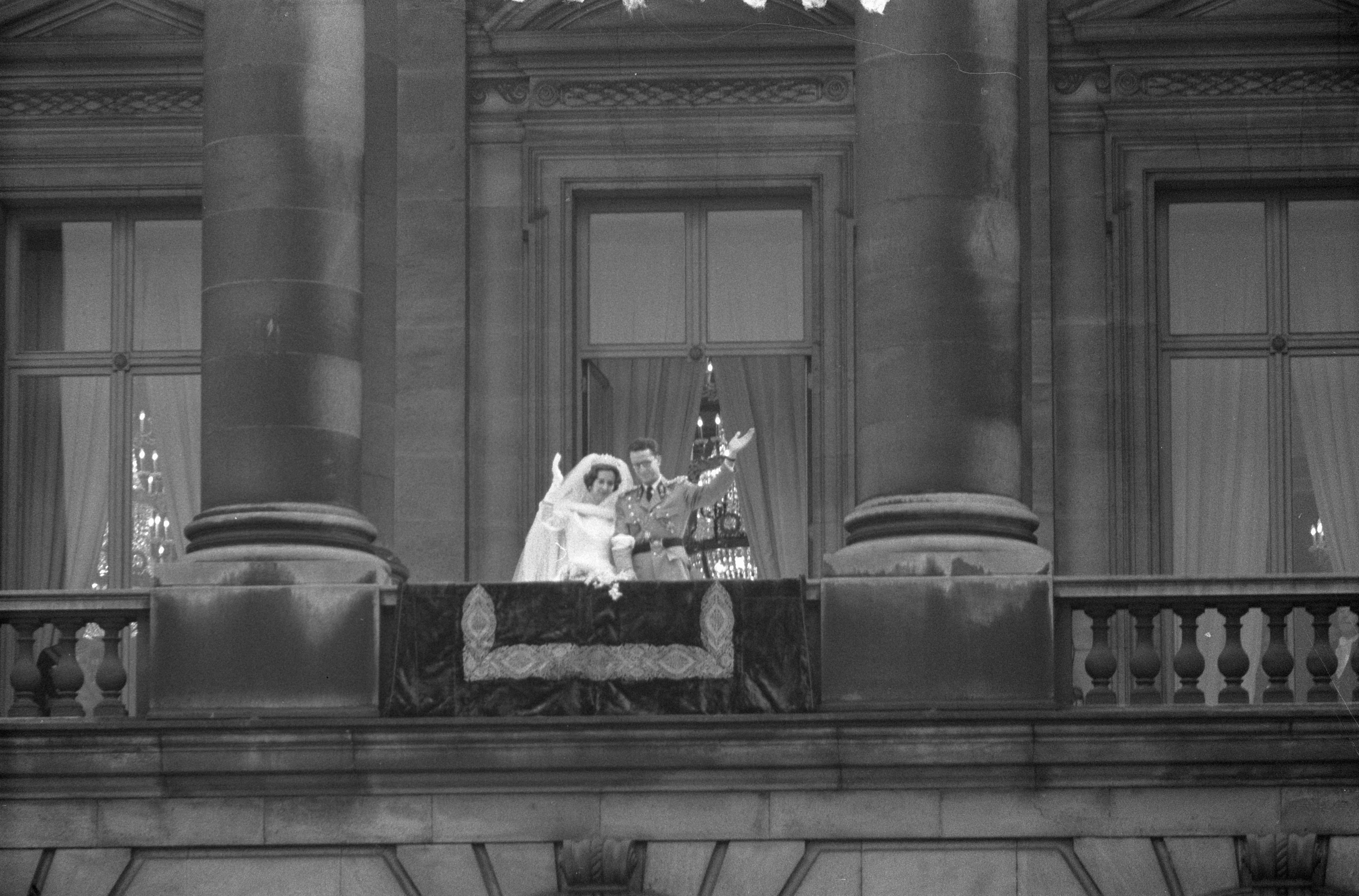
The King and Queen on the balcony of the Royal Palace following their wedding.

King Baudouin and Queen Fabiola were married for 33 years.

The couple had no children. Fabiola's five pregnancies ended in miscarriage in 1961, 1962, 1963, 1966 and 1968.

King Baudouin died on 31 July 1993 at the Villa Astrida, Motril in Spain. Queen Fabiola died on 5 December 2014 at Stuyvenberg Castle, Laeken.
