= Marie-José of Belgium =

Queen of Italy in 1946

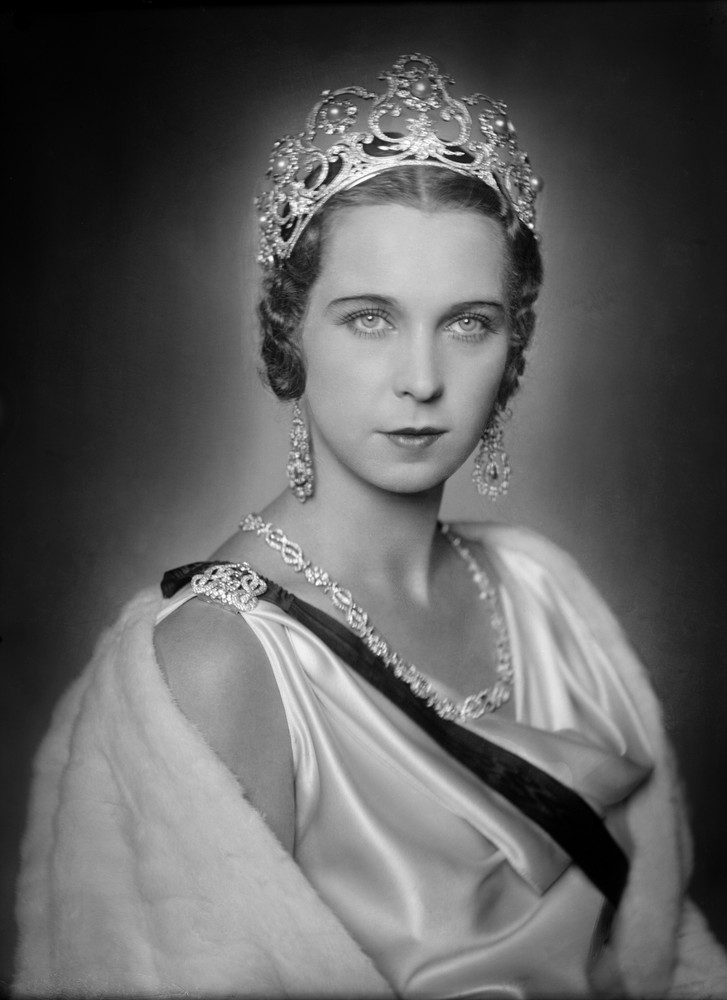
- Official portrait, 1946

Queen consort of Italy
- Tenure: 9 May 1946 – 12 June 1946
- Born: 4 August 1906; Ostend, Belgium
- Died: 27 January 2001 (aged 94); Thônex, Switzerland
- Burial: Hautecombe Abbey, France
- Spouse: Umberto II of Italy (m. 1930; died 1983)
- Issue: Princess Maria Pia; Vittorio Emanuele, Prince of Naples; Princess Maria Gabriella; Princess Maria Beatrice
Names
- Marie-José Charlotte Sophie Amélie Henriette Gabrielle
- House: Saxe-Coburg and Gotha (until 1920); Belgium (from 1920)
- Father: Albert I of Belgium
- Mother: Elisabeth of Bavaria

Marie-José of Belgium (Note: Flemish: [maːˌri joːˈseː], French: [maʁi ʒoze]; Italian: Maria José [maˈriːa ʒoˈzɛ ddel ˈbɛldʒo].) (Marie-José Charlotte Sophie Amélie Henriette Gabrielle; 4 August 1906 – 27 January 2001) was the last Queen of Italy as the wife of Umberto II. Her 34-day tenure as queen consort earned her the nickname "the May Queen" (Italian: la regina di maggio).

== Early life ==
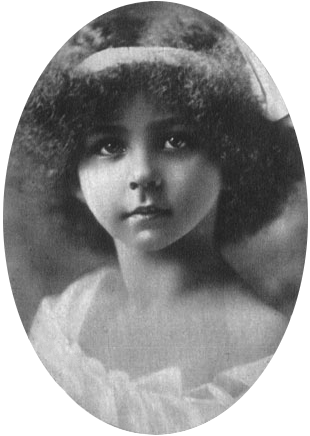
Marie-José, aged 9

Princess Marie-José was born in Ostend, the youngest child of King Albert I of the Belgians and his consort, Duchess Elisabeth in Bavaria. Through her mother, she was a grandniece of Empress Elisabeth of Austria and of Maria Sophie of Bavaria, last queen consort of the Kingdom of the Two Sicilies. During the First World War, she was evacuated to England where she was a boarding pupil at the Brentwood Ursuline Convent High School in Brentwood, Essex. She later attended the Santissima Annunziata Boarding School in Florence, Italy, where she first met her future husband. In 1924, Marie-José attended her first court ball. For the occasion, she was given an antique pearl and diamond tiara that had originally been owned by Stéphanie de Beauharnais.

During the First World War, the Princess resided mainly in Great Britain but was often escorted by the Belgian King's Messenger, Archibald Alexander Gordon to her parents in Belgium. In 1918, the Princess reprimanded Major Gordon when he called her rabbit Marshal Soult by the name Soult. The princess explained that if she called for "Gordon", no one would be able to understand who she meant. Still, if she addressed him as Major Gordon, everyone would understand her because everyone knew who Major Gordon was.

== Marriage and children ==
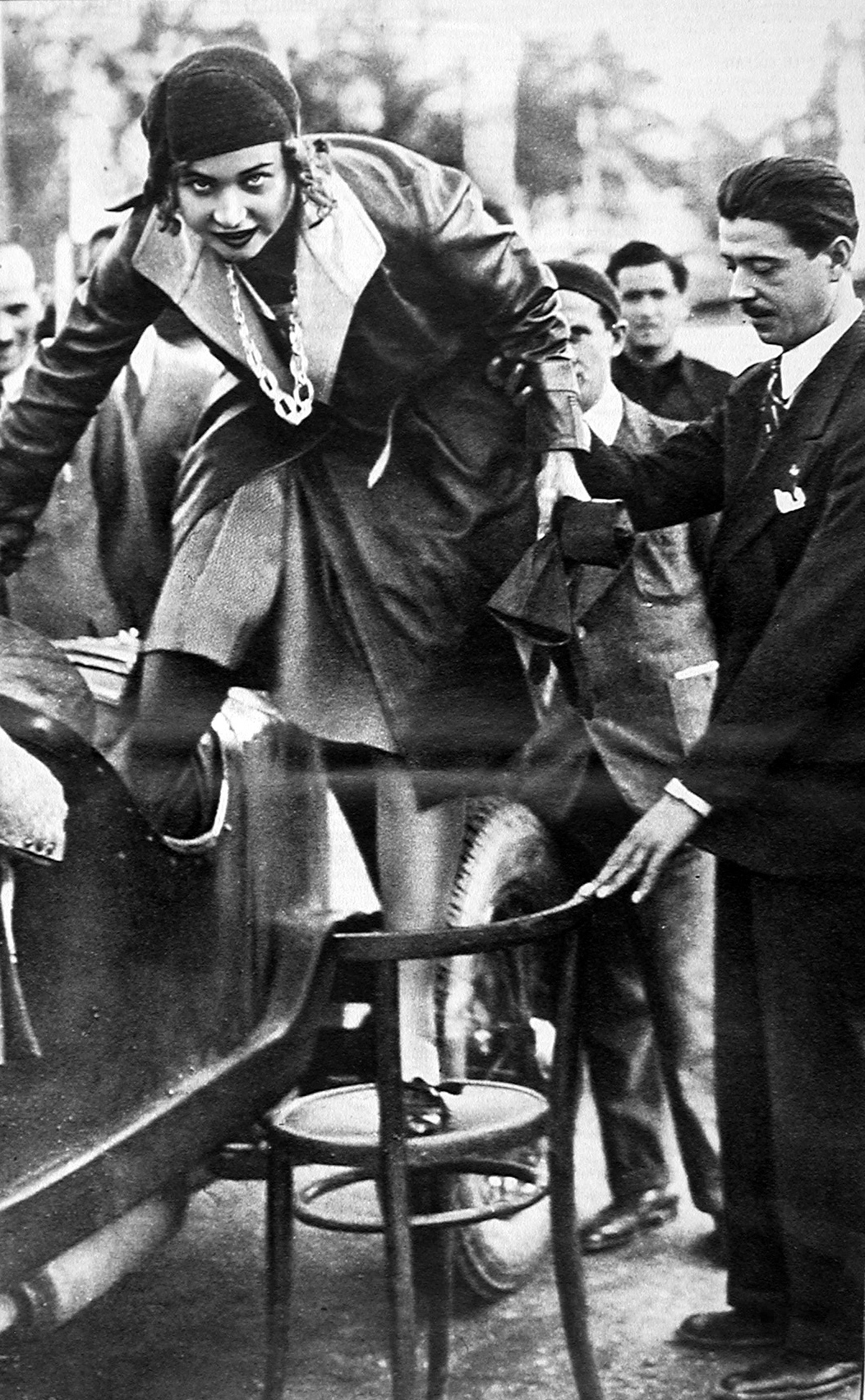
Monza, September 1930. Princess Maria-José of Belgium steps down from Borzacchini's Alfa Romeo car with the help of Prospero Gianferrari.

On 8 January 1930, she married Crown Prince Umberto of Italy, from the House of Savoy, at the Quirinal Palace in Rome, and so became Princess of Piedmont (Italian: Principessa di Piemonte).

Among the wedding gifts was a turquoise and diamond parure, worn by the bride at her pre-wedding reception, and a diamond bow worn as a sash decoration at state occasions, as well as the Musy tiara, an exceptional tiara which belonged to queen Margherita of Savoy, her husband's grandmother.

The couple had four children:

- Princess Maria Pia of Savoy (24 September 1934), who married Prince Alexander of Yugoslavia on 12 February 1955 and was divorced in 1967. Four children were born during the marriage. She remarried to Prince Michel of Bourbon-Parma in 2003.
- Vittorio Emanuele, Prince of Naples (12 February 1937 — 3 February 2024), who married Marina Ricolfi Doria on 7 October 1971. They had one son.
- Princess Maria Gabriella of Savoy (24 February 1940), who married Robert Zellinger de Balkany on 21 June 1969 and was divorced in November 1990. They have issue.
- Princess Maria Beatrice of Savoy (2 February 1943), who married Luis Reyna-Corvallán y Dillon on 1 April 1970 and was divorced in 1998. They had issue.

== Princess of Piedmont ==
In October 1939, Princess Marie-José was made President of the Red Cross in Italy. The Princess and Duchess of Aosta attended the ceremony where Marie-José was installed as President of the Italian Red Cross.

During the Second World War she was one of the very few diplomatic channels between the German/Italian camp and the other European countries involved in the war, as she was the sister of Leopold III of Belgium (kept hostage by the German forces) and at the same time, as the wife of the heir to the throne, close to some of the ministers of Benito Mussolini's cabinet. A British diplomat in Rome recorded that the Princess of Piedmont was the only member of the Italian Royal Family with good political judgment.

Mussolini's mistress, Claretta Petacci, claimed in her diary that in 1937 the then princess and wife of the heir to the throne tried and failed to seduce the dictator at a beach resort near Rome. However, Mussolini's son, Romano, claims that the princess and the dictator entered into a sexual relationship.

In 1943, the Crown Princess involved herself in vain attempts to arrange a separate peace treaty between Italy and the United States; her interlocutor from the Vatican was Monsignor Giovanni Battista Montini, a senior diplomat who later became Pope Paul VI. She also interceded with Adolf Hitler to ask for mercy towards the people of Belgium.

Her attempts were not sponsored by the king and Umberto was not (directly, at least) involved in them. After her failure (she never met the American agents), she was sent with her children to Sarre, in the Aosta Valley, and isolated from the political life of the Royal House.

She sympathised with the partisans, and while she was a refugee in Switzerland, smuggled weapons, money and food for them. She was nominated for appointment as chief of a partisan brigade, but declined.

== Queen for a month ==
Styles of Queen Marie-José
- Reference style: Her Majesty
- Spoken style: Your Majesty

Following Italy's defection to the Allied side in the war, her discredited father-in-law, King Victor Emmanuel III, withdrew from government. Her husband became regent under the title of Lieutenant General of the Realm. He and Marie-José toured war torn Italy, where they made a positive impression. However, King Victor Emmanuel III refused to abdicate until only weeks before the referendum.

Upon the eventual abdication on 9 May 1946 of her father-in-law, Marie-José became Queen consort of Italy, and remained such until the monarchy was abolished by referendum on 2 June 1946, effective 12 June 1946.

Umberto and Marie-José had been widely praised for their performance over the last two years, and it has been argued that had Victor Emmanuel abdicated sooner their relative popularity might have saved the monarchy. Following the monarchy's defeat (54–46%), she and her husband left the country for exile on 13 June 1946.

== Exile ==
In exile, the family gathered for a brief time on the Portuguese Riviera, but she and Umberto separated. She and their four children soon left for Switzerland, where she lived most of the time for the rest of her life, while Umberto remained in Portugal. However, the couple, both of whom were devout Catholics, never divorced. The republican constitution forbade the restoration of the monarchy and also barred all male members of the House of Savoy, as well as former queens consort, from returning to Italian soil.

== Death ==
For some time, she lived in Mexico with her youngest daughter, Princess Maria Beatrice of Savoy, and her grandchildren.

Queen Marie-José returned to Italy after her husband's death in 1983. She died of lung cancer on 27 January 2001, at the age of 94, in a clinic in Thônex near Geneva. She survived her two brothers and some of her nieces and nephews, including King Baudouin of the Belgians.

The funeral was held at Hautecombe Abbey, in Savoy in the south of France, and was attended by 2,000 mourners. Among them were King Albert II of the Belgians, King Juan Carlos I of Spain and Farah Pahlavi, the last Empress of Iran. She was buried in Hautecombe Abbey alongside her husband.

== Musical foundation ==
Like her mother, Queen Elisabeth of Belgium, Marie-José inspired a musical contest. In 1959 she established the Fondation du prix de composition Reine Marie-José. It awarded its biennial prizes for the first time the following year. The first prize at the 1960 Concours was awarded to Giorgio Ferrari for his Quatuor à cordes avec une voix chantée. Subsequent prize winners have included William Albright (1968), Georg Katzer (1978), and Javier Torres Maldonado (2000). The 2017 prize was awarded to Jaehyuck Choi.

== Honours ==
=== National dynastic honours ===
- (Kingdom of Italy) House of Savoy: Knight Grand Cordon of the Order of Saints Maurice and Lazarus

=== Foreign honours ===
- Holy See: Knight of the Order of the Golden Spur
- Sovereign Military Order of Malta: Knight Grand Cross of Justice of the Sovereign Military Order of Malta, Special Class
- (Austria-Hungary) Austrian Imperial and Royal Family: Dame of the Imperial and Royal Order of the Starry Cross, 1st Class
- (Kingdom of Greece) Greek Royal Family: Dame Grand Cross of the Royal Order of Saints Olga and Sophia, 1st Class

=== Arms and monogram ===
Alliance Coat of Arms of King Umberto II and Queen Maria-José

Royal Monogram of Queen Maria-José of Italy

== Portrayal in the arts ==
=== Music ===
- Dutch singer Petra Berger's song "Terra Promessa", the first song from her album Eternal Woman, is about Marie-José.

== See also ==
- Academia Belgica

== Notes ==
Marie-José of Belgium House of Saxe-Coburg and Gotha Cadet branch of the House of Wettin Born: 4 August 1906 Died: 27 January 2001
Italian royalty
Preceded by Princess Elena of Montenegro	Queen consort of Italy; 9 May – 12 June 1946	Monarchy abolished
