= Jae-hyuk =

- Hangul: 재혁
- RR: Jaehyeok
- MR: Chaehyŏk
- IPA: [t͡ɕeʝʌk̚]

Jae-hyuk is a Korean given name.

People with this name include:

- Park Jae-hyuk (born 1963), South Korean alpine skier
- Lee Jae-hyuk (born 1969), South Korean retired amateur boxer
- James Kyson (born Lee Jae-hyuk, 1975), South Korean-born American actor
- Sa Jae-hyouk (born 1985), South Korean weightlifter
- Jaehyuck Choi (born 1994), South Korean-born American composer
- Im Jae-hyuk (born 1994), South Korean actor
- Lim Jae-hyeok (born 1999), South Korean football player

Fictional characters with this name include:

- Kang Jae-hyuk, in 2007 South Korean film The Perfect Couple
- Yu Jae-hyuk, in 2009 South Korean film Five Senses of Eros
- Jae-hyuk, in 2012 South Korean film Deranged
- Choi Jae-hyuk, in 2012 South Korean television series Tasty Life
- Jung Jae-hyuk, in 2012 South Korean television series Fashion King
- Lee Jae-hyeok, in 2012 South Korean film Wonderful Radio
- Seo Jae-hyuk, in 2014 South Korean drama Remember

== See also ==
- List of Korean given names
