= Umberto II of Italy =

King of Italy in 1946

Umberto II
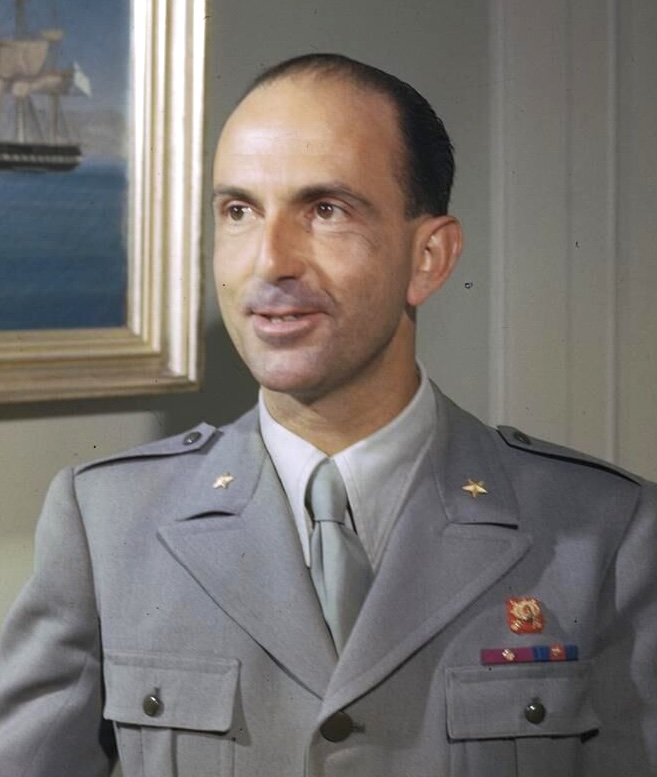
- Umberto, then the Prince of Piedmont, in 1944

King of Italy
- Reign: 9 May 1946 – 12 June 1946
- Predecessor: Victor Emmanuel III
- Successor: Monarchy abolished; Enrico De Nicola as President of Italy
- Prime Minister: Alcide De Gasperi

Head of the House of Savoy
- Tenure: 9 May 1946 – 18 March 1983
- Successor: Prince Vittorio Emanuele; or; Prince Amedeo
- Born: 15 September 1904; Racconigi, Piedmont, Kingdom of Italy
- Died: 18 March 1983 (aged 78); Geneva, Switzerland
- Burial: Hautecombe Abbey, France
- Spouse: Marie-José of Belgium (m. 1930)
- Issue: Princess Maria Pia; Vittorio Emanuele, Prince of Naples; Princess Maria Gabriella; Princess Maria Beatrice
Names
- Italian: Umberto Nicola Tommaso Giovanni Maria di Savoia; English: Humbert Nicholas Thomas John Maria of Savoy
- House: Savoy
- Father: Victor Emmanuel III
- Mother: Elena of Montenegro

Umberto II (Italian: Umberto Nicola Tommaso Giovanni Maria di Savoia; 15 September 1904 – 18 March 1983) was the last King of Italy. Umberto's reign lasted for 34 days, from 9 May 1946 until his formal deposition on 12 June 1946, although he had been the de facto head of state since 1944. Due to his short reign, he was nicknamed the May King (Italian: Re di maggio).

Umberto was the third child and only son among the five children of Victor Emmanuel III and Elena of Montenegro. As heir apparent to the throne, he received a customary military education and pursued a military career afterwards. In 1940, he commanded an army group during the brief Italian invasion of France shortly before the French capitulation. In 1942, he was promoted to Marshal of Italy but was otherwise inactive as an army commander during much of World War II. Umberto turned against the war following Italian defeats at Stalingrad and El Alamein, and tacitly supported the ousting of Benito Mussolini.

In 1944, Victor Emmanuel, compromised by his association with Italian fascism and desperate to repair the monarchy's image, transferred most of his powers to Umberto. He transferred his remaining powers to Umberto later in 1944 and named him Lieutenant General (Luogotenente) of the Realm; while retaining the title of King. As the country prepared for the 1946 Italian institutional referendum on the continuation of the Italian monarchy, Victor Emmanuel abdicated his throne in favour of Umberto, aspiring to bolster the monarchy with his exit. The June 1946 referendum saw voters voting to abolish the monarchy, and Italy was declared a republic days later. Umberto departed the country; he and other male members of the House of Savoy were barred from returning. He lived out the rest of his life in exile in Cascais, on the Portuguese Riviera. He died in Geneva, Switzerland in 1983.

== Early life ==
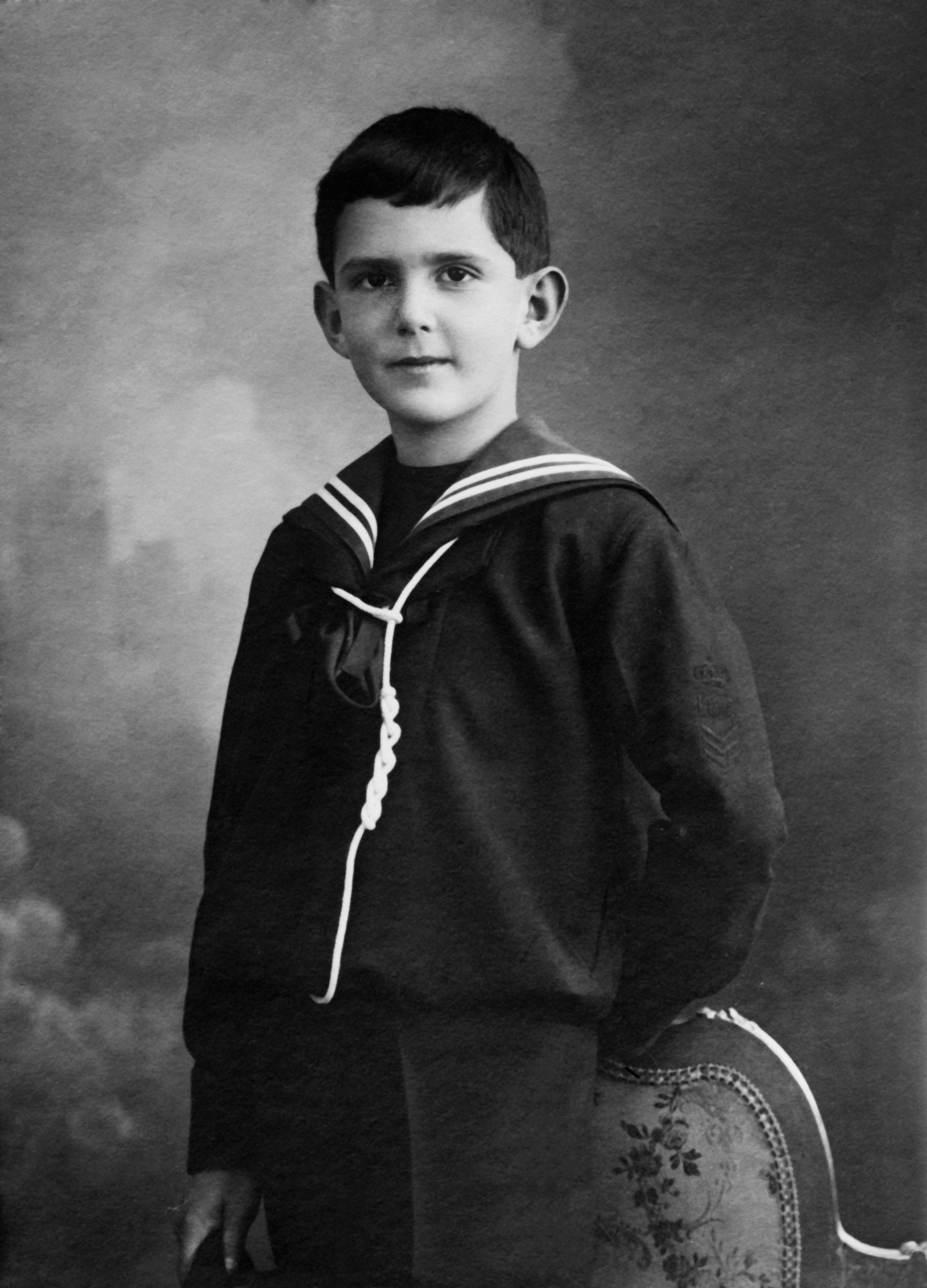
Photo of Umberto, Prince of Piedmont, prior to the First World War

Umberto was born at the Castle of Racconigi in Piedmont. He was the third child and the only son of King Victor Emmanuel III of Italy and his wife, Jelena of Montenegro. As such, he was heir apparent from birth since the Italian throne was limited to male descendants. He was accorded the title Prince of Piedmont, which the Royal Decree formalised on 29 September 1904.

During the crisis of May 1915, when Victor Emmanuel III decided to break the terms of the Triple Alliance by declaring war on the Austro-Hungarian Empire, he found himself in a quandary as the Italian Parliament was against declaring war; several times, the king discussed abdication, with the throne to pass to the 2nd Duke of Aosta instead of Umberto. The British historian Denis Mack Smith wrote that it is not entirely clear why Victor Emmanuel was prepared to sacrifice his 10-year-old son's right to succeed to the throne in favour of the Duke of Aosta.

Umberto was brought up in an authoritarian and militaristic household and was expected to "show an exaggerated deference to his father"; both in private and public, Umberto always had to get down on his knees and kiss his father's hand before being allowed to speak, even as an adult, and he was expected to stand to attention and salute whenever his father entered a room. Umberto was given the formal military education of a Savoyard prince and like the other Savoyard princes before him, Umberto received an education that was notably short on politics; Savoyard monarchs customarily excluded politics from their heirs' education with the expectation that they would learn about the art of politics when they inherited the throne.

Umberto was the first cousin of King Alexander I of Yugoslavia. In a 1959 interview, Umberto told the Italian newspaper La Settimana Incom Illustrata that in 1922 his father had felt that appointing Benito Mussolini as prime minister was a "justifiable risk".

== Career as Prince of Piedmont ==
=== State visit to South America, 1924 ===
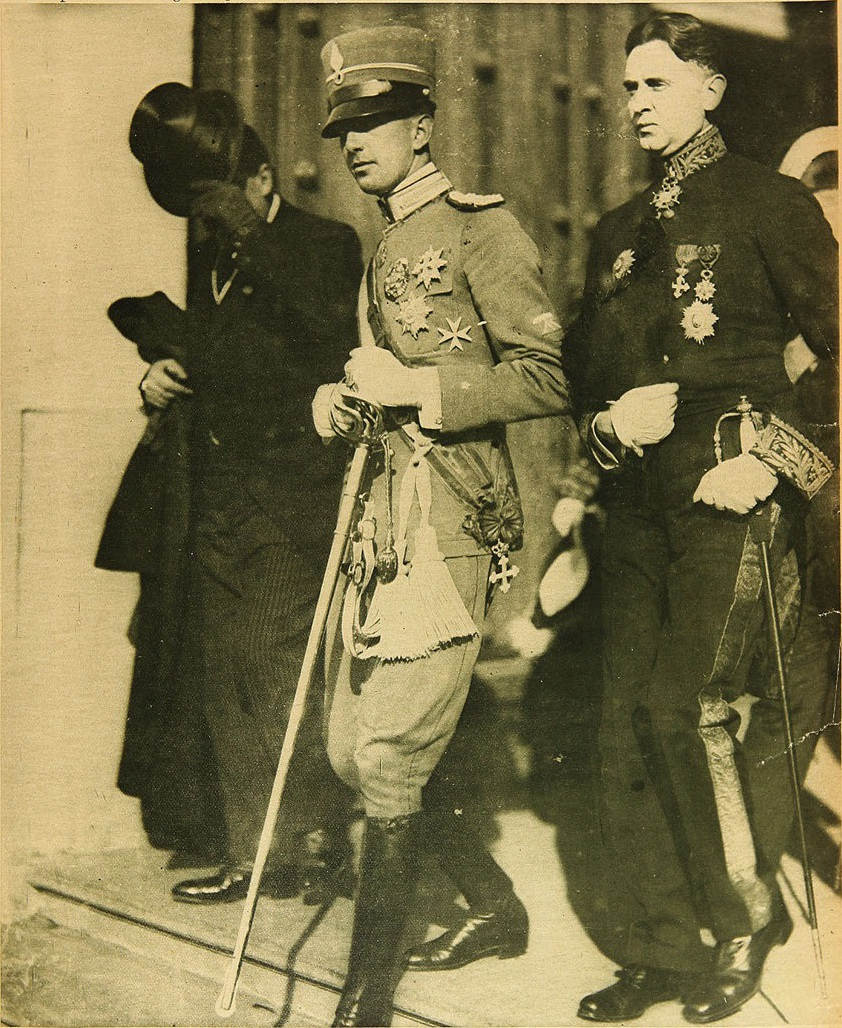
Prince Umberto during his visit to Chile, in 1924

As Prince of Piedmont, Umberto visited South America, between July and September 1924. With his preceptor, Bonaldi, he went to Brazil, Uruguay, Argentina and Chile. This trip was part of the political plan of Fascism to link the Italian people living outside of Italy with their mother country and the interests of the regime. In Brazil, visits were scheduled to the national capital Rio de Janeiro and the State of São Paulo, where the largest Italian colony in the country lived. However, a major rebellion broke out on 5 July 1924, when Umberto had already departed from Europe, imposing a change in the Royal tour. The prince had to stop in Salvador, the capital of Bahia, to supply the ships, going directly to the other countries of South America. On his return, Umberto could only be received in Salvador again. Governor Góis Calmon, the Italian colony and other entities warmly welcomed the heir to the Italian Throne.

=== Military positions and attempted assassination ===
Umberto was educated for a military career and in time became the commander-in-chief of the Northern Armies, and then the Southern ones. This role was merely formal, the de facto command belonging to his father, King Victor Emmanuel III, who jealously guarded his power of supreme command from Il Duce, Benito Mussolini. By mutual agreement, Umberto and Mussolini always kept a distance. In 1926, Mussolini passed a law allowing the Fascist Grand Council to decide the succession, though in practice he admitted the prince would succeed his father.

An attempted assassination took place in Brussels on 24 October 1929, the day of the announcement of his betrothal to Princess Marie José. Umberto was about to lay a wreath on the Tomb of the Belgian Unknown Soldier at the foot of the Colonne du Congrès when, with a cry of 'Down with Mussolini!', Fernando de Rosa fired a single shot that missed him.

De Rosa was arrested and, under interrogation, claimed to be a member of the Second International who had fled Italy to avoid arrest for his political views. His trial was a major political event, and although he was found guilty of attempted murder, he was given a light sentence of five years in prison. This sentence caused a political uproar in Italy and a brief rift in Belgian-Italian relations, but in March 1932 Umberto asked for a pardon for de Rosa, who was released after having served slightly less than half his sentence and was eventually killed in the Spanish Civil War.

=== Visit to Italian Somaliland ===
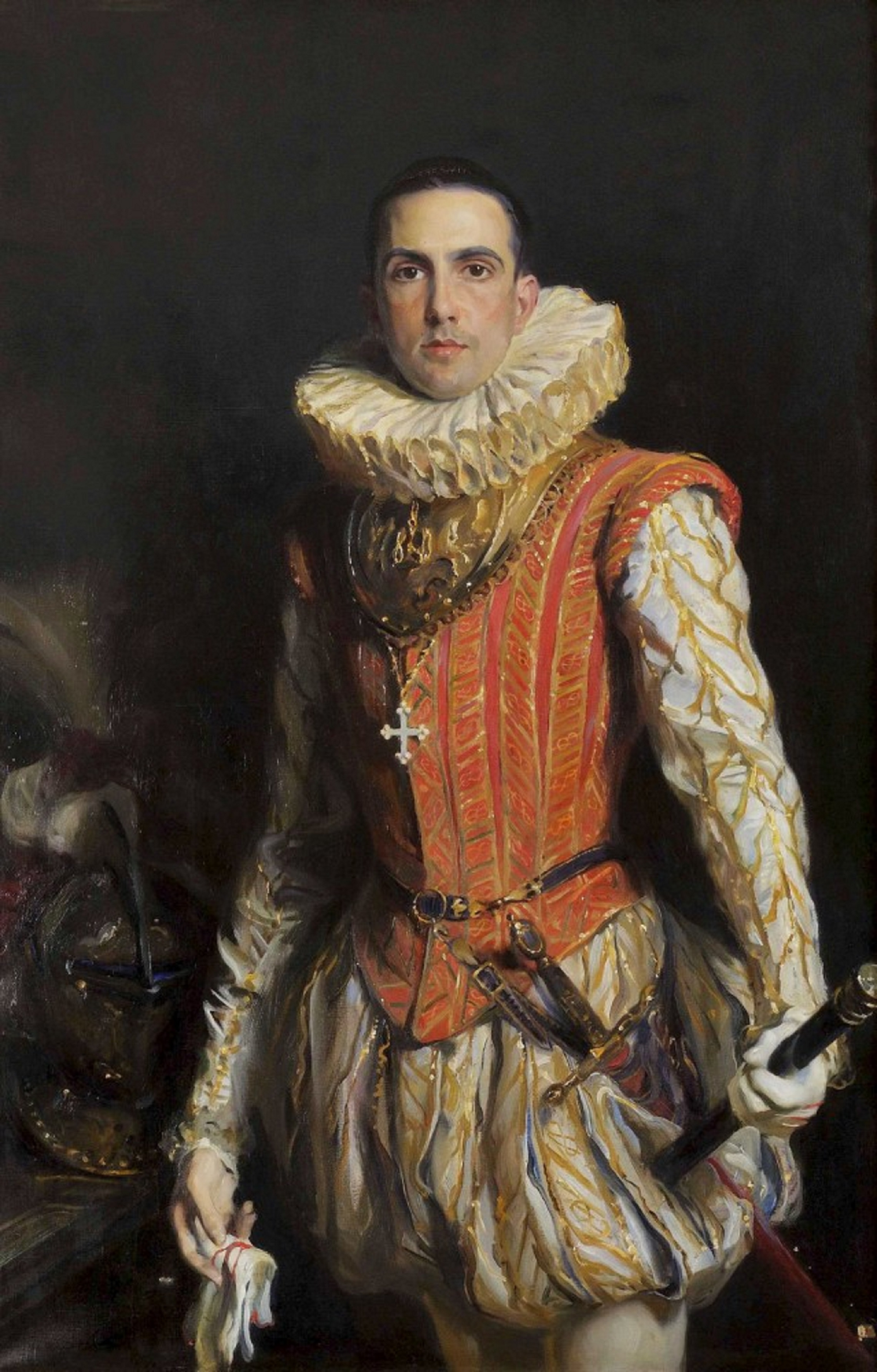
Portrait by Philip de László, 1928

In 1928, after the colonial authorities in Italian Somaliland built Mogadishu Cathedral (Cattedrale di Mogadiscio), Umberto made his first publicised visit to Mogadishu, the territory's capital. The completion and consecration of the cathedral was specifically timed for his arrival in the colony. Umberto made his second publicised visit to Italian Somaliland in October 1934.

=== Marriage and issue ===
Umberto was married in the city of Rome on 8 January 1930 to Princess Marie José of Belgium (1906–2001), the daughter of King Albert I of the Belgians and his wife, Queen Elisabeth (née Duchess Elisabeth in Bavaria).

They had four children:

- Princess Maria Pia (born 1934)
- Prince Vittorio Emanuele (1937–2024)
- Princess Maria Gabriella (born 1940)
- Princess Maria Beatrice (born 1943)

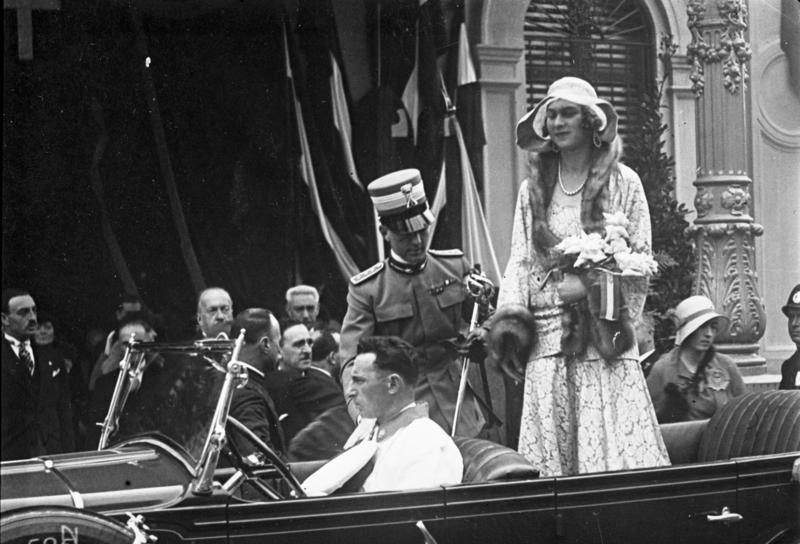
The Prince and Princess of Piedmont in 1930

=== Under the Fascist Regime ===
Following the Savoyards' tradition ("Only one Savoy reigns at a time"), Umberto was kept apart from active politics until he was named Lieutenant General of the Realm. He made an exception when Adolf Hitler asked for a meeting. This was not considered proper, given the international situation; thereafter, Umberto was more rigorously excluded from political events. In 1935, Umberto supported the war against the Ethiopian Empire, which he called a "legitimate war" that even Giovanni Giolitti would have supported had he still been alive. Umberto wanted to serve in the Ethiopian war, but was prevented from doing so by his father, who did, however, allow four royal dukes to serve in East Africa. Umberto conformed to his father's expectations and behaved like an army officer; the prince obediently got down on his knees to kiss his father's hand before speaking. However, Umberto privately resented what he regarded as a deeply humiliating relationship with his cold and emotionally distant father. Umberto's attitude toward the Fascist regime varied: at times, he mocked the more pompous aspects of Fascism and his father for supporting such a regime, while at other times, he praised Mussolini as a great leader.

=== Italian expansion during the Second World War ===
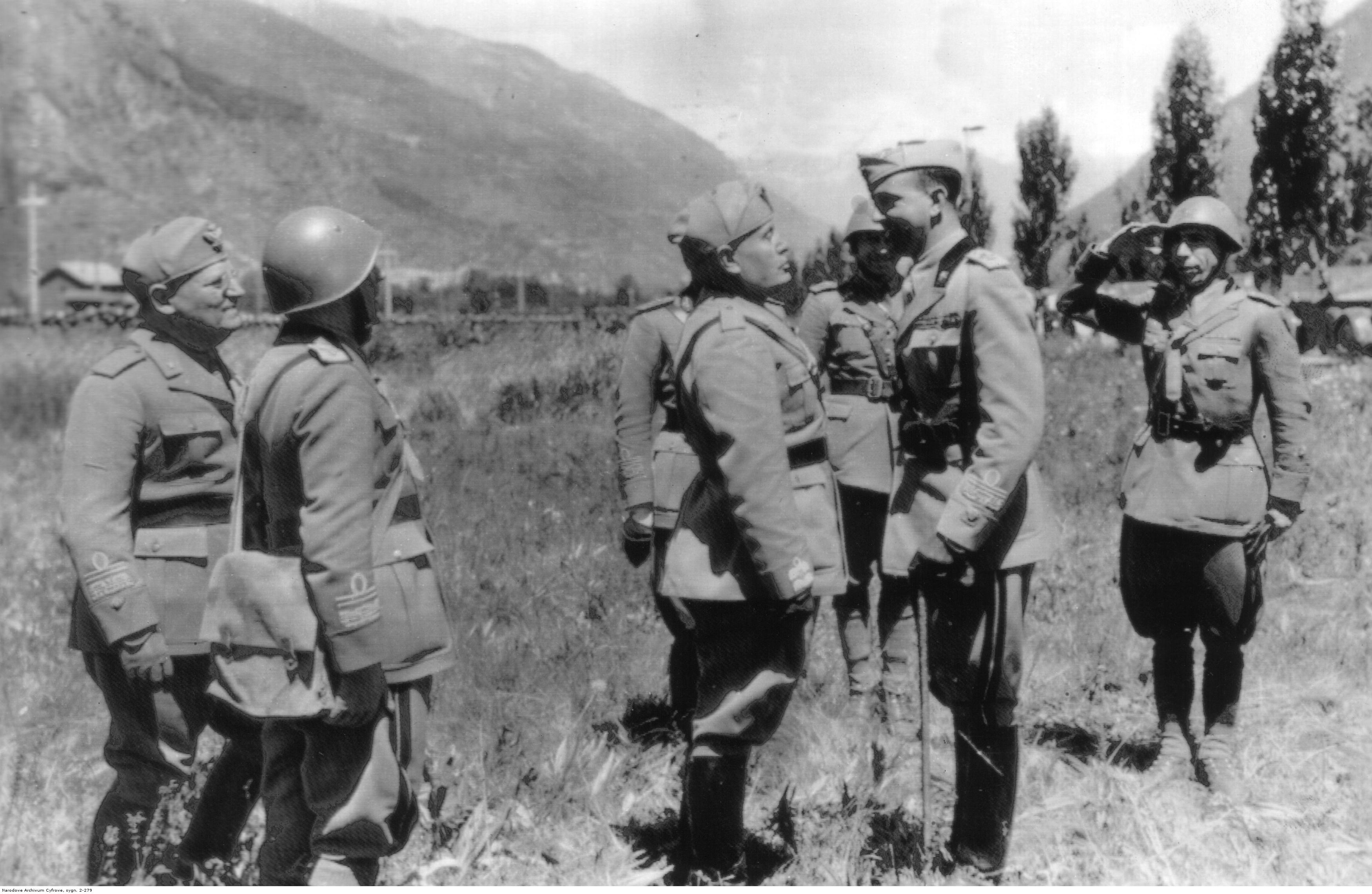
Umberto in conversation with Benito Mussolini in the French Alps during the Italian invasion of France, June 1940

Umberto shared his father's fears that Mussolini's policy of alliance with Nazi Germany was reckless and dangerous, but he made no move to oppose Italy becoming one of the Axis powers. When Mussolini decided to enter the Second World War in June 1940, Umberto hinted to his father that he should use the royal veto to block the Italian declarations of war on Britain and France, but was ignored. After the war, Umberto criticised the decision to enter the war, saying that Victor Emmanuel was too much under "Mussolini's spell" in June 1940 to oppose it. Following Italy's entry into the war, Umberto ostensibly commanded Army Group West, made up of the First, Fourth and the Seventh Army (kept in reserve), which attacked French forces during the Italian invasion of France. Umberto was appointed to this position by his father, who wanted the expected Italian victory to also be a victory for the House of Savoy, as the King feared Mussolini's ambitions. A few hours after France signed an armistice with Germany on 21 June 1940, the Italians invaded France. The Italian offensive was a complete fiasco, with Umberto's reputation as a general only being saved by the fact that the already defeated French signed an armistice with Italy on 24 June 1940. Thus, he could present the offensive as a victory. The Italian plans called for the Regio Esercito to reach the Rhone river valley, which the Italians came nowhere close to reaching, having penetrated only a few kilometres into France.

After the capitulation of France, Mussolini kept Umberto inactive as an Army commander. In the summer of 1940, Umberto was to command a planned invasion of the Kingdom of Yugoslavia. Still, Mussolini subsequently cancelled the invasion of Yugoslavia in favour of invading the Kingdom of Greece. In June 1941, supported by his father, Umberto strongly lobbied to be given command of the Italian expeditionary force sent to the Soviet Union, saying that, as a Catholic, he fully supported Operation Barbarossa and wanted to do battle with the "godless communists". Mussolini refused the request, and instead gave Umberto the responsibility of training the Italian forces scheduled to participate in Operation Hercules, the planned Axis invasion of Malta. On 29 October 1942, he was awarded the rank of Marshal of Italy (Maresciallo d'Italia). During October–November 1942, in the Battle of El Alamein, the Italo-German force was defeated by the British Eighth Army, marking the end of Axis hopes of conquering Egypt. The Axis retreated back into Libya. In November 1942, as part of the Battle of Stalingrad, the Red Army launched Operation Uranus, which saw the Soviets annihilate much of the Italian expeditionary force in Russia and encircle the German 6th Army. The disastrous Italian defeats at Stalingrad and El Alamein turned Umberto against the war and led him to conclude that Italy must sign an armistice before it was too late. In late 1942, Umberto had his cousin, the 4th Duke of Aosta, visit Switzerland to contact the British consulate in Geneva, where he passed on a message to London that the King was willing to sign an armistice with the Allies in exchange for a promise that he be allowed to keep his throne.

=== Attempts at armistice ===
In 1943, Marie José, Princess of Piedmont, involved herself in vain attempts to arrange a separate peace treaty between Italy and the United States. Her interlocutor from the Vatican was Giovanni Battista Monsignor Montini, a senior Papal diplomat who later became Pope Paul VI. Her attempts were not sponsored by her father-in-law, the King, and Umberto was not (directly at least) involved in them. Victor Emmanuel III was anti-clerical, distrusting the Catholic Church, and wanted nothing to do with a peace attempt made through Papal intermediaries. More importantly, Victor Emmanuel was proudly misogynistic, holding women in complete contempt as the King believed it to be a scientific fact that the brains of women were significantly less developed than the brains of men. Victor Emmanuel simply did not believe that Marie José was competent to serve as a diplomat. For all these reasons, the King vetoed Marie José's peace attempt. After her failure – she never met the American agents – she was sent with her children to Sarre, in the Aosta Valley, and isolated from the political life of the Royal House.

In the first half of 1943, as the war continued to go badly for Italy, several senior Fascist officials, upon learning that the Allies would never sign an armistice with Mussolini, began to plot his overthrow with the support of the King. Adding to their worries were a number of strikes in Milan starting on 5 March 1943, with the workers openly criticising both the war and the Fascist regime which had led Italy into the war, leading to fears in Rome that Italy was on the brink of revolution. The strike wave in Milan quickly spread to the industrial city of Turin, where the working class likewise denounced the war and Fascism. The fact that during the strikes in Milan and Turin, Italian soldiers fraternised with the striking workers, who used slogans associated with the banned Socialist and Communist parties, deeply worried Italy's conservative establishment. By this point, the successive Italian defeats had so psychologically shattered Mussolini that he become close to being catatonic, staring into space for hours on end and saying the war would soon turn around for the Axis because it had to, leading even his closest admirers to become disillusioned and to begin looking for a new leader. Umberto was seen as supportive of these efforts to depose Mussolini, but as Ciano (who had turned against Mussolini by this point) complained in his diary, the prince was far too passive, refusing to make a move or even state his views unless his father expressed his approval first.

On 10 July 1943, in Operation Husky, the Allies invaded Sicily. Just before the invasion of Sicily, Umberto had gone on an inspection tour of the Italian forces in Sicily and reported to his father that the Italians had no hope of holding Sicily. Mussolini had assured the King that the Regio Esercito could hold Sicily, and the poor performance of the Italian forces defending Sicily helped to persuade the King to finally dismiss Mussolini, as Umberto informed his father that Il Duce had lied to him. On 16 July 1943, the visiting Papal Assistant Secretary of State told the American diplomats in Madrid that King Victor Emmanuel III and Prince Umberto were now hated by the Italian people even more than Mussolini. By this time, many Fascist gerarchi had become convinced that it was necessary to depose Mussolini to save the Fascist system, and on the night of 24–25 July 1943, at a meeting of the Fascist Grand Council, a motion introduced by the gerarca Dino Grandi to take away Mussolini's powers was approved by a vote of 19 to 8. The fact that the majority of the Fascist Grand Council voted for the motion showed just how disillusioned the Fascist gerarchi had become with Mussolini by the summer of 1943. The intransigent and radical group of Fascists led by the gerarchi Roberto Farinacci, who wanted to continue the war, were only a minority, while the majority of the gerarchi supported Grandi's call to jettison Mussolini as the best way of saving Fascism.

On 25 July 1943, Victor Emmanuel III finally dismissed Mussolini and appointed Marshal Pietro Badoglio, as prime minister with secret orders to negotiate an armistice with the Allies. Baron Raffaele Guariglia, the Italian ambassador to Spain, contacted British diplomats to begin the negotiations. Badoglio went about the negotiations halfheartedly while allowing many German forces to enter Italy. The American historian Gerhard Weinberg wrote that Badoglio as prime minister "...did almost everything as stupidly and slowly as possible", as he dragged out the secret peace talks going on in Lisbon and Tangier, being unwilling to accept the Allied demand for unconditional surrender. During the secret armistice talks, Badoglio told Count Pietro d'Acquarone that he thought he might get better terms if Victor Emmanuel abdicated in favour of Umberto, complaining that the armistice terms that the King wanted were unacceptable to the Allies. D'Acquarone told Badoglio to keep his views to himself as the King was completely unwilling to abdicate, all the more so as he believed that Umberto was unfit to be monarch.

=== Partition of Italy ===
On 17 August 1943, Sicily was taken and the last Axis forces crossed over to the Italian mainland. On 3 September 1943, the British Eighth Army landed on the Italian mainland at Reggio Calabria while the U.S. 5th Army landed at Salerno on 9 September 1943, a few hours after it was announced that Italy had signed an armistice. Adolf Hitler had other plans for Italy, and in response to the Italian armistice ordered Operation Achse on 8 September 1943, as the Germans turned against their Italian allies and occupied all of the parts of Italy not taken by the Allies. In response to the German occupation of Italy, neither Victor Emmanuel nor Marshal Pietro Badoglio made any effort at organised resistance; they instead issued vague instructions to the Italian military and civil servants to do their best and fled Rome during the night of 8–9 September 1943. Not trusting his son, Victor Emmanuel had told Umberto nothing about his attempts to negotiate an armistice nor about his plans to flee Rome if the Germans should occupy it. For the first time in his life, Umberto openly criticised his father, saying the King of Italy should not be fleeing Rome and only reluctantly obeyed his father's orders to go south with him towards the Allied lines. The King and the rest of the Royal Family fled Rome via a car to Ortona to board a corvette, the Baionetta, that took them south. A small riot occurred at the Ortona dock as about 200 senior-ranking Italian military officers, who had abandoned their commands and unexpectedly showed up, begged the King to take them with him. Almost all of them were refused permission to board, making the struggle to get to the head of the queue pointless. With the exceptions of Marshal Enrico Caviglia, General Calvi di Bergolo and General Antonio Sorice, the Italian generals simply abandoned their posts on the night of 8–9 September to try to flee south, which greatly facilitated the German take-over, as the Regio Esercito was left without senior leadership. On the morning of 9 September 1943, Umberto arrived with Victor Emmanuel and Badoglio in Brindisi.

In September 1943, Italy was partitioned between the south of Italy, administered by the Italian government with an Allied Control Commission (ACC) having supervisory powers, while Germany occupied northern and central Italy with a puppet Italian Social Republic (popularly called the Salò Republic), headed by Mussolini holding nominal power. By 16 September 1943, a line had formed across Italy with everything to the north held by the Germans and to the south by the Allies. Because of what Weinberg called the "extraordinary incompetence" of Badoglio, who, like Victor Emmanuel, had not anticipated Operation Achse until it was far too late, thousands of Italian soldiers with no leadership were taken prisoner by the Germans without resisting in the Balkans, France and Italy itself, to be taken off to work as slave labour in factories in Germany, an experience that many did not survive. How Victor Emmanuel mishandled the armistice was to become almost as controversial in Italy as his support for Fascism. Under the terms of the armistice, the ACC had the ultimate power with the Royal Italian Government in the south, being in many ways a similar position to the Italian Social Republic under the Germans. However, as the British historian James Holland noted, the crucial difference was that: "In the south, Italy was now moving closer towards democracy". In the part of Italy under the control of the ACC, which issued orders to the Italian civil servants, freedom of the press, association and expression were restored along with other civil rights and liberties.

During 1943–45, the Italian economy collapsed with much of the infrastructure destroyed, inflation rampant, the black market becoming the dominant form of economic activity, and food shortages reducing much of the population to the brink of starvation in both northern and southern Italy. In 1943–44, the cost of living in southern Italy skyrocketed by 321%, while it was estimated that people in Naples needed 2,000 calories per day to survive while the average Neapolitan was doing well if they consumed 500 calories a day in 1943–44. Naples in 1944 was described as a city without cats or dogs which had all been eaten by the Neapolitans, while much of the female population of Naples turned to prostitution to survive. As dire as the economic situation was in southern Italy, food shortages and inflation were even worse in northern Italy as the Germans carried out a policy of ruthless economic exploitation. Since the war in which Mussolini had involved Italy in 1940 had become such an utter catastrophe for the Italian people by 1943, it had the effect of discrediting all those associated with the Fascist system, including Victor Emmanuel. In late 1943, Victor Emmanuel stated that he felt he bore no responsibility for Italy's plight, for appointing Mussolini as prime minister in 1922 and for entering the war in 1940. This further increased his unpopularity and led to demands that he abdicate at once.

In northern Italy, a guerrilla war began against the fascists, both Italian and German, with most of the guerrilla units fighting under the banner of the National Liberation Committee (Comitato di Liberazione Nazionale-CLN), who were very strongly left-wing and republican. Of the six parties that made up the CLN, the Communists, the Socialists and the Action Party were republican; the Christian Democrats and the Labour Party were ambiguous on the "institutional question", and only the Liberal Party was committed to preserving the monarchy, though many individual Liberals were republicans. Only a minority of the partisan bands fighting for the CLN were monarchists, and a prince of the House of Savoy led none. After the war, Umberto claimed that he wanted to join the partisans, and only his wartime duties prevented him from doing so. The Italian Royal Court relocated itself to Brindisi in the south of Italy after fleeing Rome. In the fall of 1943, many Italian monarchists, like Benedetto Croce and Count Carlo Sforza, pressed for Victor Emmanuel III to abdicate and for Umberto to renounce his right to the succession in favour of his 6-year-old son, with a regency council to govern Italy as the best hope of saving the monarchy. Count Sforza tried to interest the British members of the ACC in this plan, calling Victor Emmanuel a "despicable weakling" and Umberto "a pathological case", saying neither was qualified to rule Italy. However, given the unwillingness of the King to abdicate, nothing came of it.

At a meeting of the leading politicians from the six revived political parties on 13 January 1944 in Bari, the demand was made that the ACC should force Victor Emmanuel to abdicate to "wash away the shame of the past". Beyond removing Victor Emmanuel, which everyone at the Congress of Bari wanted, the Italian politicians differed, with some calling for a republic to be proclaimed at once, some willing to see Umberto succeed to the throne, others wanting Umberto to renounce his claim to the throne in favour of his son, and finally those who were willing to accept Umberto as Luogotenente Generale del Regno (English: Lieutenant General of the Realm) to govern in place of his father. Since northern and central Italy were still occupied by Germany, it was finally decided at the Bari conference that the "institutional question" should be settled only once all of Italy was liberated, so all of the Italian people could have their say.

=== Outing and appointment as regent ===
In the Salò Republic, Mussolini returned to his original republicanism and, as part of his attack on the House of Savoy, Fascist newspapers in the area under the control of the Italian Social Republic outed Umberto, calling him Stellassa ("Ugly Starlet" in the Piedmontese language). The Fascist newspapers reported in a lurid, sensationalist, and decidedly homophobic way Umberto's various relationships with men as a way of discrediting him. It was after Umberto was outed by the Fascist press in late 1943 that the issue of his homosexuality came to widespread public notice.

As the Allies freed more and more of Italy from the Salò Republic, it became apparent that Victor Emmanuel was too tainted by his previous support of Fascism to have any further role. A sign of how unpopular the House of Savoy had become was that on 28 March 1944, when the Italian Communist leader Palmiro Togliatti returned to Italy after a long exile in the Soviet Union, he did not press for an immediate proclamation of a republic. Togliatti wanted the monarchy to continue as the best way of winning the Communists' support after the war. For the same reason, Count Sforza wanted a republic as soon as possible, arguing the House of Savoy was far too closely associated with Fascism to enjoy moral legitimacy, and the only hope of establishing a liberal democracy in Italy after the war was a republic. By this point, the government of Pietro Badoglio was so unpopular with the Italian people that Umberto was willing to accept the support of any party with a mass following, even the Communists. The fact that contrary to expectations, Togliatti and Badoglio got along very well, led to widespread fears amongst liberal-minded Italians that a Togliatti-Badoglio duumvirate might emerge, forming an alliance between what rapidly was becoming Italy's largest mass party and the military. The power and influence of Badoglio's government, based in Salerno, was very limited, but the entry of the Communists, followed by representatives of the other anti-Fascist parties, into the Cabinet of that government in April 1944 marked the moment when, as the British historian David Ellwood noted, "...anti-Fascism had compromised with the traditional state and the defenders of Fascism, and the Communist Party had engineered this compromise. A quite new phase in Italy's liberation was opening". Besides the "institutional question", the principle responsibility of the Royal Italian Government was the reconstruction of the liberated areas of Italy. As the Allies pushed northwards, aside from the damage caused by the fighting, the retreating Germans systematically destroyed all of the infrastructure, leading to a humanitarian disaster in the liberated parts. Umberto, together with the rest of his father's government, spent time attempting to have humanitarian aid delivered.

Under intense pressure from Robert Murphy and Harold Macmillan of the ACC at a meeting on 10 April 1944, Victor Emmanuel transferred most of his powers to Umberto. The King bitterly told Lieutenant General Sir Noel Mason-MacFarlane that Umberto was unqualified to rule, and that handing power over to him was equivalent to letting the Communists come to power. However, events had moved beyond Victor Emmanuel's ability to control. After Rome was liberated in June, Victor Emmanuel transferred his remaining constitutional powers to Umberto, naming his son Lieutenant General of the Realm. However, Victor Emmanuel retained the title and position of King. During his period as Regent, Umberto saw his father only three times, partly out of a bid to distance himself and partly because of tensions between father and son. Mack Smith wrote that Umberto was: "More attractive and outgoing than his father, he was even more a soldier at heart, and completely inexperienced as a politician...In personality-less astute and intelligent than his father...less obstinate, he was far more open, affable and ready to learn".

As Regent, Umberto initially made a poor impression on almost everyone as he surrounded himself with Fascist-era generals as his advisers, spoke of the military as the basis of his power, frequently threatened to sue for libel anyone who made even the slightest critical remarks about the House of Savoy, and asked the ACC to censor the press to prevent the criticism of himself or his father. The British Foreign Secretary, Anthony Eden, wrote after meeting Umberto, in a message to London, that he was "the poorest of poor creatures", and his only qualification for the throne was that he had more charm than his charmless father. The historian and philosopher Benedetto Croce, a minister in Badoglio's cabinet, called Umberto "entirely insignificant" as he found the Prince of Piedmont to be shallow, vain, superficial, and of low intelligence, and alluding to his homosexuality stated his private life was "tainted by scandal".

The diplomat and politician Count Carlo Sforza wrote in his diary that Umberto was utterly unqualified to be King as he called the prince "a stupid young man who knew nothing of the real Italy" and "he had been as closely associated with fascism as his father. In addition he is weak and dissipated, with a degenerate and even oriental disposition inherited from his Balkan mother". Sam Reber, an American official with the ACC, who had known Umberto before the war, met the prince in Naples in early 1944 and wrote he found him "greatly improved. The Balkan playboy period was over. But he has a weak face and, to judge by first meeting, has not, I should say, the personality to inspire confidence and devotion in others". More damaging, Victor Emmanuel let it be known that he regretted handing over his powers to his son, and made clear that he felt that Umberto was unfit to succeed him as part of a bid to take back his lost powers.

After Togliatti and the Communists entered Badoglio's cabinet, taking the oaths of loyalty to Umberto in the so-called Svolta di Salerno ("Salerno turn"), the leaders of the other anti-Fascist parties felt they had no choice but to join the cabinet as to continue to boycott it might lead Italy to be open to Communist domination. The other parties entered the cabinet on 22 April 1944 to preempt the Communists who joined the cabinet on 24 April. The Christian Democratic leader Alcide De Gasperi believed in 1944 that a popular vote would ensure a republic immediately, and sources from the Vatican suggested to him that only 25% of Italians favoured continuing the monarchy. The Catholic Church was in favour of Umberto, who, unlike his father, was a sincere Catholic who it was believed would keep the Communists out of power. However, De Gasperi admitted that though the monarchy was a conservative institution, "it was difficult to answer the argument that the monarchy had done little to serve the interests of the country or people during the past thirty years".

Umberto's relations with the Allies were strained by his insistence that after the war, Italy should keep all of its colonial empire, including Ethiopia and the parts of Yugoslavia that Mussolini had annexed in 1941. Both the British and Americans told Umberto that Ethiopia had its independence restored in 1941 and would not revert to Italian rule, while the Allies had promised that Yugoslavia would be restored to its pre-war frontiers after the war. Umberto later stated that he would have never signed the peace treaty of 1947 under which Italy renounced its empire. On 15 April 1944, in an interview with The Daily Express, Umberto stated his hope that Italy would become a full Allied power, expressing his wish that the Regia Marina would fight in the Pacific against the Empire of Japan and the Regio Esercito would march alongside the other Allied armies in invading Germany. In the same interview, Umberto stated that he wanted post-war Italy to have a government "patterned on the British monarchy, and at the same time incorporating as much of America's political framework as possible". Umberto admitted that, in retrospect, his father had made grave mistakes as King and criticised Victor Emmanuel for a suffocating childhood, where he was never permitted to express his personality or hold views of his own. In the same interview, Umberto stated that he hoped to make Italy a democracy by executing "the vastest education programme Italy has ever seen" to eliminate illiteracy in Italy once and for all.

A few days later, on 19 April 1944, Umberto in an interview with The Times complained that the ACC was too liberal in giving Italians too much freedom, as the commissioners "seemed to expect the Italian people to run before they could walk". In the same interview, Umberto demanded the ACC censor the Italian press to end the criticism of the Royal Family, and claimed he had no choice but to support Mussolini because otherwise he would have been disinherited. Finally, Umberto made the controversial statement that Mussolini "at first had the full support of the nation" in bringing Italy into the war in June 1940. Victor Emmanuel III had only signed the declarations of war because "there was no sign that the nation wanted it otherwise. No single voice was raised in protest. No demand was made for summoning parliament". The interview with The Times caused a storm of controversy in Italy, with many Italians objecting to Umberto's claim that the responsibility for Italy entering the war rested with ordinary Italians and his apparent ignorance of the difficulties of holding public protests under the Fascist regime in 1940. Sforza wrote in his diary of his belief that Victor Emmanuel, "that little monster", had put Umberto up to the interview to discredit his son. Croce wrote:

"The Prince of Piedmont for twenty-two years has never shown any sign of acting independently of his father. Now he is simply repeating his father's arguments. He chooses to do this at the very moment when, having been designated lieutenant of the kingdom, he ought to be overcoming doubt and distrust as I personally hoped he would succeed in doing. To me it seems unworthy to try to unload the blame and errors of royalty on the people. I, an old monarchist, am therefore especially grieved when I see the monarchs themselves working to discredit the monarchy".

Various Italian politicians had attempted to persuade the Allies to revise the armistice of 1943 in Italy's favour because there was a difference between the Fascist regime and the Italian people. Umberto's statement that the House of Savoy bore no responsibility when he asserted that the Italian people had been of one mind with Mussolini in June 1940, was widely seen as weakening the case for revising the armistice.

=== Liberation and republicanism ===
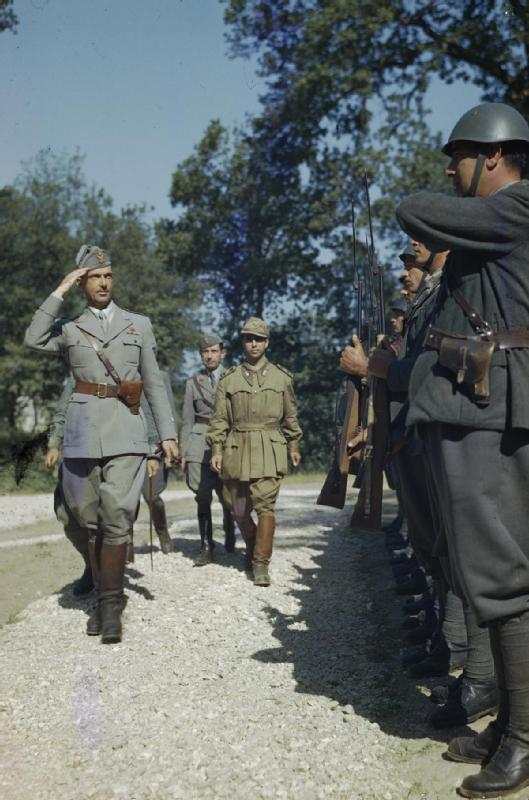
Umberto inspecting a guard of honour of the Italian Liberation Corps in Sparanise, May 1944

Most of the Committee of National Liberation (CLN) leaders operating underground in the north tended to lean in a republican direction. Still, they were willing to accept Umberto temporarily out of the belief that his personality and widespread rumours about his private life would ensure that he would not last long as either Lieutenant General of the Realm or as King, should his father abdicate. After the liberation of Rome on 6 June 1944, the various Italian political parties all applied strong pressure on Umberto to dismiss Pietro Badoglio as prime minister, as the Duke had loyally served the Fascist regime until the Royal coup on 25 July 1943, which resulted in the social democrat Ivanoe Bonomi being appointed prime minister. On 5 June 1944, Victor Emmanuel formally gave up his powers to Umberto, finally recognising his son as Lieutenant General of the Realm. After the liberation of Rome, Umberto received a warm welcome from ordinary people when he returned to the Eternal City. Mack Smith cautioned that the friendly reception that Umberto received in Rome may have been due to him being a symbol of normalcy after the harsh German occupation as opposed to genuine affection for the prince. During the German occupation, much of the Roman population had lived on the brink of starvation, young people had been arrested on the streets to be taken off to work as slave labourers in Germany, while the Fascist Milizia, together with the Wehrmacht and SS, had committed numerous atrocities. Badoglio, by contrast, was greeted with widespread hostility when he returned to Rome, being blamed by many Italians as the man, together with the King, who was responsible for abandoning Rome to the Germans without a fight in September 1943.

Umberto had ordered Badoglio to bring members of the Committee of National Liberation (CLN) into his cabinet after the liberation of Rome to broaden his basis of support and ensure national unity by preventing the emergence of a rival government. Umberto moved into the Quirinal Palace, while at The Grand Hotel, the Rome branch of the CLN met with the cabinet. Speaking on behalf of the CLN in general, the Roman leadership of the CLN refused to join the cabinet as long as Badoglio headed it but indicated that Bonomi was an acceptable choice as prime minister for them. Lieutenant General Sir Noel Mason-MacFarlane of the ACC visited the Quirinal Palace and convinced Umberto to accept Bonomi as prime minister because the Crown needed to bring the CLN into the government, which required sacrificing Badoglio. As Churchill, Roosevelt and Stalin were willing to see Badoglio continue as prime minister, seeing him as a force for order, Umberto could have held out for him. However, as part of his efforts to distance himself from Fascism, Umberto agreed to appoint Bonomi as prime minister. Reflecting the tense "institutional question" of republic vs. monarchy, Umberto, when swearing in the Bonomi cabinet, allowed the ministers to take either their oaths to himself as the Lieutenant General of the Realm or to the Italian state; Bonomi himself chose to take his oath to Umberto while the rest of his cabinet chose to take their oaths only to the Italian state. Churchill especially disapproved of the replacement of Badoglio with Bonomi, complaining that, in his view, Umberto was being used by "a group of aged and hungry politicians trying to intrigue themselves into an undue share of power". Through the Allied occupation, the Americans were far more supportive of Italian republicanism than the British, with Churchill in particular believing the Italian monarchy was the only institution that was capable of preventing the Italian Communists from coming to power after the war.

Unlike the conservative Badoglio, the social democrat Bonomi started to move Italian politics in an increasingly democratic direction as he argued that King Victor Emmanuel III, who had only turned against Mussolini when it was clear that the war was lost, was unfit to continue as monarch. On 25 June 1944, the Bonomi government, which like Badoglio's government, ruled by Royal Decree as there was no parliament in Italy, had a Royal Decree issued in Umberto's name promising a Constituent Assembly for Italy after the war. As Umberto continued as regent, he surprised many, after his rocky start in the spring of 1944, with greater maturity and judgement than was expected. Croce advised him to make a break with his father by choosing his advisers from the democratic parties, and it was due to Croce's influence that Umberto appointed Falcone Lucifero, a socialist lawyer, as Minister of the Royal House. Lucifero suggested reforms, which were implemented, such as reducing the number of aristocrats and generals at the Royal Court, while bringing in people from all the regions of Italy instead of just Piedmont to make the Royal Court more representative of Italy.

Umberto, in September 1944, vetoed an attempt by the Bonomi government to start an investigation of who was responsible for abandoning Rome in September 1943 as he feared that it would show his father was a coward. The same month, Badoglio, who was kept on as an adviser by Umberto, made an offer to the British and the Americans on behalf of the regent in September 1944 for Italy to be governed by a triumvirate consisting of himself, Bonomi and another former prime minister, Vittorio Orlando, which purged the prefects in the liberated areas who were "agents of Togliatti and Nenni" with Fascist-era civil servants. Badoglio also spoke of Umberto's desire not to lose any territory after the war to Greece, Yugoslavia and France. Badoglio's offer was rejected as Admiral Ellery W. Stone of the ACC was opposed to Umberto's plans to have Bonomi share power with Badoglio and Orlando, seeing this as upsetting the delicately achieved political consensus for no other reason than to increase the Crown's power.

In October 1944, Umberto, in an interview with The New York Times, stated that he favoured a referendum to decide whether Italy was to be a republic or a monarchy instead of having the "institutional question" decided by the national assembly that would write Italy's post-war constitution. Umberto's interview caused controversy as the republican parties widely feared that a referendum would be rigged, especially in the south of Italy. In the same interview, Umberto mentioned his belief that, after the war, monarchies all over the world would move towards the left, and stated that under his leadership Italy would go leftwards "in an ordered, liberal way" as he understood "the weight of the past is the monarchy's greatest handicap", which he would resolve by a "radical revision" of the Statuto Albertino. Umberto spoke favourably of Togliatti as he was "clever, agreeable, and easy to discuss problems with". In private, Umberto said he found Togliatti "to be a very congenial companion whose intelligence he respected, but was afraid that he suited his conversation according to his company".

By late 1944, the question of whether the CLN or the Crown represented the Italian people came to a head. On 25 November 1944, Bonomi resigned as prime minister, saying he could not govern owing to his difficulties with the CLN, and as the politicians could not agree on a successor. Umberto used the impasse to reassert the Crown's powers. The crisis ended on 12 December 1944 with Umberto appointing a new government under Bonomi consisting of ministers from four parties, the most important of which were the Communists and the Christian Democrats. In response to objections from the CLN, Bonomi, in practice, accepted their claim that they represented the Italian people rather than the Crown, while still swearing an oath of loyalty to Umberto as the Lieutenant General of the Realm when he took the prime minister's oath. An attempt by Umberto to have Churchill issue a public statement in favour of the monarchy led Macmillan to warn Umberto to try to be more politically neutral as regent. However, Churchill, during a visit to Rome in January 1945, called Umberto "a far more impressive figure than the politicians". As a gesture to promote national unity after the traumas of the war, in June 1945, Umberto appointed as prime minister, a prominent guerrilla leader, Ferruccio Parri.

In December 1945, Umberto appointed a new, more conservative government under Alcide De Gasperi. One of the first acts of the new government was to announce the High Commission for Sanctions Against Fascism would cease operating as of 31 March 1946 and to start purging from the liberated areas of northern Italy civil servants appointed by the CLN, restoring the career civil servants who had served the Fascist regime back to their former posts. Over the opposition of the left-wing parties who wanted the "institutional question" resolved by the Constituent Assembly, De Gasperi announced that a referendum would be held to decide the "institutional question". At the same time, Italian women were given the right to vote and to hold official office for the first time, again over the opposition of the left-wing parties, who viewed Italian women as more conservative than their menfolk, and believed that female suffrage would benefit the monarchist side in the referendum. The monarchists favoured putting off the referendum as long as possible out of the hope that a return to normalcy would cause the Italians to take a more favourable view of their monarchy, while the republicans wanted a referendum as soon as possible, hoping that wartime radicalisation would work in their favour.

== King of Italy ==
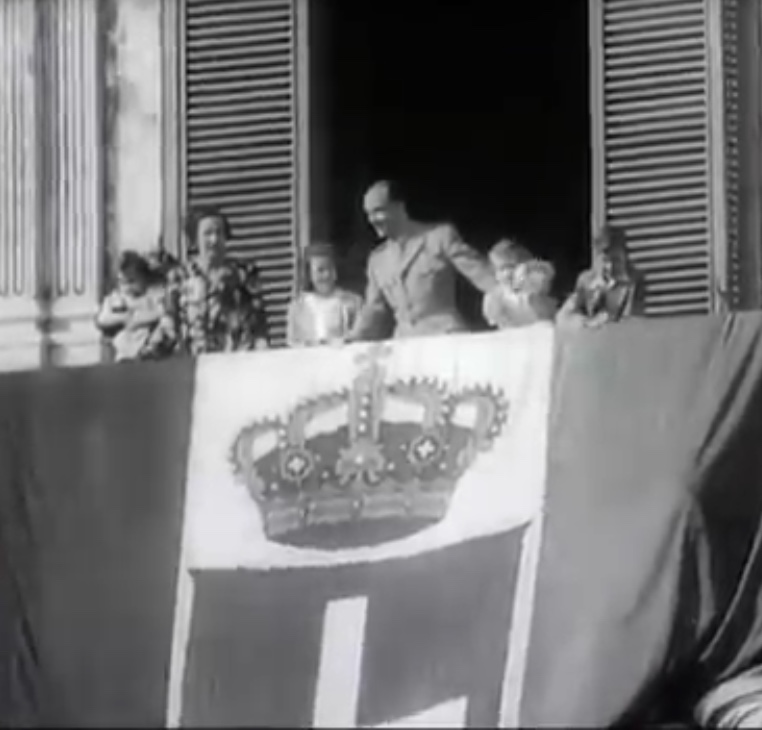
King Umberto II at the Quirinal Palace on his first day as king 10 May 1946

Umberto earned widespread praise for his role in the following three years, with the Italian historian Giuseppe Mammarella calling Umberto a man "whose Fascist past was less compromising" than that of Victor Emmanuel and who, as Lieutenant General of the Realm, showed certain "progressive" tendencies. In April 1946, a public opinion poll of registered members of the conservative Christian Democratic party showed that 73% were republicans, a poll that caused immense panic in the monarchist camp. The American historian Norman Kogan cautioned the poll was of Christian Democratic party members, which was not the same thing as Christian Democratic voters who tended to be "...rural, female, or generally apolitical". Nonetheless, the poll led to appeals from Umberto to the ACC to postpone the referendum, leading to the reply that the De Gasperi cabinet had set the date for the referendum, not the ACC. The possibility of losing the referendum also led the monarchists to appeal to Victor Emmanuel to finally abdicate. De Gasperi and the other Christian Democratic leaders refused to take sides in the referendum, urging Christian Democratic voters to follow their consciences when it came time to vote.

In the belated hope of influencing public opinion ahead of a referendum on the continuation of the monarchy, Victor Emmanuel formally abdicated in favour of Umberto on 9 May 1946 and left for Egypt. Before departing for Egypt, Victor Emmanuel saw Umberto for the last time, saying farewell in a cold, emotionless way. Worried about its future under a Communist government, the Catholic Church framed the referendum not as a choice between republic and monarchy, but Catholicism and Communism. Priests warned churchgoers that "all the pains of hell" would be reserved for those who voted for a republic. On the day before the referendum, 1 June 1946, Pope Pius XII, in a sermon on St. Peter's Square, said in what was widely seen as endorsing Umberto: "What is the problem? The problem is whether one or the other of those nations, of those two Latin sisters [elections were taking place in France on the same day] with several thousands of years of civilisation, will continue to lean against the solid rock of Christianity; ... or on the contrary, do they want to hand over the fate of their future to the impossible omnipotence of a secular state without extraterrestrial ideals, without religion, and without God. One of these two alternatives shall occur according to whether the names of the champions or the destroyers of Christian civilization emerge victorious from the urns." Umberto believed that the support from the Catholic Church would be decisive and that he would win the referendum by a narrow margin. The De Gasperi cabinet accepted Umberto as King, but refused to accept the standard appellation for Italian kings "by the Grace of God and the will of the people".

In northern Italy, which had been the scene of the guerrilla struggle against the Italian Social Republic and the Germans, much of the population had been radicalised by the struggle, and feelings were very much against the monarchy. Kogan wrote Victor Emmanuel's flight from Rome was "bitterly remembered" in the Nord as an act of cowardice and betrayal by the King who abandoned his people to the German occupation without a fight. The socialist leader Sandro Pertini warned Umberto not to campaign in Milan as otherwise he would be lynched by the Milanese working class if he should appear in that city. Republican cartoonists mercilessly mocked Umberto's physical quirks. American historian Anthony Di Renzo described him: "Tall, stiff, and balding, he had smooth, clean-shaven blue cheeks, thin lips, and a weak chin. Dressed in military uniform as First Marshal of the Empire, decorated with the Supreme Order of the Most Holy Annunciation, he seemed more like a majordomo than a king." On the campaign trail, Umberto was received with much more friendliness in the south of Italy than in the north. People in the Mezzogiorno loved their King, who on the campaign trail in Sicily showed an encyclopedic knowledge of Sicilian villages which greatly endeared him to the Sicilians. Umberto's principal arguments for retaining the monarchy were it was the best way to revive Italy as a great power; it was the only institution capable of holding Italy together by checking regional separatism; and it would uphold Catholicism against anti-clericalism. The republicans charged that Umberto had done nothing to oppose Fascism, with his major interest being his "glittering social life" in the high society of Rome and Turin, and that as a general knew that Italy was unready for war in 1940, but did not warn Mussolini against entering the war.

Mack Smith wrote that "some of the more extreme monarchists" expressed doubts about the legitimacy of the referendum, claiming that millions of voters, many of them pro-monarchist, were unable to vote because they had not yet been able to return to their local areas to register. Nor had the issue of Italy's borders been settled definitively, so the voting rights of those in disputed areas had not been satisfactorily clarified. Other allegations were made about voter manipulation, and even the issue of how to interpret the votes became controversial, as it appeared that not just a majority of those validly voting but of those votes cast (including spoiled votes), was needed to reach an outcome in the event the monarchy lost by a tight margin.

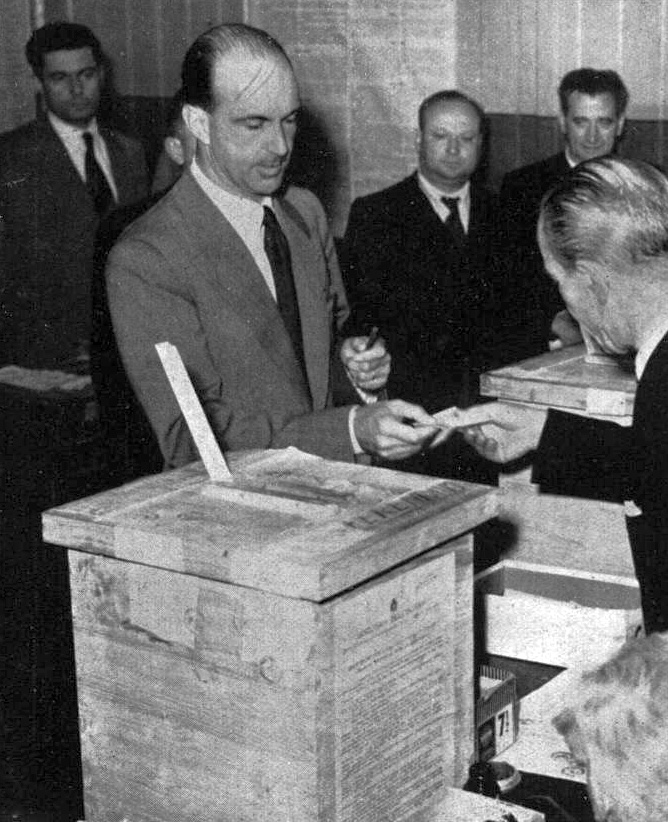
Umberto casting his vote in the 1946 Italian institutional referendum

On the 2 June 1946 referendum, which saw the participation of almost 90% of voters, over 54% majority voted to make Italy a republic. The conservative, rural Mezzogiorno (southern Italy) region voted solidly for the monarchy while the more urbanised and industrialised Nord (northern Italy) voted equally firmly for a republic. In northern Italy, which had been ruled by the Italian Social Republic, the charges of homosexuality made against Umberto had an impact on the voters, causing at least some conservatives to vote for the republic. From his exile in Egypt, where King Farouk had welcomed him as a guest, Victor Emmanuel expressed no surprise at the result of the referendum as he always viewed Umberto as a failure who was unfit to be King, and claimed that the monarchists would have won the referendum if only he had not abdicated. Umberto himself had expected to win the referendum and was deeply shocked when the majority of his subjects chose a republic.

The republic was formally proclaimed four days later, ending Umberto's brief (effective 12 June) 34-day reign as King. Umberto at first refused to accept what he called "the outrageous illegality" of the referendum and took his deposition badly. In his last official statement as King, Umberto refused to accept the republic, saying he was the victim of a coup d'état by his ministers and the referendum had been rigged against him. In response, De Gasperi, who became Acting President, replied in a press statement:

"We must strive to understand the tragedy of someone who, after inheriting a military defeat and a disastrous complicity with dictatorship, tried hard in recent months to work with patience and goodwill towards a better future. But this final act of the thousand-year-old House of Savoy must be seen as part of our national catastrophe; it is an expiation, an expiation forced upon all of us, even those who have not shared directly in the guilt of the dynasty."

Some monarchists advocated using force to prevent a republic from being proclaimed, even at the risk of a civil war, but Mack Smith wrote that: "Common sense and patriotism saved Umberto from accepting such counsel." Umberto rejected the advice that he should go to Naples, proclaim a rival government to start a civil war in which the Army would presumably side with the House of Savoy, under the grounds that "My House united Italy. I will not divide it". The monarchy of the House of Savoy formally ended on 12 June 1946. Prime Minister Alcide de Gasperi assumed office as Italy's interim Head of State. At about 3 pm on 13 June 1946, Umberto left the Quirinal Palace for the last time with the servants assembled in the courtyard to see him off, and many were in tears. At Ciampino Airport in Rome, as Umberto boarded the aeroplane that was to take him to Lisbon, a carabiniere grabbed him by the hand and said: "Your Majesty, we will never forget you!"

== In exile ==
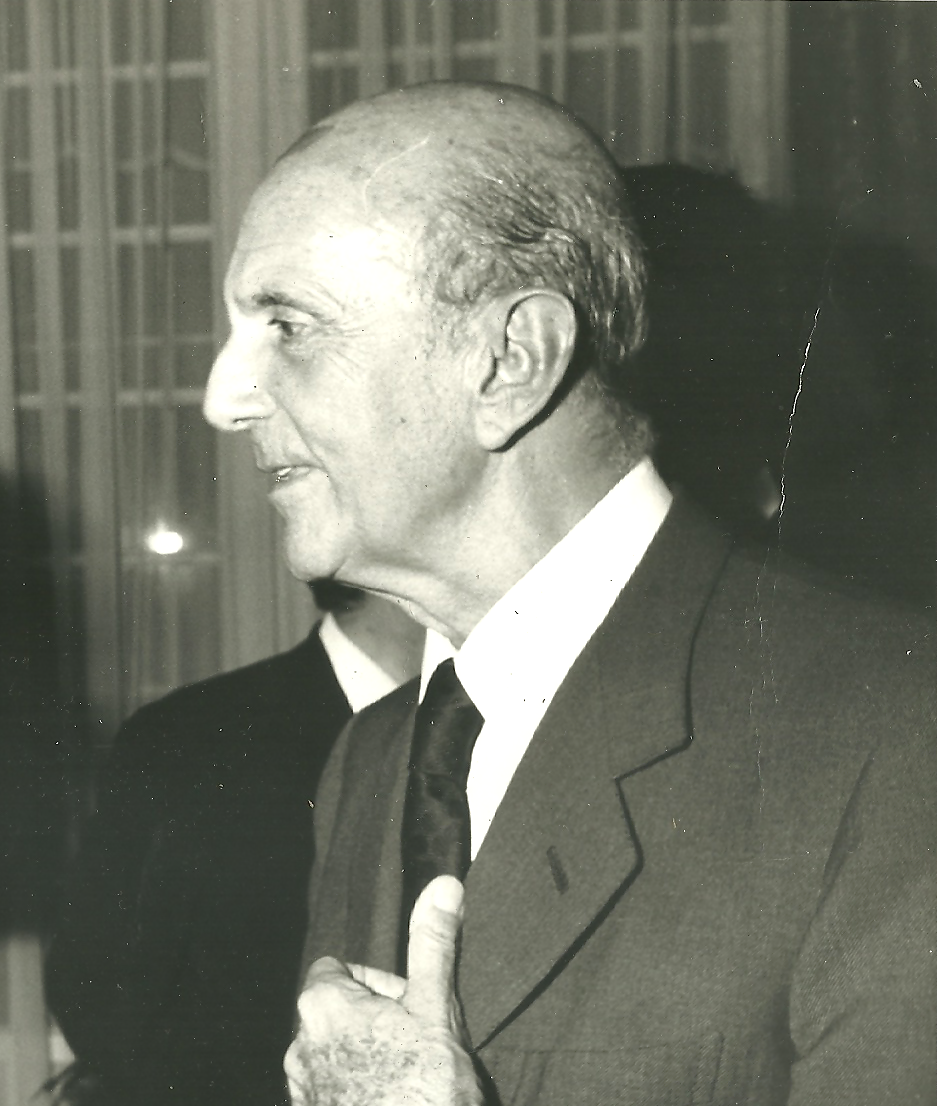
Umberto in 1982

Umberto II lived for 37 years in exile, in Cascais, on the Portuguese Riviera; the 1948 constitution of the Italian Republic not only forbade amending the constitution to restore the monarchy but, until 2002, barred all male heirs to the defunct Italian throne from returning to Italian soil. Female members of the Savoy family were not barred, except former queens consort.

Together with their four children, Umberto and Marie José took part in the ship tour organized by Queen Frederica and her husband King Paul of Greece in 1954, which became known as the "Cruise of the Kings" and was attended by over 100 royals from all over Europe. Since the ship tour began in Naples, the family could only board in Corfu, Greece, as they were not allowed to set foot on Italian soil. On this trip their daughter Princess Maria Pia met her future husband Prince Alexander of Yugoslavia.

Relations between Umberto and Marie José grew more strained during their exile, and their marriage broke up, with Marie José moving to Switzerland. At the same time, Umberto remained in Portugal, though, as devout Catholics, the couple did not divorce.

Umberto II died on 18 March 1983 in Geneva, Switzerland and was interred in Hautecombe Abbey, France, which for centuries was the burial place of the members of the House of Savoy.

== Titles, styles, honours, and arms ==
Styles of King Umberto II
- Reference style: His Majesty
- Spoken style: Your Majesty

=== Titles and styles ===
Umberto was granted the traditional title of Prince of Piedmont at birth. This was formalised by Royal Decree on 29 September 1904.

Umberto was granted the title of Umberto II, King of Italy on 9 May 1946.

=== Honours ===
==== National honours ====
- (Kingdom of Italy) House of Savoy:
  - Sovereign Knight of the Supreme Order of the Most Holy Annunciation, with Collar
  - Sovereign Knight Grand Cross of the Royal Order of Saints Maurice and Lazarus
  - Sovereign Knight Grand Cross of the Royal Order of the Crown
  - Sovereign Knight Grand Cross of the Royal Military Order of Savoy
  - Sovereign Knight Grand Cross of the Royal Civil Order of Savoy
  - Sovereign Knight Grand Cross of the Royal Order of the Star of Italy
  - Sovereign Knight of the Order of Merit for Labour
  - Sovereign Knight Grand Cross of the Order of the Roman Eagle
- Sovereign Military Order of Malta:
  - Bailiff Grand Cross of Justice, Special Class, 17 November 1922
  - Grand Cross of the Order of Merit, with Collar
- (Kingdom of the Two Sicilies) Two Sicilian Royal Family:
  - Knight of Saint Januarius, with Collar
  - Grand Cross of Justice of the Two Sicilian Royal Sacred Military Constantinian Order of Saint George, with Collar
- Tuscan Grand Ducal family:
  - Grand Cross of the Military Order of Saint Stephen
  - Grand Cross of Saint Joseph
- SS Principe Umberto, a passenger and cargo ship built in 1908, named after him, sunk in 1916.

==== Foreign honours ====
- Belgium: Grand Cordon of the Order of Leopold
- (Tsardom of Bulgaria (1908–1946)) Bulgarian Royal Family:
  - Knight of Saints Cyril and Methodius
  - Grand Cross of Saint Alexander, with Collar
- Denmark: Knight of the Elephant, 31 August 1922
- (German Empire) German Imperial and Royal Family: Knight of the Black Eagle, with Collar
  - (Kingdom of Bavaria) Bavarian Royal Family: Knight of Saint Hubert
  - (Grand Duchy of Hesse) Hessian Grand Ducal Family: Knight of the Golden Lion, with Collar
- (Greece) Greek Royal Family:
  - Grand Cross of the Redeemer
  - Grand Cross of Saints George and Constantine, with Collar
- Monaco: Grand Cross of St. Charles, 16 January 1930
- (Kingdom of Montenegro) Montenegrin Royal Family: Grand Cross of the Order of Prince Danilo I, Special Class
- Norway: Grand Cross of Saint Olav, with Collar, 19 August 1922
- Poland: Knight of the White Eagle
- (Kingdom of Portugal) Portuguese Royal Family:
  - Grand Cross of the Royal Military Order of Our Lord Jesus Christ
  - Grand Cross of the Tower and Sword, with Collar
- (Kingdom of Romania) Romanian Royal Family:
  - Grand Officer of the Order of Michael the Brave, 1st Class, 26 July 1943
  - Grand Cross of the Order of Carol I, with Collar
- (Russian Empire) Russian Imperial Family: Knight of Saint Andrew the Apostle the First-called, with Collar
  - (Georgia (country)) Georgian Royal Family: Grand Cross of the Eagle of Georgia
- Spain:
  - Knight of the Golden Fleece, 19 November 1923
  - Grand Cross of the Order of Charles III, with Collar, 7 June 1924
- Sweden: Knight of the Seraphim, 7 September 1922
- Thailand: Knight of the Order of the Royal House of Chakri, 26 March 1933
- United Kingdom: Recipient of the Royal Victorian Chain, 1935
- (Kingdom of Yugoslavia) Yugoslavian Royal Family: Grand Cross of the Star of Karađorđe
- Vatican: Grand Cross of the Holy Sepulchre of Jerusalem, with Collar
  - Holy See: Knight of the Supreme Order of Christ, with Collar, 2 January 1932

=== Coats of arms ===
Greater coat of arms of the King

Medium coat of arms

Medium coat of arms – variant

Lesser coat of arms

Arms as King as knight of the Spanish branch of the Order of the Golden Fleece and the Order of Charles III

Arms as King as knight of the Supreme Order of Christ

Coat of arms as Crown Prince

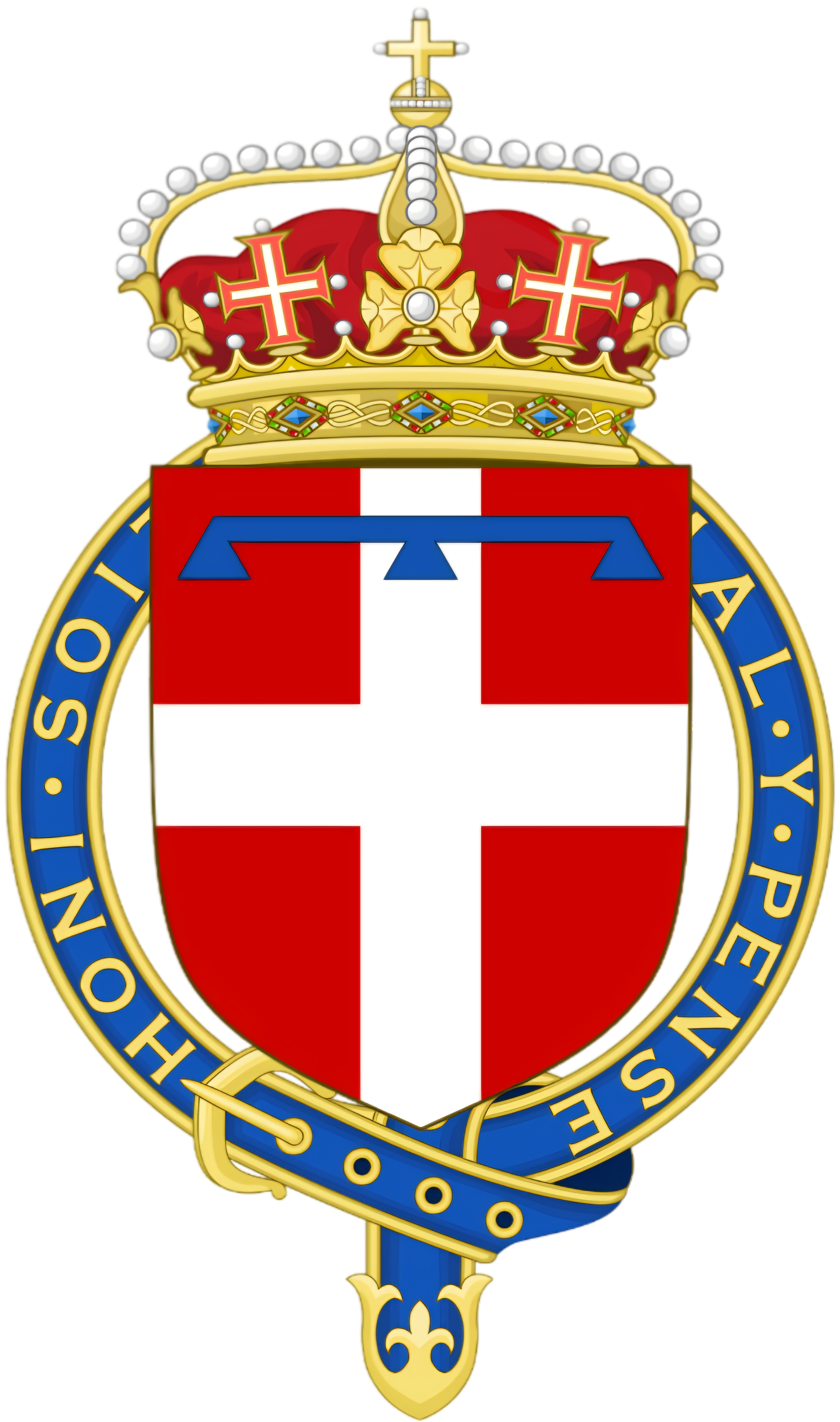
Arms as Crown Prince as Knight of the Most Noble Order of the Garter
(expelled in 1941)

Arms as Crown Prince as knight of the Order of the Seraphim

Arms as Crown Prince as knight of the Order of the Elephant Variant

== See also ==
- List of shortest reigning monarchs of all time

Umberto II of Italy House of Savoy Born: 15 September 1904 Died: 19 March 1983
Regnal titles
Preceded by Victor Emmanuel III	King of Italy; 9 May 1946 – 12 June 1946	Monarchy abolished Alcide De Gasperi as Provisional Head of State
Titles in pretence
Monarchy abolished	— TITULAR — King of Italy; 12 June 1946 – 18 March 1983; Reason for succession failure: monarchy abolished	Succeeded by Vittorio Emanuele or Amedeo
