= Princess Maria Gabriella of Savoy =

Italian princess (born 1940)

Princess Maria Gabriella
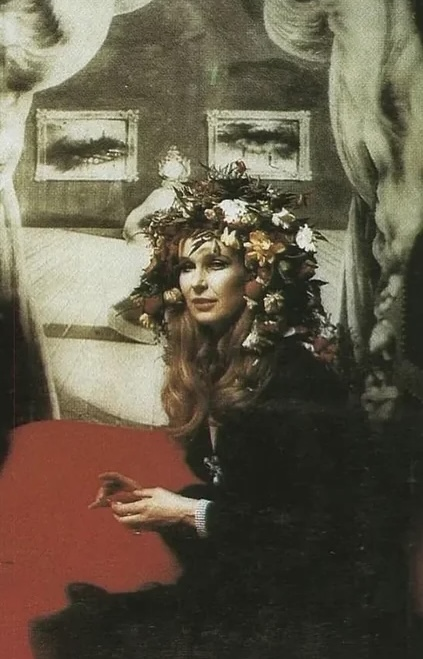
- Gabriella at Surrealist Ball of 1972
- Born: 24 February 1940 (age 86); Naples, Kingdom of Italy
- Spouse: Robert Zellinger de Balkany (m. 1969; div. 1990)
- Issue: Marie Elizabeth Zellinger de Balkany
Names
- Maria Gabriella Giuseppa Aldegonda Adelaide Ludovica Felicità Gennara di Savoia
- House: Savoy
- Father: Umberto II of Italy
- Mother: Marie-José of Belgium

Princess Maria Gabriella of Savoy (Born as: Maria Gabriella Giuseppa Aldegonda Adelaide Ludovica Felicita Gennara; 24 February 1940) is the middle daughter of the last King of Italy, Umberto II, and Marie-José of Belgium, the "May Queen". She is a historical writer.

== Life ==
Maria Gabriella di Savoia was the third child of the Prince and Princess of Piedmont, born in Naples, Italy in 1940. Her older siblings were Princess Maria Pia and Prince Vittorio Emanuele, while the younger was Princess Maria Beatrice. Her parents, married since 1930, were unhappy together, as her mother confessed in an interview many years later (On n'a jamais été heureux, "We were never happy"), and separated after the Italian monarchy was abolished following the 1946 referendum. To avoid capture by Nazi troops her mother had fled Italy to neutral Switzerland with Maria Gabriella and her siblings, where they took refuge from September 1943 until their return to Italy in 1945, by which time their father had become lieutenant-general of the kingdom for his father, King Victor Emmanuel III. Exiled after the fall of the monarchy, the family gathered briefly in Portugal, whence she, her sisters and brother soon returned with their mother to Switzerland, while their father remained in the Portuguese Riviera.

Maria Gabriella is a first cousin of the late King Baudouin of Belgium, former King Albert II of Belgium, the late Grand Duchess Joséphine-Charlotte of Luxembourg, Moritz, Landgrave of Hesse, and Tsar Simeon II of Bulgaria.

Educated in Switzerland, Maria Gabriella also took courses at a school associated with the Louvre in Paris. After her father's death, and with her brother's approval, she launched the King Umberto II Foundation in Lausanne, dedicated to preserving the history and legacy of the House of Savoy. She participated in numerous cultural presentations and organised an exhibit in Albertville during the 1992 Olympics. At the beginning of the 21st century she co-authored a number of books, mostly with Stefano Papi.

== Marriage and child ==
In the 1950s, Mohammad Reza Pahlavi, Shah of Iran, then divorced from his second wife, indicated his interest in marrying Princess Maria Gabriella. Pope John XXIII reportedly vetoed the suggestion. In an editorial about the rumors surrounding the marriage of "a Muslim sovereign and a Catholic princess", the Vatican newspaper, L'Osservatore Romano, wrote that the match constituted "a grave danger."

She married Robert Zellinger de Balkany (4 August 1931 in Iclod, Romania – 19 September 2015 in Geneva, Switzerland) on 12 February 1969 in Sainte-Mesme. The religious wedding was celebrated later on 21 June 1969 at Eze-sur-Mer, at Château Balsan. The couple separated in 1976 and divorced in November 1990. They had one daughter.

== Patronages ==
- President of Humberto II Foundation (Lausanne).
- Honorary Member of Rotary Club (Cuneo).

== Published works ==
- Casa Savoia. Diario di una monarchia (2001, Mondadori Electa), co-written with Romano Brancalini.
- Gioielli di Casa Savoia (2002, Mondadori Electa), co-written with Stefano Papi.
- Vita di corte in casa Savoia (2005, Mondadori Electa), co-written with Stefano Papi. ISBN 978-8837024130
- Jewellery of the House of Savoy (2007, Mondadori Electa), co-written with Stefano Papi. ISBN 978-8837052409 (expanded English edition of Gioielli di Casa Savoia)
