= Princess Maria Beatrice of Savoy =

Princess of Savoy

Princess Maria Beatrice
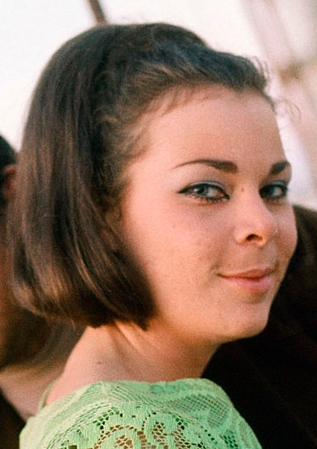
- Maria Beatrice of Savoy, in 1967
- Born: 2 February 1943 (age 83); Quirinal Palace, Rome, Kingdom of Italy
- Spouse: Luis Rafael Reyna-Corvalán y Dillon (m. 1970; div. 1998)
- Issue: Rafael Reyna-Corvalán y de Saboya; Patrizio Reyna-Corvalán y de Saboya; Azaea Reyna-Corvalán y de Saboya
Names
- Maria Beatrice Elena Margherita Ludovica Caterina Ramona
- House: Savoy
- Father: Umberto II of Italy
- Mother: Marie-José of Belgium

Princess Maria Beatrice of Savoy (born 2 February 1943) is the youngest daughter of the last King of Italy, Umberto II, and his wife, Queen Marie-José.

== Life ==
Born Principessa Maria Beatrice Elena Margherita Ludovica Caterina Romana di Savoia, she was the third daughter as well as the fourth and last child of the Prince and Princess of Piedmont, known as "Titi" to family and friends. When she was three years old, her father ruled Italy as Umberto II for slightly over a month, from 9 May 1946 to 12 June 1946. The family was then exiled and briefly gathered in Portugal, where her parents decided to separate. She and her siblings went with their mother to Switzerland while their father remained in the Portuguese Riviera.

Maria Beatrice is a first cousin of King Baudouin of Belgium, King Albert II of Belgium, Grand Duchess Joséphine-Charlotte of Luxembourg, Moritz, Landgrave of Hesse, and Tsar Simeon II of Bulgaria.

== Marriage and children ==
Princess Maria Beatrice attempted to marry Italian actor Maurizio Arena in 1967 but was prevented by her family, who filed a lawsuit claiming that she was mentally unfit to marry. The lawsuit was dropped in early 1968 when the relationship ended.

Titi married Luis Rafael Reyna-Corvalán y Dillon (born 18 April 1939 in Córdoba, Argentina – died 17 February 1999 in Cuernavaca, Mexico), son of Cesar Augusto Reyna-Corvalán and Amalia Maria Dillon Calvo, on 1 April 1970 in Ciudad Juarez, Mexico. They were also married in a religious ceremony in January 1971 in Córdoba, Argentina. They separated in 1995 and were divorced in 1998.

The couple had three children.

For some time, her mother lived with her and her children in Mexico.

Her eldest son died, aged 23, on 29 April 1994 in Boston, Massachusetts, falling from the terrace of the building where he lived.

Her ex-husband was murdered on 17 February 1999 in Cuernavaca, Mexico. The Princess did not attend his funeral.

== See also ==
- List of people from Morelos
- Acapantzingo, Cuernavaca
