= Jaehyuck Choi =

South Korean composer and conductor of classical music

- Hangul: 최재혁
- RR: Choe Jaehyeok
- MR: Ch'oe Chaehyŏk

Jaehyuck Choi (born October 31, 1994) is a South Korean composer and conductor of classical music, based in New York and Seoul.

== Education ==
He studied composition with Samuel Adler and Matthias Pintscher at The Juilliard School. He also studied with Unsuk Chin in the master class series held by the Seoul Philharmonic Orchestra. He attended various summer festivals and workshops including: Tanglewood BUTI, Yellow Barn, Mozarteum Sommer Akademie, Fontainebleau Summer Academy, Grafenegg Festival, and Seoul Philharmonic's Master Class Series, with Pacal Dusapin, Péter Eötvös, Tristan Murail, York Höller, and Unsuk Chin.

== Professional accomplishments ==
As a conductor, Choi pursued diplomas from Royaumont Foundation's "Cours de Chef" with Jean-Pihillippe Wurtz, Péter Eötvös, and Ensemble Linea, as well as IRCAM Manifeste's Ensemble conducting program with Péter Eötvös, Ensemble InterContemporain, and the Lucerne Festival Academy Ensemble, in Paris. Choi attended Grafenegg Festival's "INK STILL WET" program as a both composer and conductor under the director of Matthias Pintscher with the Tonkünstler-Orchesters Niederösterreich.

He was commissioned to write an a cappella piece for The New York Virtuoso Singers with Harold Rosenbaum, Violin Concerto for Gwacheon Symphony Orchestra with Jae Won Yoo, an ensemble piece for Opening 15 Internationales Festival fűr Aktuelle Klangkunst in Trier, Germany, for Ensemble Crush and a String Quartet for Yieum Ensemble.

== Influences ==
Jaehyuck Choi does not regard his music as belonging to any specific culture. Choi names Ludwig van Beethoven, Pierre Boulez, Karlheinz Stockhausen, Iannis Xenakis, Morton Feldman, Salvatore Sciarrino, and Beat Furrer among others, as 19th, 20th, 21st-century composers of special importance for him. Choi regards the works of Lee Ufan as influencing him. His Self Portrait series, which consists of six works, is the music heard from his contemplation on Lee's Relatum series.

=== Orchestral ===
- Self-Portrait VI for orchestra (2015)

=== Concertante ===
- Violin Concerto (2014)
- Small Cello Concerto (2012)

=== Ensemble ===
- Self-Portrait V for String Quartet (2015)
- Self-Portrait IV for Flute (dbl. Bass Flute), Piano, Percussion, Violin and Violoncello (2014)
- Self-Portrait III for Violoncello and Piano (2013)
- Self-Portrait II for Alto Flute, Percussion and Violoncello (2013)
- Self-Portrait I for two Violoncelli (2012~2013)
- Silent Chaos for Flute, Bassoon, Piano, Percussion, Violin, and Violoncello (2013)
- Sonata for Violin and Piano (2013)
- String Quartet (2012)
- Sonata for Violoncello and Piano in E minor (2009)

=== Piano ===
- Piano Etude No. 1 (2012)
- Piano Etude No. 2 (2014)

=== Solo works ===
- Substance of Time for solo violoncello (2014)
- Viola Caprice (2013)
- Self in Mind for solo violin (2018)

=== Vocal ===
- Memorandum on a Line no. 2 for 4 Sopranos, and 4 Altos (2015)

== Recognition ==
He won the SCI Young Composers Award (2015), Morton Gould Award (2013, 2015), MTNA Composition Competition (2013), National YoungArts Foundation (2013), Pikes Peak International Young Composers Competition (2012), Daegu International Contemporary Music Festival (2013) and TIMF call for score (2013). In 2016 spring, his Violin Concerto was to be released as a CD and Digital mp3 by Ablaze Records, and Piano Etude no.2 by the SAMADIS'.
