= Sarre, Aosta Valley =

Sarre Saro (Valdôtain) Soare (Walser)
- Comune
- Comune di Sarre; Commune de Sarre
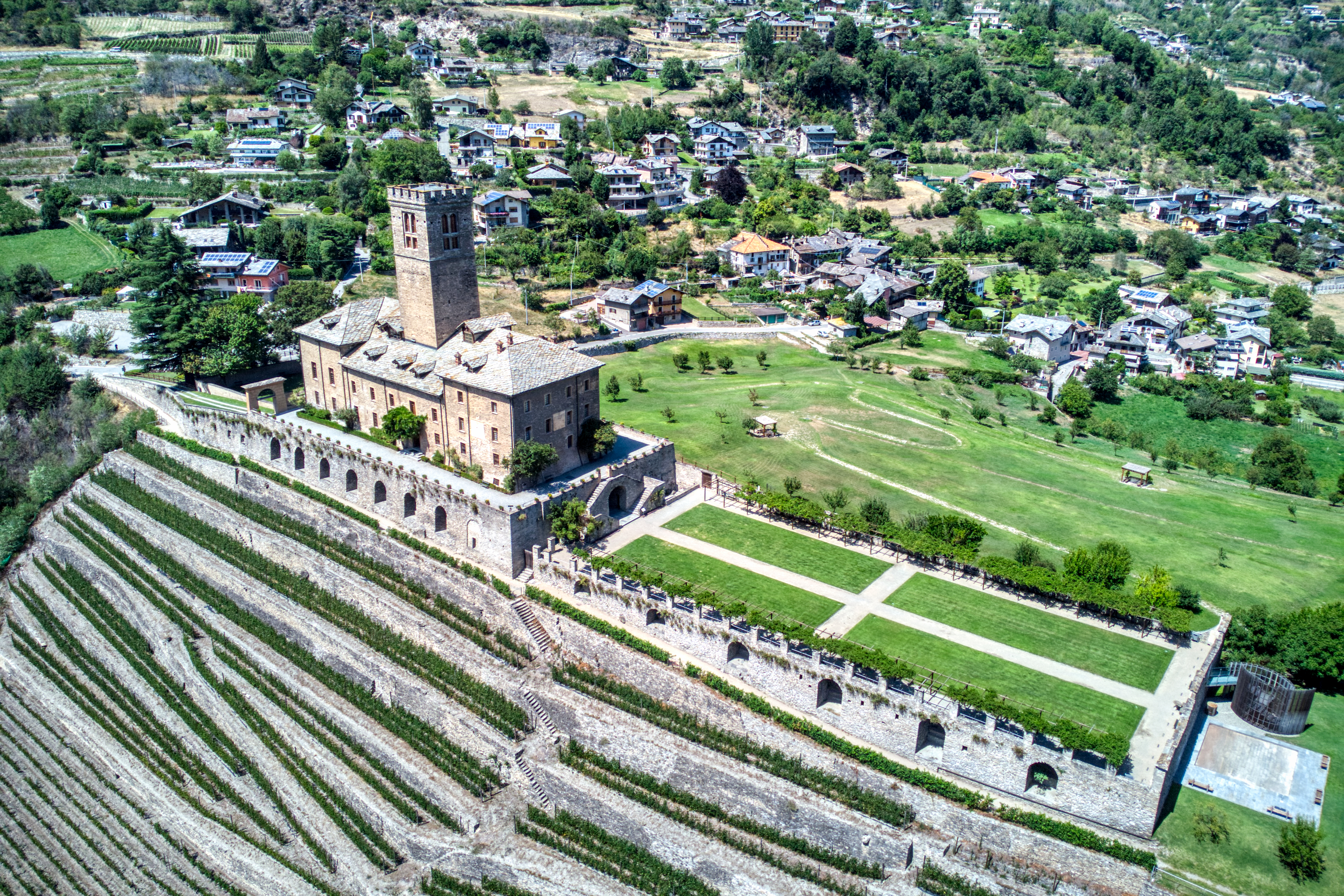
- The royal castle.

- Coat of arms

- Location within Italy Location within Aosta Valley
- Coordinates: 45°43′4.10″N 7°15′27″E
- Country: Italy
- Region: Aosta Valley
- Province: none
- Frazioni: Arensod, Bellair, Bellun, Blassinod, Charbonnière, Clut, Crou-Pernet, Fachet, Fochat, Grand-Cré, Janin, La Fontaine, La Gorettaz, Lalex, Maillod, Moulin, Pertusat, Petit-Cré, Rovine, Sainte-Hélène, Saint-Maurice, Thouraz, Tissoret, Vareille, Vert, Angelin, Baravod, Bétende, Beuvé, Challançon, Champlan, Clou, Conclonaz, Condemine, Creutzet, Fareur, La Grenade, Lalaz, La Remise, Mondache, Montan, Oveillan, Palue, Péravère, Piolet, Pléod, Poinsod, Pont d'Avisod, Rigollet, Ronc, Rovarey, Salée, Tissière, Caillod, La Cort, Lein, Moulin, Remondet

Area
  - Total: 28 km^{2} (11 sq mi)
- Elevation: 631 m (2,070 ft)

Population (31 December 2022)
  - Total: 4,821
  - Density: 170/km^{2} (450/sq mi)
- Demonym: Sarrois or Sarroleins
- Time zone: UTC+1 (CET)
  - Summer (DST): UTC+2 (CEST)
- Postal code: 11010
- Dialing code: 0165
- ISTAT code: 7066
- Patron saint: Saint Maurice
- Saint day: 22 September
- Website: Official website

Sarre (French: [saʁ]; Valdôtain: Saro; Issime Walser: Soaru) is a town and comune in the Aosta Valley region of north-western Italy.

Main sights include Sarre Castle.

== Twin towns — sister cities ==
Sarre is twinned with:

- La Turbie, France

== Notable people ==
=== Sport ===
- René-Laurent Vuillermoz (born 1977), retired Olympic biathlete
