= Prince Viggo, Count of Rosenborg =

Danish prince (1893–1970)

Prince Viggo
- Count of Rosenborg
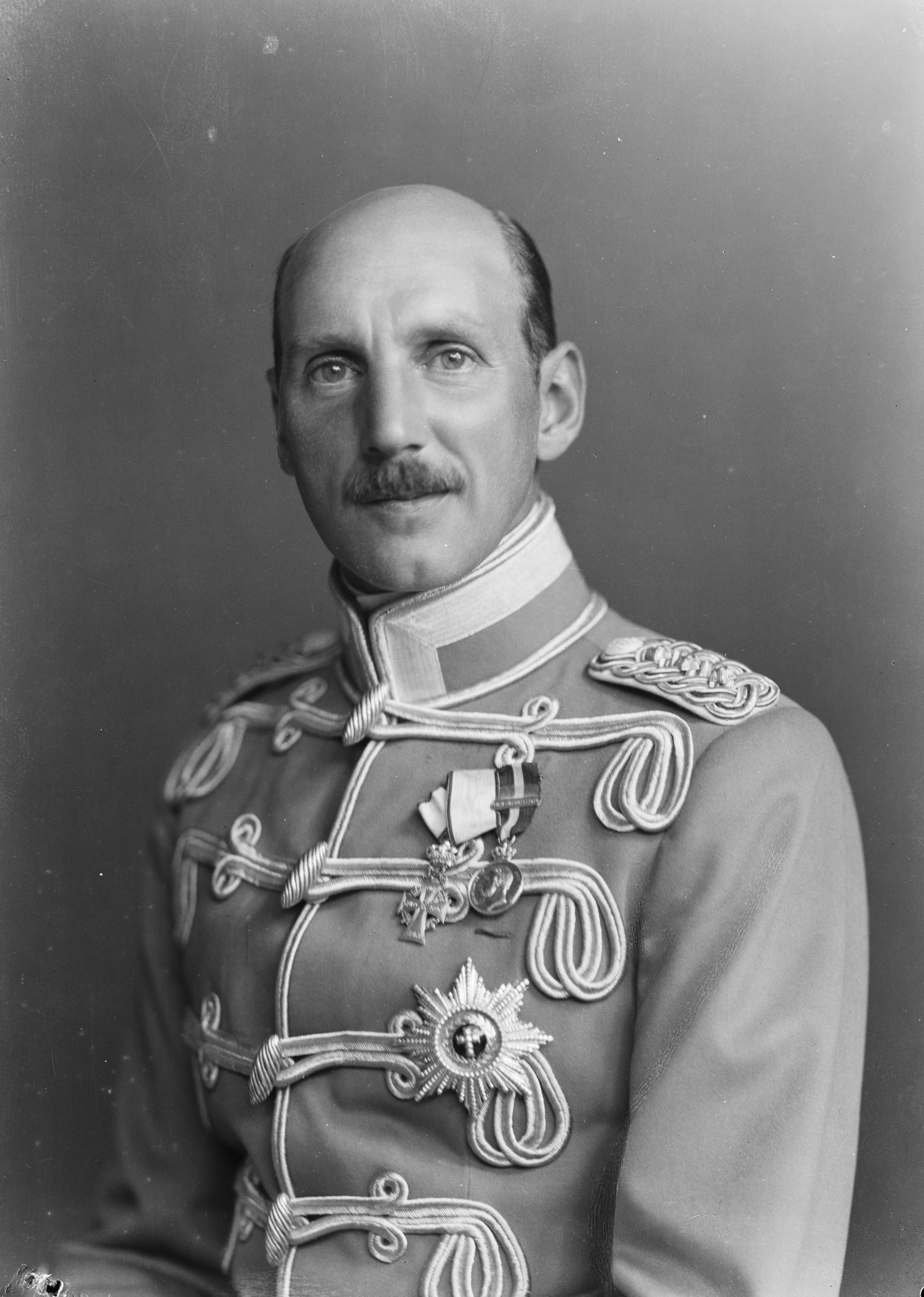
- Born: 25 December 1893; Copenhagen, Denmark
- Died: 4 January 1970 (aged 76); Ebeltoft, Denmark
- Burial: Roskilde Cathedral
- Spouse: Eleanor Margaret Green (m. 1924; died 1966)
Names
- Viggo Christian Adolf Georg
- House: Glücksburg
- Father: Prince Valdemar of Denmark
- Mother: Princess Marie of Orléans

Prince Viggo, Count of Rosenborg (Viggo Christian Adolf Georg; 25 December 1893 – 4 January 1970) was a Danish prince. He was born in Copenhagen the youngest son of Prince Valdemar of Denmark and Princess Marie of Orléans. He was also the youngest grandson of Christian IX of Denmark.

== Biography ==
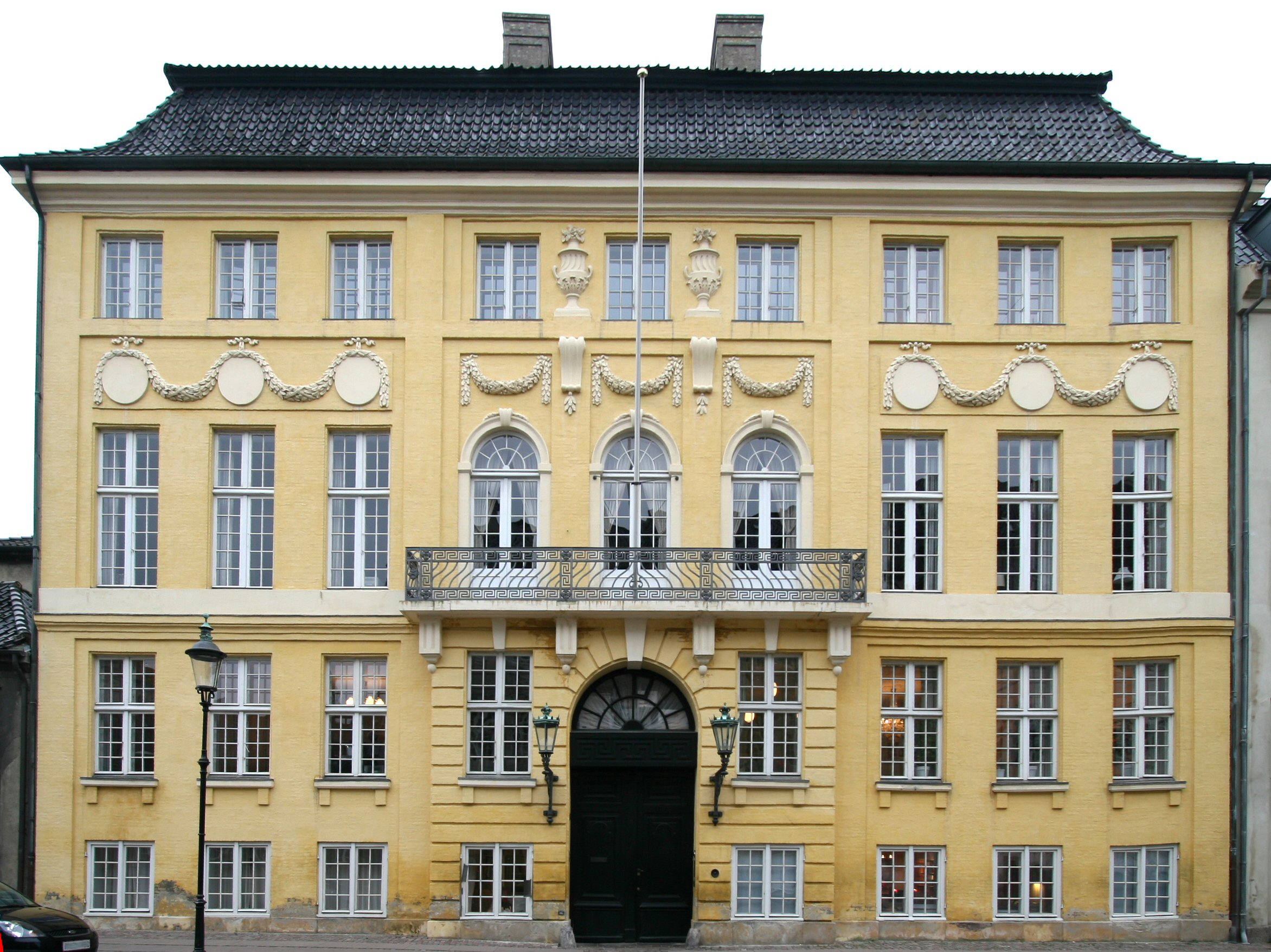
The Yellow Palace, Copenhagen: Prince Viggo's childhood home

Prince Viggo was born on 25 December 1893, in the Yellow Palace, an 18th-century town house at 18 Amaliegade, immediately adjacent to the Amalienborg Palace complex in Copenhagen. He was the fourth child of Prince Valdemar of Denmark, and his wife Princess Marie of Orléans. His father was a younger son of King Christian IX of Denmark and Louise of Hesse-Kassel, and his mother was the eldest daughter of Prince Robert, Duke of Chartres and Princess Françoise of Orléans. His parents' marriage was said to be a political match.

He was christened on 24 February 1894 and his godparents were: King Christian IX and Queen Louise of Denmark (his paternal grandparents); Prince Christian of Denmark (his paternal first cousin); Prince George of Greece and Denmark (his paternal first cousin); Grand Duke Adolphe and Grand Duchess Adelheid-Marie of Luxembourg; Anna, Landgravine of Hesse; and Princess Marie of Anhalt. He was an Officer.

Without the legally required permission of the Danish king for a dynastic marriage, Viggo married Eleanor Margaret Green (New York City, 5 November 1895 – Copenhagen, 3 July 1966), in New York City on 10 June 1924.

As became customary in the Danish royal house upon marriage to a commoner, prior to the wedding Viggo renounced his place in Denmark's line of succession to the Crown, forfeiting his title of Prince of Denmark, and his style of Royal Highness. With the king's authorisation, he assumed the title "Prince Viggo, Greve af (Count of) Rosenborg" and the style of Highness on 21 December 1923. Although the comital title was made hereditary for all of his legitimate descendants in the male line, the princely title was restricted to himself and his wife alone (i.e. "Prince and Princess Viggo", etc.). The couple had no children. They took part in the ship tour organized by King Paul of Greece and Queen Frederica in 1954, which became known as the "Cruise of the Kings" and was attended by over 100 royals from all over Europe.

Prince Viggo died in Ebeltoft in 1970. He was the last surviving grandson of Christian IX.

== Honours ==
Prince Viggo received the following orders and decorations:

- Denmark:
  - R.E.: Knight of the Order of the Elephant, 25 December 1911
  - D.M.: Cross of Honour of the Order of the Dannebrog, 25 December 1911
  - S.K.: Grand Cross of the Order of the Dannebrog, 28 January 1954
  - Gb.E.T.: King Christian IX and Queen Louise of Denmark Golden Wedding Commemorative Medal
  - M.M. 8 Apr.: King Christian IX Centenary Medal
  - Ht.H: Army Long Service Medal
  - R.O.Ht.: Badge of Honor of the Reserve Officers Association of Denmark
- Ethiopian Empire: Grand Cross of the Order of the Holy Trinity
- Finland: Grand Cross with Collar of the Order of the White Rose
- France: Grand Cross of the Legion of Honour
- Kingdom of Greece: Grand Cross of the Order of the Redeemer
- Kingdom of Italy: Grand Cross of the Order of Saints Maurice and Lazarus
- Netherlands: Grand Cross of the House Order of Orange
- Norway: Grand Cross of the Royal Norwegian Order of St. Olav, with Collar, 25 June 1926
- Sweden: Knight of the Order of the Seraphim

== Ancestors ==
Ancestors of Prince Viggo, Count of Rosenborg

16. Friedrich Karl Ludwig, Duke of Schleswig-Holstein-Sonderburg-Beck
8. Friedrich Wilhelm, Duke of Schleswig-Holstein-Sonderburg-Glücksburg
17. Countess Friederike of Schlieben
4. Christian IX of Denmark
18. Prince Charles of Hesse-Kassel
9. Princess Louise Caroline of Hesse-Kassel
19. Princess Louise of Denmark
2. Prince Valdemar of Denmark
20. Prince Frederick of Hesse-Kassel
10. Prince William of Hesse-Kassel
21. Princess Caroline of Nassau-Usingen
5. Princess Louise of Hesse-Kassel
22. Frederick, Hereditary Prince of Denmark
11. Princess Charlotte of Denmark
23. Duchess Sophia Frederica of Mecklenburg-Schwerin
1. Prince Viggo of Denmark
24. Louis Philippe I of France
12. Prince Ferdinand Philippe, Duke of Orléans
25. Princess Maria Amalia of Naples and Sicily
6. Prince Robert, Duke of Chartres
26. Frederick Louis, Hereditary Grand Duke of Mecklenburg-Schwerin
13. Duchess Helene of Mecklenburg-Schwerin
27. Princess Karoline Luise of Saxe-Weimar-Eisenach
3. Princess Marie of Orléans
28. Louis Philippe I of France (= 24)
14. François, Prince of Joinville
29. Princess Maria Amalia of Naples and Sicily (= 25)
7. Princess Françoise of Orléans
30. Pedro I of Brazil
15. Princess Francisca of Brazil
31. Archduchess Leopoldina of Austria
