= Prince Erik, Count of Rosenborg =

Prince Erik
- Count of Rosenborg
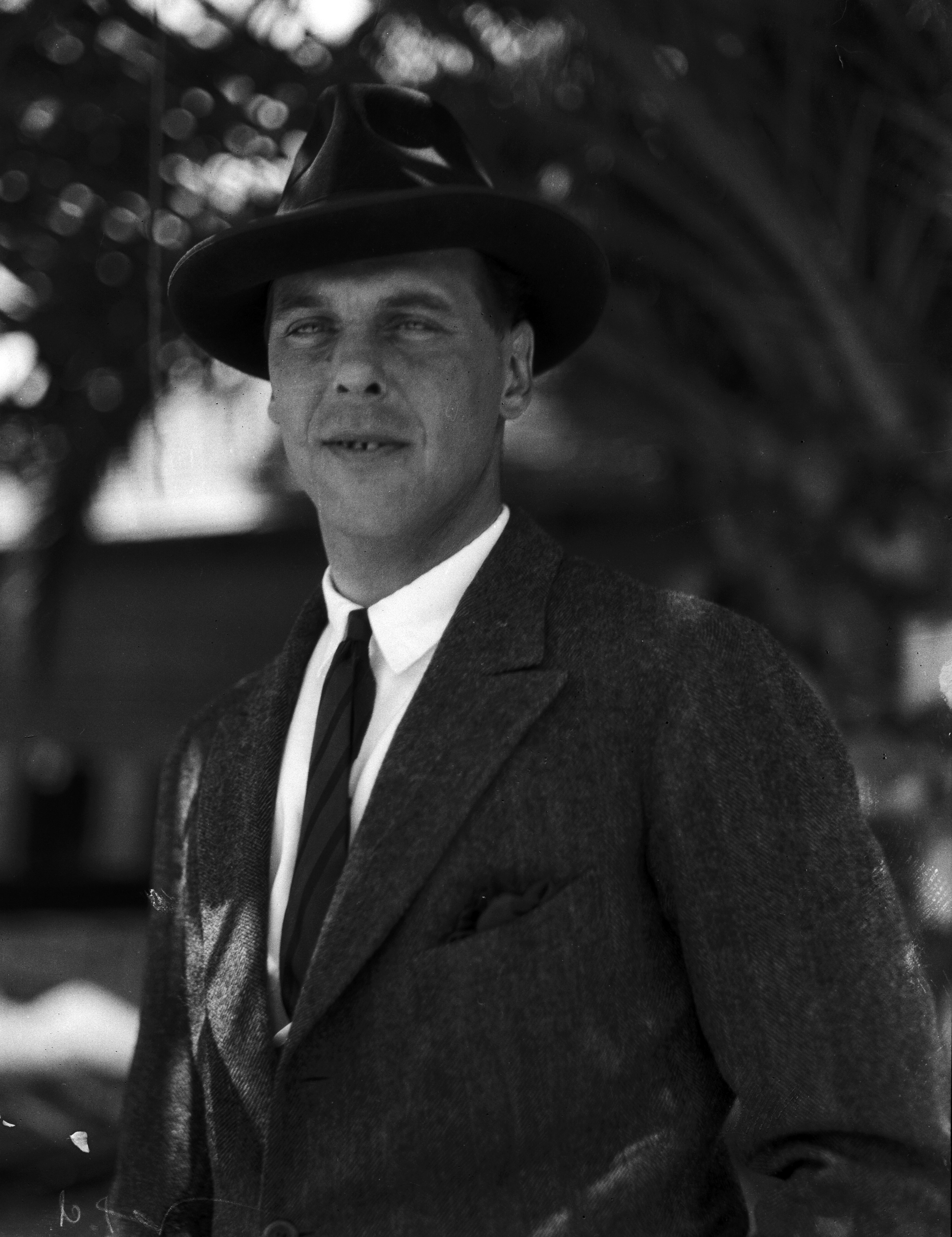
- Prince Erik in 1924
- Born: 8 November 1890; Copenhagen, Denmark
- Died: 10 September 1950 (aged 59); Copenhagen, Denmark
- Spouse: Lois Frances Booth (m. 1924; div. 1937)
- Issue: Countess Alexandra; Count Christian
Names
- Erik Frederik Christian Alexander
- House: Glücksburg
- Father: Prince Valdemar of Denmark
- Mother: Princess Marie of Orléans

Prince Erik, Count of Rosenborg (Erik Frederik Christian Alexander zu Schleswig-Holstein-Sonderburg-Glücksburg; 8 November 1890 – 10 September 1950) was a Danish royal family member. He was born at Copenhagen, the 3rd son of Prince Valdemar of Denmark and Princess Marie of Orléans.

== Early life ==
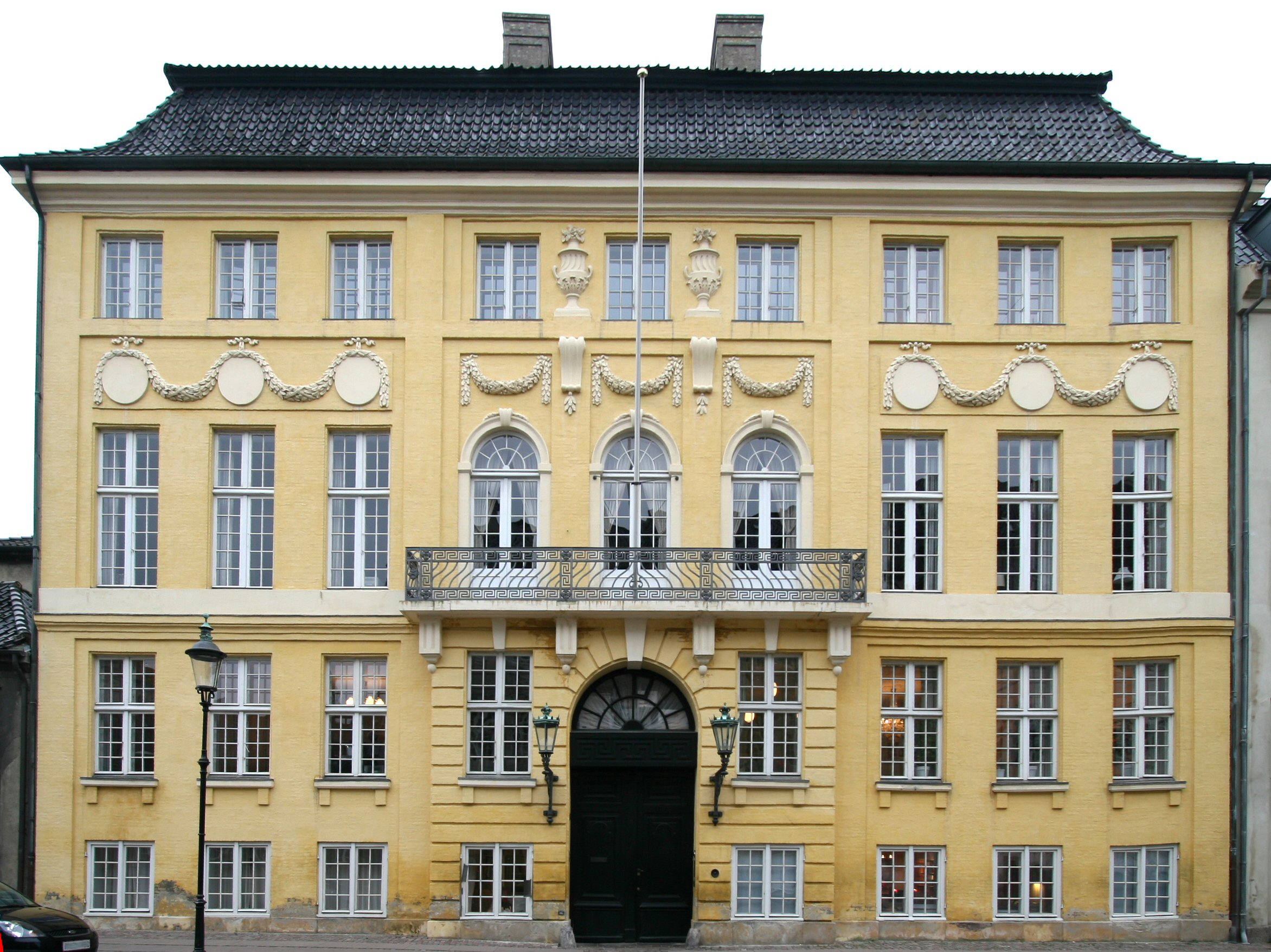
Yellow Palace, Copenhagen: Prince Erik's childhood home

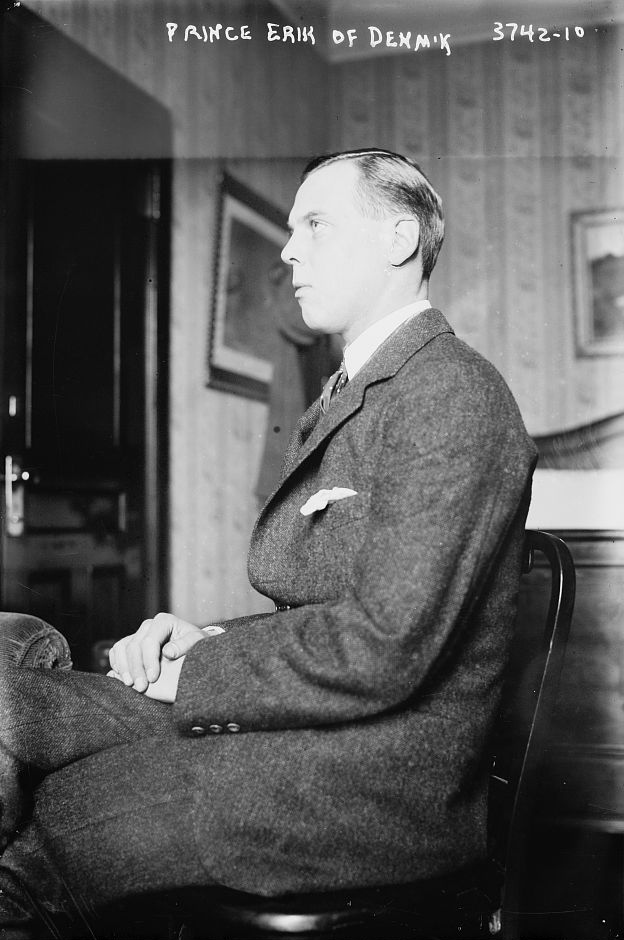
Prince Erik of Denmark in 1916

Prince Erik was born on 8 November 1890, in the Yellow Palace, an 18th-century town house at 18 Amaliegade, immediately adjacent to the Amalienborg Palace in Copenhagen. The third child of Prince Valdemar of Denmark and his wife Princess Marie of Orléans. His father was a younger son of King Christian IX of Denmark and Louise of Hesse-Kassel, and his mother was the eldest daughter of Prince Robert, Duke of Chartres and Princess Françoise of Orléans. His parents' marriage was reputed to be a political match.

Prince Erik was christened 10 days after his birth and his godparents were his paternal grandparents, King Christian IX and Queen Louise of Denmark; his paternal uncle and aunt, Tsar Alexander III of Russia and Empress Maria Feodorovna; and his paternal uncle and aunt, Crown Prince Frederik and Crown Princess Louise of Denmark.

Later created Count of Rosenborg, Erik inherited the family estates.

Marital arms of the Count and Countess of Rosenborg

== Marriage and issue ==
As was then customary with Danish royalty, Erik renounced his rights to the throne when he chose to take a commoner as wife, marrying in Ottawa, Ontario, on 11 February 1924 Lois Frances Booth (Ottawa, Ontario, 2 August 1897 – Copenhagen, 26 February 1941). His wife was the daughter of a kinsman of the Booth baronets, John Frederick Booth (Ontario, 3 June 1865 – Ontario, 5 August 1930), who lived in Canada, and wife Frances Alberta Hunsicker (Montreal, Quebec, 1 November 1866 – Victoria, British Columbia, 12 February 1964, buried in Beechwood Cemetery, Ottawa), and paternal granddaughter of John Rudolphus Booth, the Father of Canada by his wife Rosalinda Cooke (1829 – 1886). Prince Erik and his wife divorced in 1937. Lois Countess of Rosenborg married secondly Gunnar Thorkild Juelsberg (1904 – 1966), by whom she had no issue.

Erik and Lois had two children:

- Countess Alexandra Dagmar Frances Marie Margrethe of Rosenborg (Arcadia, California, 5 February 1927 – Odense, 5 October 1992), feudal baron of Sanderumgaard Gods and Fraugde, married in Sankt Jacobs Kirke, Copenhagen, on 2 May 1951 to Ivar Emil |Vind-Röj, Tesdorpfske Fideikommis (feudal baron) of Sanderumgaard and Bækkeskov (Everdrup, 5 January 1921 – Odense, 11 February 1977), Royal Chamberlain, Master of the Court Hunt, son of Ove Holger Christian Vind, feudal baron of Sanderumgaard and Bækkeskov (29 July 1877 – 10 February 1954), Royal Chamberlain, Master of the Court Hunt, Second Lieutenant in the Royal Danish Army, Assistant Minister of Foreign Affairs, feudal baron of Sanderumgaard Gods and Fraugde, by his wife, Elsa Mimi Adelaide Marie Oxholm (Copenhagen, 5 December 1891 – 4 March 1970), inscribed with a memorial tablet in Vallø Noble Diocese in Bækkeskov Gods, Tappernøje, Rønnede
  - Marie-Louise Frances Elisabeth Vind (b. Hellerup, 7 February 1952), married in Allerup Kirke on 7 April 1973 (later divorced) Count Christian Gustav Knuth af Christiansdal (Stenagergaard Gods, Mesinge, 23 November 1942 – 8 August 2010), feudal baron of Lilliendal Gods, Mern, son of Count Ulrik Gustav Adam Knuth (Østergaard Gods, Mern, 27 January 1911 – 13 January 2004), Royal Chamberlain, Court Huntsman, feudal baron of Lilliendal Gods and Mern, by his wife (m. Rønninge Kirke, Fakse, 12 July 1940) Baroness Tove Birgitte Bille-Brahe-Selby (Frederiksberg, 23 October 1915 – Mern, 19 August 2002), and had two children:
    - Countess Christina Elisabeth Knuth af Christiansdal (b. Nykøbing Falster, 6 May 1977), married in 2005 to Jacob Conrad Kamman (b. 1979)
    - Count Michael Ivar Knuth af Christiansdal (b. Nykøbing Falster, 8 December 1979)
  - Erik Ove Carl John Emil Vind (b. Hellerup, 5 May 1954), married in Mahé, Seychelles, on 15 February 1993 Countess Suzanne Ingrid Jessie Dorthe Ahlefeldt-Laurvig-Bille (b. Svendborg, 4 March 1967), lady-in-waiting to Princess Alexandra, sister of Count Michael Preben Ahlefeldt-Laurvig-Bille and daughter of Count Claus Christian Ahlefeldt-Laurvig-Bille (Copenhagen, 6 March 1932 – 2014), feudal baron of Havnø Gods, Hadsund, and second wife and third cousin (m. Tranekær Kirke, 21 September 1963, divorced in 1971) Countess Merete-Anette Ahlefeldt-Laurvig (b. Rudkøbing, 1 April 1943), nurse
    - Rosemarie Alexandra Kirsten Vind (b. Copenhagen, 2 November 1993), fashion model
    - Georg Ivar Emil Vind (b. Copenhagen, 15 October 1995)
    - Nonni Margaretha Elsa Vind (b. Odense, 14 June 2003)
  - Georg Christian Valdemar Vind (b. Hellerup, 5 August 1958), married in Kuwait City on 19 September 1993 to Maria Munk (b. Frederiksberg, Copenhagen, 12 October 1966), distant cousin of Jacob Munch, Peter Andreas Munch and Edvard Munch
    - Andreas Ivar Knud Holger Vind (b. Kuwait, 26 November 1994)
    - Clara Alexandra Vind (b. 8 January 1998), journalist at Ekstra Bladet, B.T. and Berlingske
- Count Christian Edward Valdemar Jean Frederik Peter of Rosenborg (Bjergbygaard, 16 July 1932 – London, 24 March 1997), Major in the Royal Danish Army; married at Stouby Kirke on 10 August 1962 Karin von Lüttichau (b. Stouby Gods, 12 August 1938), lady-in-waiting to Princess Benedikte of Denmark in Stensballe, Horsens, (married secondly to Michael Warberg), daughter of Folmer von Lüttichau (Hindsgavl Gods, Middelfart, 12 August 1898 – 14 February 1977), Court Huntmaster, feudal baron of Daugaard, and wife (m. Bregnet Kirke, 23 March 1934) Ingeborg Marie Saima Carl (of Danish nobility) (Copenhagen, 20 October 1915 – 12 September 1983)
  - Count Valdemar Erik Flemming Christian of Rosenborg (b. Skovshoved, 9 July 1965), Lieutenant in the Guard Hussar Regiment, director of Maersk Broker, married on 29 June 1996 (divorced 2005) Charlotte Diane Isabelle Cruse (b. Cognac, 23 April 1967), daughter of Roland Cruse and wife Annette Ingemann, paternal granddaughter of Emmanuel Henri Georges Cruse (1892 – 1968) and wife and cousin Marguerite de Luze, daughter of Alfred de Luze and wife Sophie Cruse, great-granddaughter of Victor Adolphe Frédéric Cruse (1854 – 1933) and wife (m. 1880) Lucie Louise Amélie Durand-Dassier (1860 – 1923), and great-great-granddaughter of Jean-Christian Herman Cruse (1820 – 1877), son of Hans Wilhelm Herman Cruse and wife Anna Rebecka Emma Raake, and wife (m. 1848) Suzanne Sophie Lawton (1827 – 1916), daughter of Henry Lawton (1799 – 1828) and wife (m. 1823) Henriette Balguerie de Chautard, paternal granddaughter of Guillaume Lawton (1755 – 1835) and wife (m. 1790) Marie de Raynaud (1771 – 1819), and great-granddaughter of Abraham Lawton (1716 – 1776) and wife (m. 1746) Charlotte de Selve
    - Count Nicolai Christian Valdemar of Rosenborg (b. Gentofte, 6 November 1997)
    - Countess Marie Geraldine Charlotte of Rosenborg (b. Copenhagen, 7 May 1999)
  - Countess Marina Isabelle Ingeborg Karin of Rosenborg (b. Skovshoved, 28 March 1971).

Count Erik died on 10 September 1950 at Copenhagen, Denmark.

== See also ==
- Counts of Rosenborg
- Danish nobility
- Johanniterorden

== Ancestors ==
Ancestors of Prince Erik, Count of Rosenborg

8. Friedrich Wilhelm, Duke of Schleswig-Holstein-Sonderburg-Glücksburg
4. Christian IX of Denmark
9. Princess Louise Caroline of Hesse-Kassel
2. Prince Valdemar of Denmark
10. Prince William of Hesse-Kassel
5. Princess Louise of Hesse-Kassel
11. Princess Charlotte of Denmark
1. Prince Erik of Denmark
12. Prince Ferdinand, Duke of Orléans
6. Prince Robert, Duke of Chartres
13. Duchess Helene of Mecklenburg-Schwerin
3. Princess Marie of Orléans
14. François, Prince of Joinville
7. Princess Françoise of Orléans
15. Princess Francisca of Brazil
