= Prince Axel of Denmark =

Danish prince (1888–1964)

Prince Axel
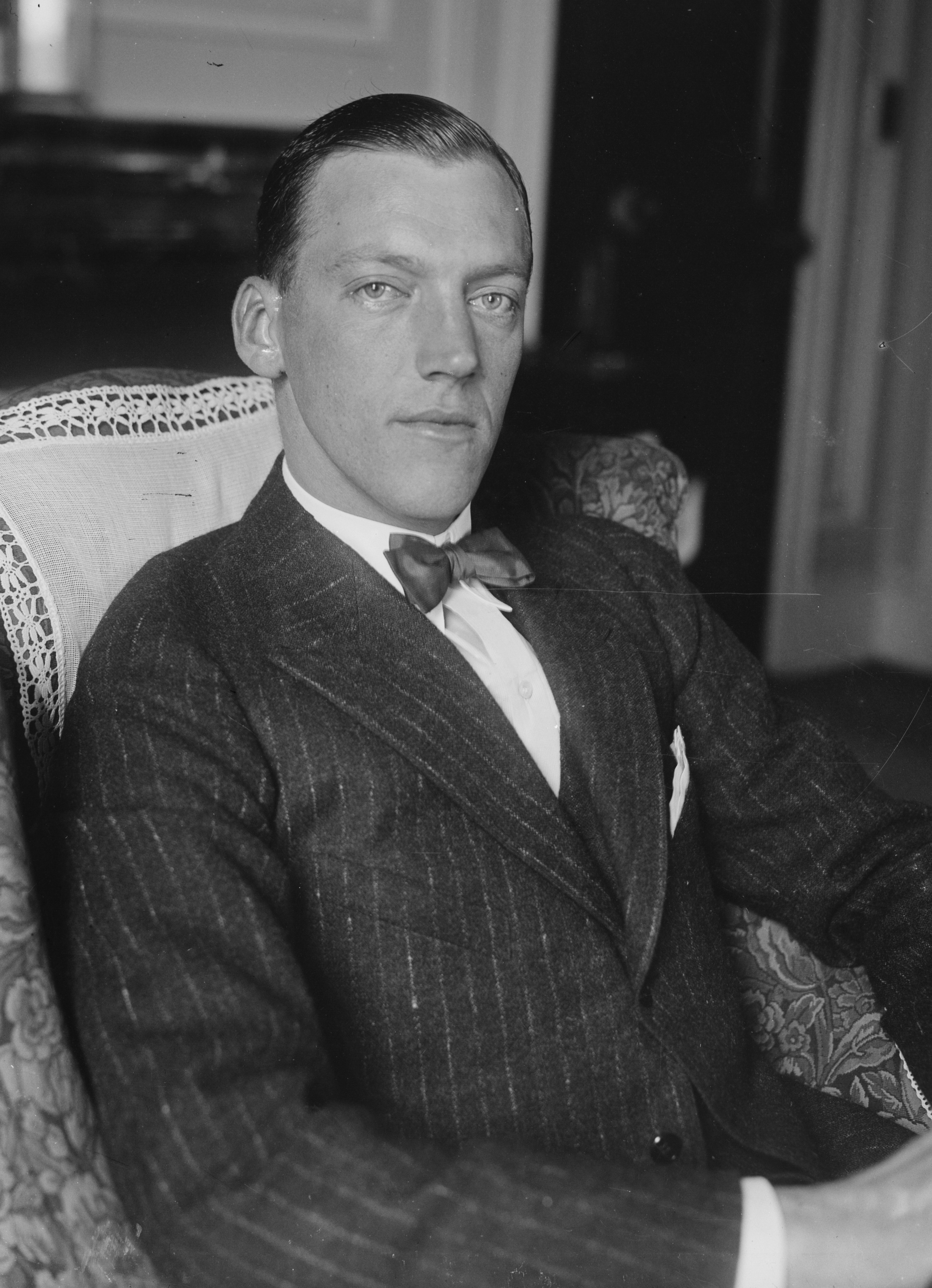
- Born: 12 August 1888; Copenhagen, Denmark
- Died: 14 July 1964 (aged 75); Copenhagen, Denmark
- Burial: Bernstorff Palace Gardens, Gentofte, Denmark
- Spouse: Princess Margaretha of Sweden (m. 1919)
- Issue: Prince Georg; Count Flemming of Rosenborg
Names
- Axel Christian Georg
- House: Glücksburg
- Father: Prince Valdemar of Denmark
- Mother: Princess Marie of Orléans

Prince Axel of Denmark, RE, SKmd (Danish: Prins Axel Christian Georg til Danmark; 12 August 1888 – 14 July 1964) was a member of the Danish royal family, businessman and sports administrator. He was the second son of Prince Valdemar of Denmark and Princess Marie of Orléans, and a grandson of King Christian IX of Denmark.

On his father's side, he was a first cousin of King Christian X of Denmark, King Haakon VII of Norway and his wife Queen Maud, King Constantine I of Greece, King George V of the United Kingdom, Emperor Nicholas II of Russia, Ernest Augustus III, Duke of Brunswick and Prince Andrew of Greece and Denmark, father of Prince Philip, Duke of Edinburgh, and on his mother's side of Henri, Count of Paris (1908–1999), Orleanist pretender to the French throne.

Axel was a popular patron of sports. He was a prominent International Olympic Committee member and activist and also a business executive. In 1963, Axel became the first honorary member of the IOC in history. He was an officer in the Royal Danish Navy.

== Life and family ==
=== Early life and military career ===
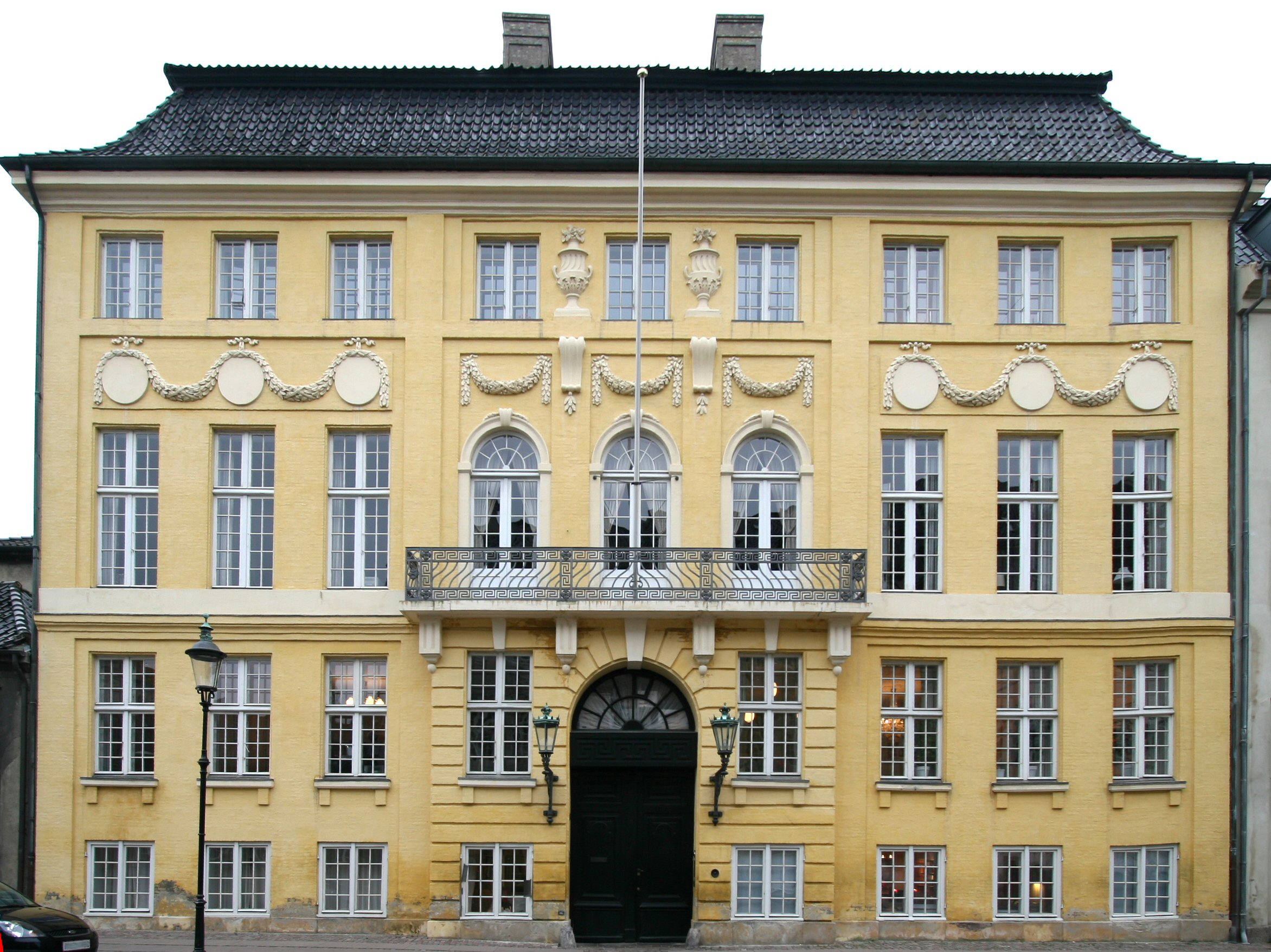
The Yellow Palace, Copenhagen: Prince Axel's childhood home

Axel was born on 12 August 1888, in the Yellow Palace, an 18th-century town house at 18 Amaliegade, immediately adjacent to the Amalienborg Palace complex in Copenhagen. He was the second child of Prince Valdemar of Denmark, and his wife Princess Marie of Orléans. His father was a younger son of King Christian IX of Denmark and Louise of Hesse-Kassel, and his mother was the eldest daughter of Prince Robert, Duke of Chartres and Princess Françoise of Orléans. His parents' marriage was said to be a political match.

He was christened on 16 September 1888 and his godparents were: King Christian IX and Queen Louise of Denmark (his paternal grandparents); King George I and Queen Olga of Greece (his paternal uncle and aunt); Edward and Alexandra, Prince and Princess of Wales (his paternal uncle and aunt); and Ernest August and Thyra, Duke and Duchess of Cumberland (his paternal uncle and aunt).

Axel served in the navy and gained the ranks of vice-admiral and admiral à la suite, and became the Presiding Adm. Director and BFM in A/S Det Eastasiatiske Kompagni (EAC) in Copenhagen.

=== Marriage and family ===
On 22 May 1919, he married Princess Margaretha of Sweden, his first cousin once removed and the eldest daughter of Prince Carl, Duke of Västergötland. The wedding took place in the Cathedral of Stockholm and was celebrated with great festivities around the city. Margaretha's mother, Princess Ingeborg of Denmark, was Axel's paternal first cousin, as they shared the royal grandfather, King Christian IX of Denmark. The marriage was a love match and the bride's mother remarked that the couple were so much in love that they could not be left alone in a furnished room. He was the only one of his parents' sons to contract an equal marriage. Axel and Margaretha had two sons:

- Prince George Valdemar Carl Axel (16 April 1920 – 29 September 1986) he married Anne Ferelith Fenella Bowes-Lyon on 16 September 1950.
- Prince Flemming Valdemar Carl Axel (9 March 1922 – 19 June 2002) he married Alice Nielson on 24 May 1949. They had four children.

=== Bernstorff ===
The couple was given the Bernstorffshøj, a villa located near Bernstorff Palace in Gentofte, outside Copenhagen, as their wedding gift and settled there immediately in 1919. The Bernstorff estate was the residence of Prince Valdemar and his family, inherited by him from his father, Christian IX, in 1906. The Bernstorffshøj was the birthplace of Axel and Margaretha's elder son, Georg, in 1920. In June 1936 the original 19th-century house was seriously damaged by a fire caused by a maid leaving an electric iron plugged into a socket. After that accident, Axel rebuilt it on a grander scale. He chose Helweg Møller as the main architect. Møller's logo, a star, appears on the door handles and other places in the home. Axel had been a naval officer and the house was designed to evoke being on a ship, with the bridge situated on the top terrace and the compass set into the marble in the front hall. After the death of Valdemar in 1939, the right to use the whole Bernstorff estate passed to Axel, but he chose to remain in the more modest Bernstorffshøj. Since he ceased to use the palace and until very recently, it was used by the Danish Emergency Management Agency as an academy for non-commissioned officers. However, the Prince petitioned the government to permit him and his family to be buried on the grounds of the Palace.

During the German occupation of Denmark during the World War II, the Bernstorffshøj villa was the meeting place for members of the Danish Resistance and the neighbouring Brødrehøj was used as an arsenal for the Resistance. This led to Axel being put under house arrest for a while. He took part in the ship tour organized by King Paul of Greece and Queen Frederica in 1954, which became known as the "Cruise of the Kings" and was attended by over 100 royals from all over Europe.

After the death of Margaretha in 1977, the site of her and Axel's residence in Bernstorff was bought in 1978 by the British Government and became the residence of Britain's ambassador in Denmark. The new occupants maintain the late princely couple's private library in situ. It contains a significant number of books about fishing and sailing, most of them in English and Danish. Some of the books contain written inscriptions to Axel from other European royalty.

=== Death and burial ===
Axel lived with his wife, Margaretha, at the Bernstorffshøj villa until his death. He died on 14 July 1964 at Bispebjerg Hospital in the Bispebjerg district of Copenhagen. His wife died on 4 January 1977 in Tranemosegård, Kongsted – near Fakse. They are both buried on the grounds of Bernstorff Palace, alongside their sons and daughters-in law.

== Official duties and interests ==
Axel was one of the godparents of future Queen Margrethe II of Denmark at her baptism on 14 May 1940 in the Church of Holmen in Copenhagen. In 1947, Axel and Margaretha, together with their sons, Princes Georg and Flemming, were among the official guests at the wedding of Princess Elizabeth, the future Queen Elizabeth II of the United Kingdom, and Philip, Duke of Edinburgh (the former Prince Philip of Greece and Denmark). As a result of the Act of Succession of 1953, which restricts the throne to those descended from Christian X and his wife, Alexandrine of Mecklenburg-Schwerin, through approved marriages, he lost his place in the line of succession unlike his son Flemming in 1949.

=== Sports ===
Axel was a popular figure in Denmark, involved in the promotion and development of sports as well as business. He was a longtime member of the International Olympic Committee for Denmark. At the 55th IOC Session in Tokyo in 1958, Axel, a member of the IOC taking part in the session, officially proposed making the work composed by Spyridon Samaras the official Olympic anthem. Axel was a prominent member of the IOC and he openly supported Lord Porritt's proposal of limiting the age of the Committee members to 70 since the St. Moritz session in 1948. However, the proposals were not accepted by the majority of the committee and they were finally implemented in 1966. For his services to the Olympic movement, he was awarded unanimously the Olympic Order of Merit in 1963. Since his election as a member of the IOC in 1932, Axel travelled over 160,000 kilometres around the world in advance of his duties. In 31 years of his active service in the committee, he missed only one of its sessions. In 1963, Axel was nominated to become the first honorary member of the IOC.

Axel was a pioneer of motor sports in Denmark, president of the Royal Danish Automobile Club from 1920 until 1938. He held Denmark's number 10 pilot's licence, acquired in 1912.

=== Business ===
In 1948, during his visit to Melbourne, Australia as an IOC member and an executive of the 1956 Summer Olympics organising committee, he discussed also widely possible expansion of the SAS air business in Australia, in his capacity as a member of the board of the company.

== Honours ==
Danish orders and decorations

- Knight of the Order of the Elephant, 12 August 1906
- Cross of Honour of the Order of the Dannebrog, 12 August 1906
- Grand Commander of the Order of the Dannebrog, 26 March 1947
- King Christian IX and Queen Louise of Denmark Golden Wedding Commemorative Medal
- King Christian IX Centenary Medal
- Navy Long Service Medal

Foreign orders and decorations

- Belgium: Grand Cordon of the Royal Order of Leopold, 1913
- Finland: Grand Cross with Collar of the Order of the White Rose
- France: Grand Cross of the Legion of Honour
- German Empire:
  - Knight of the Order of the Black Eagle
  - Grand Cross of the Order of the Red Eagle
  - Mecklenburg: Grand Cross of the Order of the Griffon
- Kingdom of Greece: Grand Cross of the Order of the Redeemer
- Kingdom of Italy:
  - Grand Cross of the Order of Saints Maurice and Lazarus
  - Golden and Silver Commemoration Medals for the 1908 Messina Earthquake
- Empire of Japan: Grand Cordon of the Order of the Rising Sun, with Paulownia Flowers
- Netherlands:
  - Grand Cross of the Order of the Netherlands Lion
  - Queen Juliana Memorial Medal
- Norway: Grand Cross of the Royal Norwegian Order of St. Olav, with Collar, 31 October 1924
- Ottoman Empire: Order of Osmanieh, 1st Class in Diamonds
- Poland: Grand Cross of the Order of Polonia Restituta
- Sweden:
  - Knight of the Order of the Seraphim, 23 March 1919
  - King Gustav V Jubilee Medal, 1928
- Thailand:
  - Knight of the Order of the Royal House of Chakri, 20 January 1949
  - Grand Cross of the Order of the White Elephant
  - Grand Cross of the Order of the Crown of Thailand
- (United Kingdom) :
  - Honorary Grand Cross of the Royal Victorian Order
  - Queen Elizabeth II Coronation Medal, 2 June 1953

Military appointments

- Admiral in the Royal Danish Navy

Other honours

- Olympic Diploma of Merit, 1963

== Ancestry ==
Ancestors of Prince Axel of Denmark

8. Friedrich Wilhelm, Duke of Schleswig-Holstein-Sonderburg-Glücksburg
4. Christian IX of Denmark
9. Princess Louise Caroline of Hesse-Kassel
2. Prince Valdemar of Denmark
10. Prince William of Hesse-Kassel
5. Princess Louise of Hesse-Kassel
11. Princess Charlotte of Denmark
1. Prince Axel of Denmark
12. Prince Ferdinand Philippe, Duke of Orléans
6. Prince Robert, Duke of Chartres
13. Duchess Helene of Mecklenburg-Schwerin
3. Princess Marie of Orléans
14. François, Prince of Joinville
7. Princess Françoise of Orléans
15. Princess Francisca of Brazil
