= Louise of Hesse-Kassel =

Queen of Denmark from 1863 to 1898

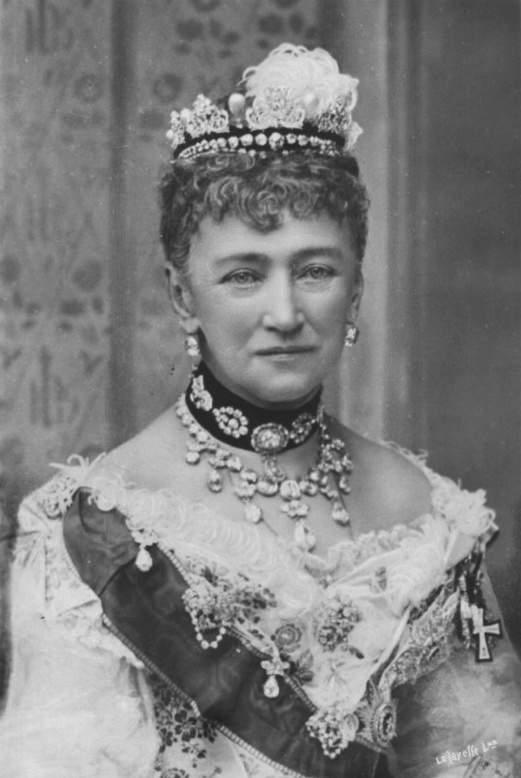
- Portrait, 1893

Queen consort of Denmark
- Tenure: 15 November 1863 – 29 September 1898

Duchess consort of Schleswig, Holstein and Lauenburg
- Tenure: 15 November 1863 – 30 October 1864
- Born: 7 September 1817; Kassel, Electorate of Hesse, German Confederation
- Died: 29 September 1898 (aged 81); Bernstorff Palace, Gentofte, Denmark
- Burial: 15 October 1898; Roskilde Cathedral
- Spouse: Christian IX of Denmark (m. 1842)
- Issue: Frederick VIII of Denmark; Alexandra, Queen of the United Kingdom; George I of Greece; Dagmar, Empress of Russia; Thyra, Crown Princess of Hanover; Prince Valdemar
Names
- German: Luise Wilhelmine Friederike Caroline Auguste Julie; Danish: Louise Wilhelmine Frederikke Caroline Auguste Julie
- House: Hesse-Kassel
- Father: Prince William of Hesse-Kassel
- Mother: Princess Charlotte of Denmark

Louise of Hesse-Kassel (German: Luise Wilhelmine Friederike Caroline Auguste Julie, Danish: Louise Vilhelmine Frederikke Caroline Auguste Julie; 7 September 1817 – 29 September 1898) was Queen of Denmark as the wife of King Christian IX, from 15 November 1863 until her death in 1898. From 1863 to 1864, she was concurrently Duchess of Schleswig, Holstein and Lauenburg. Born in Kassel, she was the daughter of Prince William of Hesse-Kassel and Princess Charlotte of Denmark, and a niece of King Christian VIII. Through her descent from King Frederick III, she supported her husband's claim to the Danish throne.

Louise played a pivotal dynastic role as the mother of six children who married into several European royal houses, earning Christian IX the epithet "Father-in-law of Europe." Her children included King Frederick VIII of Denmark, Queen Alexandra of the United Kingdom, King George I of Greece, Empress Maria Feodorovna of Russia, Thyra, Crown Princess of Hanover, and Prince Valdemar of Denmark. She died at Bernstorff Palace in Gentofte and was buried at Roskilde Cathedral.

== Life ==
=== Early life and relation to the royal family ===
Louise was born as the daughter of Prince William of Hesse-Kassel and Princess Charlotte of Denmark. Her siblings included Princess Marie Luise Charlotte of Hesse-Kassel, Prince Frederick William of Hesse-Kassel and Princess Auguste Sophie Friederike of Hesse-Kassel. Louise of Hesse lived in Denmark from the age of three.

As a niece of King Christian VIII, who ruled Denmark between 1839 and 1848, Louise was very close to the succession after several individuals of the royal house of Denmark who were elderly and childless. As children, her brother Frederick Wilhelm, her sisters and she were the closest relatives of King Christian VIII who were likely to produce heirs. It was increasingly obvious that the traditional male line succession might come to an end within a generation as the crown prince was childless despite two marriages. Louise was one of the females descending from Frederick III of Denmark, and she enjoyed the remainder provisions of the Danish succession according to the King's Law in the event that Frederick III's male line became extinct.

Louise and her siblings were not agnatic descendants of the House of Oldenburg. Louise was thus ineligible to inherit the Holstein throne – which was under agnatic succession. This threatened the continued existence of the joint monarchy between Denmark and the two duchies. Denmark and its fief Schleswig both followed the succession rules in the King's Law giving Louise a strong claim to the Danish throne.

=== Marriage and succession dispute ===
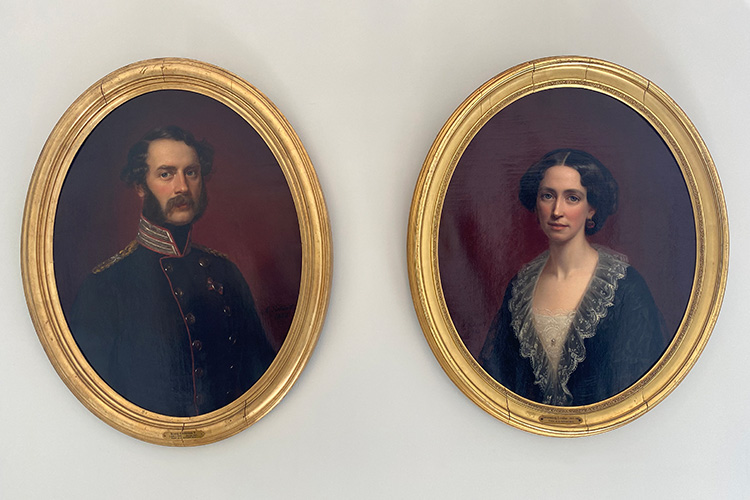
Prince Christian and Princess Louise in the 1840s.

Louise was married at the Amalienborg Palace in Copenhagen on 26 May 1842 to her double second cousin Prince Christian of Schleswig-Holstein-Sonderburg-Glucksburg, who in 1863 became King Christian IX of Denmark.

The marriage combined Christian's weak claim to the throne with Louise's senior claim. The couple lived a quiet family life but their claims to the throne were disputed for more than a decade.

Louise's claim to the throne was challenged by the House of Augustenborg, which held the stronger claim to the Holstein throne and a subsidiary claim to the Danish and Schleswig thrones. The House of Augustenborg argued that the King's Law was purely agnatic and presented itself as the opportunity to preserve the undivided monarchy.

In 1847, King Christian VIII decided that the throne should pass to Prince Christian of Glücksburg in the event that crown prince Frederick (the later Frederick VII) fathered no dynastic sons. This choice was communicated to the Great Powers of Europe.

The situation remained disputed, and succession was a main reason for the House of Augustenburg rebelling against Denmark in the 1848–51 First Schleswig War. That house was consequently struck from the line of succession. This cemented that Prince Christian of Glücksburg would become the next monarch.

Louise's mother and siblings renounced their rights to the Danish throne to her, and Louise herself in turn renounced her rights in favour of her husband. In 1852, this succession order was confirmed by the Nordic countries and foreign powers in London.

Christian and Louise's children would now be heirs to the Danish throne both due to compliance with the King's Law and due to international treaty. This resolved the succession to the Danish crown, but not Denmark's future relation to the duchies of Schleswig and Holstein. German Holstein's historic law of succession was Salic, thus exclusively male, and could not easily be reconciled with Christian's claim as long as the Augustenborgs survived and Prussia offered itself as the international champion of German nationalism. In 1864, this conflict resulted in the Second Schleswig War.

By 1853, Denmark had become a constitutional monarchy and Parliament amended the Danish law of succession proclaiming Christian Hereditary Prince of Denmark, thus cementing that he would succeed when King Frederick VII died (unless the uncle of King Frederick, Prince Ferdinand, would outlive his nephew). Although Frederick disapproved of this choice, he signed it into law on 3 July 1853.

Louise disapproved of Frederick VII's non-dynastic marriage to Louise Rasmussen, and in turn the King disapproved of Christian succeeding him. The two couples thus had a tense relationship and spent little time together.

=== Queen of Denmark ===
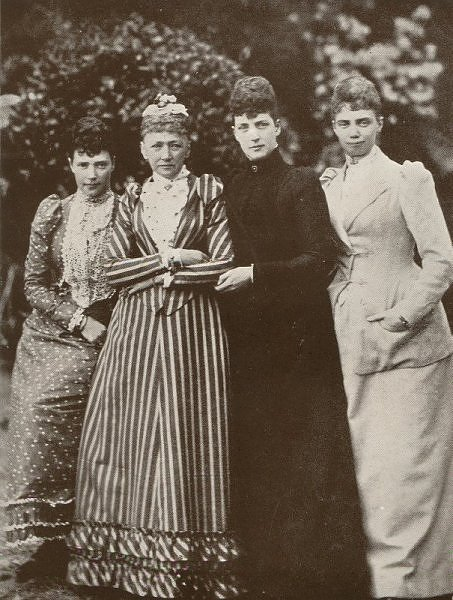
The Empress of Russia, Queen Louise, the Princess of Wales and the Crown Princess of Hanover in 1882

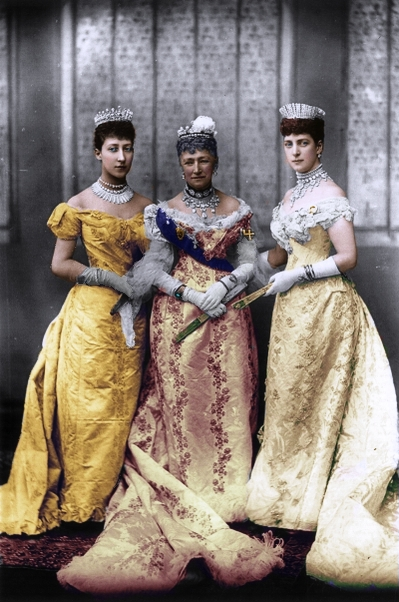
Louise (centre) with her daughter Alexandra, Princess of Wales (right), and granddaughter Louise (left) in 1893

On 15 November 1863 King Frederick VII died and Christian became King of Denmark. The relationship between Louise and Christian seems to have been at least partially a marriage of love, and is described as happy: she supported him in his struggle to be acknowledged as heir-presumptive to the throne of Denmark, and the couple became strongly attached to each other during the years of succession struggle. Her loyalty is said to have been of great importance to him, and Christian is described as dependent upon her intelligence, judgment and psychological strength, all of which were considered to be superior to his own. Their life style is described as simple and puritan, and as this suited the contemporary view of an exemplary family life, the royal family was regarded as a morally correct role model. Because of this, the pregnancy of her unmarried daughter Thyra in 1870 became a burden; Louise took control of the situation and hid it from public knowledge by sending Thyra to give birth abroad, keeping the whole affair a family secret.

As queen, Louise lived a life isolated from the people and did not seek a relationship with or recognition from the public. She took no part in state affairs; her political interests focused on the arranged dynastic marriages of her children and were affected by her anti-German views. The high status marriages she arranged for her children secured the newly established Danish dynasty international status, connecting Denmark to Great Britain, Russia, Sweden and Greece. Known as "The Mother-in-law of Europe," her annual family gatherings at Bernstorff and Fredensborg attracted more attention every year and made her a popular symbol of family life. Significant events in her life included her silver wedding anniversary on 26 May 1867, when she received great public praise; her 70th birthday celebration of 1887; the golden wedding anniversary of 1892, and her 80th birthday in 1897.

The great dynastic success of Louise's six children was to a great extent a result of Louise's own ambitions rather than the efforts of her husband Christian IX. Some have compared Louise's dynastic capabilities with those of Queen Victoria.

She was interested in music and painting. She acted as the patron of artists such as Elisabeth Jerichau Baumann. Some of Louise's own paintings were exhibited and given as gifts to members of other royal dynasties.

Louise supported 26 different charitable organizations. Among them were Vallø stift; Kronprinsesse Louises praktiske Tjenestepigeskole (The Servant Girls' School of Crown Princess Louise) and the Dronning Louises Børnehospital (Queen Louise's Children's Hospital). In 1857, she founded the Louisestiftelsen (Louise Foundation), an orphanage for girls with the purpose of raising them to a life of domestic servants, which illustrated her deeply conservative ideals. Her most known project, and one which she herself referred to as her most important, was the Diakonissestiftelsen (The Deaconess Foundation) in 1863, which introduced the Deaconess profession in Denmark. In 1891, she initiated the Foreningen til Oprettelse af Friskolebørneasyler i Kbh.s Arbejderkvarter (Foundation for the Establishment of Charter school's Asylums in the Labour Quarters of Copenhagen). She founded the Belønnings- og Forsørgelsesforeningen (The Reward- and Self-supporting Foundation) in 1881, supported domestic servants by providing financial aid to the ill, during unemployment and in retirement. Louise was deeply conservative, and her charitable work has been interpreted as a fear of socialism and the growing workers movement.

Queen Louise died peacefully at Bernstorff Palace aged 81 on 29 September 1898 and was interred in Roskilde Cathedral near Copenhagen on 15 October 1898. During her last years, she become deaf and infirm, and her needs were taken care of by two deaconesses from the Deaconess institution she founded. Louise was queen consort of Denmark for 35 years, longer than any other Danish queen before her.

== Honours ==
=== Danish honours ===
Coat of arms

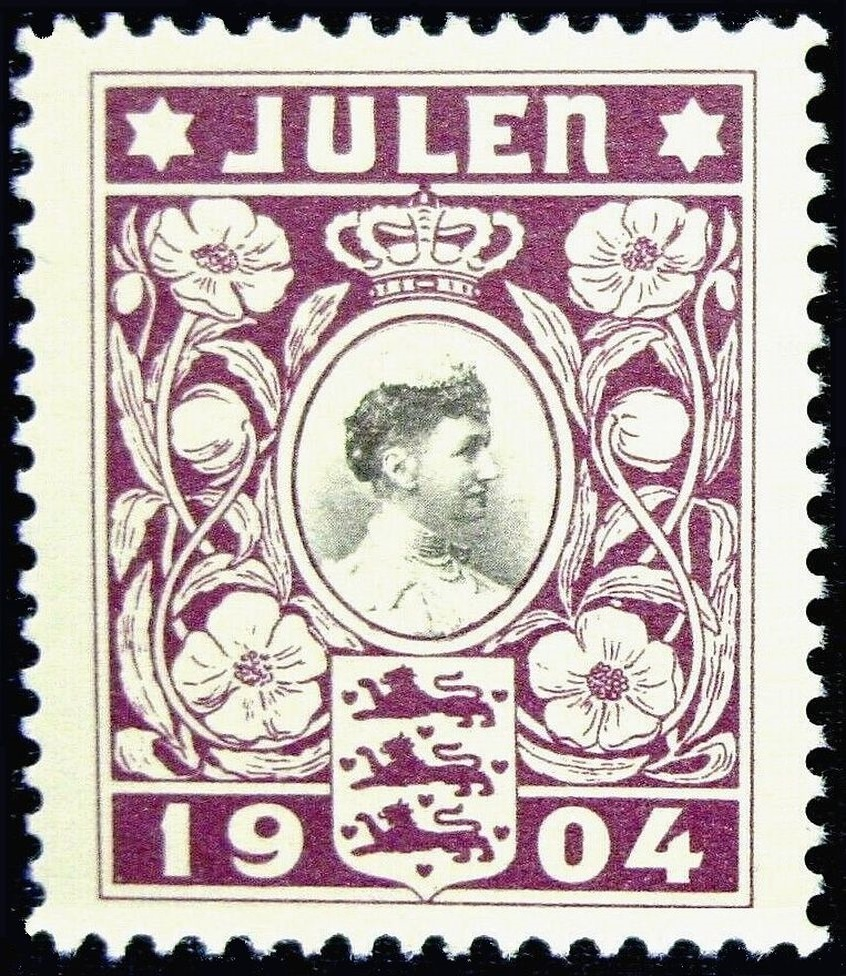
A portrait of Queen Louise was chosen to appear on the Danish Christmas seal of 1904, the world's first Christmas seal

- Honorary Dame Grand Commander of the Order of the Dannebrog, 7 September 1883
- Dame of the Order of the Elephant, 26 May 1892
- Royal Family Decoration of King Frederick VII
- Royal Family Decoration of King Christian IX

=== Foreign honours ===
- Mexican Empire: Grand Cross of the Imperial Order of Saint Charles, 10 April 1865
- Grand Duchy of Hesse: Dame of the Grand Ducal Hessian Order of the Golden Lion, 30 April 1884
- Empire of Japan: Grand Cordon of the Order of the Precious Crown, 12 April 1892
- Kingdom of Portugal: Dame of the Order of Queen Saint Isabel
- Russian Empire:
  - Dame Grand Cross of the Imperial Order of Saint Catherine
  - Red Cross Medal
- Spain: Dame of the Royal Order of Noble Ladies of Queen Maria Luisa, 25 January 1878
- United Kingdom:
  - Royal Order of Victoria and Albert, 1st Class
  - Honorary Lady of Justice of the Most Venerable Order of the Hospital of Saint John of Jerusalem

== Family ==
=== Issue ===
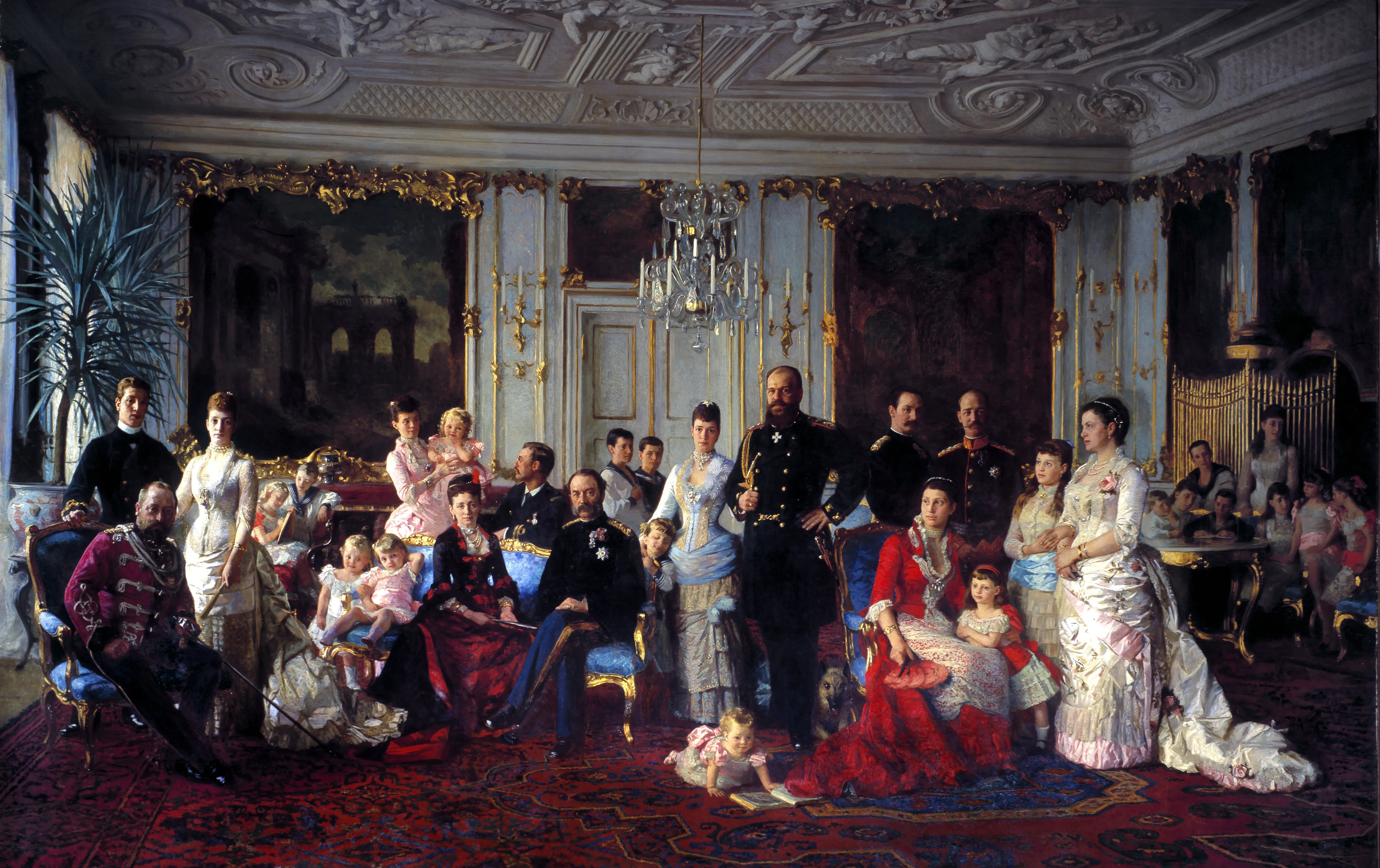
Christian IX and Louise with family gathered in the Garden Hall of Fredensborg Palace in 1883 by Laurits Tuxen

Louise had the following six children with Christian. Eventually, they had forty grandchildren, including the illegitimate daughter of Thyra.

Name	Birth	Death	Spouse	Children
Frederik VIII, King of Denmark	3 June 1843	14 May 1912	Princess Louise of Sweden	Christian X, King of Denmark; Haakon VII, King of Norway; Louise, Princess Frederick of Schaumburg-Lippe; Prince Harald of Denmark; Princess Ingeborg, Duchess of Västergötland; Princess Thyra of Denmark; Prince Gustav of Denmark; Princess Dagmar, Mrs. Castenskiold
Princess Alexandra of Denmark	1 December 1844	20 November 1925	Edward VII, King of the United Kingdom	Prince Albert Victor, Duke of Clarence and Avondale; George V, King of the United Kingdom; Louise, Princess Royal and Duchess of Fife; Princess Victoria of the United Kingdom; Maud, Queen of Norway; Prince Alexander John of Wales
George I, King of Greece	24 December 1845	18 March 1913	Grand Duchess Olga Constantinovna of Russia	Constantine I, King of Greece; Prince George of Greece and Denmark; Grand Duchess Alexandra Georgievna of Russia; Prince Nicholas of Greece and Denmark; Grand Duchess Maria Georgievna of Russia; Princess Olga of Greece and Denmark; Prince Andrew of Greece and Denmark; Prince Christopher of Greece and Denmark
Princess Dagmar of Denmark	26 November 1847	13 October 1928	Alexander III, Emperor of Russia	Nicholas II, Emperor of Russia; Grand Duke Alexander Alexandrovich of Russia; Grand Duke George Alexandrovich; Grand Duchess Xenia Alexandrovna; Grand Duke Michael Alexandrovich of Russia; Olga Alexandrovna, Duchess Peter Alexandrovich of Oldenburg
Princess Thyra of Denmark	29 September 1853	26 February 1933	Ernest Augustus, Crown Prince of Hanover	Marie Louise, Margravine of Baden; George William, Hereditary Prince of Hanover; Alexandra, Grand Duchess of Mecklenburg-Schwerin; Princess Olga of Hanover and Cumberland; Prince Christian of Hanover and Cumberland; Ernest Augustus, Prince of Hanover and Duke of Brunswick
Prince Valdemar of Denmark	27 October 1858	14 January 1939	Princess Marie of Orléans	Prince Aage, Count of Rosenborg; Prince Axel of Denmark; Prince Erik, Count of Rosenborg; Prince Viggo, Count of Rosenborg; Margaret, Princess René of Bourbon-Parma

=== Ancestry ===
Ancestors of Louise of Hesse-Kassel

8. Frederick II, Landgrave of Hesse-Kassel
4. Prince Frederick of Hesse-Kassel
9. Princess Mary of Great Britain
2. Prince William of Hesse-Kassel
10. Charles William, Prince of Nassau-Usingen
5. Princess Caroline of Nassau-Usingen
11. Countess Caroline Felizitas of Leiningen-Dagsburg-Falkenburg
1. Louise of Hesse-Kassel
12. Frederick V of Denmark
6. Frederick, Hereditary Prince of Denmark
13. Duchess Juliana Maria of Brunswick-Wolfenbüttel
3. Princess Charlotte of Denmark
14. Louis, Hereditary Prince of Mecklenburg-Schwerin
7. Duchess Sophia Frederica of Mecklenburg-Schwerin
15. Princess Charlotte Sophie of Saxe-Coburg-Saalfeld

Louise of Hesse-Kassel House of Hesse-Kassel Cadet branch of the House of Hesse Born: 7 September 1817 Died: 29 September 1898
Danish royalty
Vacant Title last held by Caroline Amalie of Augustenburg	Queen consort of Denmark; 1863–1898	Vacant Title next held by Louise of Sweden
