= Seamen's Association of 1856 =

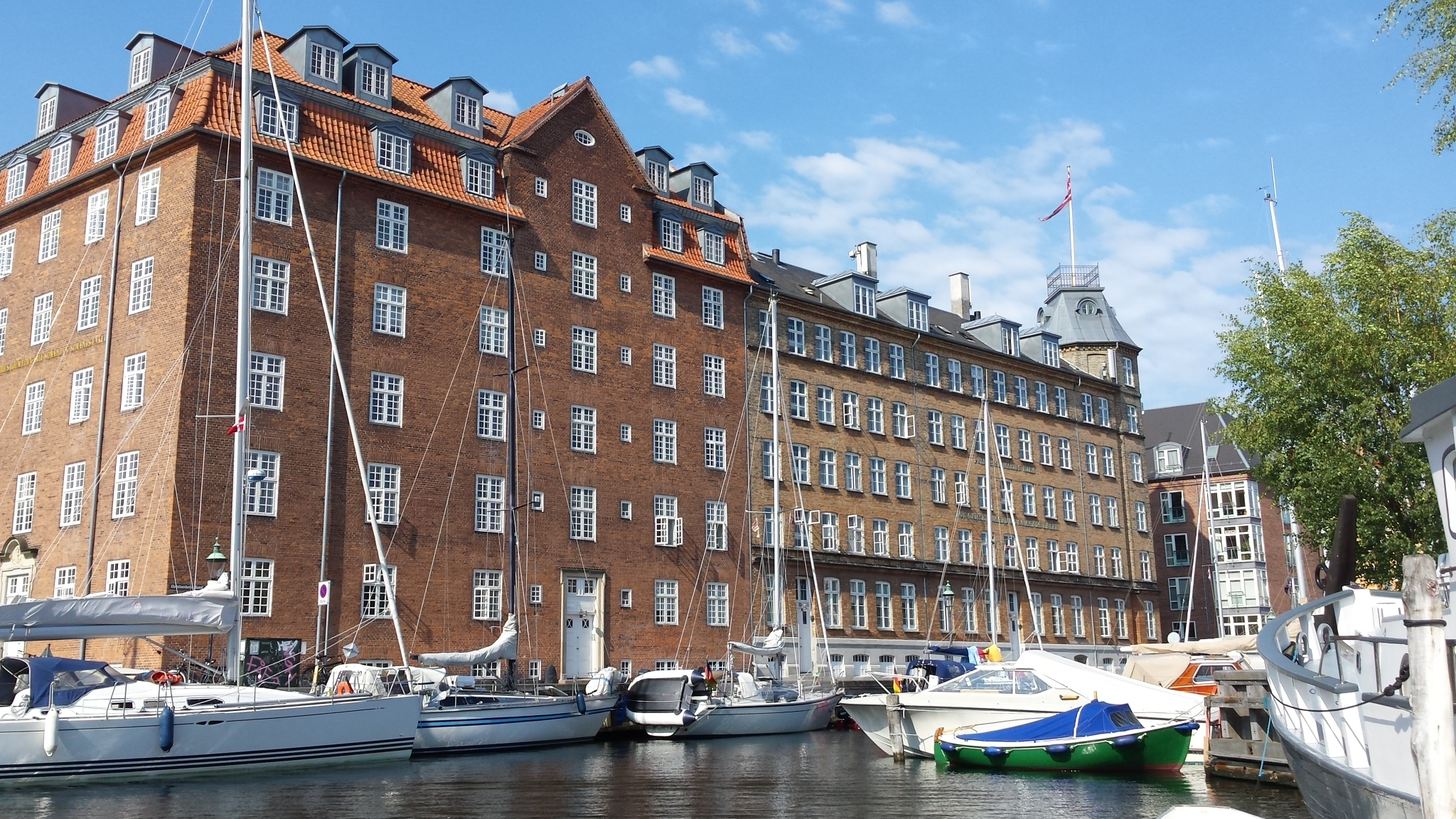
Princess Marie's Seamen's Home in Christianshavn where the association is also based

The Seamen's Association of 1856 (Danish: Sømandsforeningen af 1856) was founded in Copenhagen in 1856. It runs Princess Marie's Home for Old Seamen and Seamen's Widows (Danish: Prinsesse Maries Hjem for gamle Sømænd og Sømændsenker) in Christianshavn where the association is also based.

== History ==
The charity was created at the initiative of seaman Peter Funk. He was born in Øster Marie on the island of Bornholm in 1823. His mother died when he was four and he went to Copenhagen when he was 17 where his career as a seaman began shortly thereafter. In 1856, he presented his plans to a group of seamen at a meeting in Copenhagen. This resulted in the foundation of the Seamen's Association of 1856 (Sømandsforeningen af 1856) and the first general meeting was held the following year. The association got off to a very slow start but in 1858 Funk met naval lieutenant A. B. Rothe who had read about the organization in the newspaper. A new general meeting was arranged, a committee was set up and new statutes adopted. Rothe was elected as new chairman but Funk remained on the board until 1860 when he failed to be reelected. The first president of the new association was Prince Valdemar, King Christian IX's son.

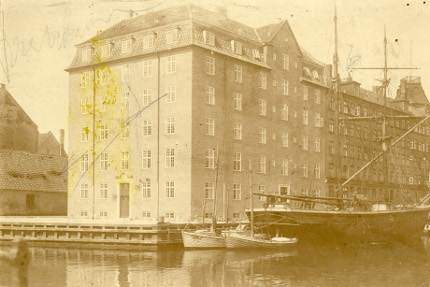
Princess Marie's Home after the expansion in 1912

The seamen's home was inaugurated on 26 February 1875 in the presence of Christian IX. It consisted of 73 apartments as well as a small section with 22 rooms where young seamen could stay while they waited for work. It also contained a dining hall, a bathroom and a reading room with 350 books.

In 1911 the seamen's home went through a major renovation and reopened as Princess Marie's Home for Old Seamen and Seamen's Widows. The new name commemorated Princess Marie, Prince Valdemar's wife, who had suddenly died in 1909. Together with her husband, she was among the association's largest benefactors and she had personally led several national collections for the support of the families of the seamen who drowned in the Harboøre Accident of 1894 and the North Sea Accident of 1896. A memorial to the princess was unveiled at Langelinie in 1912.

== Princess Marie's Home for Old Seamen ==
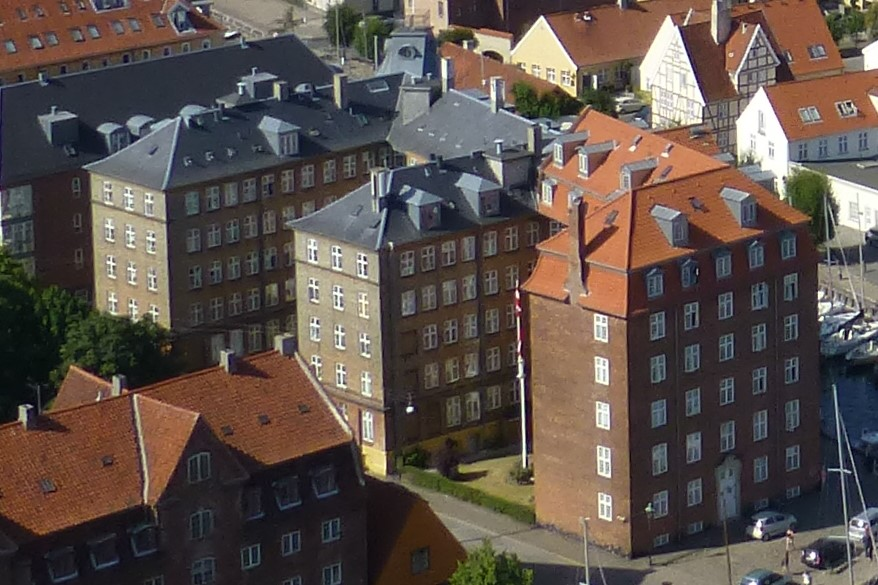
The building seen from the top of the Church of Our Saviour

The oldest part of the building (Christianshavns Kanal 8-10/Wildersgade 68-70/Bådsmandsstræde 9-17) was designed by Johan Schrøder. It is five storeys high and built in yellow brick. It features a small tower on the corner of Wildersgade and the canal.

The extension from 1821(Christianshavns Kanal 12/Overgaden neden Vandet 53) was designed by Olaf Schmidth. It is built in red brick in a Neo-Baroque style and consists of five storeys and a Mansard roof.

The old wing was refurbished in 1995–1999. Another renovation took place in 2007–08.

== Cultural references ==
The building is used as a location in the films Kvindelist og kærlighed (1960) and Ta' lidt solskin (1969).

== See also ==
- Bethel Seamen's Home
