= Bjergbygaard =

Manor house at Holbæk, Denmark

Coordinates: 55°40′32″N 11°28′47″E

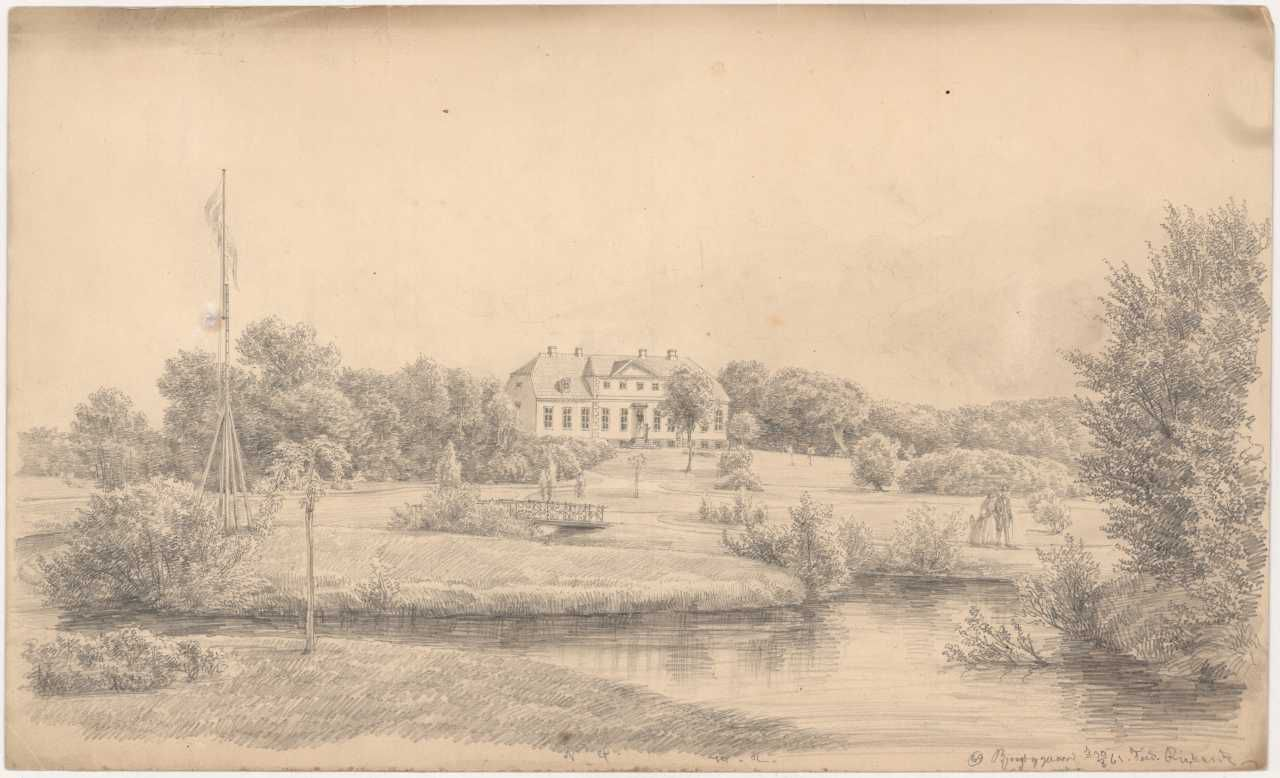
Bjergbygaard at Golbæk, Denmark

Bjergbygaard is a manor house and estate located at Holbæk, Denmark.

== History ==
=== Early history ===
The estate is first mentioned in the Danish Census Book under the name Stighsburg and was then crown land. In the 14th century, The knight Peder Karlsen is recorded as the owner in 1326. On his death in 1361, it was passed to his daughter, Christine, who was married to Mogens Johansen. Their daughter pledged the estate in 1371 and after that the ownership seems to have been divided between multiple owners. Jep Bille was later the sole owner of the estate but the ownership was then once again spread out on multiple owners. In the 16th century, all the stakes came in the hands of the Dresselbjerg family and Niels Andersen Dresselbjerg was at the time of his death in 1594 the sole owner of the estate. Bjergbygaard was then passed to his sons Anders and Hans Dresselbjerg. Their brother Vilhelm Nielsen Dresselberg,'s son-in-law, Frederik Parsberg, owned Bjergbygaard from 1616. His wife, Mette Dresselbjerg, died in 1635. He was then married secondly to Sophie Kaas. She bought the estate from her late husband's sons by his first wife. She ceded the estate to her son-in-law, Claus Maltesen Sehested, who sold it in 1691.

The new owner was Johan Adolf de Clerque. In 1730, he sold it to Albrecht Philip von Eynden. Bjergbygaard changed hands a number of times over the next decades before it was acquired by Peter Johansen Neergaard in 1766. He expanded the main building and increased the size of the estate through the acquisition of more land.

=== Bornemann family ===
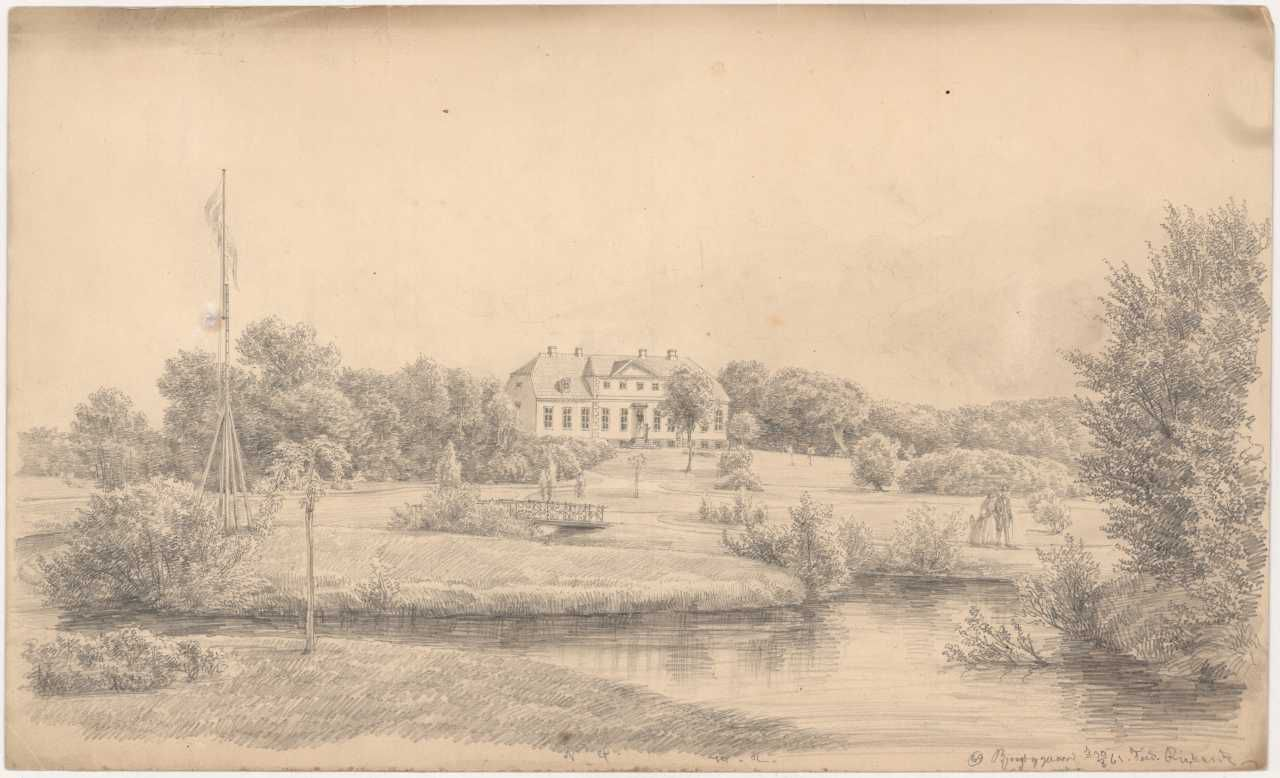
Bjergbygaard by Ferdinand Richardt in 1861

In 1803, Bjergbygaard was acquired by Cosmus Bornemann. He constructed a new main building. After his death, Bjergbygaard passed first to his widow and then to his son Philip Julius Bornemann. He discontinued his army career to settle on the estate. In 1840, he was awarded the title of ritmester. On 13 September 1844, he founded the Bornemann'ske Fideikommis (family trust). He was married to Julie Frederikke Dinesen (1809-1880), daughter of the owner of Jragerup. Their son and only child, Cosmus, who was born in 1839, died childless in 1873.

After Philip Julius Bornemann's death, Bjergbygaard passed to his grandson, Alphonsem Baron Walleen.

=== Later history ===
In 1888, Bjergbygaard was acquired by count A. Brockenhuus-Schack. As a result of the lensafløsningslov of 1919, he sold the estate in 1926 after first selling off land for 21 independent smallholdings.

Lois Frances Booth, the wife of Prince Erik, Count of Rosenborg, purchased Bjergbygaard in 1931. The couple was divorced in 1937 and the following year Lois Frances Booth was married to brewer Thorkild Juelsberg. She lived on the estate until her death in 1941.

== List of owners ==
- 1326- ) Peder Karlsen
- ( -1371) Christine Pedersdatter, gift Johansen
- (1371- ) Ingerd Christinesdatter
- (1371-1381) Bent Biug
- (1381- ) Otto Skaadt
- (1381-1398) Henneke Moltke
- (1392-1425) Jep Bille
- (1425-1484) Torben Jepsen Bille
- (1425-1473) Erik Jepsen Bille
- (1473- ) Arvinger efter Erik Jepsen Bille
- ( -1484) Holger Henriksen Ulfstand
- (1484-1510) Johan Oxe
- (1484- ) Henrik Jensen Dresselbjerg
- ( - ) Anders Henriksen Dresselbjerg
- ( -1594) Niels Andersen Dresselbjerg
- (1594-1616) Anders Dresselbjerg
- (1594-1616) Hans Dresselbjerg
- (1616-1640) Frederik Parsberg
- (1640- ) Vilhelm Parsberg
- (1640- ) Verner Parsberg
- (1640- ) Niels Parsberg
- (1640- ) Manderup Parsberg
- ( - ) Sophie Kaas, gift Parsberg
- ( -1691) Claus Maltesen Sehested
- (1691-1730) Johan Adolf de Clerque
- (1730-1731) Albrecht Philip von Eynden
- (1731-1745) Vibeke Krag, gift von Eynden
- (1745-1764) Christian Teilmann
- (1764-1766) Jacob Damkjær
- (1766-1772) Peter Johansen Neergaard
- (1772- ) Mette Regine, gift Neergaard
- ( -1783) Manasse Monrad
- (1783) Christian Frederik Numsen
- (1783-1803) Michael Lassen
- (1803-1819) Cosmus Bornemann
- (1819-1834) Enke efter Cosmus Bornemann
- (1834-1883) Phillip Julius Bornemann
- (1883-1888) Alphonse Walleen
- (1888-1926) A. Brockenhuus-Schack
- (1926-1931) J. Teilmann
- (1931-1941) Lois Frances Booth, grevinde af Rosenborg
- (1941-1942) Boet efter Lois Frances Booth
- (1942-1946) Frits Løvenskiold
- (1946-1990) H. Buchart-Petersen
- (1990-1998) Lars P. Jacobsen
- (1998-2004) Niels Ulrich Voetmann
- (2004-2013) Niels Vibholm
- (2013- ) Tibirg Landbrug ApS
