= Princess Françoise of Orléans (1844–1925) =

French princess; Duchess of Chartres

Françoise of Orléans
- Duchess of Chartres
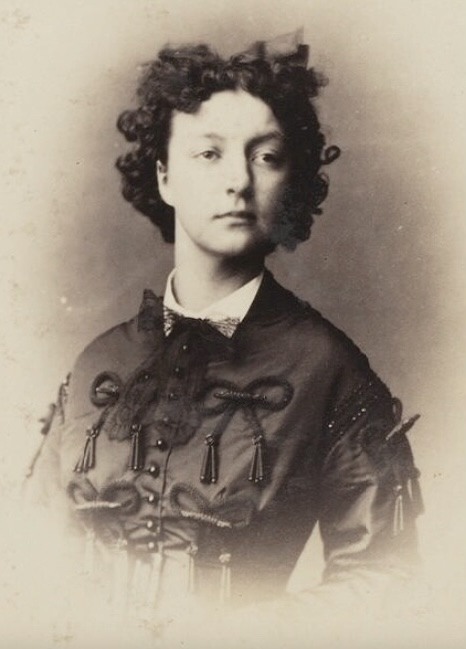
- Françoise in 1865
- Born: 14 August 1844; Neuilly-sur-Seine, France
- Died: 28 October 1925 (aged 81); Château de Saint-Firmin, France
- Burial: Chapelle royale de Dreux
- Spouse: Prince Robert, Duke of Chartres (m. 1863; died 1910)
- Issue: Marie, Princess Valdemar of Denmark; Prince Robert; Prince Henri; Marguerite, Duchess of Magenta; Prince Jean, Duke of Guise
Names
- Françoise Marie Amélie d'Orléans
- House: Orléans
- Father: François, Prince of Joinville
- Mother: Francisca of Brazil
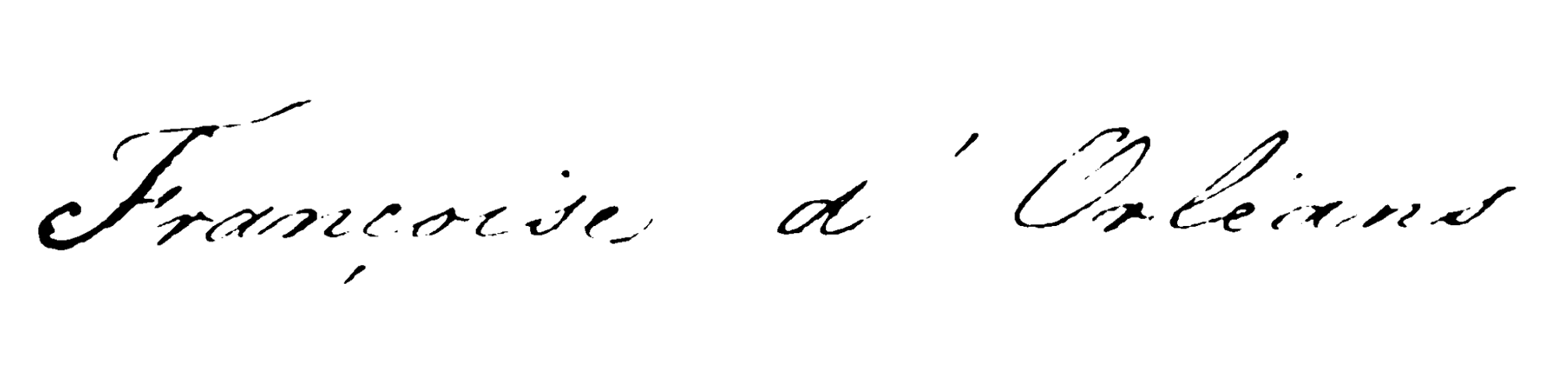
- Signature

Princess Françoise Marie Amélie of Orléans (14 August 1844 – 28 October 1925) was a member of the House of Orléans and by marriage Duchess of Chartres.

== Princess of Orléans ==
Françoise d'Orléans was born in Neuilly-sur-Seine the daughter of Prince François, Prince of Joinville (son of King Louis Philippe I), and of Princess Francisca of Brazil (daughter of Emperor Peter I of Brazil).

== Duchess of Chartres ==
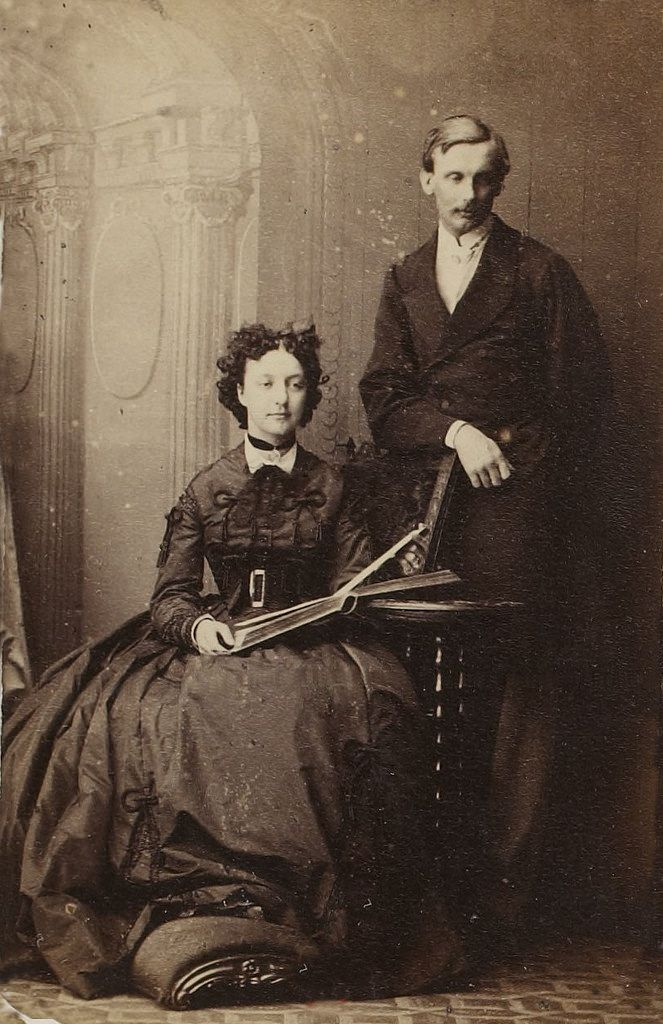
The Duchess of Chartres and her husband

On 11 June 1863 at Saint Raphael's Church in Kingston upon Thames, England, she married her first cousin Prince Robert, Duke of Chartres.They had five children. Princess Françoise died in Château de Saint-Firmin.

== Issue ==
1. Princess Marie of Orléans (1865–1909), who in 1885 married Prince Valdemar of Denmark, son of King Christian IX of Denmark.
2. Prince Robert of Orléans (1866–1885)
3. Prince Henri of Orléans (1867–1901)
4. Princess Marguerite of Orléans (1869–1940), who in 1896 married Marie-Armand-Patrice de Mac-Mahon, Duke of Magenta, son of Patrice de Mac-Mahon, Duke of Magenta.
5. Prince Jean of Orléans (1874–1940), Duke of Guise, and Orléanist pretender to the throne of France as "Jean III", who, in 1899, married his first cousin Princess Isabelle of Orléans and had issue.

== Ancestry ==
Ancestors of Princess Françoise of Orléans (1844–1925)

8. Louis Philippe II, Duke of Orléans
4. Louis Philippe I of France
9. Louise Marie Adélaïde de Bourbon
2. François, Prince of Joinville
10. Ferdinand I of the Two Sicilies
5. Maria Amalia of Naples and Sicily
11. Maria Carolina of Austria
1. Françoise of Orléans
12. John VI of Portugal and Brazil
6. Pedro I of Brazil and IV of Portugal
13. Carlota Joaquina of Spain
3. Princess Francisca of Brazil
14. Francis II, Holy Roman Emperor
7. Maria Leopoldina of Austria
15. Maria Theresa of Naples and Sicily
