= Prince Robert, Duke of Chartres =

French royal; grandson of Louis Philippe I

Prince Robert
- Duke of Chartres
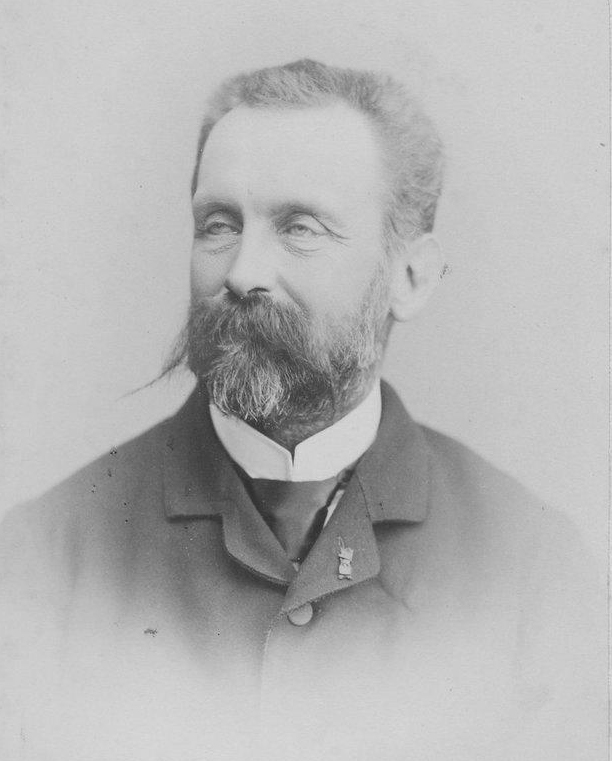
- Prince Robert, c. 1900
- Born: 9 November 1840; Paris, France
- Died: 5 December 1910 (aged 70); Saint Firmin, France
- Spouse: Princess Françoise of Orléans (m. 1863)
- Issue: Marie, Princess Valdemar of Denmark; Prince Robert; Prince Henri; Princess Marguerite, Duchess of Magenta; Prince Jean, Duke of Guise
Names
- Robert Philippe Louis Eugène Ferdinand
- House: Orléans
- Father: Prince Ferdinand Philippe, Duke of Orléans
- Mother: Duchess Helene of Mecklenburg-Schwerin
- Military career
- Conflicts: Wars of Italian Unification, American Civil War, Franco-Prussian War; Mokrani Revolt

Prince Robert, Duke of Chartres (Robert Philippe Louis Eugène Ferdinand; 9 November 1840 – 5 December 1910), was the son of Prince Ferdinand Philippe, Duke of Orléans, and thus, a grandson of King Louis Philippe I of France. He fought for the Union in the American Civil War, and then for France in the 1870 Franco-Prussian War. In 1863, he married his cousin Princess Françoise of Orléans, the daughter of François d'Orléans, Prince of Joinville. In 1886, he was exiled from France.

== Life ==
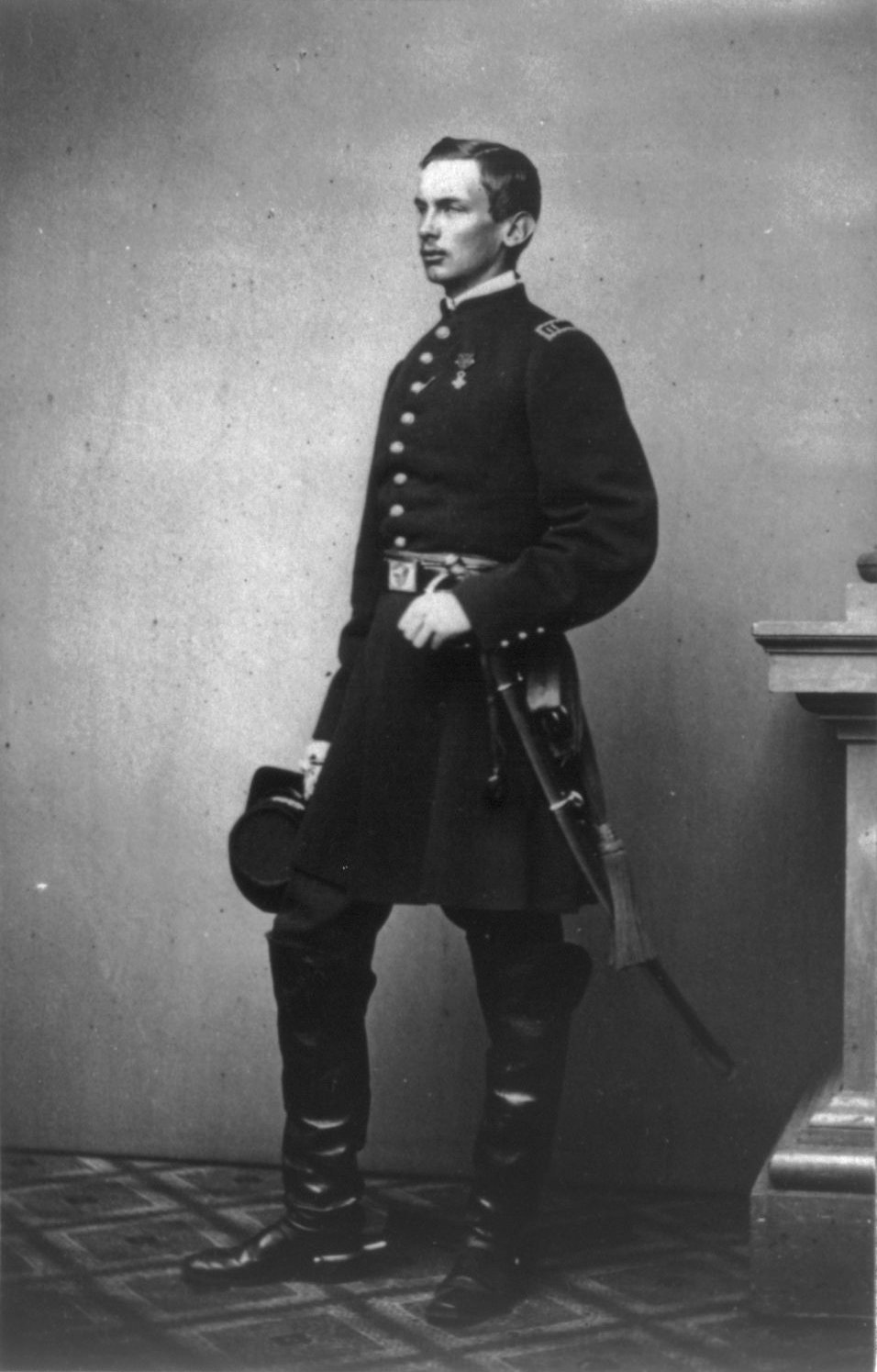
Robert d'Orleans, Duc de Chartres, as Captain in the U.S. Volunteers, 1862

Born in 1840, the duke was very soon orphaned – his father died in a carriage accident in 1842 and his mother of the flu in 1858. Thus, during their childhood and adolescence, he and his elder brother, Prince Philippe, Count of Paris, were mainly looked after by their grandparents, King Louis-Philippe and Queen Marie-Amélie.

During the French Revolution of 1848, King Louis-Philippe refused to fire upon the revolutionaries, instead abdicating his throne in favour of his grandson Philippe on 24 February. Subsequently, the boys' mother presented herself before the French Chamber of Deputies to proclaim her elder son King of the French and to have herself named regent, accompanied by her brother-in-law, the Duke of Nemours, and his children. However, the assembly, led by Ledru-Rollin, Crémieux and Lamartine, frustrated her plans and proclaimed the Second French Republic.

Helene and her children then left France for Germany, whilst King Louis-Philippe and the rest of the royal family moved to the United Kingdom. There they set up home in Claremont, which was lent to them by the owner, King Leopold I of Belgium, Louis-Philippe's son-in-law. Whilst in England in 1858, Helene died of influenza.

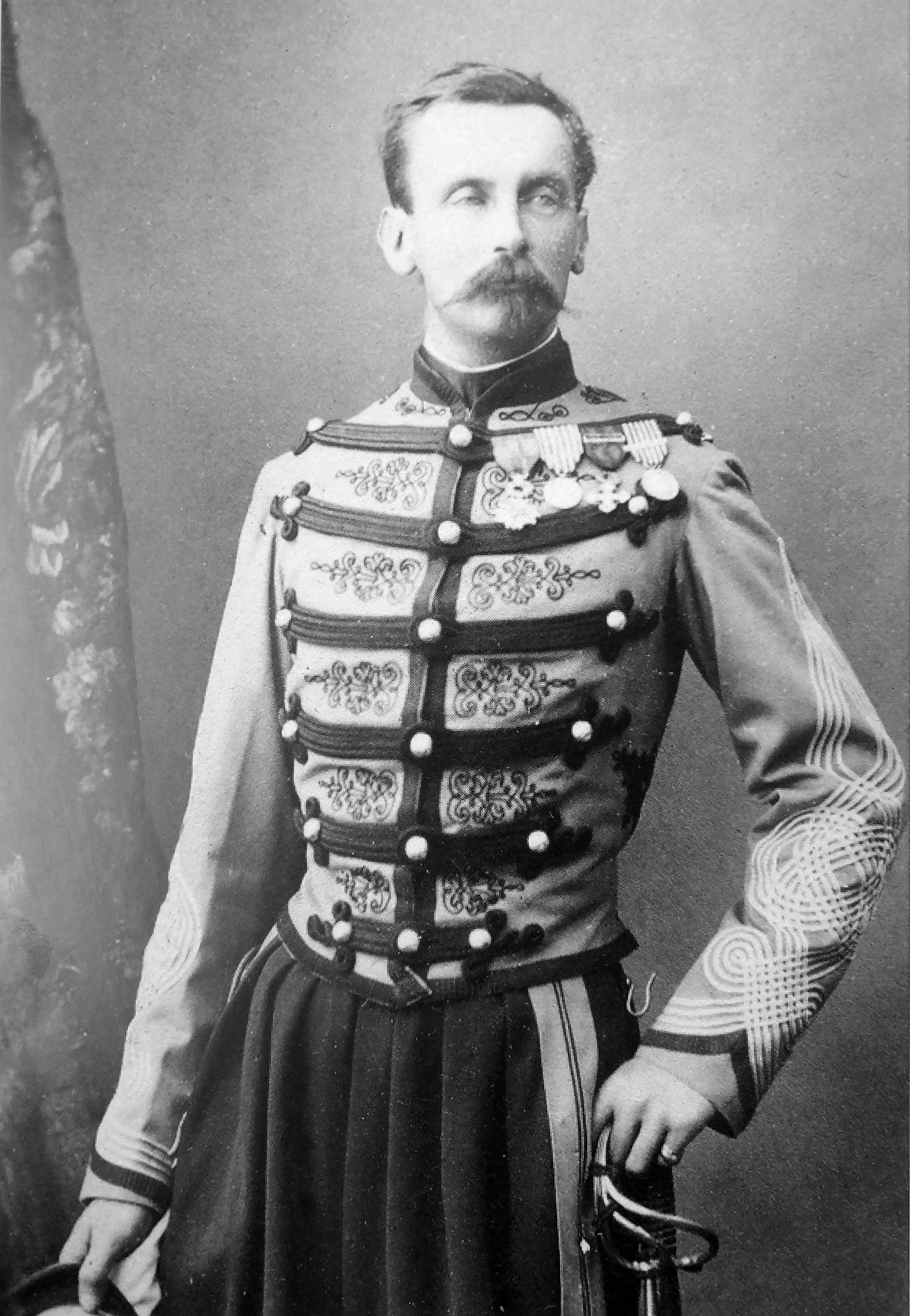
Prince Robert, c. 1860s

Sent to Turin for military training shortly after his mother's death, the Duke of Chartres became an officer in the Piedmontese dragoons and fought in the Wars of Italian Unification on the side of France and the House of Savoy from 1859 onwards. He notably fought at the Battle of Palestro, for which he was decorated by King Victor Emmanuel II.

With the outbreak of the American Civil War in April 1861, Chartres and his brother, Prince Philippe, Count of Paris, travelled to the United States to support the Union cause. On 24 September 1861, Chartres was commissioned a captain in the United States Army. He served as an assistant adjutant general on the staff of the commander of the Army of the Potomac, Major General George B. McClellan. He served in the Battle of Gaines's Mill on 27 June 1862 and resigned from the Union Army on 15 July 1862.

During their stay in the United States, the Princes were accompanied by their uncle, the Prince of Joinville, who painted many watercolours of their stay. Although eligible for membership, Chartres did not join (as his brother had) the Military Order of the Loyal Legion of the United States – an organization of Union officers who had served during the American Civil War.

Returning to Europe, the Duke of Chartres decided to marry but, as an exiled member of a royal house considered illegitimate by most of the reigning dynasties of the continent, found he would be unable to marry a foreign princess. He thus asked for the hand of his first cousin Françoise d'Orléans-Joinville, whom he married on 11 June 1863, at St Raphael's Church in Kingston upon Thames, England. They bought and lived in a house in Ham (now the site of the Cassel Hospital).

Finding himself in Brussels, with his uncles Prince François and Prince Henri, Duke of Aumale, in 1870 on the declaration of the Franco-Prussian War, the Duke of Chartres immediately requested Napoleon III's government for authorisation to fight in the conflict. However, the minister of war opposed Robert's participation in the war and he was thus unable to enroll in the French army until after the fall of the Empire. He then fought in the war under the pseudonym Robert Le Fort and was made head of a squadron in the Armée de la Loire, fighting with such distinction he was made a Chevalier (knight) of the Legion of Honour once the war was over. The provisional government kept him at that rank and in 1871 sent him to Algeria to put down a native revolt.

In 1881, the Republican regime, more and more hostile to members of former ruling families such as the House of Orléans and the House of Bonaparte, removed him from his post as colonel of the 19th Mounted Chasseur Regiment. Then, in 1886, the law of exile allowed the Republican government to remove the Prince from the Army list of officers and to exile him from France. Robert was eventually allowed to return to France and he died in Saint-Firmin in 1910.

== Issue ==
Robert and Françoise had 5 children:

- Princess Marie of Orléans (13 January 1865 – 4 December 1909), who in 1885 married Prince Valdemar of Denmark, son of King Christian IX of Denmark.
- Prince Robert d'Orléans (11 January 1866 – 30 May 1885).
- Prince Henri of Orléans (16 October 1867 – 9 August 1901).
- Princess Marguerite d'Orléans (25 January 1869 – 31 January 1940), who in 1896 married Marie Armand Patrice de Mac Mahon, Duke of Magenta, son of Patrice de Mac-Mahon, 1st Duke of Magenta.
- Prince Jean d'Orléans (4 September 1874 – 25 August 1940), "Duke of Guise" and Orléanist pretender to the throne of France as "Jean III", who in 1899 married his first cousin Princess Isabelle d'Orléans (1878–1961), daughter of Prince Philippe, Count of Paris.

== Honours ==
- France: Knight of the Legion of Honour, 14 November 1871
- Denmark: Knight of the Order of the Elephant, 14 September 1885 – as the father-in-law of a Danish Prince
- Saxe-Weimar-Eisenach: Grand Cross of the Order of the White Falcon, 20 August 1861
- Spain: Grand Cross of the Order of Charles III, 5 March 1886
- Kingdom of Portugal: Grand Cross of the Order of the Tower and Sword, 22 May 1886

== Works ==
- Histoire de la guerre civile en Amérique – 7 Bände. Paris: 1874–87

== Ancestry ==
Ancestors of Prince Robert, Duke of Chartres

8. Louis Philippe II, Duke of Orléans
4. Louis Philippe I of France
9. Louise Marie Adélaïde de Bourbon
2. Prince Ferdinand Philippe, Duke of Orléans
10. Ferdinand I of the Two Sicilies
5. Princess Marie Amélie of Naples and Sicily
11. Archduchess Maria Carolina of Austria
1. Prince Robert, Duke of Chartres
12. Frederick Francis I, Grand Duke of Mecklenburg-Schwerin
6. Frederick Louis, Hereditary Grand Duke of Mecklenburg-Schwerin
13. Princess Louise of Saxe-Gotha-Altenburg
3. Duchess Helene of Mecklenburg-Schwerin
14. Charles Augustus, Grand Duke of Saxe-Weimar-Eisenach
7. Princess Caroline Louise of Saxe-Weimar-Eisenach
15. Princess Louise of Hesse-Darmstadt

French royalty
Preceded by Prince Philippe, Count of Paris	Heir to the Throne as Heir presumptive 24 February 1848–26 February 1848	Succeeded by Jérôme Bonaparte
