= Princess Marie of Orléans (1865–1909) =

Princess Valdemar of Denmark (1865–1909)

Marie of Orléans
- Princess Valdemar of Denmark
- Marie in 1900
- Born: 13 January 1865; Ham, London, England
- Died: 4 December 1909 (aged 44); Copenhagen, Denmark
- Burial: Roskilde Cathedral
- Spouse: Prince Valdemar of Denmark (m. 1885)
- Issue: Prince Aage, Count of Rosenborg; Prince Axel; Prince Erik, Count of Rosenborg; Prince Viggo, Count of Rosenborg; Princess Margaret
Names
- French: Marie Amélie Françoise Hélène d'Orléans
- House: Orléans
- Father: Robert, Duke of Chartres
- Mother: Princess Françoise of Orléans
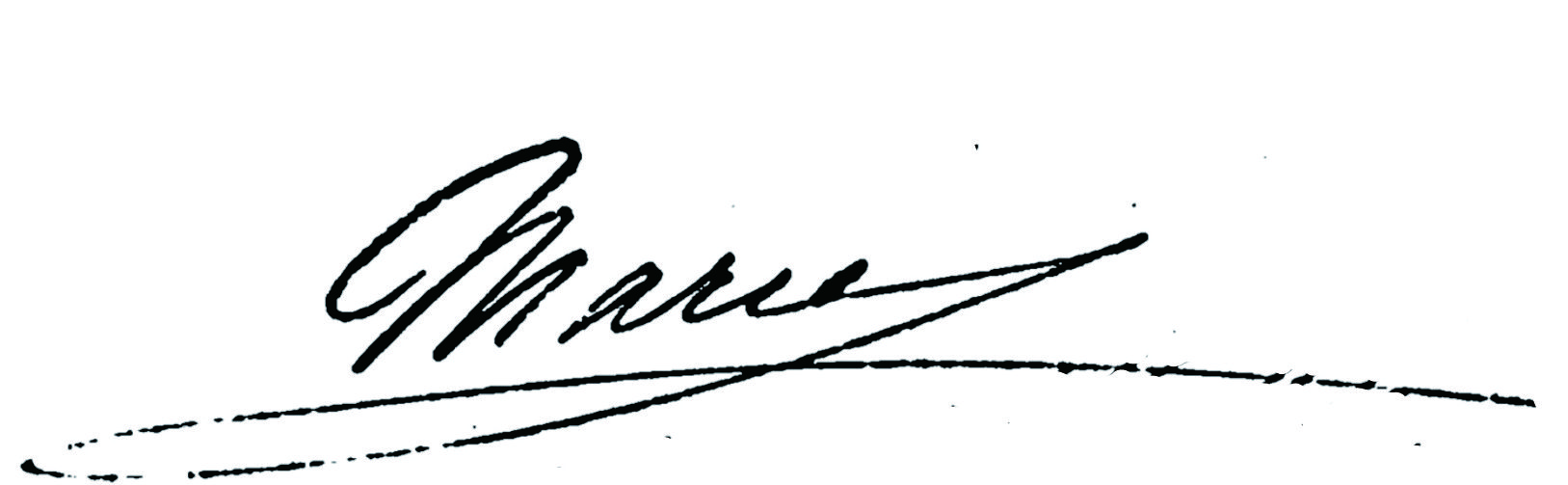
- Signature

Princess Marie of Orléans (Marie Amélie Françoise Hélène; 13 January 1865 – 4 December 1909) was a French princess by birth and a Danish princess by marriage to Prince Valdemar. She was politically active by the standards of her day.

== Biography ==
=== Background ===
Marie was the eldest child of Robert, duke of Chartres, and his wife, Princess Françoise d'Orléans. Her father was the second son of Ferdinand Philippe, Duke of Orléans, and Duchess Helena of Mecklenburg-Schwerin. Françoise was the daughter of François d'Orléans, prince de Joinville, and Princess Francisca of Brazil. She was born at Morgan House on Ham Common, London, the first of their four children born there.

Born during the reign in France of her family's rival, Napoléon III, she grew up in England, where her family had moved in 1848. She moved to France with her family after the fall of Napoleon in 1871. She defined herself as "une bourgeoise".

=== Marriage ===
After obtaining papal consent, Marie married Prince Valdemar of Denmark, the youngest son of King Christian IX of Denmark, on 20 October 1885 in a civil ceremony in Paris and again in a religious ceremony in the Château d'Eu two days later. They were third cousins, once-removed. She remained a Roman Catholic, he a Lutheran. They adhered to the dynastic arrangement usually stipulated in the marriage contract in such circumstances: sons were to be raised in the faith of their father, daughters in that of their mother.

The couple took up residence at Bernstorff Palace outside Copenhagen, in which Valdemar had been born. Since 1883, he had lived there with his nephew and ward Prince George of Greece, a younger son of Valdemar's elder brother Vilhelm, who had become King of the Hellenes in 1863 as George I. The king had taken the boy to Denmark to enlist him in the Danish navy and consigned him to the care of his brother Valdemar, who was an admiral in the Danish fleet.

Feeling abandoned by his father on this occasion, George would later describe to his fiancée, Princess Marie Bonaparte, the profound attachment he developed for his uncle from that day forward.

It was into this household and relationship that Marie came to live. In 1907, when George brought his bride to Bernstorff for the first family visit, Marie d'Orléans was at pains to explain to Marie Bonaparte the intimacy which united uncle and nephew, so deep that at the end of each of George's several yearly visits to Bernstorff, he would weep, Valdemar would feel ill, and the women learned to be patient and not intrude upon their husbands' private moments.

On this and subsequent visits, the Bonaparte princess found herself a great admirer of the Orléans princess, concluding that she was the only member of her husband's large family in Denmark and Greece endowed with brains, pluck, or character. During the first of these visits, Valdemar and Marie Bonaparte found themselves engaging in the kind of passionate intimacies she had looked forward to with her husband who, however, only seemed to enjoy them vicariously, sitting or lying beside his wife and uncle. On a later visit, George's wife carried on a passionate flirtation with Prince Aage, Valdemar's eldest son. In neither case does it appear that Marie objected, or felt obliged to give the matter any attention.

George criticized Marie to his wife, alleging that she was having an affair with his uncle's stablemaster. He also contended that she drank too much alcohol and could not conceal the effects. But Marie Bonaparte found no fault with Marie d'Orléans; rather she admired her forbearance and independence under circumstances which caused her bewilderment and estrangement from her own husband.

=== Life and influence ===
Marie was described as impulsive, witty, and energetic, and introduced a more relaxed style to the stiff Danish court. She never fully learned to speak Danish. The marriage was friendly. She gave her children a free upbringing, and her artistic taste and Bohemian habits dominated her household. She was informal, not snobbish, believed in social equality, expressed her own opinions, and performed her ceremonial duties in an unconventional manner. In 1896, she wrote to Herman Bang: "I believe that a person, regardless of her position, should be herself". She liked both to ride and to drive and was known for her elegance. She was the official protector of the fire brigade and let herself be photographed in a fire brigade uniform, which was caricatured, and as a support to her spouse's career as a marine, she had an anchor tattooed on her upper arm. She once said regarding complaints about her unconventional manners: "Let them complain, I am just as happy nevertheless".

She had asked the permission of the court to leave the house without a lady-in-waiting, and she had mainly spent her time with artists. She painted and photographed and was a student of Otto Bache and Frants Henningsen. She participated in the exhibitions at Charlottenborg in 1889, 1901 and 1902 and was a member of the Danish Arts Academy.

She refused to obey the expectation on royal women to stay away from politics. In 1886, Valdemar declined the throne of Bulgaria with her consent. She belonged to the political left and participated in convincing the king to agree to the reforms of 1901, which led to an appointment of a Venstre government, and the de facto introduction of parliamentarism. In 1902 she rejected the idea of offering the Danish West Indies to the United States. She also saw to the interests of France: she was credited by the French press with having influenced the Franco-Russian alliance in 1894 and the peace in the French-German Colonial conflict over Morocco in 1905. She assisted her friend H.N. Andersen, the founder of the East Asiatic Company, with contacts in his affairs in Thailand. She was a popular person in Denmark.

Marie's husband and three sons were in India en route to Siam when they received word that she had died at Bernstorff.

=== Issue ===
The couple had five children:

- Prince Aage of Denmark (1887–1940); created Count of Rosenborg, married Mathilda Calvi dei Conti di Bergolo in 1914 and had one son.
- Prince Axel of Denmark (1888–1964), married Princess Margaretha of Sweden in 1919 and had two sons.
- Prince Erik of Denmark (1890–1950); created Count of Rosenborg, married Lois Frances Booth in Ottawa, Canada 1924; divorced 1937, and had a son and a daughter.
- Prince Viggo of Denmark (1893–1970); created Count of Rosenborg, married Eleanor Margaret Green, and had no children.
- Princess Margaret of Denmark (1895–1992), married Prince René of Bourbon-Parma. Her daughter Anne was titular Queen of Romania.

== Legacy ==
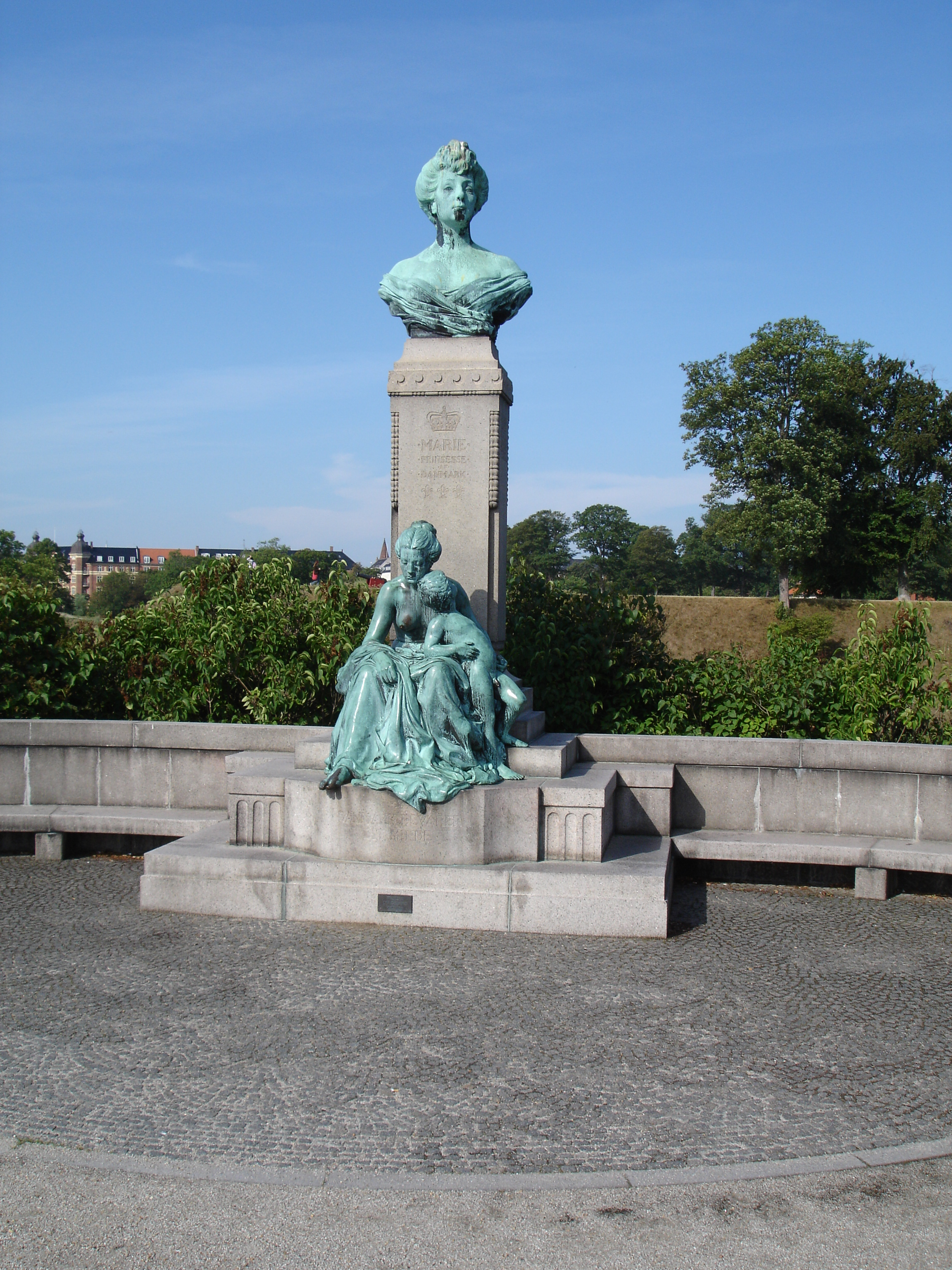
The monument at Langelinie, Copenhagen

Princess Marie is commemorated with a monument at Langelinie, near St. Alban's English Church in Copenhagen. It was installed in 1912 and features a bust created by Carl Martin-Hansen. Princess Marie's Home for Old Seamen and Seamen's Widows on Wildersgade in Christianshavn is named after her. Prinsesse Maries Allé in Frederiksberg is also named after her.

== Ancestry ==
Ancestors of Princess Marie of Orléans (1865–1909)

8. Louis Philippe I of France
4. Prince Ferdinand Philippe, Duke of Orléans
9. Princess Marie Amélie of Naples and Sicily
2. Prince Robert, Duke of Chartres
10. Frederick Louis, Hereditary Grand Duke of Mecklenburg-Schwerin
5. Duchess Helene of Mecklenburg-Schwerin
11. Princess Caroline Louise of Saxe-Weimar-Eisenach
1. Princess Marie of Orléans
12. Louis Philippe I of France (= 8)
6. François, Prince of Joinville
13. Princess Marie Amélie of Naples and Sicily (= 9)
3. Princess Françoise of Orléans
14. Pedro I of Brazil and IV of Portugal
7. Princess Francisca of Brazil
15. Archduchess Leopoldina of Austria
