= Prince Valdemar of Denmark =

Danish prince (1858–1939)

Prince Valdemar
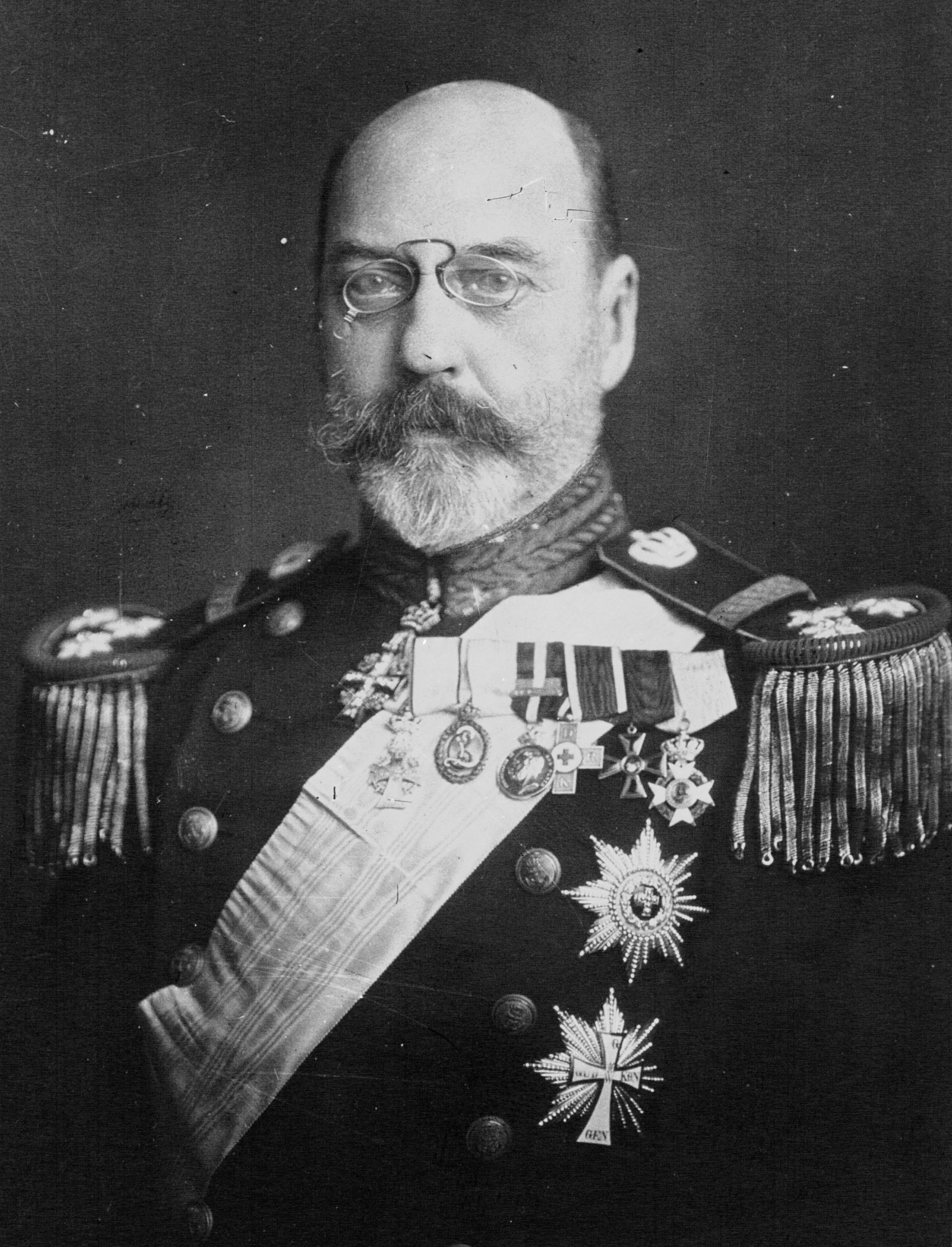
- Portrait of Prince Valdemar, 1936
- Born: 27 October 1858; Bernstorff Palace, Gentofte
- Died: 14 January 1939 (aged 80); The Yellow Palace, Copenhagen
- Burial: Roskilde Cathedral
- Spouse: Princess Marie of Orléans (m. 1885; died 1909)
- Issue: Prince Aage, Count of Rosenborg; Prince Axel; Prince Erik, Count of Rosenborg; Prince Viggo, Count of Rosenborg; Princess Margaret
- House: Glücksburg
- Father: Christian IX of Denmark
- Mother: Louise of Hesse-Kassel
- Military career
- Allegiance: Denmark
- Branch: Royal Danish Navy

Prince Valdemar of Denmark (27 October 1858 – 14 January 1939) was a member of the Danish royal family. He was the third son and youngest child of Christian IX of Denmark and Louise of Hesse-Kassel. He had a lifelong naval career.

== Early life ==
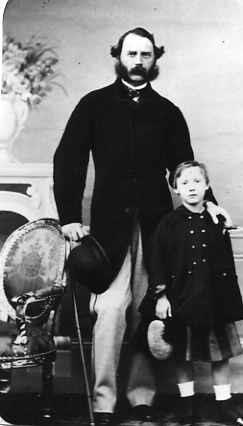
Prince Valdemar with his father Christian IX of Denmark

Prince Valdemar was born on 27 October 1858 at Bernstorff Palace in Gentofte north of Copenhagen. His father was Prince Christian of Denmark, later King Christian IX. His mother was Princess Louise of Hesse-Kassel. He was baptised on 21 December 1858. He had five older siblings: Prince Frederik (1843–1912), Princess Alexandra (1844–1925), Prince Vilhelm (1845–1913), Princess Dagmar (1847–1928), and Princess Thyra (1853–1933).

Prince Valdemar grew up in an increasingly international family. Despite the fact that the family had limited resources available and lived a relatively bourgeois life by royal standards, Valdemar's siblings managed to enter into some dynastically important marriages. In March 1863, the Danish royal family, including four-year-old Valdemar, travelled to London for the wedding of his eldest sister, Princess Alexandra, to the Prince of Wales, the son and heir-apparent of Queen Victoria. In June of the same year, Prince Valdemar's older brother Prince William was installed as King of Greece under the name of George I. And in November of the same year, his father succeeded to the throne of Denmark as King Christian IX following the death of King Frederick VII.

Prince Valdemar received his early education from tutors. In the summer of 1874, he accompanied his father during his visit to Iceland for the millennium celebrations. After his confirmation in 1874, as was customary for princes at that time, he started a military education and entered the naval college. In 1879, he was sub-lieutenant and in 1880 lieutenant. In the following years, he participated in several naval expeditions. Valdemar was homosexual, and from 1883 lived at Bernstorff Palace near Copenhagen with his nephew Prince George of Greece, who had been taken as a boy to Denmark to be enlisted in the Danish royal navy, and be consigned to the care of Valdemar, who was an admiral in the Danish fleet. Feeling abandoned by his father on this occasion, George would later describe to his fiancée the profound attachment he developed for his uncle from that day forward.

== Marriage ==
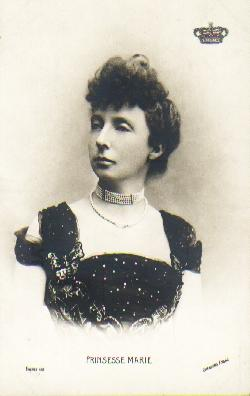
Prince Valdemar's wife Princess Marie of Orléans.

He married Princess Marie d'Orleans on 20 October 1885 in a civil ceremony in Paris. They had a religious ceremony on 22 October 1885 at the Château d'Eu, the residence of Prince Philippe, Count of Paris. The wedding was believed by one source to have been politically arranged, and in France, it was believed that the Count of Paris (the bride's uncle) was personally responsible for the match. However, the same source claimed that "there was every reason to believe that [it was] a genuine love match". At the time of their marriage, it was decided that any sons would be brought up in Valdemar's Lutheran faith, while any daughters would be raised as Catholics, the faith of their mother. The couple's four sons were consequently Lutherans, while their only daughter, Margaret was raised a Catholic and married a Catholic prince. In 1886, after the abdication of Alexander of Battenberg following a coup, the Bulgarian throne was offered to Prince Valdemar, but he and Marie agreed to refuse.

== Later life ==
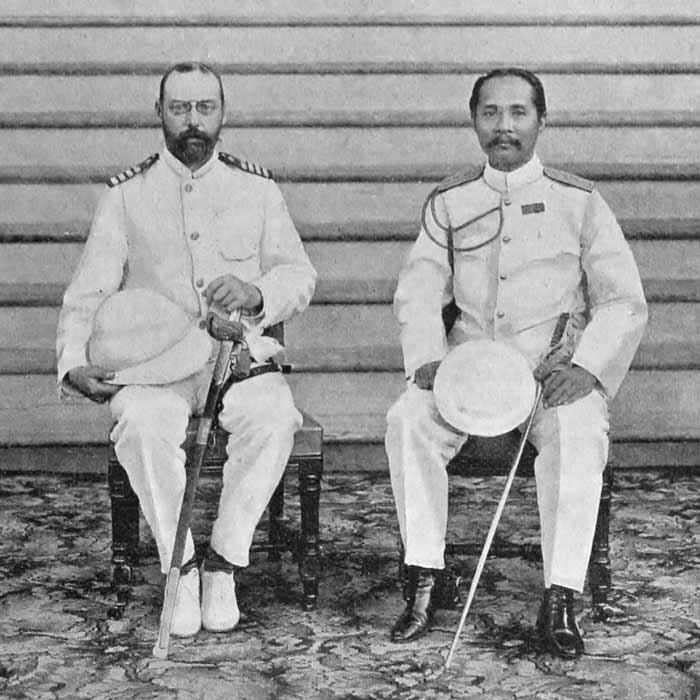
Prince Valdemar with King Chulalongkorn of Siam.

Valdemar had a lifelong naval career. He was the first president of the Seamen's Association of 1856.

He died on 14 January 1939 in the Yellow Palace in Copenhagen and was buried in Roskilde Cathedral. He was the last surviving child of Christian IX.

Coat of Arms of Prince Valdemar of Danemark

== Honours ==
Danish orders and decorations

- Knight of the Elephant, 15 November 1863
- Cross of Honour of the Order of the Dannebrog, 15 November 1863
- Grand Commander of the Dannebrog, 21 July 1900
- King Christian IX and Queen Louise of Denmark Golden Wedding Commemorative Medal
- King Christian IX Centenary Medal
- Navy Long Service Medal
- Danish Red Cross Badge of Honor
- Commemoration Medal for Danish Prisoners-of-war for the Red Cross

Foreign orders and decorations

- Austria-Hungary: Grand Cross of the Royal Hungarian Order of St. Stephen, 1888
- Belgium: Grand Cordon of the Order of Leopold, 22 July 1897
- Principality of Bulgaria: Grand Cross of St. Alexander
- France: Grand Cross of the Legion of Honour
- Kingdom of Greece: Grand Cross of the Redeemer
- Kingdom of Italy: Knight of the Annunciation, 23 September 1891
- Empire of Japan: Grand Cordon of the Order of the Chrysanthemum, 26 February 1900
- Luxembourg: Knight of the Gold Lion of Nassau
- Netherlands: Grand Cross of the Netherlands Lion
- Norway: Grand Cross of St. Olav, with Collar, 6 October 1906
- Ottoman Empire: Order of Osmanieh, 1st Class in Brilliants
- Kingdom of Portugal: Grand Cross of the Tower and Sword
- Russian Empire:
  - Knight of St. Andrew
  - Knight of St. Alexander Nevsky
  - Knight of the White Eagle
  - Knight of St. Anna, 1st Class
  - Knight of St. Stanislaus, 1st Class
  - Knight of St. Vladimir, 4th Class
- (Thailand) Siam:
  - Grand Cross of the White Elephant
  - Grand Cross of the Crown of Siam
- Sweden: Knight of the Seraphim, with Collar, 27 May 1875
- United Kingdom: Honorary Grand Cross of the Bath (civil), 17 September 1901 – during a visit to Denmark by King Edward VII and Queen Alexandra
- Kingdom of Prussia:
  - Knight of the Black Eagle
  - Grand Cross of the Red Eagle
  - Knight of the Royal Crown Order, 1st Class
- Anhalt: Grand Cross of the Order of Albert the Bear
- Baden:
  - Knight of the House Order of Fidelity, 1888
  - Knight of the Order of Berthold the First, 1888
- Brunswick: Grand Cross of the Order of Henry the Lion
- (Saxe-Coburg and Gotha) (Duchy of Saxe-Altenburg) (Saxe-Meiningen) Ernestine duchies: Grand Cross of the Saxe-Ernestine House Order
- Mecklenburg: Grand Cross of the Wendish Crown, with Crown in Ore

== Issue ==
Name	Birth	Death	Spouse	Children
Prince Aage of Denmark	10 June 1887	19 February 1940	Matilda Emilia Francesca Maria Calvi	Count Valdemar of Rosenborg
Prince Axel of Denmark	12 August 1888	14 July 1964	Princess Margaretha of Sweden	Prince Georg of Denmark; Count Flemming of Rosenborg
Prince Erik of Denmark	8 November 1890	10 September 1950	Lois Frances Booth	Countess Alexandra of Rosenborg; Count Christian of Rosenborg
Prince Viggo of Denmark	25 December 1893	4 January 1970	Eleanor Margaret Green	No children
Princess Margaret of Denmark	17 September 1895	18 September 1992	Prince René of Bourbon-Parma	Prince Jacques of Bourbon-Parma; Queen Anne of Romania; Prince Michel of Bourbon-Parma; Prince André of Bourbon-Parma

== Ancestry ==
Ancestors of Prince Valdemar of Denmark

8. Frederick Charles Louis, Duke of Schleswig-Holstein-Sonderburg-Beck
4. Frederick William, Duke of Schleswig-Holstein-Sonderburg-Glücksburg
9. Countess Friederike von Schlieben
2. Christian IX of Denmark
10. Prince Charles of Hesse-Kassel
5. Princess Louise Caroline of Hesse-Kassel
11. Princess Louise of Denmark
1. Prince Valdemar of Denmark
12. Prince Frederick of Hesse-Kassel
6. Prince William of Hesse-Kassel
13. Princess Caroline of Nassau-Usingen
3. Princess Louise of Hesse-Kassel
14. Frederick, Hereditary Prince of Denmark
7. Princess Charlotte of Denmark
15. Duchess Sophia Frederica of Mecklenburg-Schwerin
