= Saint-Firmin, Hautes-Alpes =

Saint-Firmin
- Commune
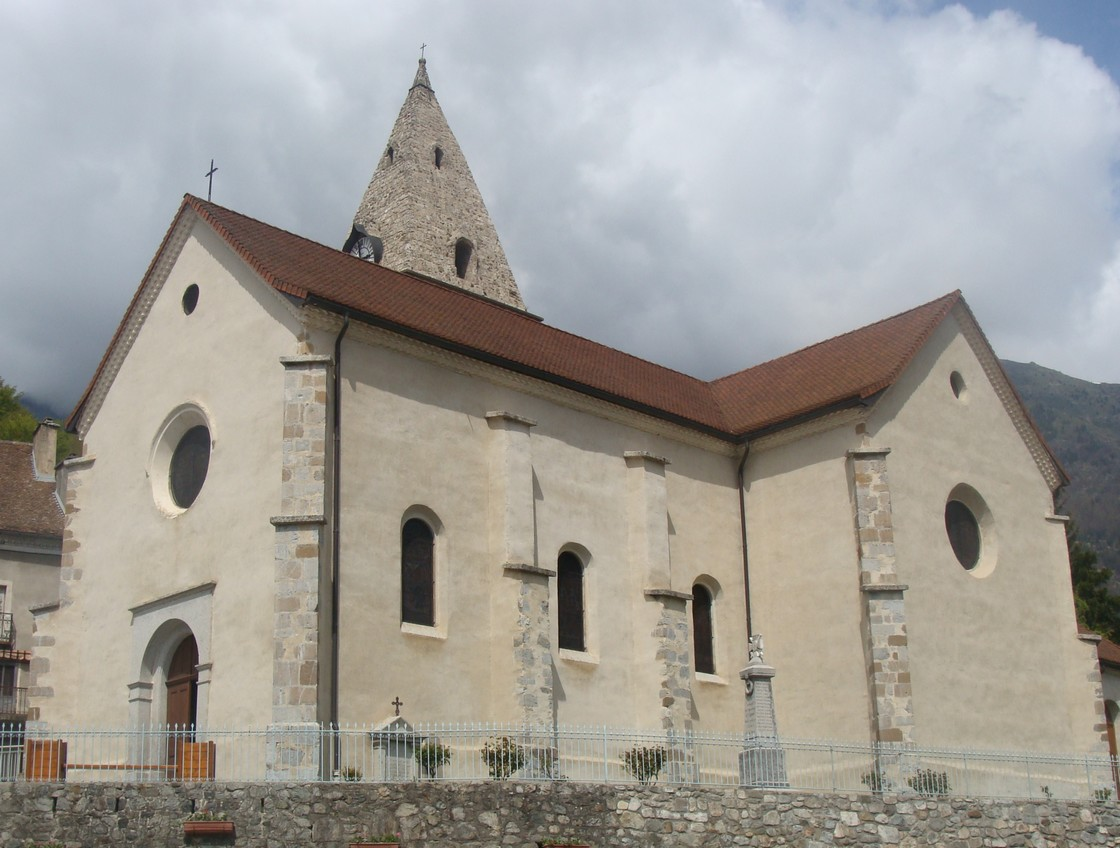
- The parish church of Saint-Firmin

- Coat of arms
- Location of Saint-Firmin
- Location within France Location within Provence-Alpes-Côte d'Azur
- Coordinates: 44°46′56″N 6°01′48″E
- Country: France
- Region: Provence-Alpes-Côte d'Azur
- Department: Hautes-Alpes
- Arrondissement: Gap
- Canton: Saint-Bonnet-en-Champsaur
- Intercommunality: Champsaur-Valgaudemar

Government
  - Mayor (2026–32): Jean-Michel Cret
- Area^{1}: 22.39 km^{2} (8.64 sq mi)
- Elevation: 900 m (3,000 ft)
- Highest elevation: 2,776 m (9,108 ft)
- Lowest elevation: 767 m (2,516 ft)
- Population (2023): 468
  - Density: 20.9/km^{2} (54.1/sq mi)
- Time zone: UTC+01:00 (CET)
  - Summer (DST): UTC+02:00 (CEST)
- INSEE/Postal code: 05142 /05800
- ^{1} French Land Register data, which excludes lakes, ponds, glaciers > 1 km^{2} (0.386 sq mi or 247 acres) and river estuaries.

Saint-Firmin (French pronunciation: [sɛ̃ fiʁmɛ̃]; Occitan: Sant Fermin) is a commune in the Hautes-Alpes department in southeastern France.

== Geography ==
=== Climate ===
Saint-Firmin has an oceanic climate (Köppen climate classification Cfb). The average annual temperature in Saint-Firmin is 9.2 °C (48.6 °F). The average annual rainfall is 1,097.0 mm (43.19 in) with October as the wettest month. The temperatures are highest on average in July, at around 18.5 °C (65.3 °F), and lowest in January, at around 0.3 °C (32.5 °F). The highest temperature ever recorded in Saint-Firmin was 37.5 °C (99.5 °F) on 19 August 2012; the coldest temperature ever recorded was −23.5 °C (−10.3 °F) on 27 December 1962.

Climate data for Saint-Firmin (1981–2010 averages, extremes 1951−present)
Month	Jan	Feb	Mar	Apr	May	Jun	Jul	Aug	Sep	Oct	Nov	Dec	Year
Record high °C (°F)	17.7 (63.9)	21.7 (71.1)	24.6 (76.3)	26.5 (79.7)	31.3 (88.3)	36.0 (96.8)	36.5 (97.7)	37.5 (99.5)	33.0 (91.4)	27.6 (81.7)	24.0 (75.2)	18.0 (64.4)	37.5 (99.5)
Mean daily maximum °C (°F)	5.1 (41.2)	6.8 (44.2)	10.7 (51.3)	13.7 (56.7)	18.5 (65.3)	22.4 (72.3)	25.8 (78.4)	25.5 (77.9)	20.9 (69.6)	16.1 (61.0)	9.2 (48.6)	5.5 (41.9)	15.1 (59.2)
Daily mean °C (°F)	0.3 (32.5)	1.3 (34.3)	4.8 (40.6)	7.7 (45.9)	12.2 (54.0)	15.7 (60.3)	18.5 (65.3)	18.3 (64.9)	14.5 (58.1)	10.5 (50.9)	4.6 (40.3)	1.2 (34.2)	9.2 (48.6)
Mean daily minimum °C (°F)	−4.4 (24.1)	−4.1 (24.6)	−1.1 (30.0)	1.7 (35.1)	5.9 (42.6)	8.9 (48.0)	11.2 (52.2)	11.0 (51.8)	8.1 (46.6)	4.9 (40.8)	0.1 (32.2)	−3.1 (26.4)	3.3 (37.9)
Record low °C (°F)	−21.0 (−5.8)	−21.5 (−6.7)	−17.8 (0.0)	−11.1 (12.0)	−5.5 (22.1)	−2.0 (28.4)	0.5 (32.9)	−0.8 (30.6)	−6.0 (21.2)	−9.1 (15.6)	−15.8 (3.6)	−23.5 (−10.3)	−23.5 (−10.3)
Average precipitation mm (inches)	93.3 (3.67)	76.1 (3.00)	78.4 (3.09)	102.8 (4.05)	96.2 (3.79)	76.2 (3.00)	56.2 (2.21)	61.3 (2.41)	96.4 (3.80)	129.6 (5.10)	120.2 (4.73)	110.3 (4.34)	1,097 (43.19)
Average precipitation days (≥ 1.0 mm)	8.4	7.0	8.0	9.2	10.5	8.0	5.7	6.5	7.0	9.3	8.8	9.1	97.4
Source: Meteociel

== Population ==
Historical population
Year	Pop.	±% p.a.
1968	515	—
1975	535	+0.55%
1982	465	−1.98%
1990	408	−1.62%
1999	438	+0.79%
2007	448	+0.28%
2012	477	+1.26%
2017	458	−0.81%
2023	468	+0.36%
Source: INSEE

== See also ==
- Communes of the Hautes-Alpes department
