= Renaudot =

Renaudot may refer to:

- Eusèbe Renaudot (1646–1720), French theologian and expert on Eastern languages
- Gabrielle Renaudot Flammarion (1867–1962), French astronomer
- Théophraste Renaudot (1586–1653), French physician, medical author, and founder of a weekly newspaper
- Renaudot (crater), Martian impact crater
- Prix Renaudot (Renaudot Prize), a French literary award
