= Tungate =

Tungate is a surname. Notable people with the surname include:

- Mark Tungate, British writer
- Rohan Tungate (born 1990), Australian speedway rider
