= Théophraste Renaudot =

French physician, philanthropist, and journalist

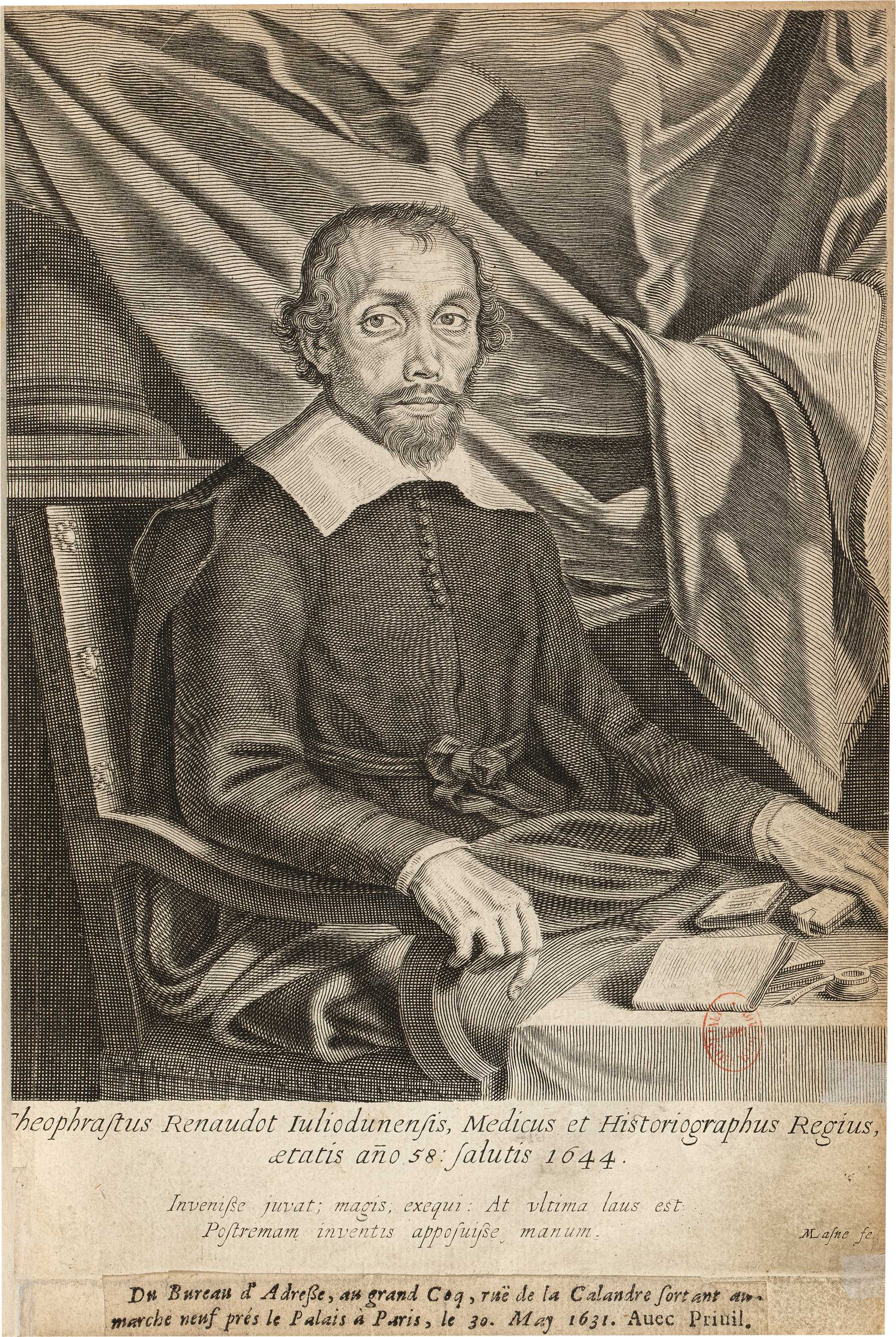
Renaudot

Théophraste Renaudot (French pronunciation: [teɔfʁast ʁənodo]; December 1586 – 25 October 1653) was a French physician, philanthropist, and journalist.

Born in Loudun, Renaudot received a doctorate of medicine from the University of Montpellier in 1606. He returned to Loudon where he met Cardinal Richelieu and Père Joseph. In the 1610s, Richelieu became more powerful and in 1612 he summoned Renaudot to Paris, partly because of his medical reputation, but more because of his philanthropy. Renaudot, born a Protestant, converted to Catholicism. He became the physician and councillor to Louis XIII.

As part of his duties, Renaudot was asked to organize a scheme of public assistance. Many difficulties were put in his way, however, and he therefore returned until 1624 to Poitou, where Richelieu made him "commissary general of the poor." In 1630, now back in Paris, Renaudot opened the bureau d'adresse et de rencontre, where prospective employers and employees could find each other. With the support of Richelieu, he established the first weekly newspaper in France, La Gazette, in 1631. Starting in 1633, he organized weekly public conferences on subjects of interest and published the proceedings; the conferences were discontinued in 1642, when Richelieu died. About 240 conference proceedings were translated into English and published in London in 1664 and 1665.

Renaudot opened the mont-de-piété, the first pawnshop in Paris, in 1637. Appointed "General Overseer of the Poor" by Richelieu, he initiated a system of free medical consultations for the poor (1640). In 1642 he published a self-diagnostic handbook, the first treatise on diagnosis in France. Later he established a free dispensary despite opposition from the medical faculty in Paris. The faculty refused to accept the new medicaments proposed by this "heretic", restricting themselves to the old prescriptions of bloodletting and purgation.

After the deaths of his benefactors, Richelieu and Louis XIII, Renaudot lost his permission to practice medicine in Paris, due to the opposition of Guy Patin and other academic physicians. The parlement ordered him to return the letters patent for the establishment of his bureau and his mont-de-piété. Cardinal Mazarin made Renaudot Historiographer Royal to the new king, Louis XIV (Latin: Historiographus Regius) in 1646, with printing presses at Saint-Germain-des-Prés.

Renaudot died in Paris, in 1653. His sons Isaac and Eusèbe, who were awarded doctorates after some delay, carried on their father's work and continued to promote the appropriate uses of medicines.

Mark Tungate in 2007 termed him the "first French journalist" and the "inventor of the personal ad".

== See also ==
- Prix Renaudot, a literary award named after him
- Eusèbe Renaudot, his grandson
