= Nicolas Fallet =

French playwright and journalist

Nicolas Fallet (10 September 1746, in Langres – 22 December 1801, in Paris) was an 18th-century French playwright and journalist.

== Biography ==
The son of a hatter, Fallet wrote quite a number of forgotten items, some of which were not without merit.

The tragedy Tibère, in which Fallet altered the nature of his hero by trying to make him less odious than he actually was, had only ten performances. However, it has been parodied as if it had been a great success.

Mathieu ou les Deux Soupers was no more successful. After being reduced to two acts, the play was renamed Les Deux Tuteurs and obtained some success.

Fallet submitted many articles to the Dictionnaire universel, historique et critique des mœurs, lois, usages et coutumes civiles, published in 1772, 4 vol. in-8°. He collaborated with the Gazette de France, then the Journal de Paris, and was a very committed supporter of the Almanach des Muses. He also contributed to the Dictionnaire historique et critique des mœurs, lois, usages et coutumes civiles, 1772, 4 vol. in-8°

== Works ==
- 1782: Tibère et Sérénus
- 1783: Mathieu ou les Deux Soupers, comedy in three acts and in prose mingled with ariettes, music by Nicolas Dalayrac created 11 October in front of the Court at Château de Fontainebleau then given 29 December 1783 at the Opéra-Comique (salle Favart)
- 1784: Les Deux Tuteurs, comedy in two acts and in prose, mingled with ariettes, (il s'agit de la précédente réduite à deux actes), music by Nicolas Dalayrac, created 8 May 1784 at the Opéra-Comique (salle Favart)
- 1786: Les Fausses Nouvelles
- 1788: Alphée et Zarine
- 1790: Les Noces cauchoises.

== Sources ==
- Antoine-Vincent Arnault, Antoine Jay, Étienne de Jouy, J. Norvins, Biographie nouvelle des contemporains, t. 7, Paris, Librairie historique, 1822, (p. 21).
