= La Gazette =

French daily newspaper (1631–1915)

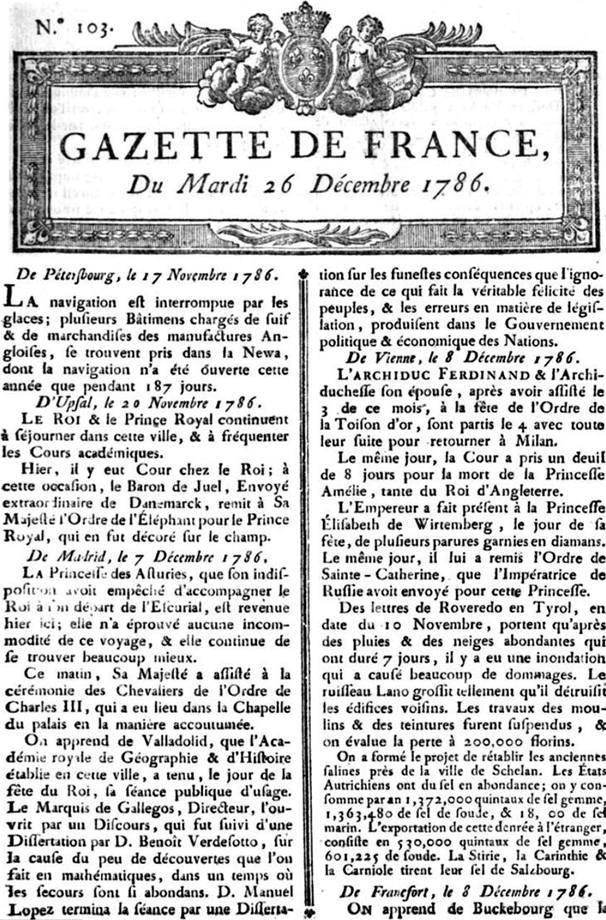
- Front page of La Gazette, 26 December 1786
- Type: Daily newspaper
- Format: Broadsheet
- Founder: Théophraste Renaudot
- Founded: 30 May 1631
- Ceased publication: 1915
- Political alignment: Legitimism, Reactionary
- Language: French
- Headquarters: Paris, France

La Gazette (French pronunciation: [la ɡazɛt]), originally Gazette de France, was the first weekly magazine published in France. It was founded by Théophraste Renaudot and published its first edition on 30 May 1631. It progressively became the mouthpiece of one royalist faction, the Legitimists. With the rise of modern news media and specialized and localized newspapers throughout the country in the early 20th century, La Gazette was finally discontinued in 1915.

== During the Ancien Régime ==
Before the advent of the printed Gazette, reports on current events usually circulated as hand-written papers (nouvelles à la main). La Gazette quickly became the center of France for the dissemination of news, and thus an excellent means for controlling the flow of information in a highly centralized state. Cardinal Richelieu and Louis XIII were frequent contributors, and until the revolution the magazine was frequently read by the nobility and aristocracy.

Among the early members of the committee supervising La Gazette were Pierre d'Hozier, Vincent Voiture, Guillaume Bautru, and Gauthier de Costes.

La Gazette had for objective to inform its readers on events from the noble court and abroad. It was mostly focused on political and diplomatic affairs. In 1762, its name became Gazette de France, with the sub title Organe officiel du Government royal (Official organ of the royal Government). The magazine was always one of the most expensive in Paris. In 1787, Charles-Joseph Panckouke already proprietary of the Mercure de France and the Moniteur universel—which he had just founded—rented the magazine.

== During the Revolution ==
La Gazette remained silent about the birth of the French Revolution, and did not even mention the storming of the Bastille on 14 July 1789, limiting itself to government acts. For the satisfaction of his customers, Charles-Joseph Panckouke published a supplement, Le Gazettin (little Gazette), that gave its readers summaries of debates at the National Constituent Assembly. In 1791, the ministry of foreign affairs, who owned La Gazette, took it back. Nicolas Fallet was named director and it became a tribune for the Girondists. He was succeeded by Sébastien Roch Nicolas Chamfort. La Gazette became a daily magazine in 1792, 1 May. Following the execution of Louis XVI in 1793, 21 January, it was renamed Gazette nationale de France (National Gazette of France) The tone of its articles remained both very prudent and impartial.

== See also ==
- Ancien Régime in France
- Charles Maurras
- History of French newspapers
- List of the oldest newspapers

== Bibliography ==
- Jean Tulard, Jean-François Fayard, Alfred Fierro, Histoire et dictionnaire de la Révolution française 1789-1799, Éditions Robert Laffont, collection Bouquins, Paris, 1987. ISBN 2-7028-2076-X
