= Nicolas Ribonnier =

16th-century French architect

Nicolas Ribonnier (c. 1525 – 1605) was a 16th-century French architect.

== Biography ==
Ribonnier was probably from Langres but no documents were found to confirm it. A Jean Ribonnier priest of Heuilley-le-Grand has been found. If he was from his family, his Langrois origin would be fortified.

If he worked on the rood screen of the cathédrale Saint-Mammès de Langres, this implies that he lived in Langres around 1550. He is quoted as godfather in an act of the parish of Saint-Pierre de Langres, on 18 January 1560.

In a royal letter of 1564 registered at the Chamber of Accounts of Dijon, it is written Nicolas Ribonier, maçon en nostre ville de Dijon is endowed with the office of visiteur des ouvrages des places fortes, villes et chasteaulx de notre pays de Bourgogne, a position vacant following the death of Jean de Vaulx.

Between 1560 and 1605, his name appears several times in the inventory of the municipal archives of Langres. He was not a member of the City Body, but before 1572 he was a member of the Confrérie du Saint-Sacrement. He was also a member of the brotherhood of Saint-Pierre and Saint-Paul in 1604. It is in the register of this brotherhood that we learn the year of his death: 1605.

- in 1588, he traced the boulevard de Longe-Porte,
- in December 1590, he was paid for work done at Porte Neufve,
- In March 1591, he made a commitment to the mayor and aldermen to build a drawbridge at the Market gate and to dig a ditch to avoid surprises,
- in October, he fixed the Moulins' gate,
- In 1594, he rebuilt a wall between the gate of Longe-Porte and the Saint-Gengoul tower, and built a half-moon platform behind the Saint-Ferjeux tower,
- in 1596, he repaired the entire city walls,
- In 1595/1596, he and Joseph Boillot were charged with demolishing the castle of Montsaugeon which had been used to threaten Langres.

He married Jeanne de Voisines and had seven children. His wife belonged to a well-established family in Langres. We know a Jean de Voisines, secretary of the bishopric, then canon from 1555 to 1563. In 1563, a Nicolas de Voisines appears as a mason on a register of the brotherhood of Saint-Pierre and Saint-Paul. Another Jean de Voisines, master builder, commanded the artillery of the Langrois at the siege of Choiseul.

He is qualified as master general of the works of the Duchy of Burgundy in 1570, magister lathomus, master mason in 1587, master architect at the Court of Accounts of the Duchy of Burgundy in 1591, architect in 1593.

On May 16, 1593, the corporation of the masons of Langres, of which Nicolas Ribonnier was a member, modified its statutes, allowing it to become a nursery of architects.

Residing in Dijon in 1564, he also worked with Hugues Sambin at the Dijon courthouse. He made the porch of the Dijon courthouse which precedes the gabled facade.

In 1563, Gaspard de Saulx-Tavannes undertook to build a new castle within the walls of the old Château du Pailly located two leagues from Langres, while retaining the keep. Nicolas Ribonnier, qualified as architect of the Duchy of Burgundy, is considered as the probable architect of this new castle. The sculptors used to make the castle, were probably Italian sculptors who had been called by the cardinal de Givry.

After the construction of the Château du Pailly, Gaspard de Saulx asked Ribonnier in 1573 for plans to rebuild the Château de Sully. Gaspard du Saulx died shortly after designing the plans with his architect. They were executed by his wife, Françoise de La Baume-Montrevel. According to Jean de Saulx, viscount of Tavannes, the castle was finished in 1620, but only the main façade received a decoration.

In his thesis, Benoît Peaucelle wrote about the château de Pailly:

We have not been able to rigorously demonstrate that Nicolas Ribonnier was the architect, despite the intimate conviction that we have by dint of comparinf the Pailly style with the different contemporary regional and national styles. There is here an unknown designer who used his own style and only the name Ribonnier emerges in the history of Dijon and Langres. On the other hand, we have confirmed that Nicolas Ribonnier is the author of the Château de Sully and that he deserves, if only by the attribution of this one marvel, to belong to history.
