= Langres =

Subprefecture and commune in Grand Est, France

- Subprefecture and commune
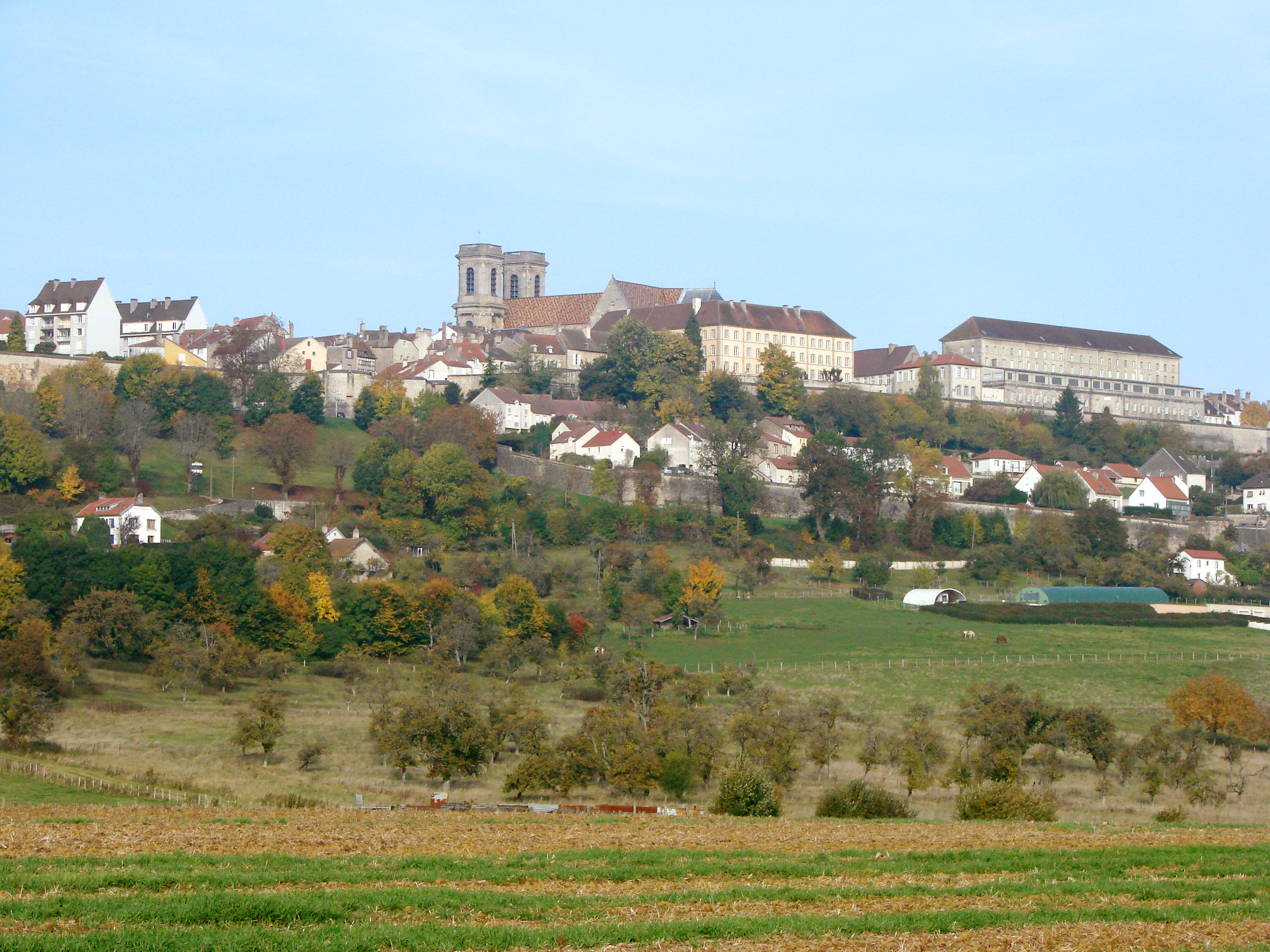
- View of Langres from the southeast

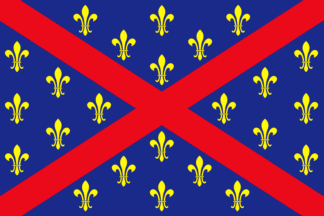
- Flag Coat of arms
- Location of Langres
- Location within France Location within Grand Est
- Coordinates: 47°51′48″N 5°20′02″E
- Country: France
- Region: Grand Est
- Department: Haute-Marne
- Arrondissement: Langres
- Canton: Langres
- Intercommunality: Grand Langres

Government
  - Mayor (2020–2026): Anne Cardinal
- Area^{1}: 22.33 km^{2} (8.62 sq mi)
- Elevation: 475 m (1,558 ft)
- Highest elevation: 475 m (1,558 ft)
- Lowest elevation: 327 m (1,073 ft)
- Population (2023): 7,421
  - Density: 332.3/km^{2} (860.7/sq mi)
- Time zone: UTC+01:00 (CET)
  - Summer (DST): UTC+02:00 (CEST)
- INSEE/Postal code: 52269 /52200
- ^{1} French Land Register data, which excludes lakes, ponds, glaciers > 1 km^{2} (0.386 sq mi or 247 acres) and river estuaries.

Langres (French pronunciation: [lɑ̃ɡʁ]) is a commune in northeastern France. It is a subprefecture of the department of Haute-Marne, in the region of Grand Est.

== History ==
As the capital of the Romanized Gallic tribe known as the Lingones, it was called Andematunnum, then Lingones, and now Langres.

A hilltop town, Langres was built on a limestone promontory of the same name. This stronghold was originally occupied by the Lingones. At a later date the Romans fortified the town, which they called Andemantunum, located at a strategic crossroads of twelve Roman roads. The first-century Triumphal Gate and the many artefacts exhibited in the museums are remnants of the town's Gallo-Roman history. After the period of invasions, the town prospered in the Middle Ages, due in part to the growing political influence of its bishops. The diocese covered Champagne, the Duchy of Burgundy, and Franche-Comté, and the bishops obtained the right to coin money in the ninth century and to name the military governor of the city in 927. The Bishop of Langres was a duke and peer of France. The troubled 14th and 15th centuries caused the town to strengthen its defenses, which still give the old city its fortified character, and Langres entered a period of royal tutelage. The Renaissance, which returned prosperity to the town, saw the construction of numerous fine civil, religious and military buildings that still stand today. In the 19th century, a "Vauban" citadel was added.

== Main sights ==
Langres has a historic town center surrounded by defensive walls with a dozen towers and seven gates.

The cathedral of Saint-Mammès is a late 12th-century structure dedicated to Mammes of Caesarea, a 3rd-century martyr.

== Culture ==
Langres is home to producers of an AOC-protected cheese of the same name. It is a soft, pungent cow's milk cheese that is known for its rind, which is washed.

The town was long known for its cutlery industry. Didier Diderot, father of encyclopedist Denis, was a cutler.

A museum called the Denis Diderot House of Enlightenment opened in 2013. This museum, set up in a private mansion from the 16th and 18th centuries, is dedicated to the philosopher Denis Diderot.

== Housing ==
In August 2025, the Langres town hall announced the demolition of the Navarre building, better known as the Banane, for September 2025.

== Population ==
Historical population
Year	Pop.	±% p.a.
1968	11,001	—
1975	11,437	+0.56%
1982	10,468	−1.26%
1990	9,987	−0.59%
1999	9,586	−0.45%
2007	8,414	−1.62%
2012	7,905	−1.24%
2017	7,731	−0.44%
2023	7,421	−0.68%
Source: INSEE

== Notable people ==
Langres was the birthplace of:

- Nicolas Ribonnier (ca.1525–1605), Renaissance architect
- Jeanne Mance (1606–1673), the co-founder of Montreal
- Claude Gillot (1673–1722), painter
- Denis Diderot (1713–1784), the philosopher of the Age of Enlightenment, and the editor-in-chief of the Encyclopédie.
- Étienne Jean Bouchu (1714–1773), metallurgist and Encyclopédiste
- Nicolas Fallet (1746–1801), playwright and journalist
- Joseph-Philibert Girault de Prangey (1804–1892), photographer and draughtsman
- Jules Violle (1841–1923), physicist and inventor
- Guy Fréquelin (born 1945), rally driver
- Jean Tabourot, who went by the pen name Thoinot Arbeau and wrote Orchésographie, a book on dance and music.

== Climate ==
Located in the north-east quarter of France, Langres is under the influence of both an oceanic climate and a humid continental climate with no dry season. Winters are cold and snowy (33.4 days of snow per year on average) but interspersed with periods of light thaw and summers are mild and even pleasant with average maximum temperatures around 23 °C (73 °F).

Climate data for Langres, elevation 466 m (1,529 ft), (1991–2020 normals, extremes 1919–present)
Month	Jan	Feb	Mar	Apr	May	Jun	Jul	Aug	Sep	Oct	Nov	Dec	Year
Record high °C (°F)	14.5 (58.1)	20.4 (68.7)	24.6 (76.3)	26.3 (79.3)	31.8 (89.2)	35.7 (96.3)	38.8 (101.8)	37.6 (99.7)	33.8 (92.8)	29.2 (84.6)	21.1 (70.0)	15.5 (59.9)	38.8 (101.8)
Mean daily maximum °C (°F)	3.9 (39.0)	5.7 (42.3)	10.3 (50.5)	14.2 (57.6)	18.0 (64.4)	21.9 (71.4)	24.2 (75.6)	24.0 (75.2)	19.5 (67.1)	14.2 (57.6)	8.0 (46.4)	4.6 (40.3)	14.0 (57.2)
Daily mean °C (°F)	1.6 (34.9)	2.7 (36.9)	6.3 (43.3)	9.7 (49.5)	13.4 (56.1)	17.0 (62.6)	19.2 (66.6)	19.1 (66.4)	15.1 (59.2)	10.7 (51.3)	5.5 (41.9)	2.4 (36.3)	10.2 (50.4)
Mean daily minimum °C (°F)	−0.8 (30.6)	−0.3 (31.5)	2.4 (36.3)	5.1 (41.2)	8.8 (47.8)	12.1 (53.8)	14.1 (57.4)	14.2 (57.6)	10.6 (51.1)	7.3 (45.1)	2.9 (37.2)	0.1 (32.2)	6.4 (43.5)
Record low °C (°F)	−18.1 (−0.6)	−21.2 (−6.2)	−13.2 (8.2)	−6.6 (20.1)	−2.9 (26.8)	2.5 (36.5)	5.1 (41.2)	5.1 (41.2)	2.1 (35.8)	−4.5 (23.9)	−10.7 (12.7)	−16.4 (2.5)	−21.2 (−6.2)
Average precipitation mm (inches)	78.5 (3.09)	63.4 (2.50)	66.3 (2.61)	59.6 (2.35)	82.5 (3.25)	69.7 (2.74)	77.3 (3.04)	69.5 (2.74)	65.7 (2.59)	83.4 (3.28)	88.3 (3.48)	91.9 (3.62)	896.1 (35.28)
Average precipitation days (≥ 1.0 mm)	12.1	10.6	10.4	10.0	11.7	9.9	9.6	9.3	9.3	11.5	12.4	13.4	130.1
Average snowy days	7.6	6.9	5.4	3.2	0.3	0.0	0.0	0.0	0.0	0.3	3.5	6.2	33.4
Average relative humidity (%)	90	84	78	72	74	73	71	74	79	86	89	91	80.1
Mean monthly sunshine hours	57.2	87.1	146.5	180.5	199.4	219.2	234.2	222.5	175.3	113.2	62.3	50.2	1,747.4
Source 1: Meteociel
Source 2: Infoclimat.fr (humidity and snowy days, 1961–1990)

== International relations ==
Langres is twinned with:

- Beaconsfield, United Kingdom - since 1995
- Ellwangen, Germany - since 1964
- Abbiategrasso, Italy

== See also ==
- Bishopric of Langres
- The Langres war memorial has a sculpture by Georges Saupique

== Gallery ==
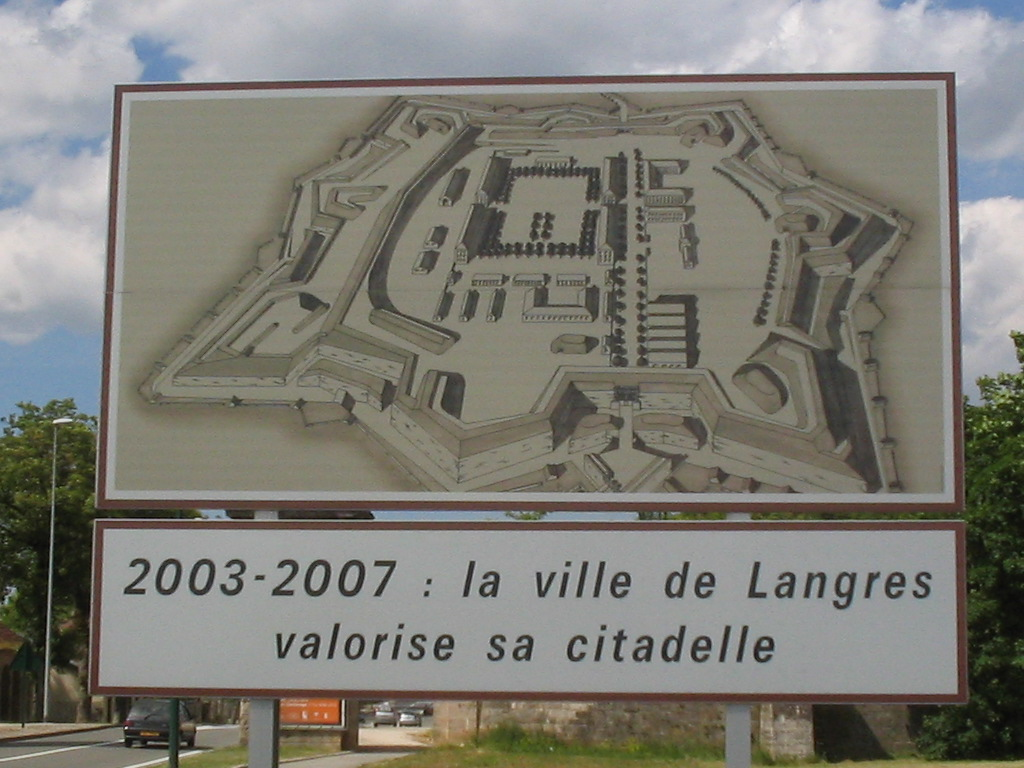
Road sign announcing improvements to the Citadel of Langres

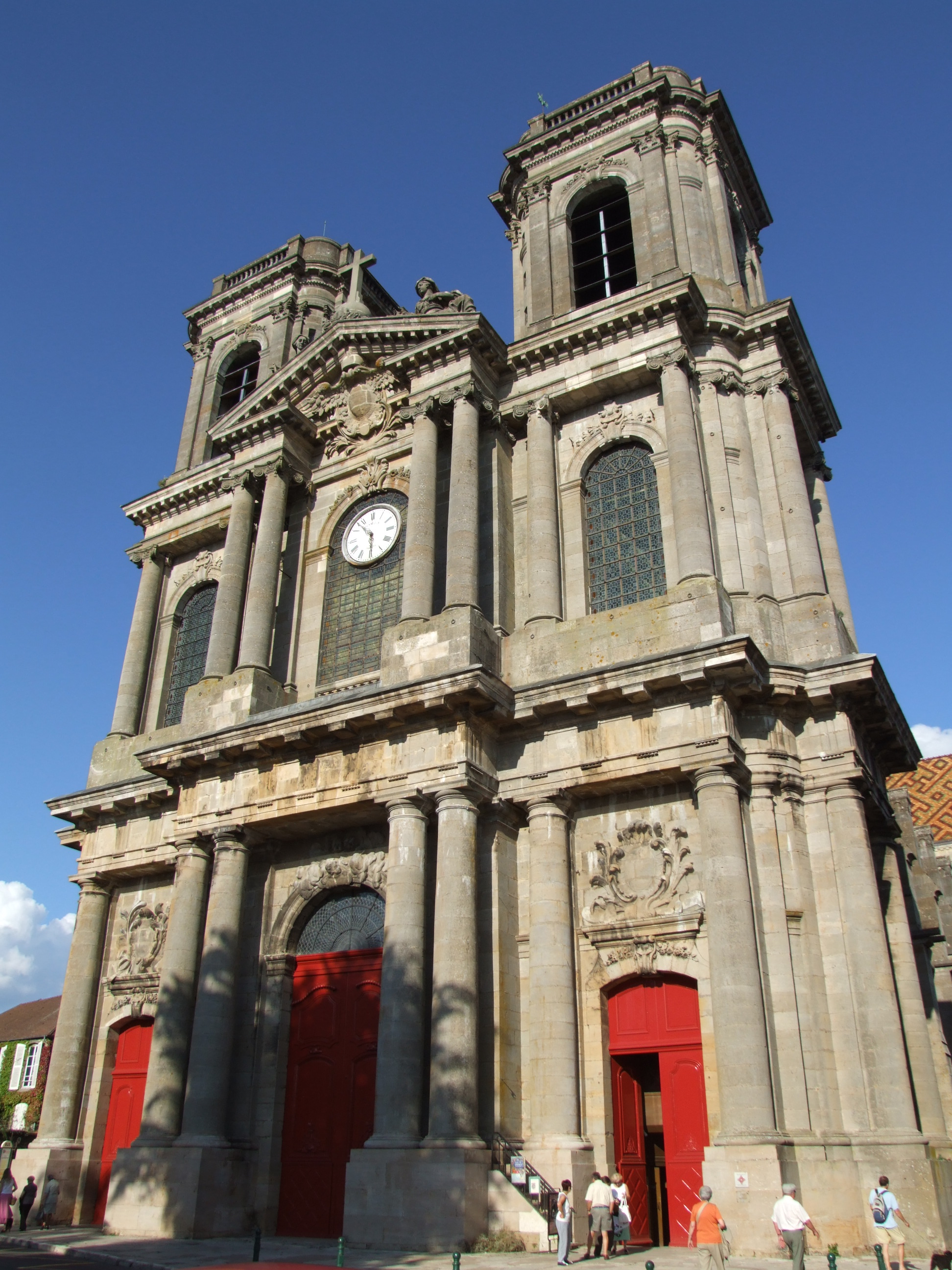
Saint-Mammès Cathedral

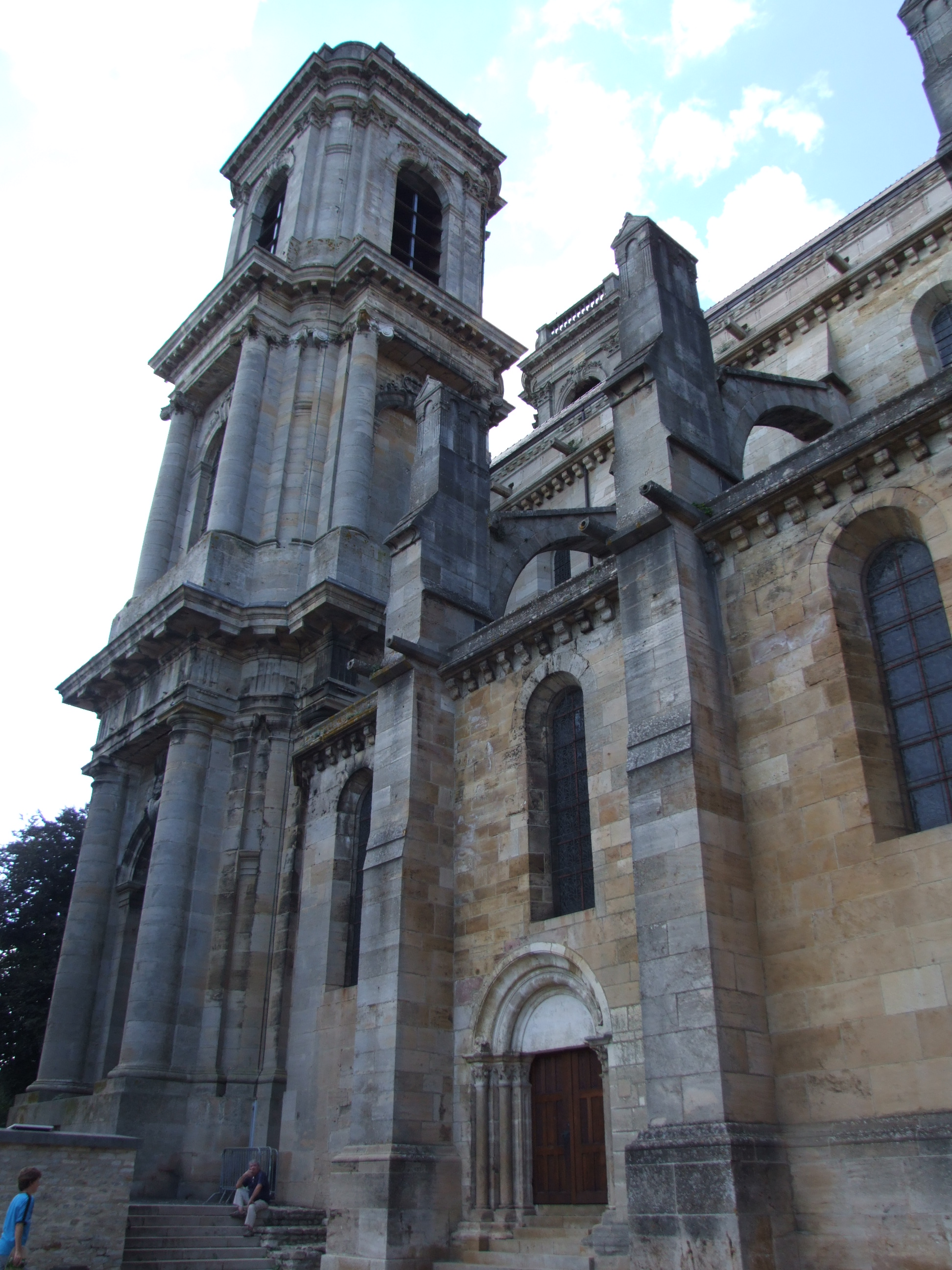
Saint-Mammès Cathedral

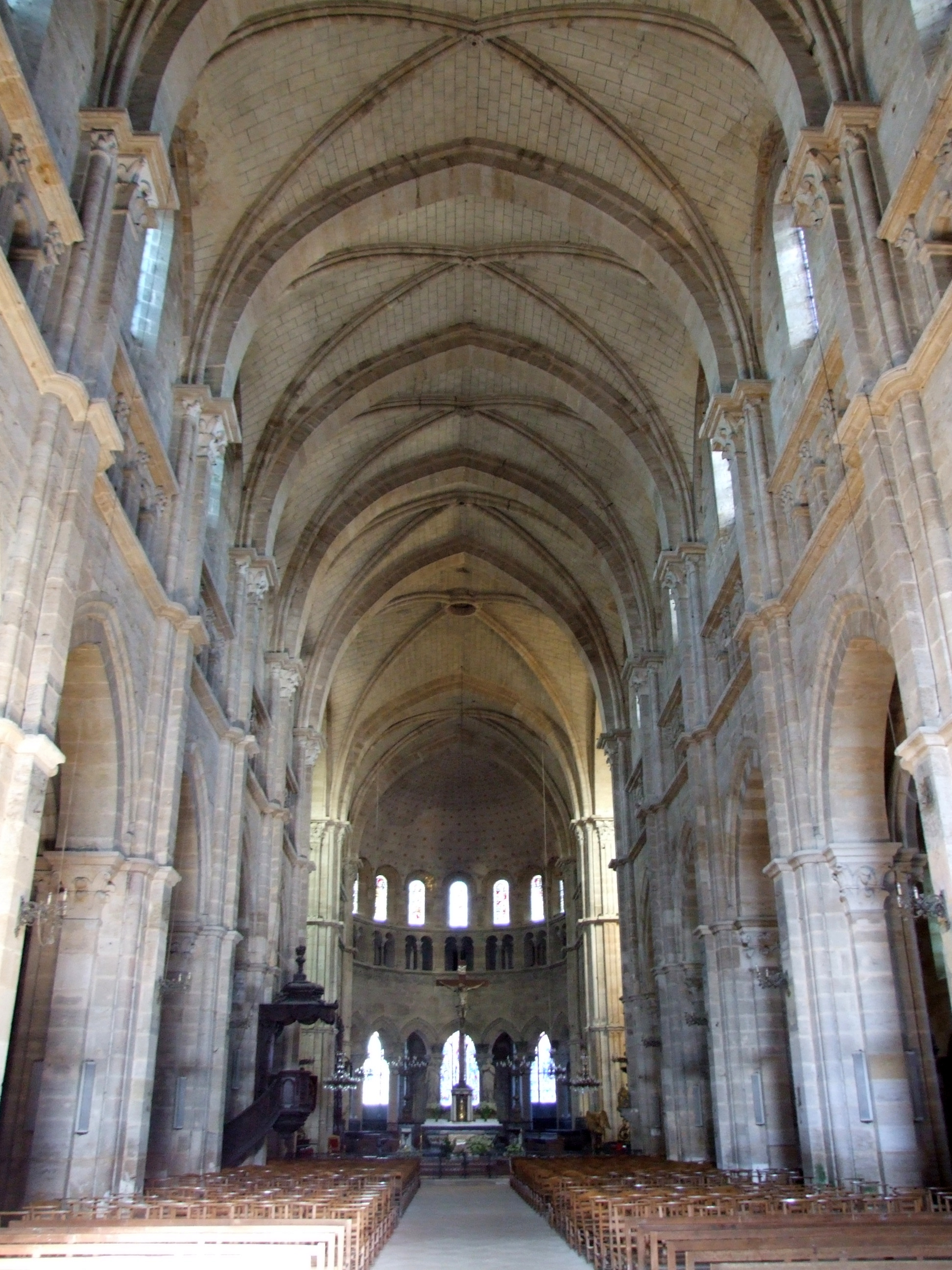
Saint-Mammès Cathedral

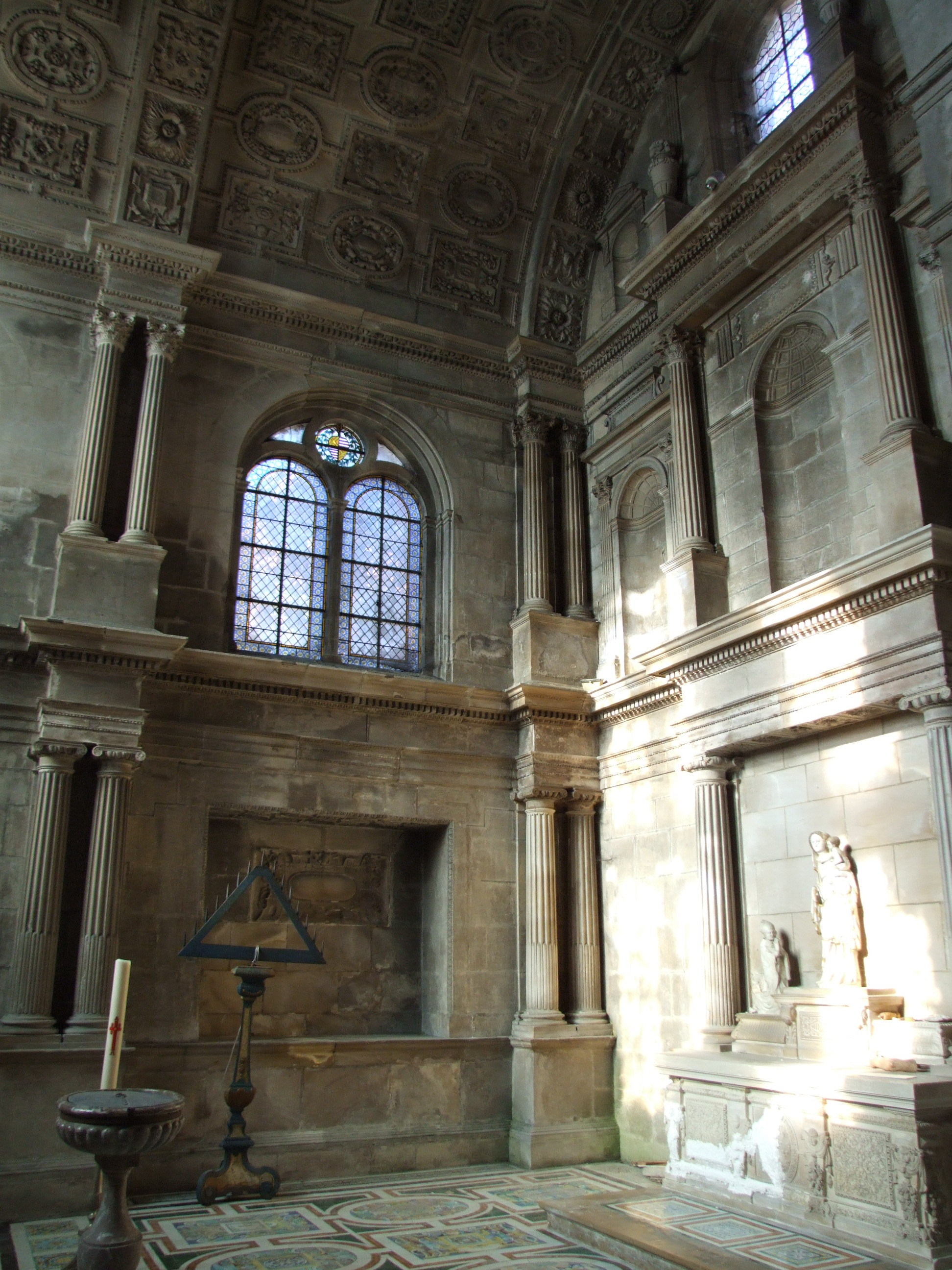
Saint-Mammès Cathedral

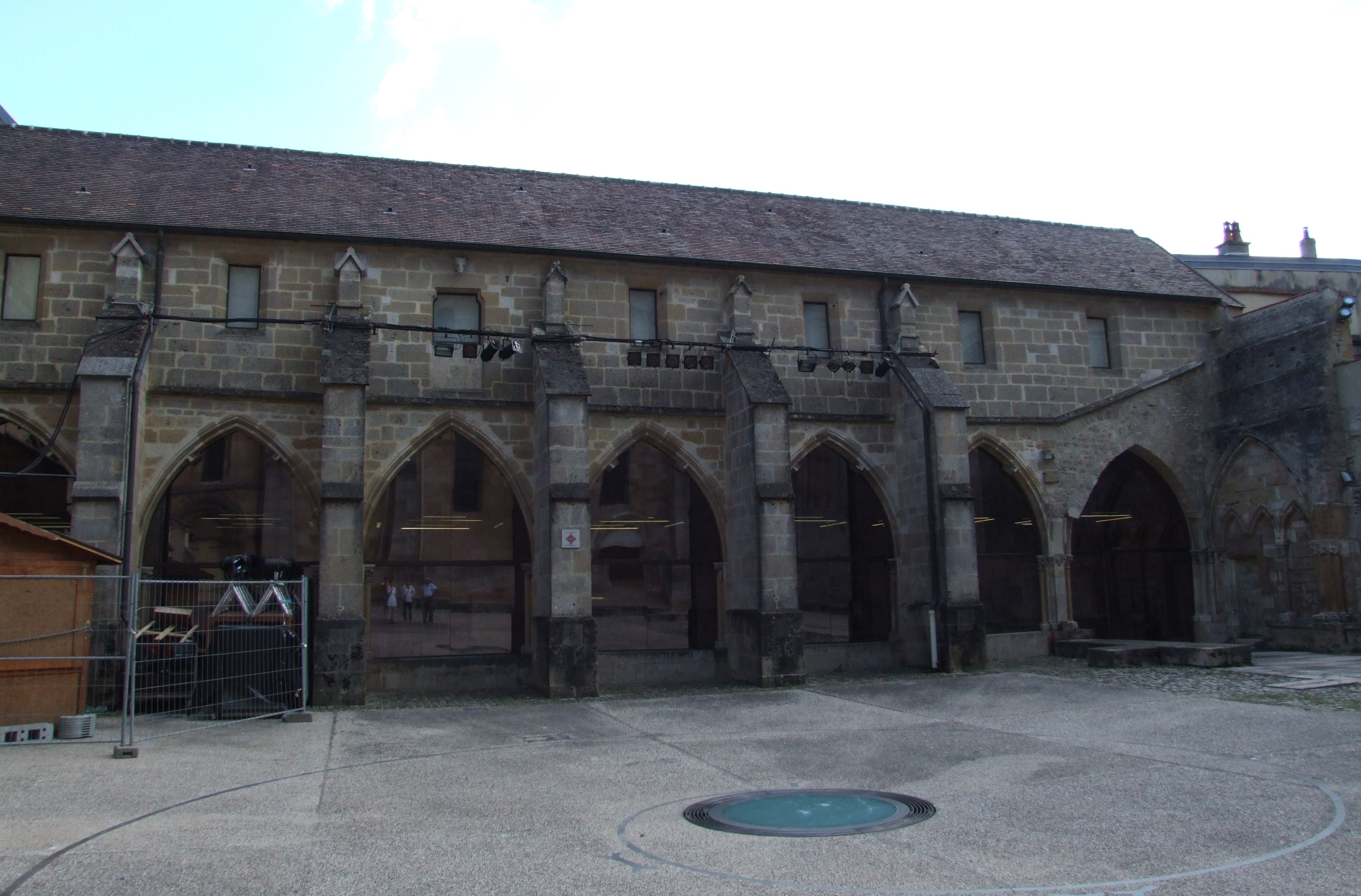
Saint-Mammès Cathedral Cloister

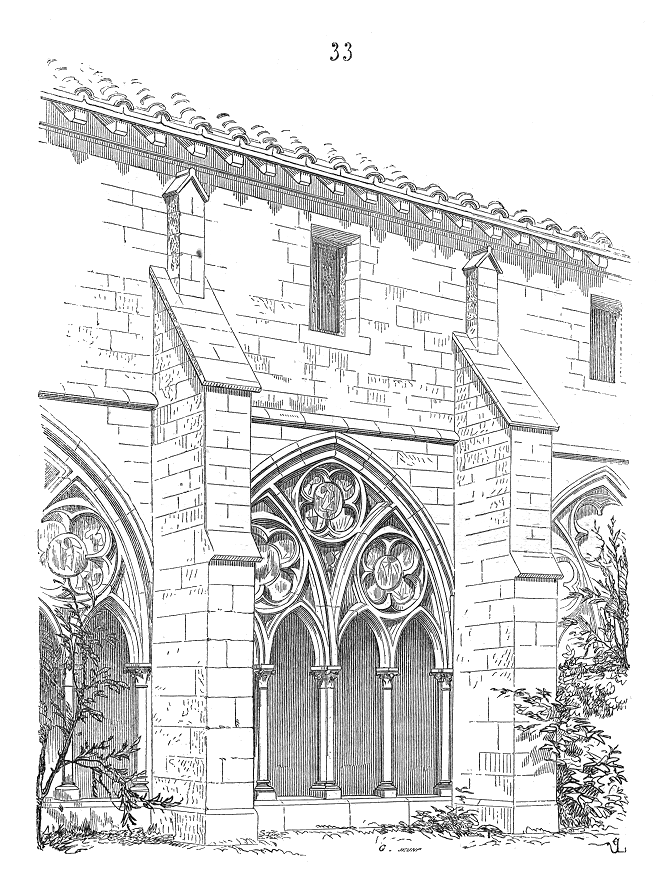
Saint-Mammès Cathedral Cloister

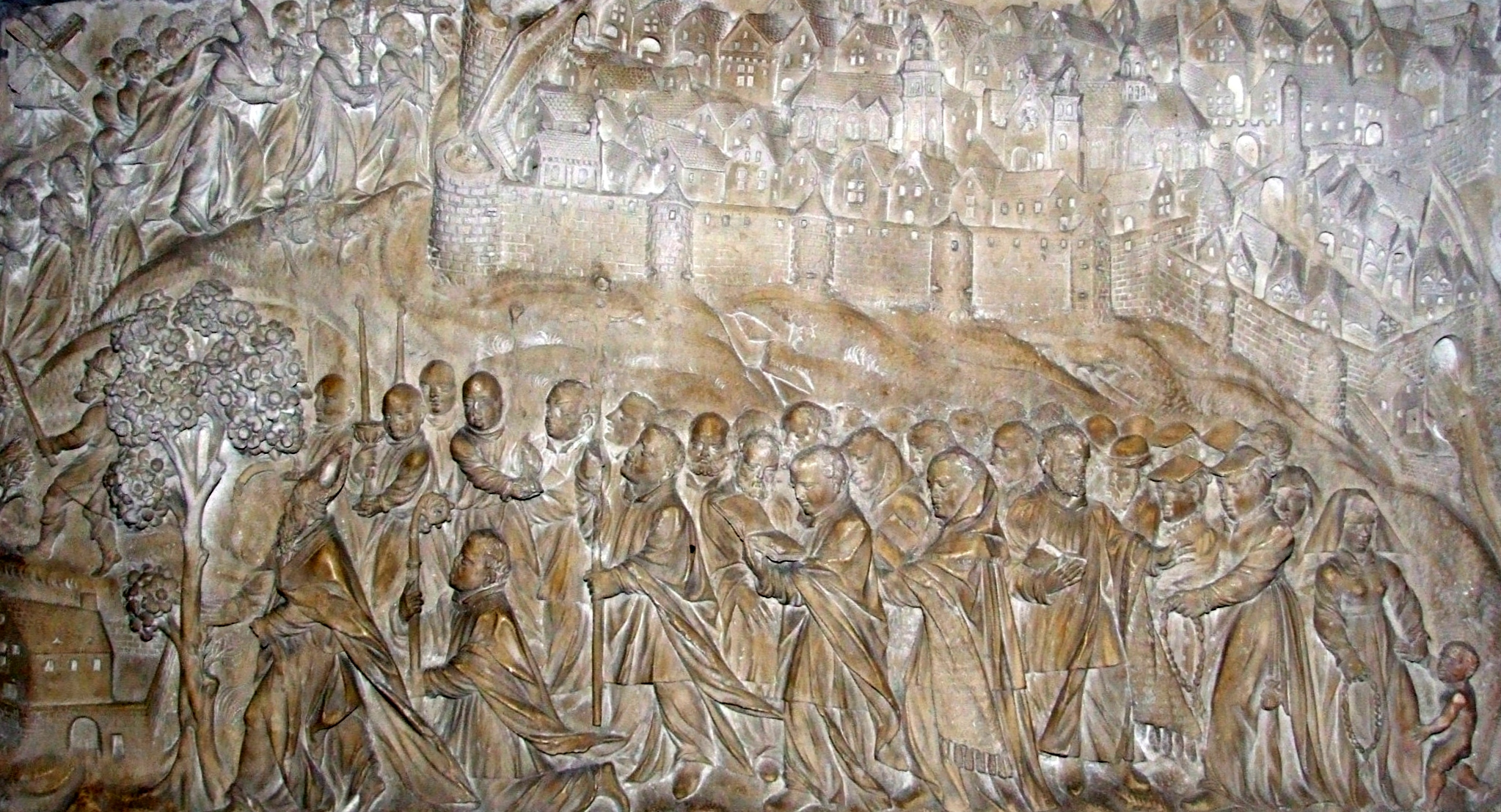
Bas relief at Saint-Mammès Cathedral

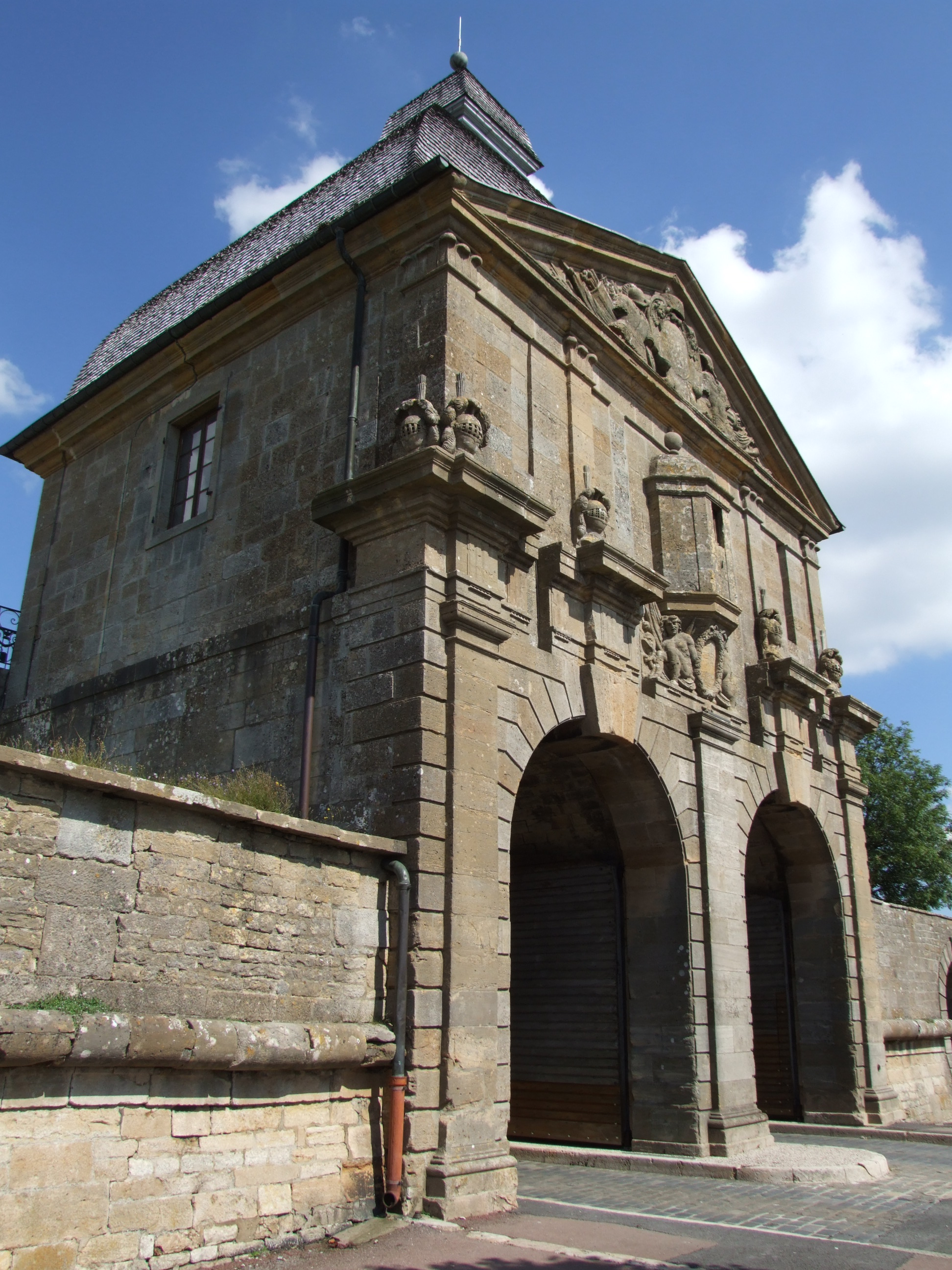
Moulins Gate

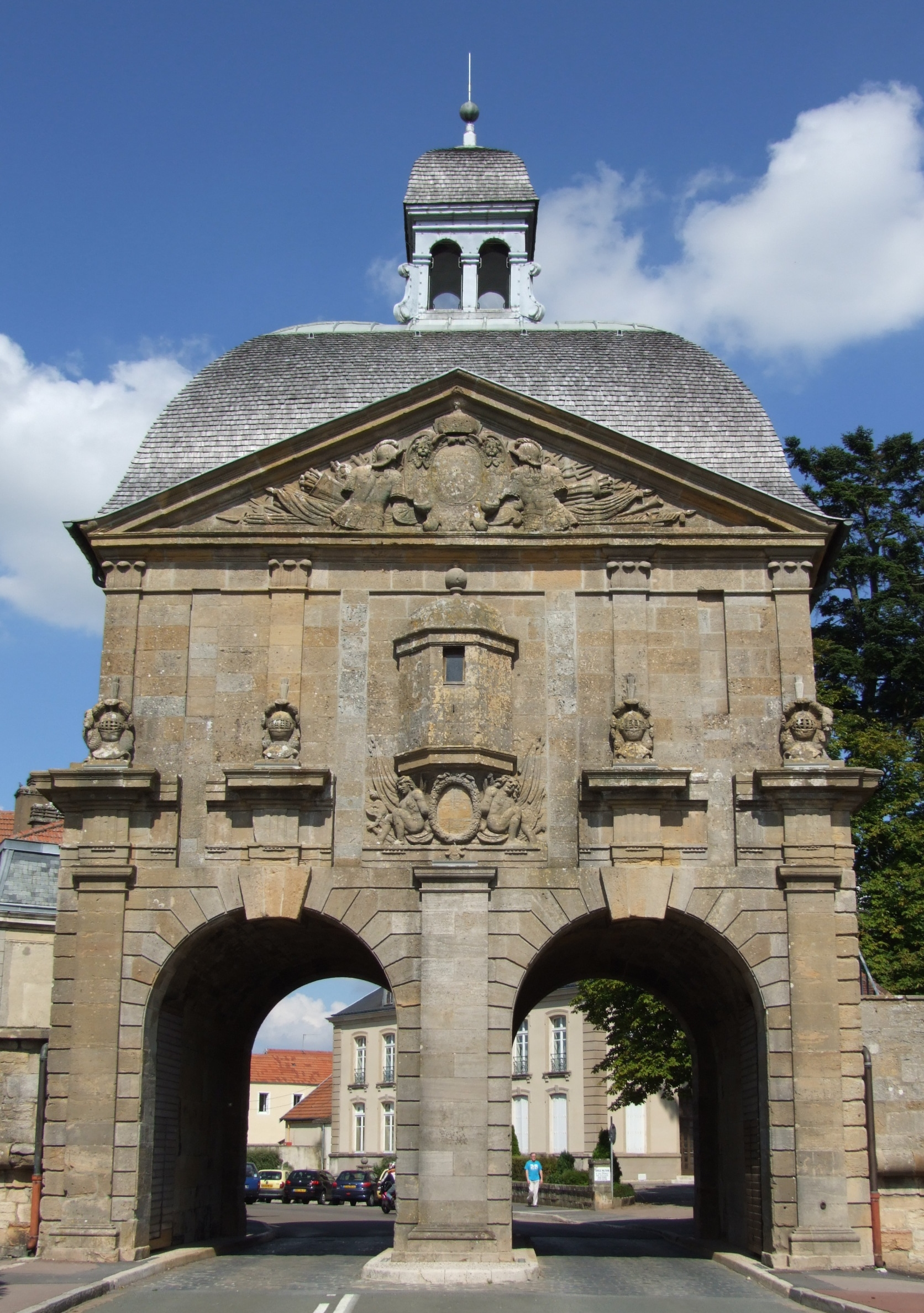
Moulins Gate

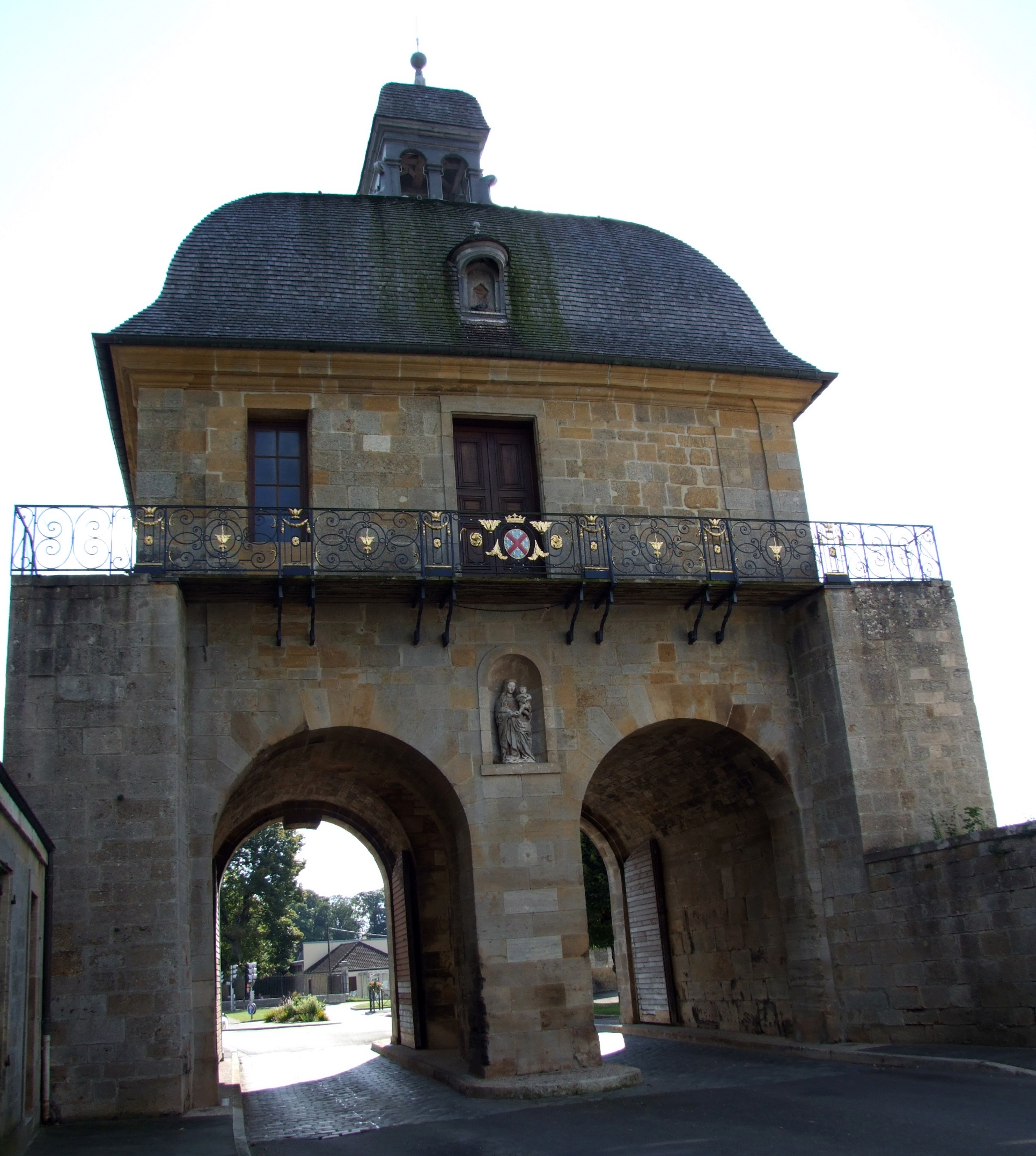
Moulins Gate

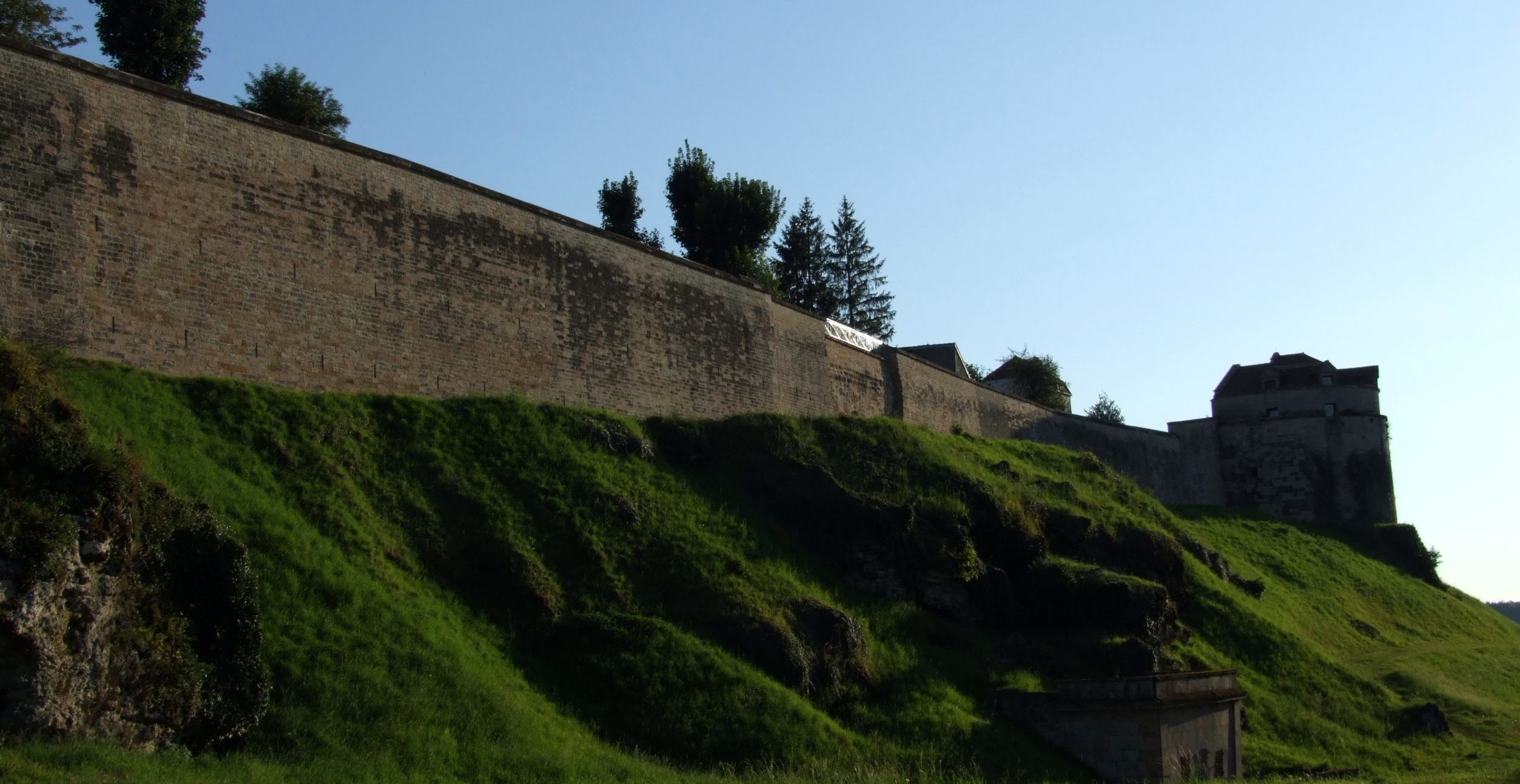
Ramparts of the Citadel

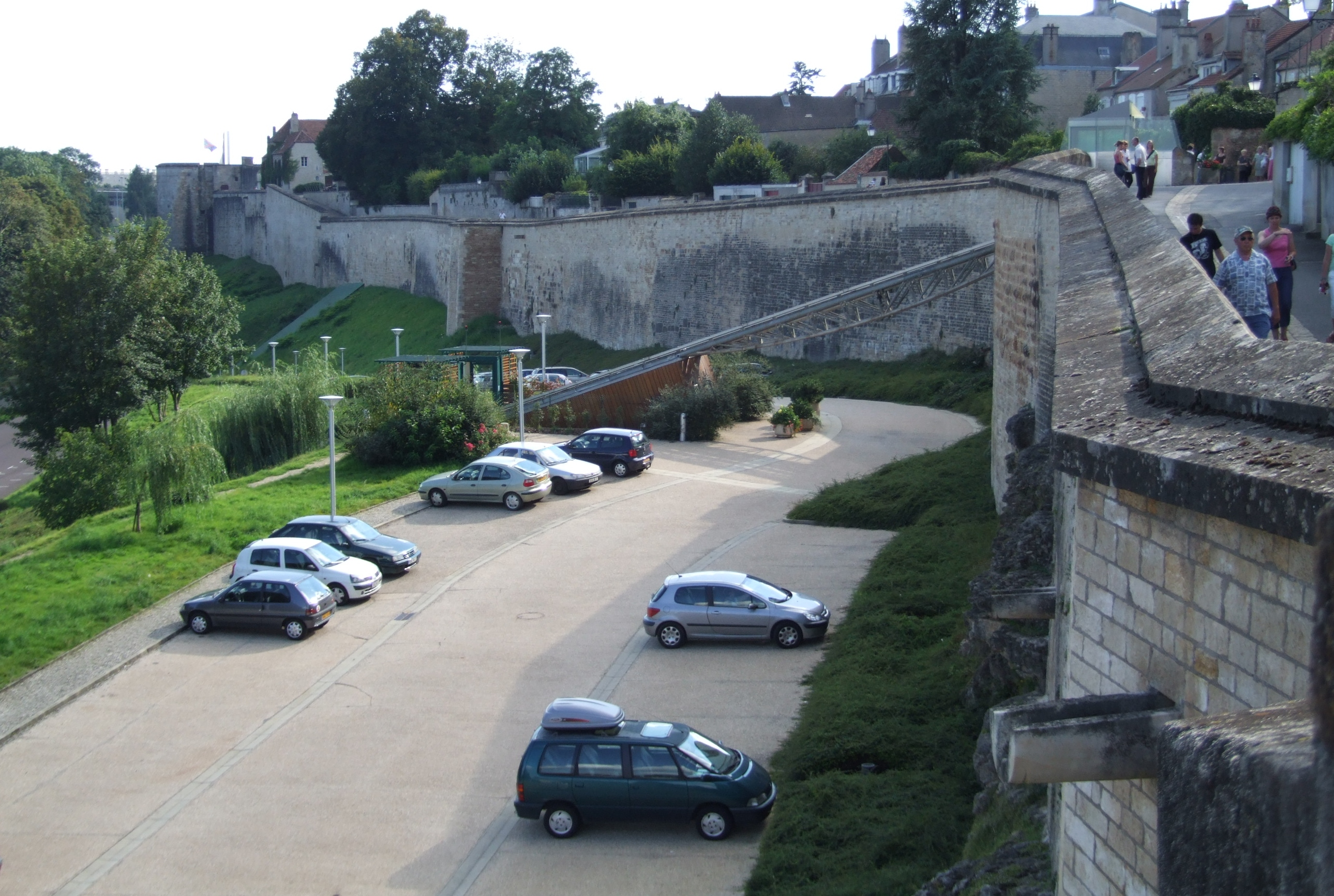
Ramparts and Funicular

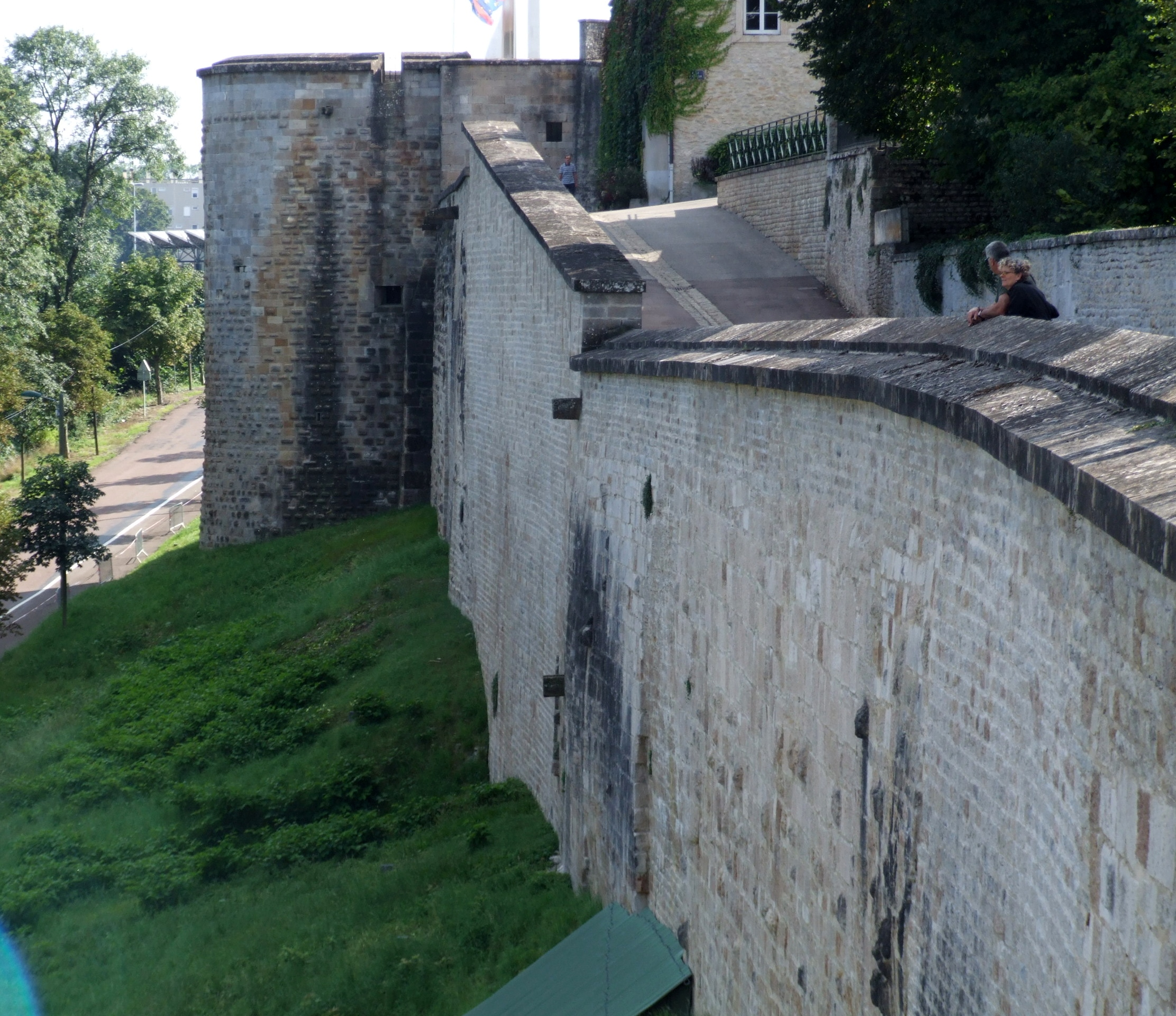
Saint-Ferjeux Tower

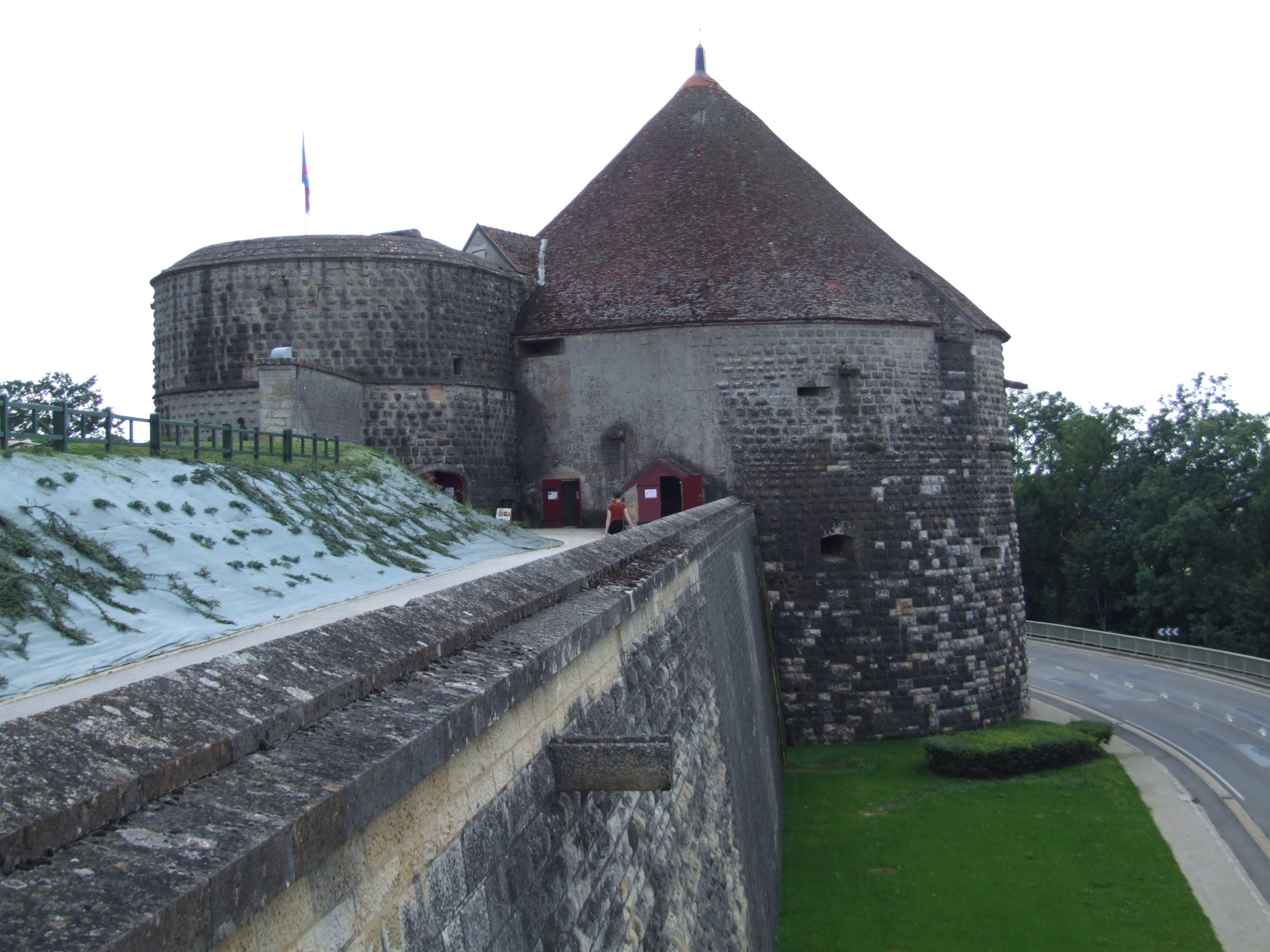
Navarre and d'Orval Tower

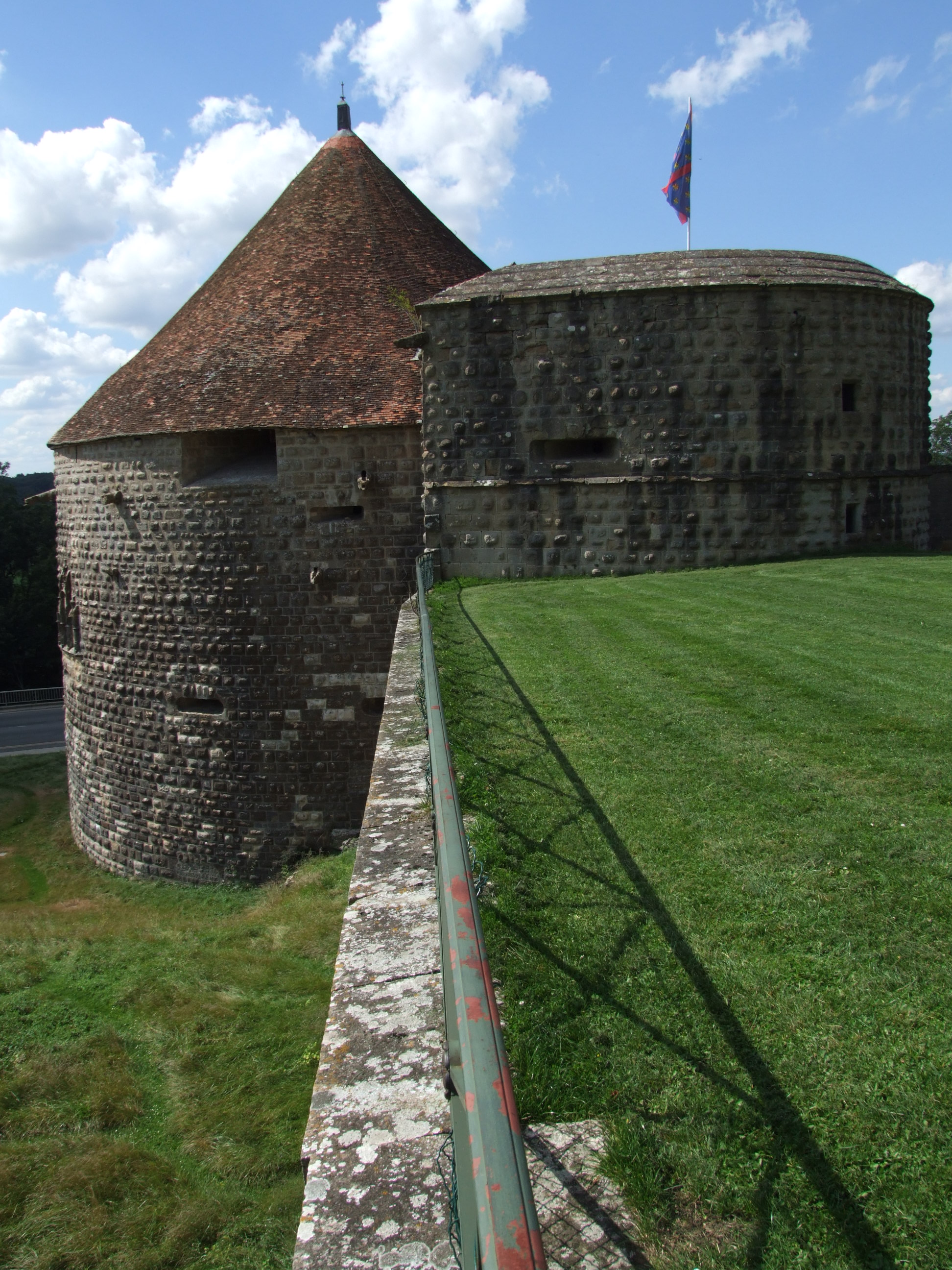
Navarre and d'Orval Tower

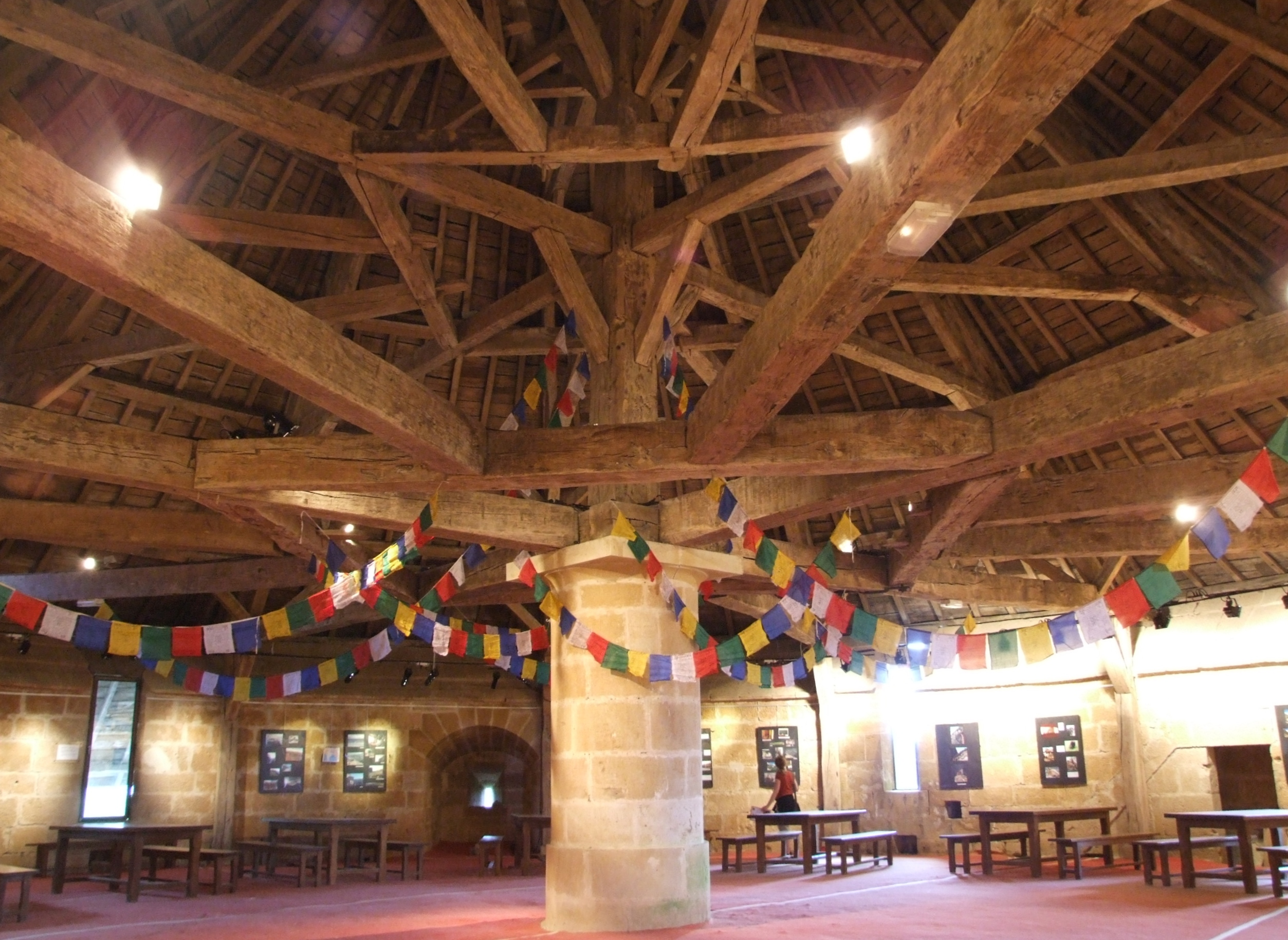
Navarre and d'Orval Tower ceiling framework

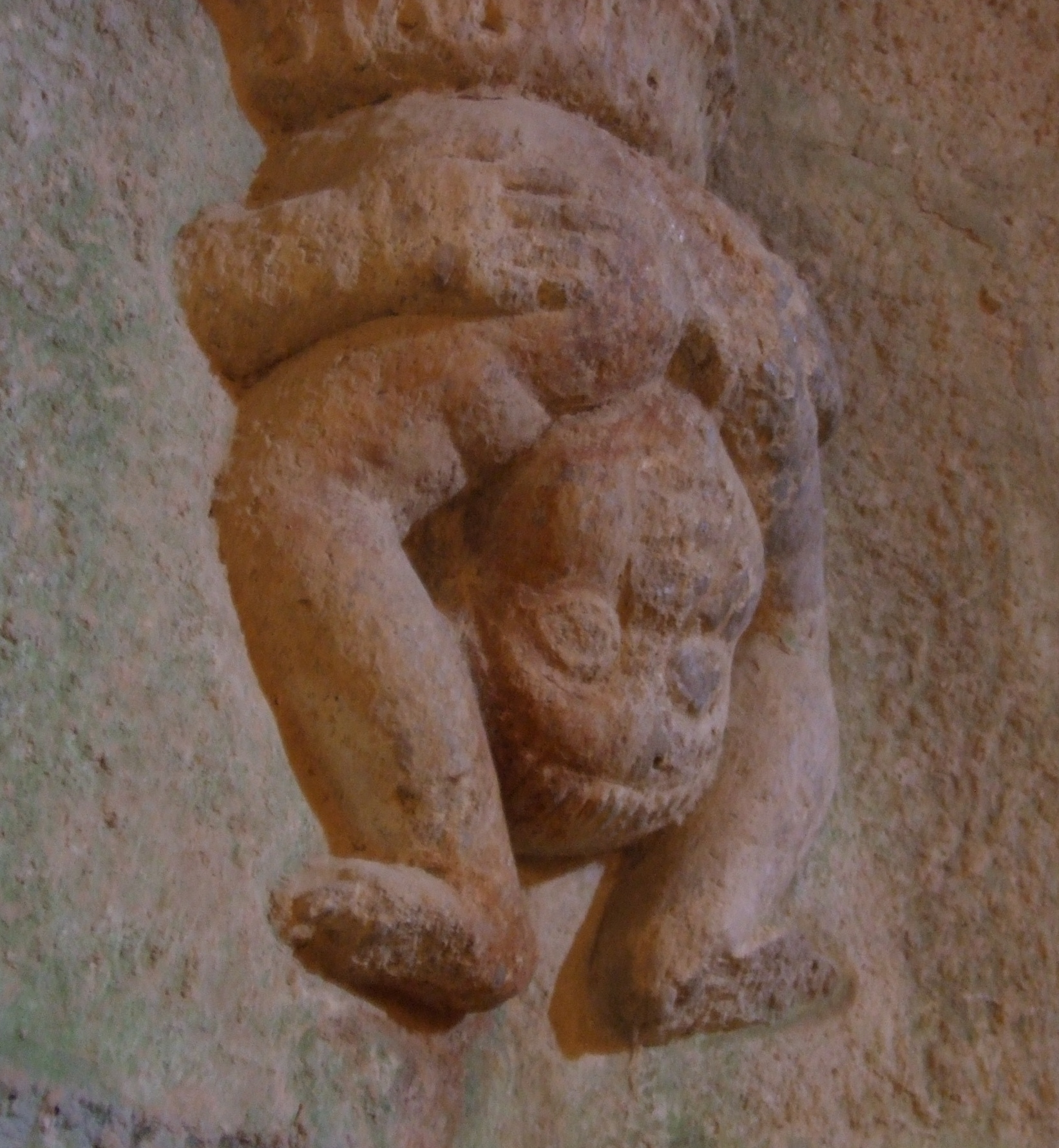
Navarre and d'Orval Tower torch holder

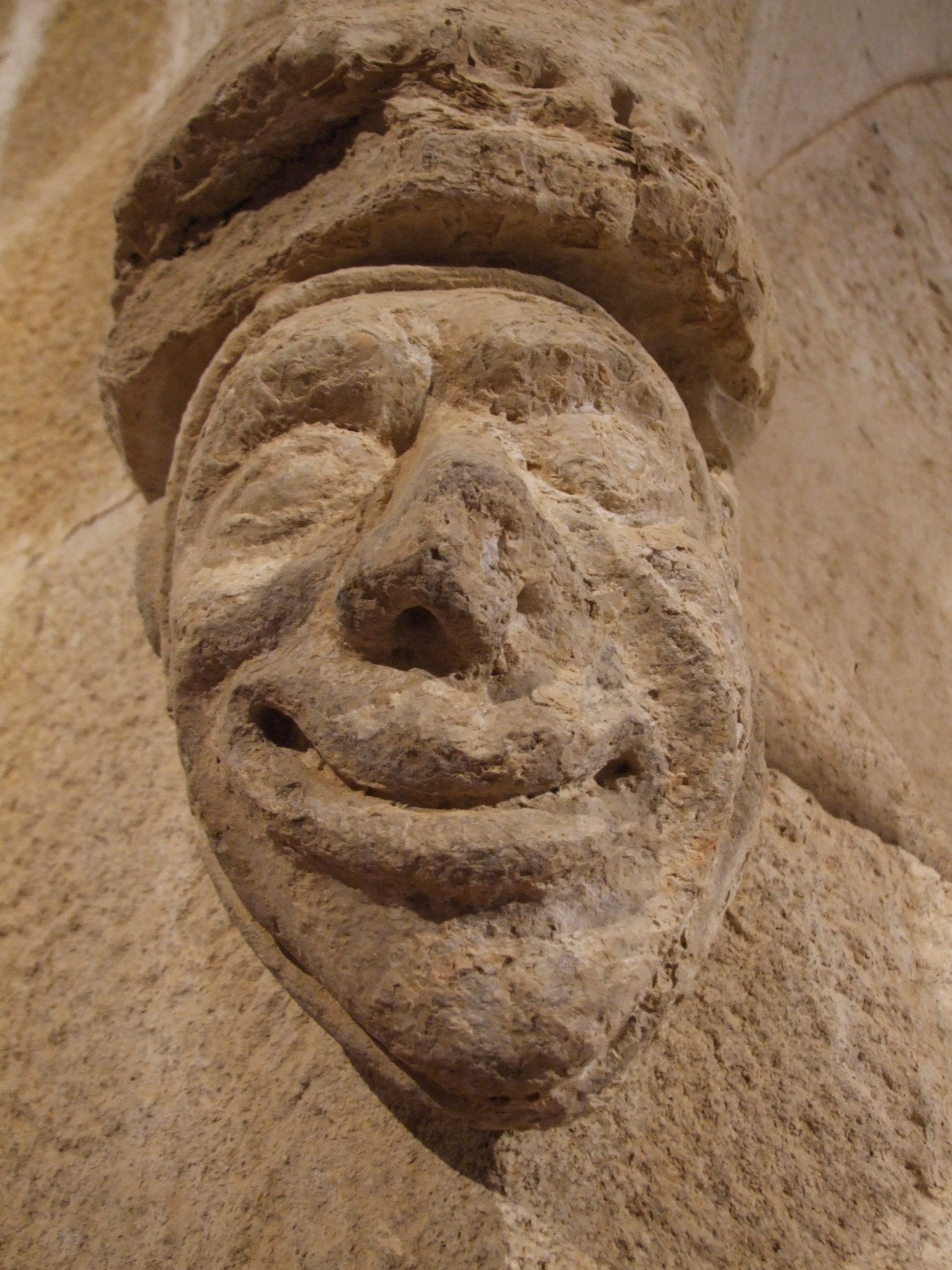
Navarre and d'Orval Tower torch holder

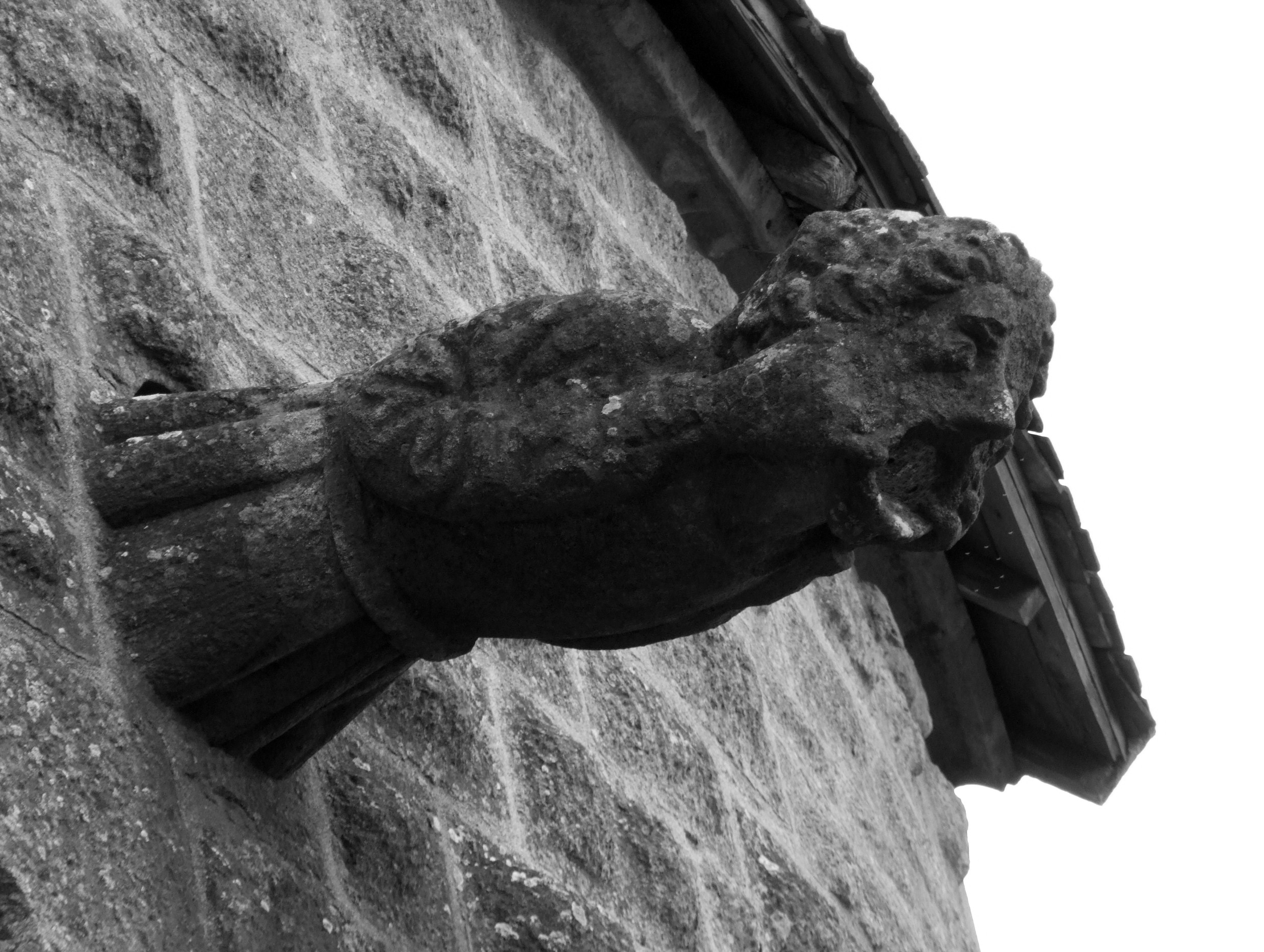
Navarre and d'Orval Tower gargoyle

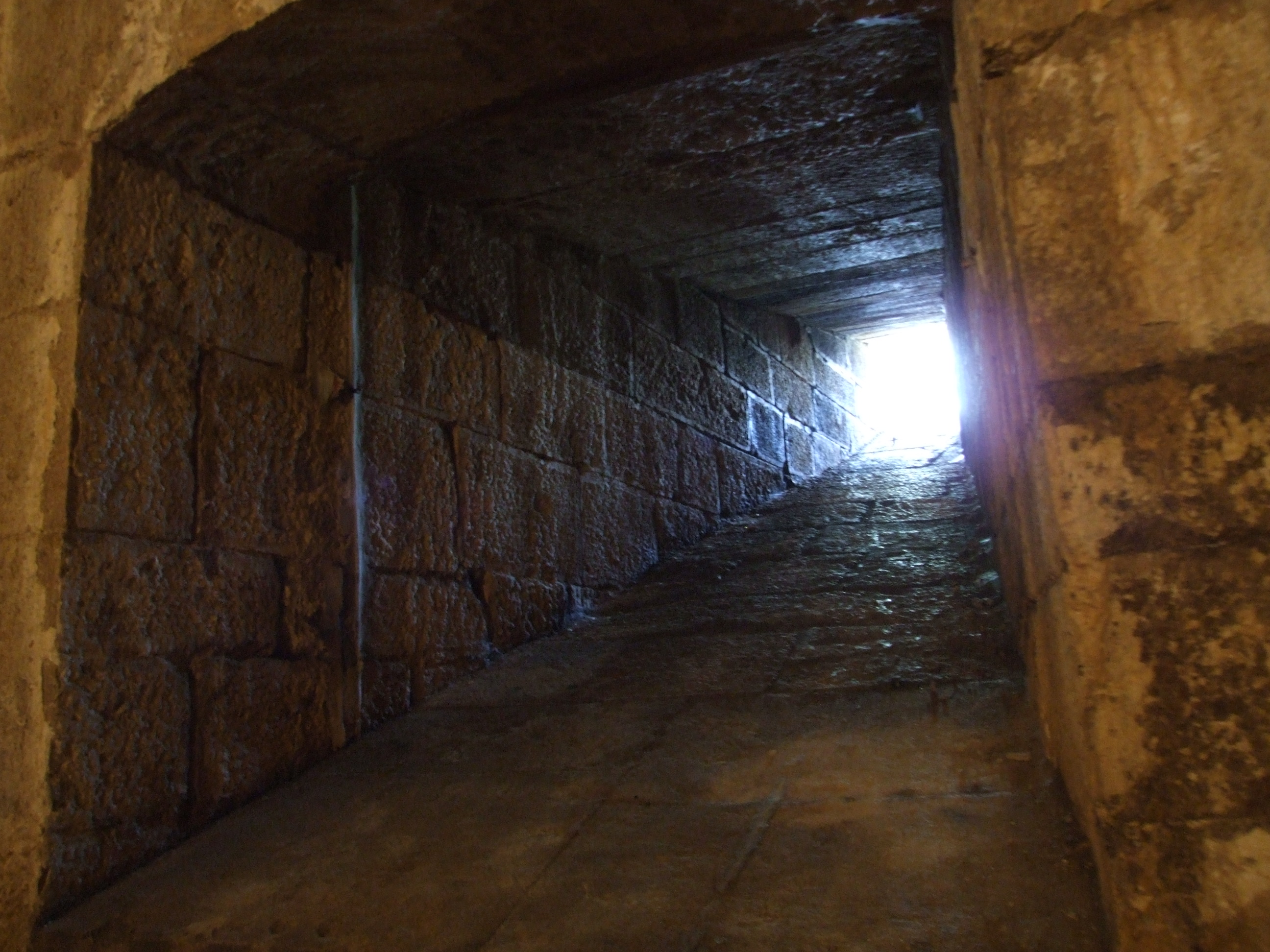
Navarre and d'Orval Tower

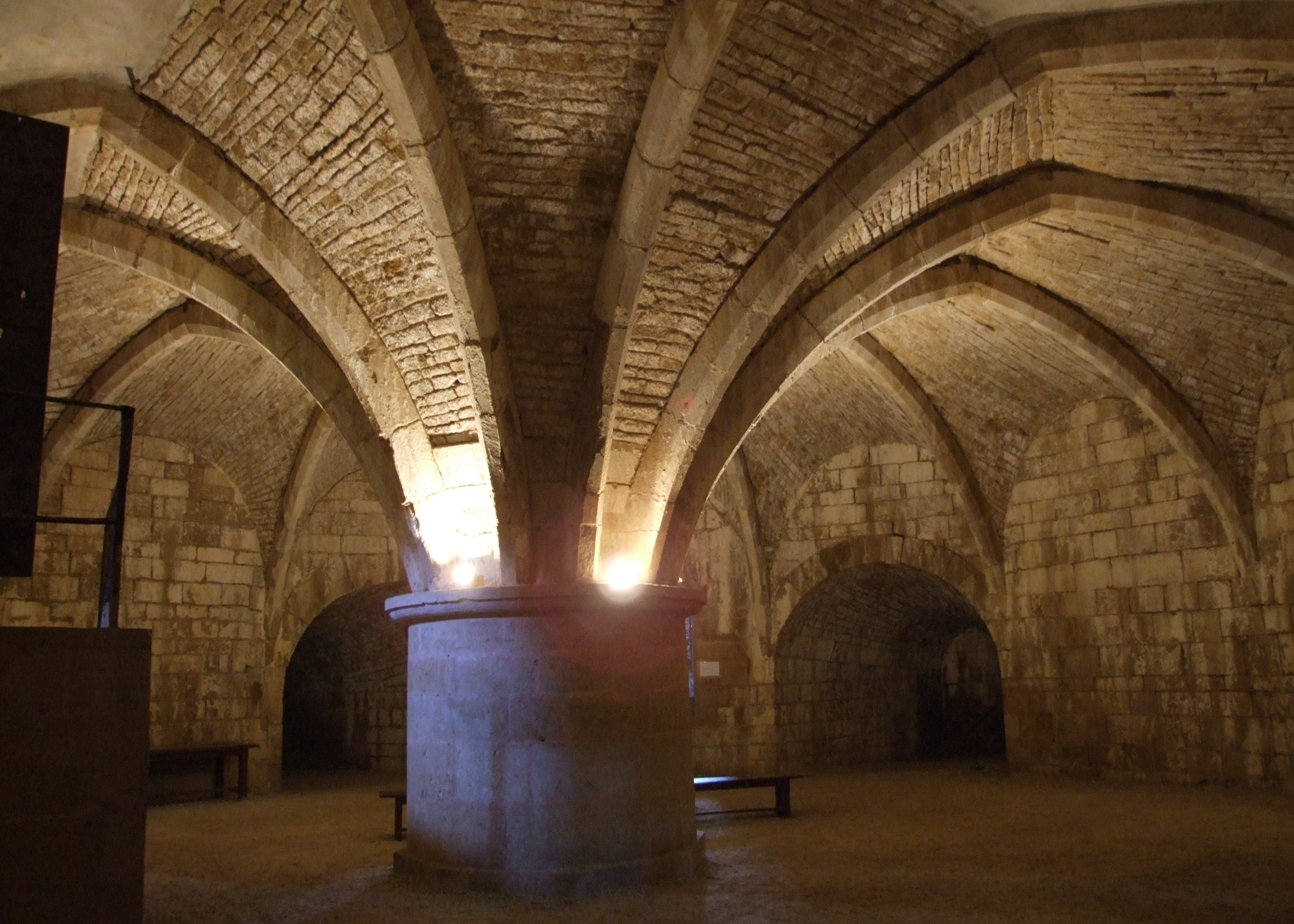
Navarre and d'Orval Tower

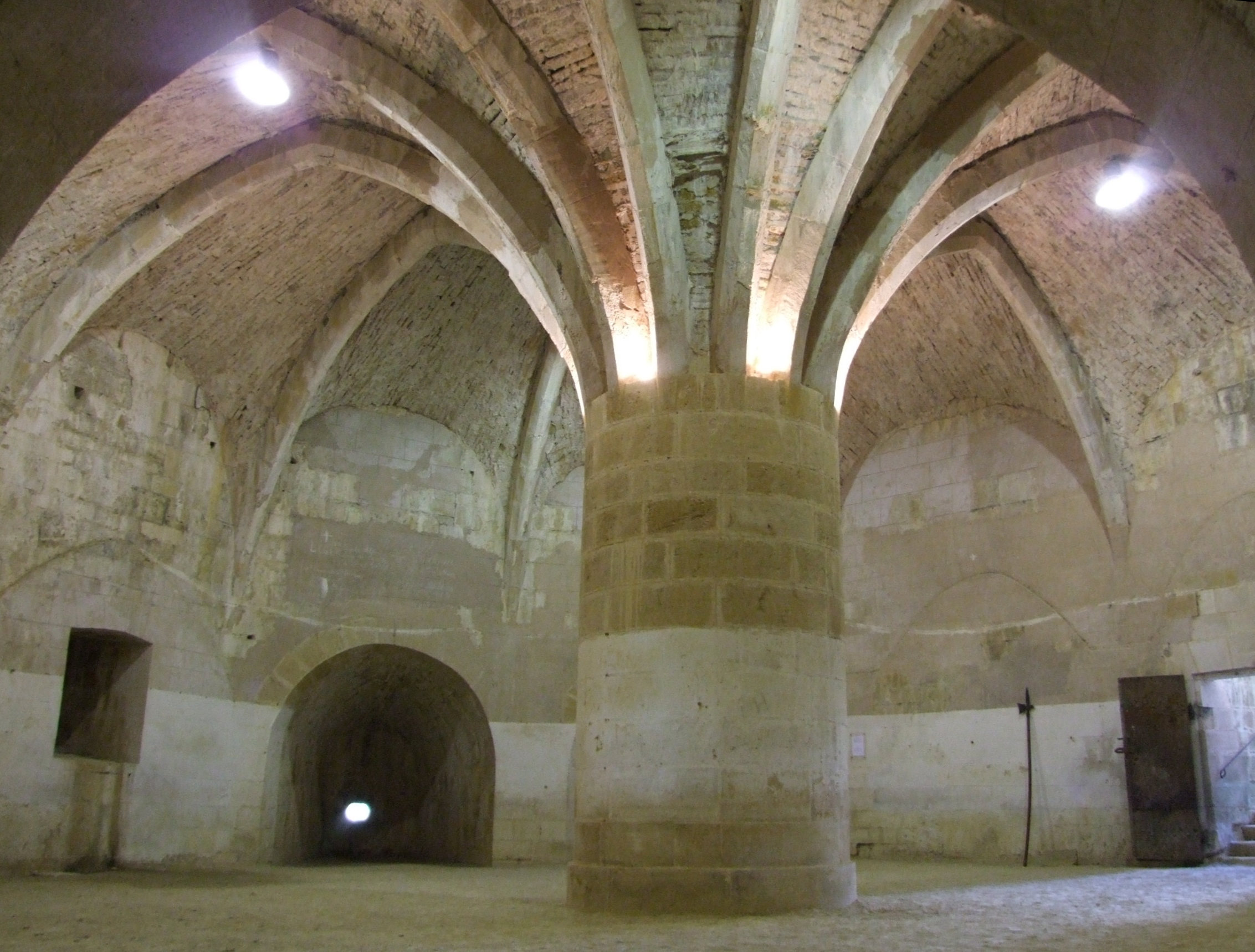
Navarre and d'Orval Tower

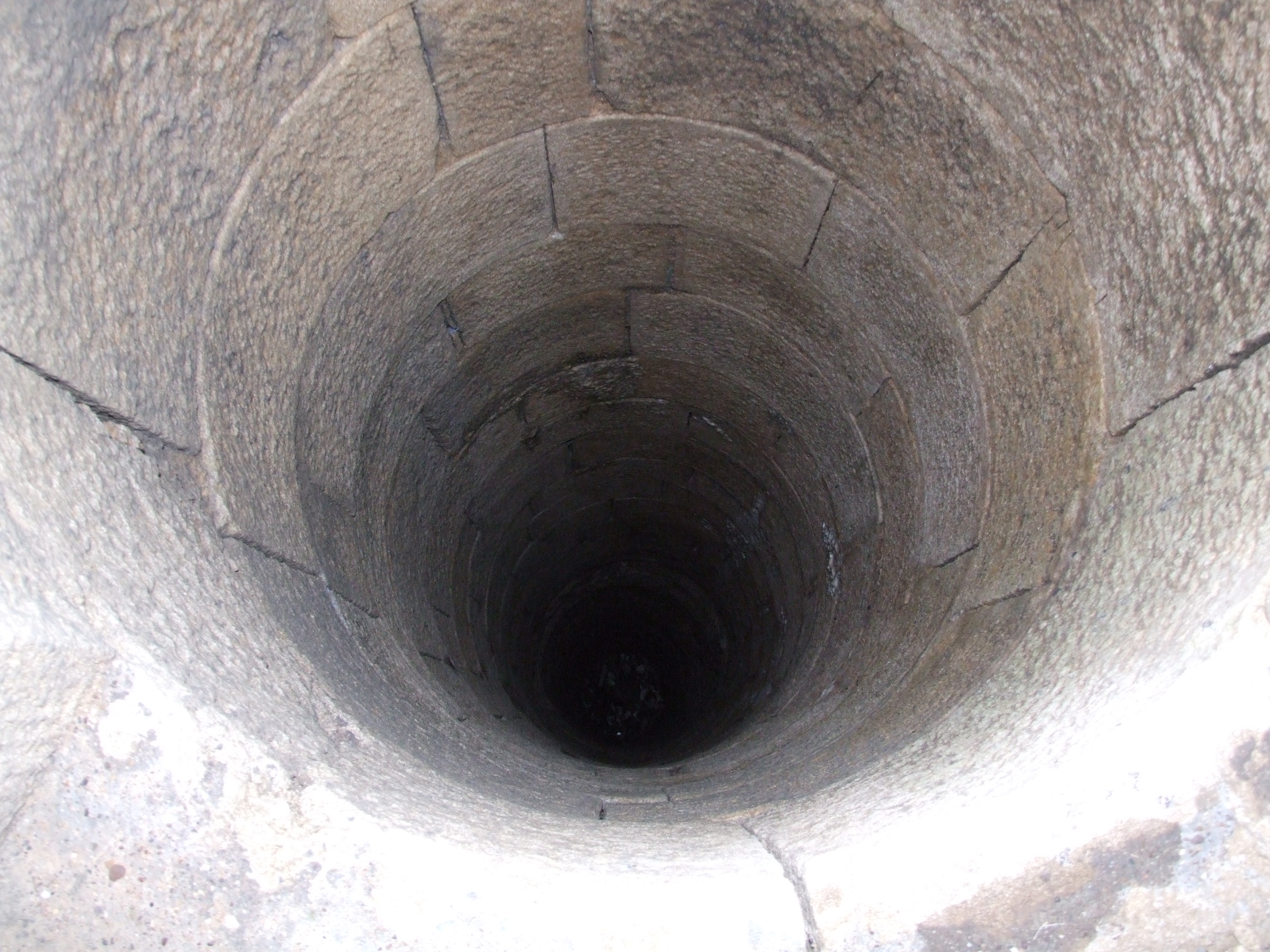
Navarre and d'Orval Tower well

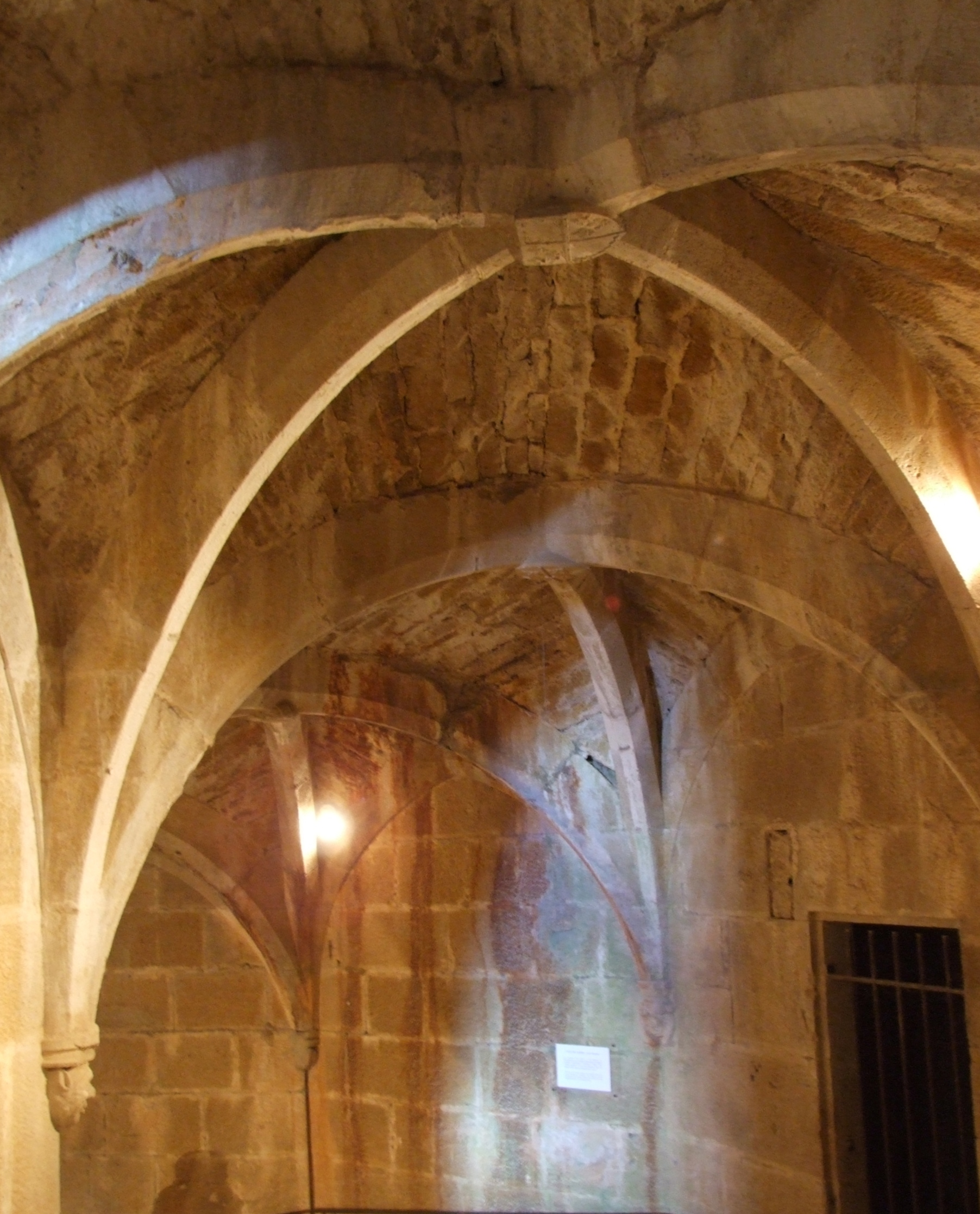
Navarre and d'Orval Tower vaulted arch

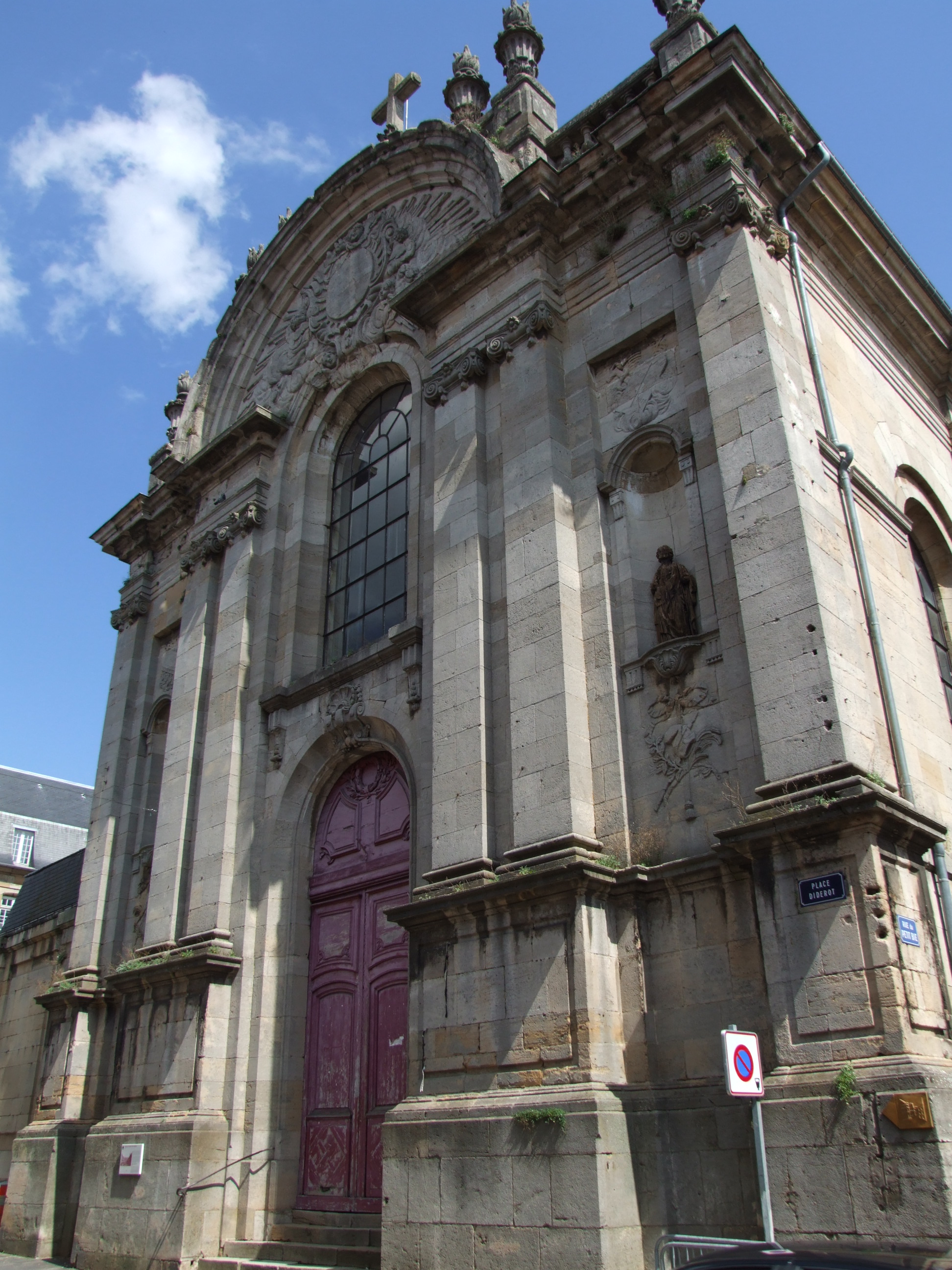
Former Jesuit College

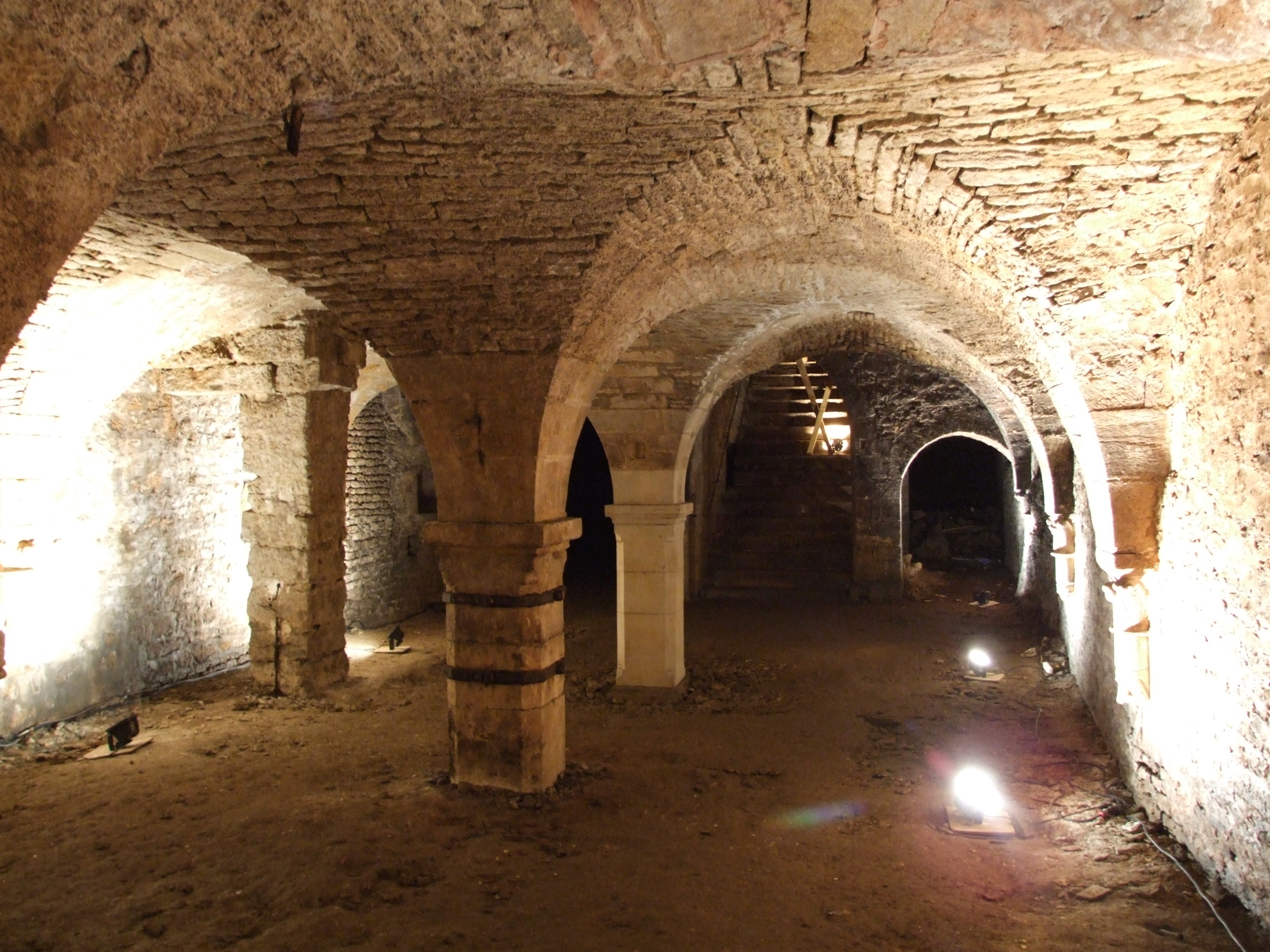
Renaissance cellar

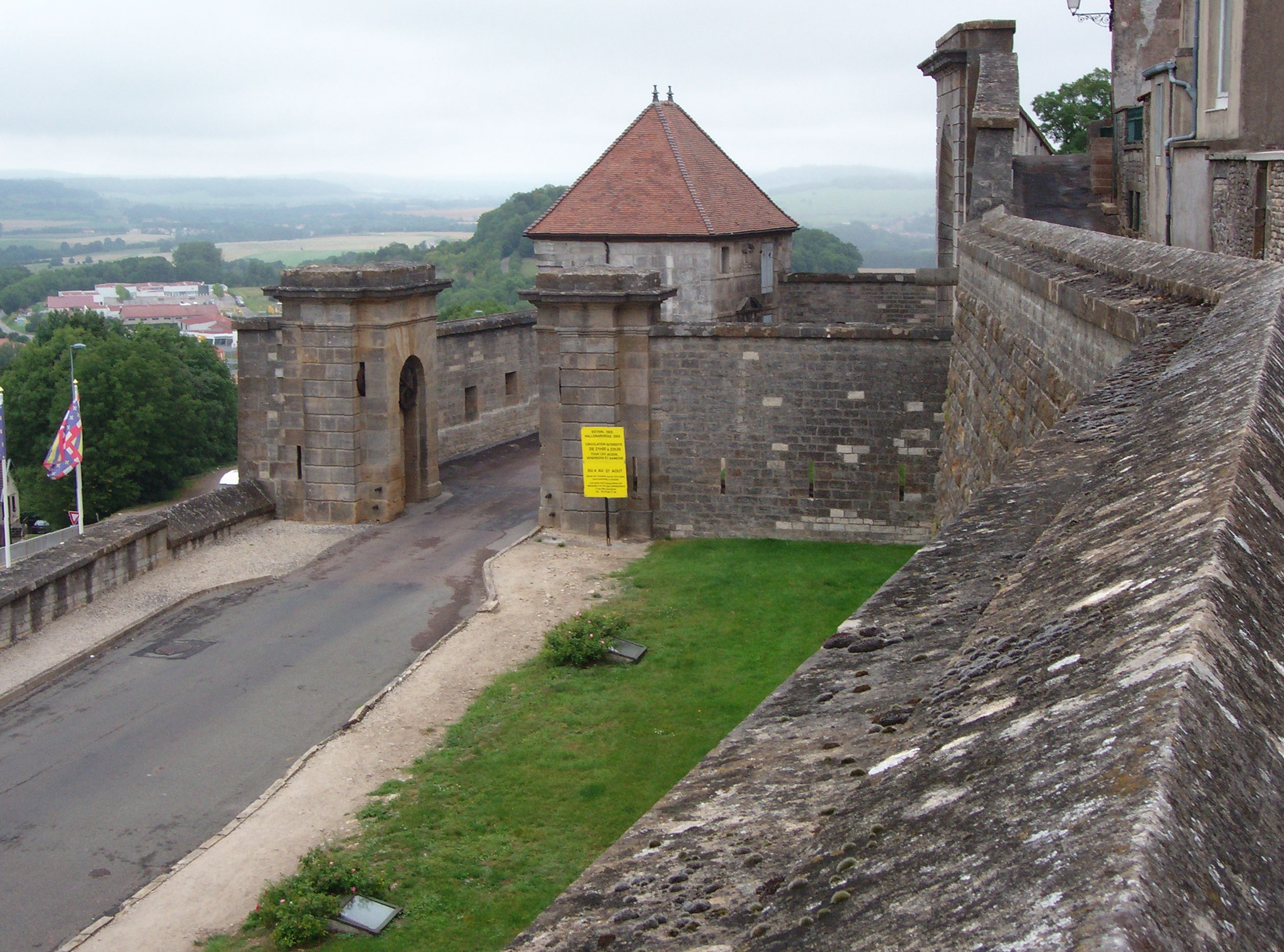
Entrance to City Hall

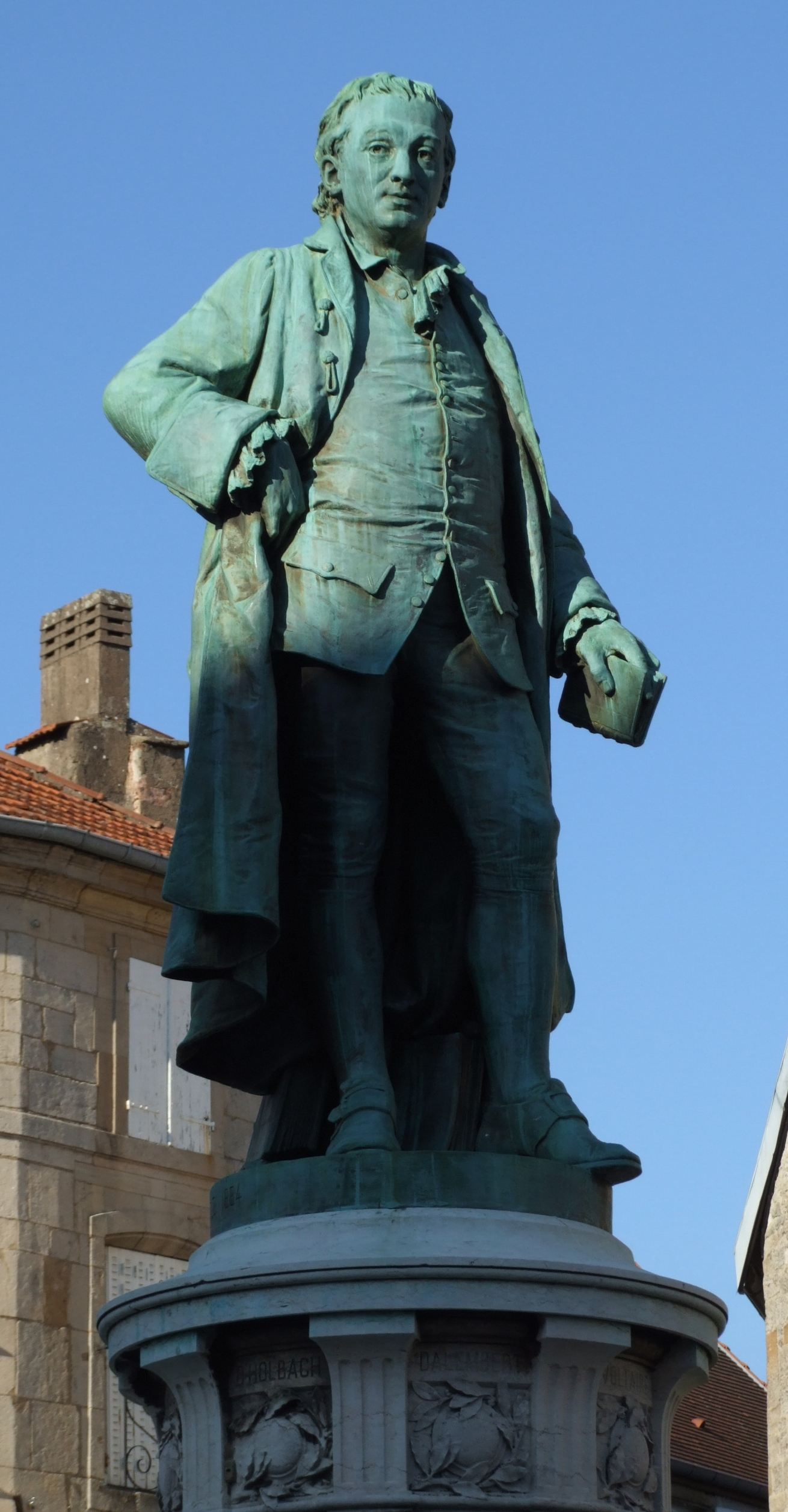
Statue of Denis Diderot

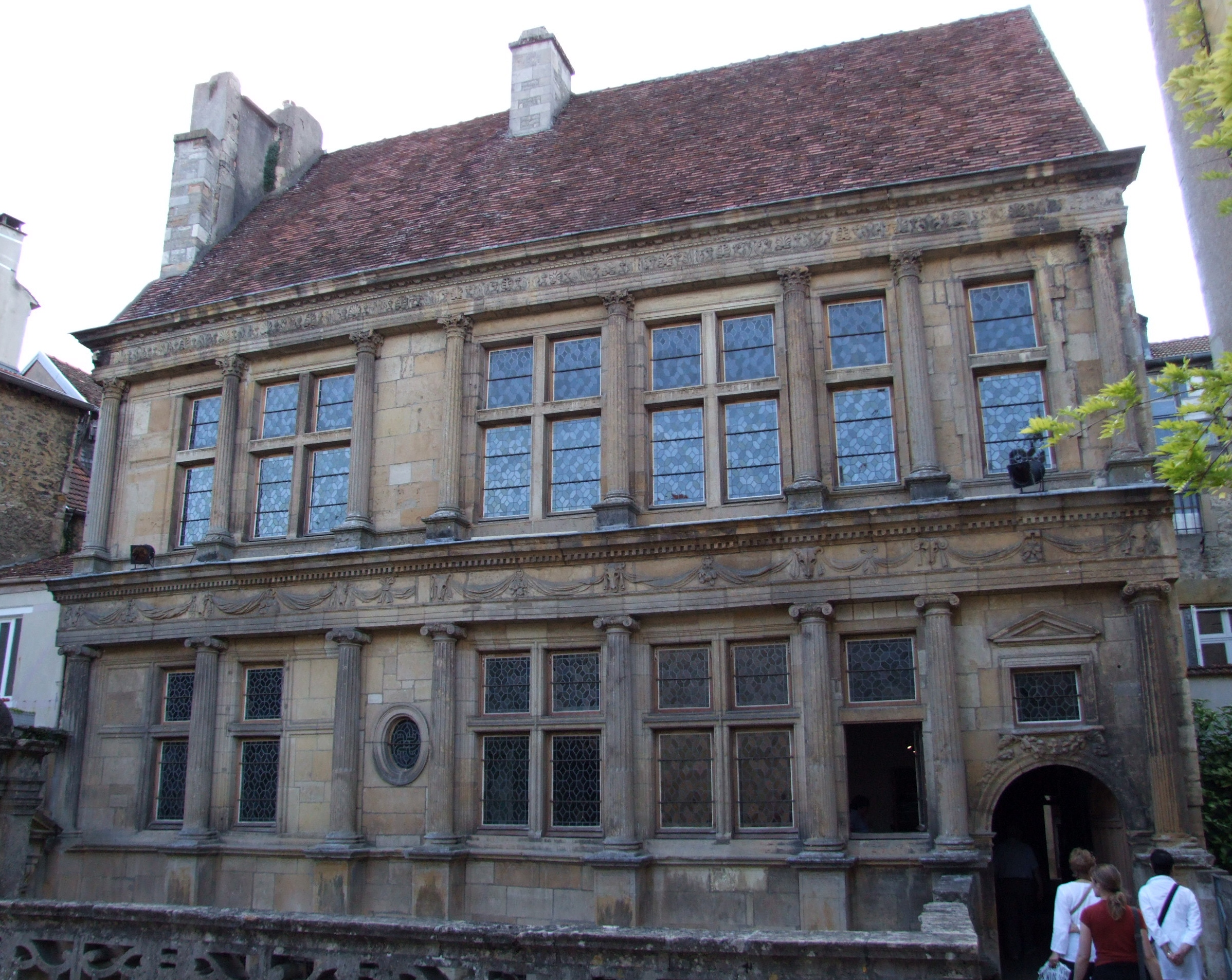
Renaissance period mansion

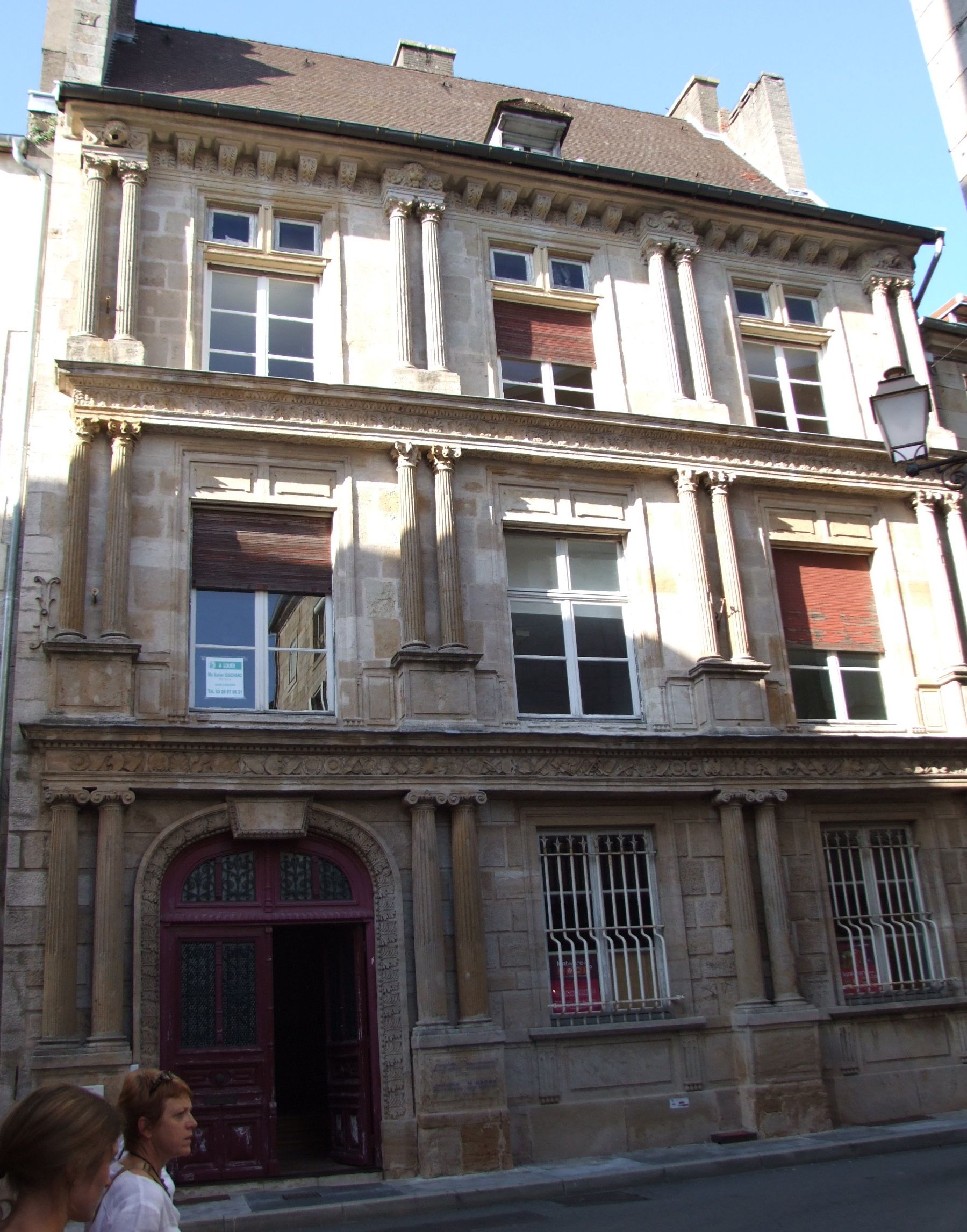
Renaissance period mansion

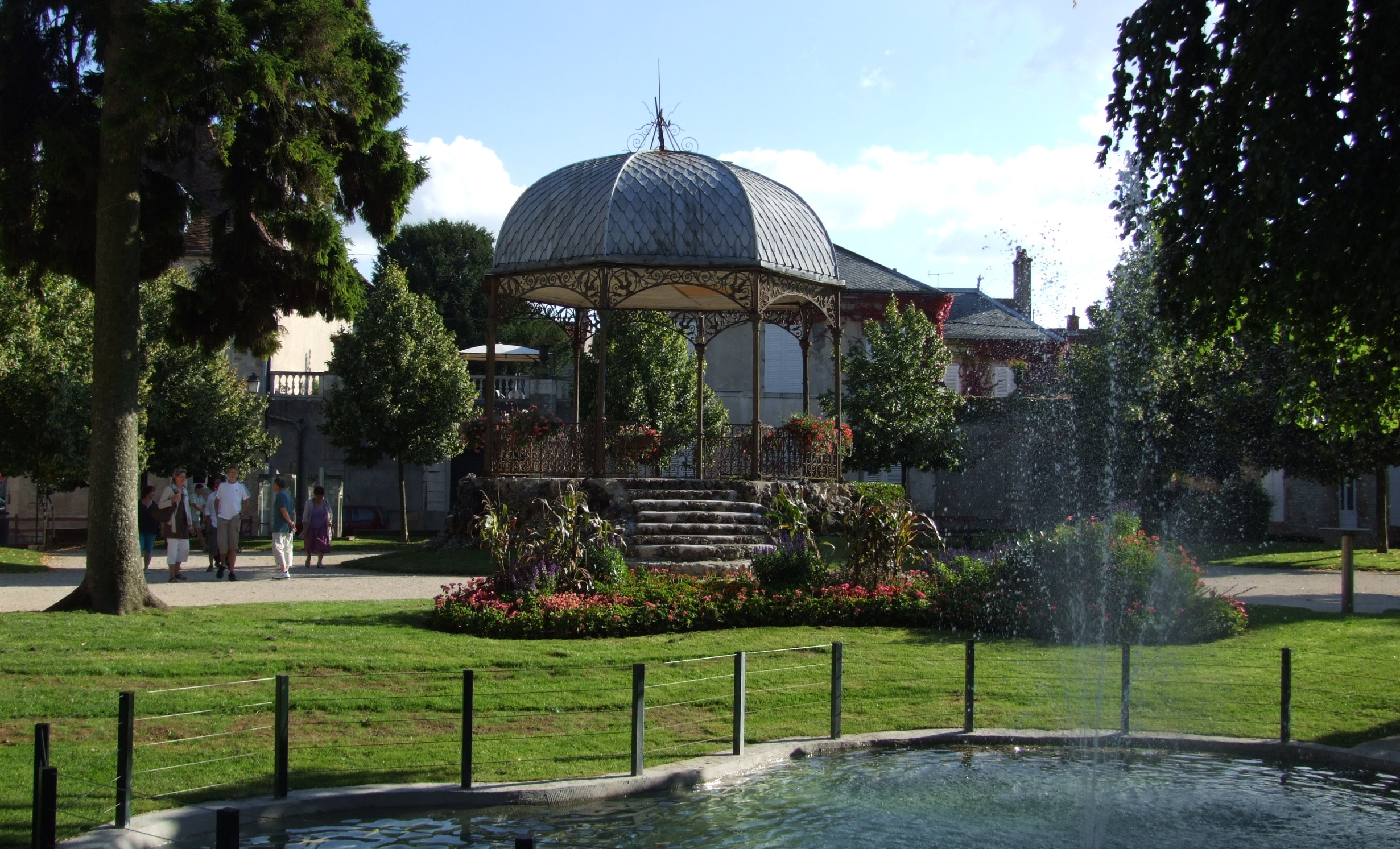
Henriot Square

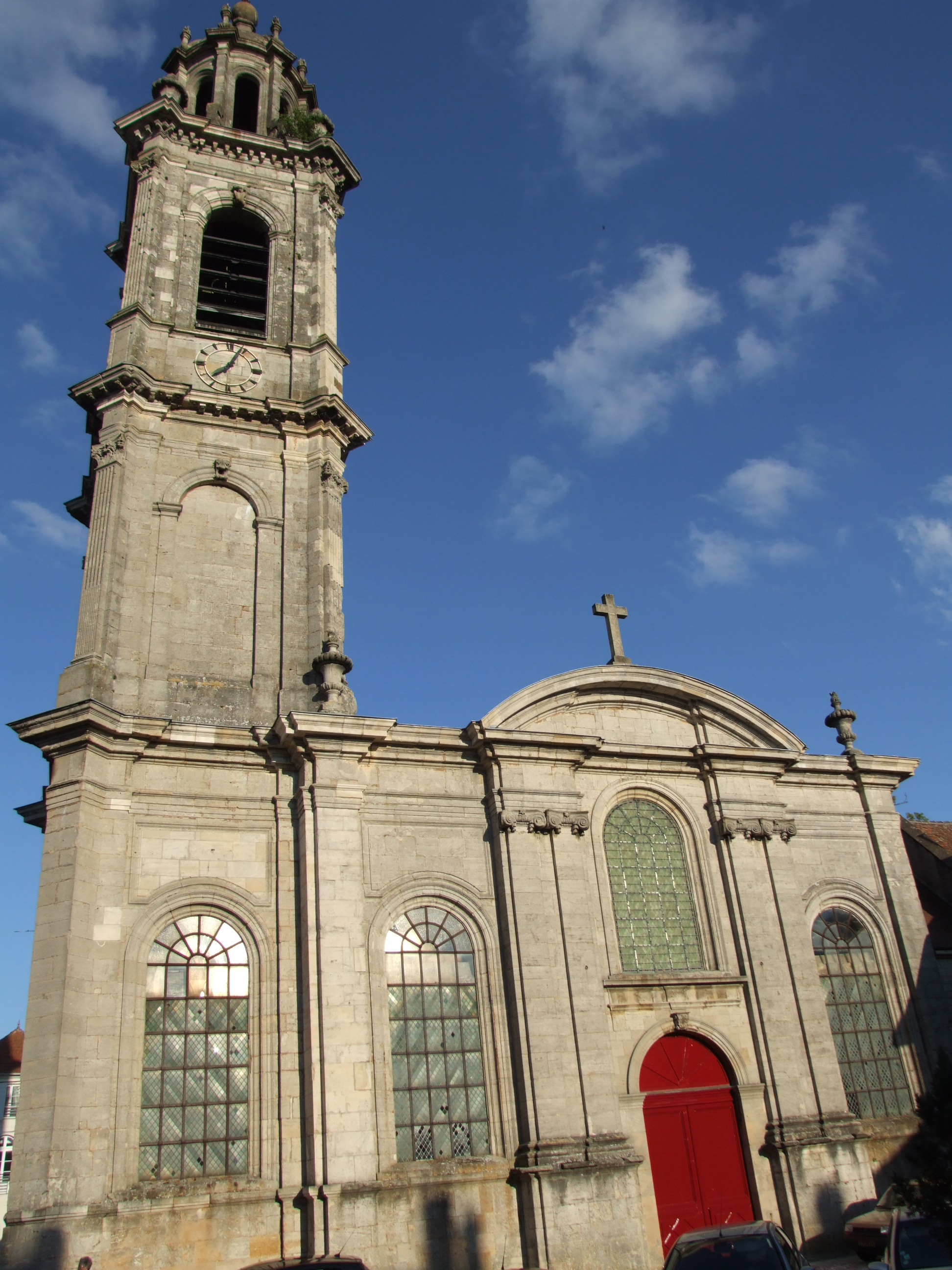
Saint-Martin Church
