= Eusèbe Renaudot =

French theologian and Orientalist (1646–1720)

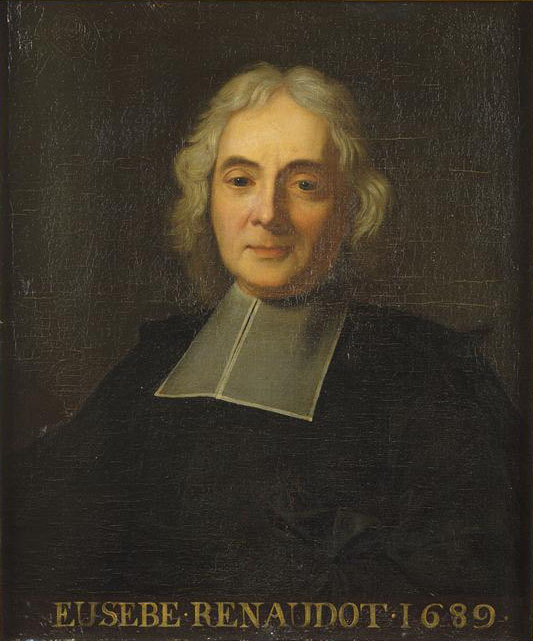
Eusèbe Renaudot (1689)

Eusèbe Renaudot (French pronunciation: [øzɛb ʁənodo]; 20 July 1646 – 1 September 1720) was a French theologian and Orientalist.

== Biography ==
Renaudot was born in Paris, and brought up and educated for a career in the church. After being educated by the Jesuits, and joining the Oratorians in 1666, he was in poor health, left his order, and never took more than minor orders. Despite his interest in theology and his title of abbé, much of his life was spent at the French court, where he attracted the notice of Colbert and was often employed in confidential affairs.

He was a prominent supporter of Jacques-Bénigne Bossuet, in the controversies with Richard Simon, François Fénelon and the Jesuits. In later life his attitudes became Gallican and Jansenist. He became a member of the Académie française (1689), the Academy of Inscriptions (1691), and the Accademia della Crusca of Florence.

== Works ==
The learning in Eastern languages which he acquired in his youth and maintained amid the distractions of court life did not bear fruit until he was sixty-two.

Renaudot's best-known books are Historia Patriarcharum Alexandrinorum (Paris, 1713 which is translation of original work by Severus Ibn al-Muqaffa) and Liturgiarum orientalium collectio (2 vols., 1715–16). The latter argued for continuous Christian belief in the sacraments, the topic on which most of his theological writings turned, and which was then, in consequence of the controversies attaching to Antoine Arnauld's Perpétuité de la foy de l'Église, a major matter of debate between French Catholics and Protestants.

Other works were Gennadii Patriarchae Constantinopolitani Homiliae de Eucharistia (Paris, 1709) and Anciennes relations des Indes et de la Chine (Paris, 1718, see fr).

== See also ==
- Théophraste Renaudot, grandfather of Eusèbe Renaudot
