= Mark Tungate =

Mark Tungate is a British writer based in Paris, France. He is the author of Media Monoliths: How Media Brands Thrive and Survive (2004), Fashion Brands: Branding Style From Armani to Zara (2005, Third Edition 2012), Adland: A Global History of Advertising (2007, Second Edition 2013, listed among the best business books of 2007 by Library Journal), Branded Male: Marketing to Men (2008), Luxury World: The Past, Present and Future of Luxury Brands (2009), Branded Beauty: How Marketing Changed the Way We Look (2011), and The Escape Industry: How Iconic and Innovative Brands Built the Travel Business (2017), all published by Kogan Page. Tungate also collaborated with Renzo Rosso, the founder of clothing company Diesel S.p.A., on the book Fifty (Gestalten Verlag, 2006), about Rosso's life and the Diesel brand. The graphic design was by Barcelona-based creative collective Vasava.
