= List of princesses of Sweden =

This is a list of Swedish princesses from the accession of Gustaf I, from the House of Vasa, and continues through the Houses of Palatinate-Zweibrücken, Holstein-Gottorp and Bernadotte.

An individual holding the title of "princess of Sweden" would usually also be styled Her Royal Highness. However, three of the four sisters of Carl XVI Gustaf, lost this style upon their marriages to commoners though retained their titles as a courtesy. Additionally, on 7 October 2019, Carl XVI Gustaf issued a decree limiting the style of Royal Highness to his children and his heir's heirs, though allowing his granddaughters who lost the style through this decree to retain their titles, duchies and place in the line of succession.

== List of Swedish princesses by birth ==
Portrait	Name	Arms	Born	Died	Royal lineage	Notes
	Catherine Gustavsdotter		6 June 1539	21 December 1610	Eldest daughter of Gustav I and Margaret Leijonhufvud	Married Edzard II, Count of East Frisia, on 1 October 1559, widowed in 1599
	Cecilia Gustavsdotter		16 November 1540	27 January 1627	Daughter of Gustav I and Margaret Leijonhufvud	Married Christopher II, Margrave of Baden-Rodemachern, on 11 November 1564, widowed in 1575
	Anna Gustavsdotter		1545	1610	Daughter of Gustav I and Margaret Leijonhufvud	Married George John I, Count Palatine of Veldenz on 20 December 1562, widowed in 1592
	Sophia Gustavsdotter		1547	1611	Daughter of Gustav I and Margaret Leijonhufvud	Married Magnus II, Duke of Saxe-Lauenburg on 4 July 1568, widowed in 1603
	Elizabeth Gustavsdotter		1549	1597	Daughter of Gustav I and Margaret Leijonhufvud	Married Christopher, Duke of Mecklenburg on 7 May 1581, widowed in 1592
	Sigrid Eriksdotter		1566	1633	Daughter of Eric XIV and Karin Månsdotter	Married Henrik Klasson Tott in 1597, widowed in 1603. Second Marriage Nils Nilsson on 10 September 1609, widowed in 1613.
	Isabella		1564	1566	Daughter of John III and Catherine Jagiellon	Died in infancy
	Anna		1568	1625	Daughter of John III and Catherine Jagiellon	Died unmarried
	Margareta Elisabeth		1580	1585	Daughter of Carl IX and Maria of the Palatinate-Simmern	Died in infancy
	Elisabeth Sabina		1582	1585	Daughter of Carl IX and Maria of the Palatinate-Simmern	Died in infancy
	Catherine		1584	1638	Daughter of Charles IX and Maria of the Palatinate-Simmern	Married John Casimir, Count Palatine of Kleeburg on 11 June 1615
	Maria		1588	1589	Daughter of Charles IX and Maria of the Palatinate-Simmern	Died in infancy
	Christina		1593	1594	Daughter of Charles IX and Christina of Holstein-Gottorp	Died in infancy
	Maria Elizabeth		1596	1618	Daughter of Charles IX and Christina of Holstein-Gottorp	Married John, Duke of Östergötland on 29 November 1612, widowed in 1618
	Anna Maria		1593	1600	Daughter of Sigismund III and Anne of Austria	Also a princess of Poland and Lithuania; Died in infancy
	Catherine		1594	1594	Daughter of Sigismund III and Anne of Austria	Also a princess of Poland and Lithuania; Died in infancy
	Catherine		1596	1597	Daughter of Sigismund III and Anne of Austria	Also a princess of Poland and Lithuania; Died in infancy
	Anna Constance		1616	1616	Daughter of Sigismund III and Constance of Austria	Also a princess of Poland and Lithuania; Died in infancy
	Anna Catherine Constance		1619	1651	Daughter of Sigismund III and Constance of Austria	Also a princess of Poland and Lithuania; Married Philip William, Elector Palatine on 8 June 1642
	Christina		1623	1624	Daughter of Gustav II Adolf and Maria Eleonora of Brandenburg	Died in infancy
	Christina Augusta		1626	1689	Daughter of Gustav II Adolf and Maria Eleonora of Brandenburg	Title held until her accession in 1632; Abdicated in 1654; Died unmarried
	Maria Euphrosyne		1625	1687	Cousin and foster-sibling of Christina, and sister of Charles X	Married Magnus Gabriel De la Gardie on 7 March 1647, widowed in 1686
	Maria Anna Isabella		1642	1642	Granddaughter of Sigismund III and Anne of Austria	Also a princess of Poland and Lithuania; Died in infancy
	Maria Anna Theresa		1650	1651	Granddaughter of Sigismund III and Constance of Austria	Died in infancy
	Hedwig Sophia Augusta		1681	1708	Charles XI and Ulrika Eleonora of Denmark	Married Frederick IV, Duke of Holstein-Gottorp on 12 May 1698, widowed in 1702
	Ulrika Eleonora		1688	1741	Charles XI and Ulrika Eleonora of Denmark	Title held until her accession in 1688; Abdicated in 1720; Married Landgrave Frederick of Hesse-Kassel in 1715
	Sophia Maria Louisa Fredrica Albertina		1753	1829	Daughter of Adolf Frederick and Louisa Ulrika of Prussia	Made Coadjutrix of Quedlinburg Abbey in 1767 by her uncle, Frederick II, King of Prussia; Became Princess-Abbess of Quedlinburg upon the death of her aunt, Anna Amalia of Prussia in 1787, reigned until 1802; Died unmarried
	Louise Hedwig		1797	1797	Daughter of Charles XIII and Hedwig Elizabeth Charlotte of Holstein-Gottorp	Stillborn
	Sophie Wilhelmine Catherine Marie Louise Charlotte Anne		1801	1865	Eldest daughter of Gustav IV Adolf and Frederica of Baden	Married Leopold, Grand Duke of Baden on 25 July 1819, widowed in 1852
	Amalia Maria Charlotta		22 February 1805	31 August 1853	Second daughter of Gustaf IV Adolf and Frederica of Baden	Died unmarried
	Cecilia		22 June 1807	27 January 1844	Third daughter of Gustaf IV Adolf and Frederica of Baden	Married August, Grand Duke of Oldenburg, on 5 May 1831
	Carola Frederica Francis Stephanie Amalia Cecilia		5 August 1833	15 December 1907	Granddaughter of Gustaf IV Adolf and Frederica of Baden	Married Albrecht, Crown Prince of Saxony, on 18 June 1853
	Charlotta Eugenia Augusta Amalia Albertina		24 April 1830	23 April 1889	Daughter of Oscar I and Joséphine of Leuchtenberg	Also a princess of Norway
	Louise Josephine Eugenie		31 October 1851	20 March 1926	Daughter of Carl XV and Louise of the Netherlands	Also a princess of Norway until 1905; Married Frederik, Crown Prince of Denamark, on 28 July 1869
	Margaretha Sofia Louise Ingeborg		25 June 1899	4 January 1977	Granddaughter of Oscar II and Sophia of Nassau	Also a princess of Norway until 1905; Married Prince Axel of Denmark on 22 May 1919
	Märtha Sofia Louise Dagmar Thyra		28 March 1901	5 April 1954	Granddaughter of Oscar II and Sophia of Nassau	Also a princess of Norway until 1905; Married Olav, Crown Prince of Norway, on 21 March 1929
	Astrid Sofia Louise Thyra		17 November 1905	23 August 1935	Granddaughter of Oscar II and Sophia of Nassau	Married Léopold, Duke of Brabant, on 10 November 1926
	Ingrid Victoria Sofia Louise Margareta		28 March 1910	7 November 2000	Daughter of Gustaf VI Adolf and Margaret of Connaught	Married Frederik, Crown Prince of Denmark, on 24 May 1935
	Margaretha Désirée Victoria		31 October 1934		Granddaughter of Gustaf VI Adolf and Margaret of Connaught	Married John Ambler on 30 June 1964; Lost style of Royal Highness upon unequal marriage
	Birgitta Ingeborg Alice		19 January 1937	4 December 2024	Granddaughter of Gustaf VI Adolf and Margaret of Connaught	Married Prince Johann Georg of Hohenzollern on 25 May 1961
	Désirée Elisabeth Sibylla		2 June 1938	21 January 2026	Granddaughter of Gustaf VI Adolf and Margaret of Connaught	Married Baron Niclas Silfverschiöld on 5 June 1964; Lost style of Royal Highness upon unequal marriage
	Christina Louise Helena		3 August 1943		Granddaughter of Gustaf VI Adolf and Margaret of Connaught	Married Tord Magnuson on 15 June 1974; Lost style of Royal Highness upon unequal marriage
	Victoria Ingrid Alice Désirée		14 July 1977		Elder daughter of Carl XVI Gustaf and Silvia Sommerlath	Crown Princess from 1 January 1980; Created Duchess of Västergötland on 9 January 1980; Married Daniel Westling on 19 June 2010
	Madeleine Thérèse Amelie Josephine		10 June 1982		Second daughter of Carl XVI Gustaf and Silvia Sommerlath	Duchess of Hälsingland and Gästrikland since birth Married Christopher O'Neill on 8 June 2013
	Estelle Silvia Ewa Mary		23 February 2012		Granddaughter of Carl XVI Gustaf and Silvia Sommerlath	Heiress apparent since birth Duchess of Östergötland since birth
	Leonore Lilian Maria		20 February 2014		Granddaughter of Carl XVI Gustaf and Silvia Sommerlath	Duchess of Gotland since birth Lost style of Royal Highness by decree on 7 October 2019
	Adrienne Josephine Alice		9 March 2018		Granddaughter of Carl XVI Gustaf and Silvia Sommerlath	Duchess of Blekinge since birth Lost style of Royal Highness by decree on 7 October 2019
	Ines Marie Lilian Silvia		7 February 2025		Granddaughter of Carl XVI Gustaf and Silvia Sommerlath	Duchess of Västerbotten since birth Not given style of Royal Highness due to royal decree from 7 October 2019

== List of Swedish princesses by marriage ==
Portrait	Name	Swedish name	Arms	Birth	Marriage	Death	Spouse	Notes
	Catherine Jagiellon	Katarina		1 November 1526	4 October 1562	16 September 1583	Johan, Duke of Finland	Queen consort from 1568
	Countess Anna Maria of the Palatinate	Maria		24 July 1561	11 May 1579	29 July 1589	Prince Carl, Duke of Södermanland	
	Princess Christina of Holstein-Gottorp	Kristina		13 April 1573	8 July 1592	8 December 1625	Prince Carl, Duke of Södermanland	Queen consort from 1604–1611
	Princess Maria Elizabeth	Maria Elisabet		10 March 1596	29 November 1612	7 August 1618	Prince Johan, Duke of Östergötland	Also a princess by birth
	Princess Louisa Ulrika of Prussia	Lovisa Ulrika		24 July 1720	17 July 1744	16 July 1782	Adolf Fredrik, Prince-Bishop of Lübeck	Queen consort from 1751–1771
	Princess Sophia Magdalena of Denmark	Sofia Magdalena		3 July 1746	4 November 1766	21 August 1813	Crown Prince Gustaf	Queen consort from 1771–1792
	Princess Hedvig Elisabeth Charlotte of Holstein-Gottorp	Charlotta		22 March 1759	4 July 1774	20 June 1818	Prince Carl, Duke of Södermanland	Queen consort from 1809–1818
	Princess Louise Amelie of Baden	Lovisa		5 June 1811	9 November 1830	19 July 1854	Gustaf, Prince of Vasa	
	Désirée Clary	Desideria		8 November 1777	17 August 1798	17 December 1860	Jean-Baptiste Bernadotte	Crown Princess from 1810; Queen consort from 1818–1844
	Princess Joséphine of Leuchtenberg	Josefina		14 March 1807	22 May 1823	7 June 1876	Crown Prince Oscar	Queen consort from 1844–1859
	Princess Louise of the Netherlands	Lovisa		5 August 1828	19 June 1850	30 March 1871	Crown Prince Carl	Queen consort from 1859
	Princess Sophia of Nassau	Sofia		9 July 1836	6 June 1857	30 December 1913	Prince Oscar, Duke of Östergötland	Queen consort from 1872–1907
	Princess Therese of Saxe-Altenburg	Teresia		21 December 1836	16 April 1864	9 November 1914	Prince August, Duke of Dalarna	
	Princess Victoria of Baden	Victoria		7 August 1862	20 September 1881	4 April 1930	Crown Prince Gustaf	Queen consort from 1907
	Princess Ingeborg of Denmark	Ingeborg		2 August 1878	27 August 1897	12 March 1958	Prince Carl, Duke of Västergötland	
	Princess Margaret of Connaught	Margareta		15 January 1882	15 June 1905	1 May 1920	Prince Gustaf Adolf, Duke of Scania	Crown Princess from 1907
	Lady Louise Mountbatten	Lovisa		13 July 1889	3 November 1923	7 March 1965	Crown Prince Gustaf Adolf	Queen consort from 1950
	Grand Duchess Maria Pavlovna of Russia	Maria		18 April 1890	3 May 1908 div. 13 March 1914	13 December 1958	Prince Wilhelm, Duke of Södermanland	Title lost upon divorce
	Princess Sibylla of Saxe-Coburg and Gotha	Sibylla		18 January 1908	19 October 1932	28 November 1972	Prince Gustaf Adolf, Duke of Västerbotten	Mother of Carl XVI Gustaf
	Lilian Davies	Lilian		30 August 1915	7 December 1976	10 March 2013	Prince Bertil, Duke of Halland	
	Sofia Hellqvist	Sofia		6 December 1984	13 June 2015		Prince Carl Philip, Duke of Värmland	
