= Princess Margaretha of Sweden =

Princess Axel of Denmark (1899–1977)

Margaretha of Sweden
- Princess Axel of Denmark
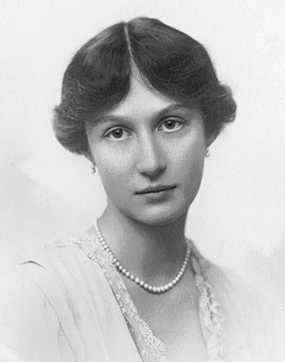
- Margaretha in 1918
- Born: 25 June 1899; Stora Parkudden, Djurgården, Stockholm, Sweden
- Died: 4 January 1977 (aged 77); Tranemosegård, Fakse, Zealand, Denmark
- Burial: Bernstorff Palace Gardens
- Spouse: Prince Axel of Denmark (m. 1919; died 1964)
- Issue: Prince Georg of Denmark; Count Flemming of Rosenborg
Names
- Margaretha Sofia Lovisa Ingeborg
- House: Bernadotte
- Father: Prince Carl, Duke of Västergötland
- Mother: Princess Ingeborg of Denmark

Princess Margaretha of Sweden (Margaretha Sofia Lovisa Ingeborg; 25 June 1899 – 4 January 1977) was a member of the Swedish Royal Family by birth and the Danish Royal Family by marriage. A granddaughter of King Oscar II and Queen Sophia of Sweden–Norway, she was the daughter of Prince Carl, Duke of Västergötland, and Princess Ingeborg of Denmark. In 1919, she married Prince Axel of Denmark, the second son of Prince Valdemar of Denmark and Princess Marie of Orléans. They had two children: Georg and Flemming.

Princess Margaretha was the elder sister of Crown Princess Märtha of Norway and Queen Astrid of the Belgians. Compared to her sisters, she led a relatively private life, but after the early deaths of her sisters, Margaretha became a great support for her sisters' motherless children in Belgium and Norway. Known affectionately to her family as "Tante Ta", she was a maternal aunt of King Harald V of Norway and Kings Baudouin and Albert II of Belgium; and a great aunt of King Haakon VIII of Norway, King Philippe of Belgium and Grand Duke Henri of Luxembourg. She was widowed in 1964, and remained active in royal duties throughout her later life. She died in 1977, aged 77.

== Early life ==
=== Birth and family ===
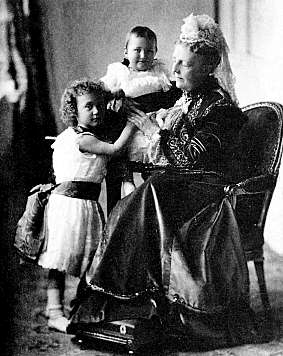
Princess Margaretha and her sister Princess Märtha with their grandmother Queen Sophia in 1902

Princess Margaretha was born on 25 June 1899 at her parents' summer residence, the Villa Parkudden, at Djurgården in Stockholm. Born into the Swedish Royal Family, the House of Bernadotte, she was the eldest child of Prince Carl, Duke of Västergötland, and Princess Ingeborg of Denmark. As a male-line granddaughter of King Oscar II and Queen Sophia of Sweden–Norway, she was born a princess of Sweden and Norway (but later just "of Sweden", due to the dissolution of the union between Norway and Sweden in 1905).

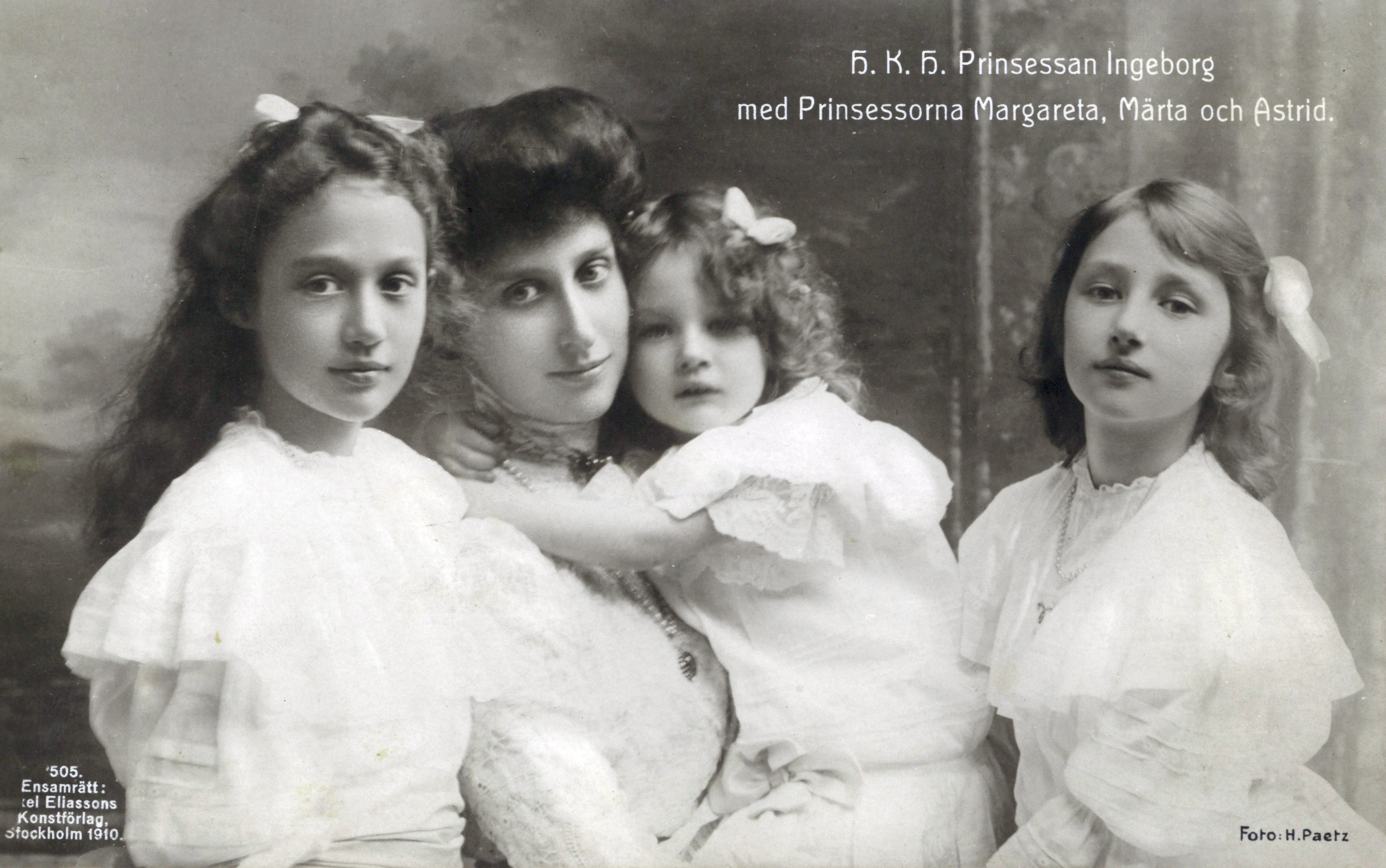
Princess Margaretha (left) with her mother and sisters in 1910.

Her parent's first child, Princess Margaretha would have three younger siblings: two sisters Princess Märtha and Princess Astrid, who would later became Crown Princess of Norway and Queen of the Belgians, respectively, as well as a younger brother, Prince Carl Junior, Duke of Östergötland.

=== Childhood and upbringing ===
Princess Margaretha grew up in Stockholm with her siblings, initially between Arvfurstens palats, a Neoclassical palace located at Gustav Adolfs Torg in central Stockholm, and the family's summer residence Villa Parkudden on the Djurgården island in Stockholm. From 1905, the family lived at the so-called Byströms Villa, also at Djurgården. From 1910 onwards, the family spent their summers by Bråviken, an inlet of the Baltic Sea near Norrköping in Östergötland, where Prince Carl had erected the summer residence Villa Fridhem in 1909.

According to consistent contemporary accounts, the children grew up in a home characterized by an informal and harmonious family life. The children were given a simple upbringing, and expected to learn household tasks: they were, for example, given a real stove in their play cottage, on which they cooked real food. In 1916, Princess Margaretha's confirmation attracted enthusiastic press coverage; the event was said to mark the beginning of a new age for the Swedish royal house, which had lacked princesses for so long.

=== Engagement and marriage ===
Princess Margaretha on her wedding day in 1919.

Wedding portrait of Princess Margaretha and Prince Axel in 1919.

One month short of her 20th birthday, Princess Margaretha was married to her mother's first cousin, the 30-year old Prince Axel of Denmark. A grandson of King Christian IX and Queen Louise of Denmark, Prince Axel was the second son of Prince Valdemar of Denmark, her mother's uncle, and the French-born Princess Marie of Orléans. Even though it was a dynastic alliance, the marriage was a love match; her mother remarked that the couple were so much in love that they could not be left alone in a furnished room.

The wedding was celebrated on 22 May 1919 with great festivities at Storkyrkan, the cathedral in Stockholm, located immediately adjacent to the Stockholm Palace where the wedding reception was held. It was the first royal wedding of a princess in Sweden in 50 years and attracted a great deal of public attention. It was also the first wedding between two members of Scandinavian royal families to be documented on film. The couple spent their honeymoon at Örgården, the summer residence of Margaretha’s uncle, Prince Eugen, near Vadstena by Lake Vättern in Östergötland.

The couple had two sons: Prince Georg of Denmark, who was born in 1920, and Prince Flemming of Denmark, who was born two years later, in 1922.

== Married life ==
=== Settling in Denmark ===
Princess Margaretha with her sister-in-law, Princess Margrethe of Denmark, in 1921.

Princess Margaretha adjusted herself well to her new life in Denmark, which she had often visited on family occasions during her upbringing, and the marriage is said to have been a happy one. As a wedding gift, Prince Axel and Princess Margaretha received the Villa Bernstorffshøj in Gentofte in the northern suburbs of Copenhagen as their residence. The house was located immediately adjacent to the gardens of Bernstorff Palace, Prince Axel's childhood home; they moved there in 1919 and lived there for the rest of their lives.

=== Activities ===
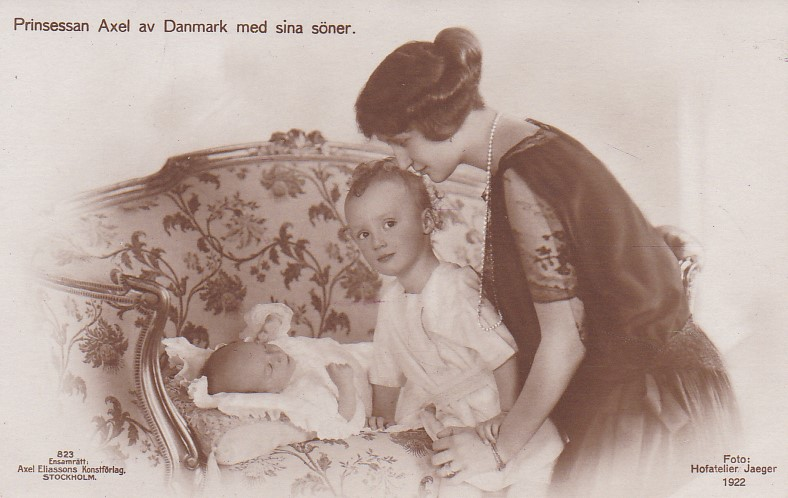
Princess Margaretha with her two sons, Prins Georg and Prince Flemming in 1923.

Compared to her sisters, Princess Margaretha lived a relatively private life and generally avoided publicity. She largely devoted herself to her family at Bernstorffshøj, where she and her husband maintained a high spirited, sociable and hospitable home. She had been interested in social issues in Sweden, and also became the engaged patron of several charity organisations in Denmark. Among other things, she served as chair of the association Gentofte Børnevenner for 22 years.

=== Family relations ===
Princess Margaretha is welcomed at Oslo East Station by her brother-in-law Crown Prince Olav during a visit to Norway in 1955.

Known affectionately to her family as "Tante Ta" ("Aunt Ta"), Princess Marghereta kept in close contact with her relations in the various royal families abroad and came to mean a great deal to them. After the early death of her sister Queen Astrid of Belgium, who was killed in a car accident in Switzerland in 1935, she became a great support for her sister's young children in Belgium, the future Grand Duchess Joséphine-Charlotte of Luxembourg and Kings Baudouin and Albert II of Belgium. After the death of her other sister, the Norwegian Crown Princess Märtha in 1954, she also became a great support for her sister's children in Norway, Princess Ragnhild, Princess Astrid, and the future King Harald V of Norway. She was the godmother of Astrid's grandchildren, the twins Prince Jean of Luxembourg and Princess Margaretha of Liechtenstein, as well as Märtha's daughter Princess Ragnhild, and granddaughter, Princess Märtha Louise of Norway.

Princess Marghereta and Prince Axel with their two sons and daughters-in-law in 1955.

Princess Margaretha was a leading guest at the 1947 wedding of her two second cousins, Princess Elizabeth and Philip, Duke of Edinburgh. Three years later, in 1950, her eldest son Prince Georg of Denmark married Princess Elizabeth's first cousin, Anne Bowes-Lyon, who was a niece of Queen Elizabeth of the United Kingdom (née Lady Elizabeth Bowes-Lyon).

== Later life ==
=== Last years ===
Her spouse Prince Axel died on 14 July 1964, at the age of 75. As a widow, Princess Margaretha remained active in royal duties throughout her later life. She traveled extensively and frequently visited her native Sweden. There she would join other members of the Swedish royal family in representative duties at official ceremonies – most notably, the Nobel Prize award ceremonies, which she attended in 1965–1968, in 1970–1972, and in 1974. Her last visit to Sweden took place in 1976, when she was a guest at the wedding of King Carl XVI Gustaf and Silvia Sommerlath.

=== Death and burial ===
Princess Margaretha survived her husband by 12 years and died at the age of 77 at the Tranemosegård estate in Kongsted, near Fakse, Denmark, on 4 January 1977. Instead of a traditional royal burial in a crypt at the Roskilde Cathedral on the island of Zealand, the traditional burial site for Danish monarchs since the 15th century, she was laid to rest in the gardens of Bernstorff Palace, where she is buried alongside her husband, their sons, and their daughters-in-law.

== Arms ==
Marital arms of Princess Margaretha of Sweden and Denmark	Arms as displayed in Riddarholmen Church in Stockholm

== Issue ==
- Prince George Valdemar Carl Axel of Denmark (16 April 1920 – 20 September 1986); married Anne Bowes-Lyon, niece of Queen Elizabeth of the United Kingdom (née Lady Elizabeth Bowes-Lyon), on 16 September 1950.
- Prince Flemming Valdemar Carl Axel of Denmark (9 March 1922 – 19 June 2002); married Alice Ruth Nielson, daughter of Kai Nielson and Edith Fischer, on 24 May 1949. They have four children, ten grandchildren and four great-grandchildren.

== Ancestry ==
Ancestors of Princess Margaretha of Sweden

8. Oscar I of Sweden
4. Oscar II of Sweden
9. Princess Joséphine of Leuchtenberg
2. Prince Carl, Duke of Västergötland
10. William, Duke of Nassau
5. Princess Sophia of Nassau
11. Princess Pauline of Württemberg
1. Princess Margaretha of Sweden
12. Christian IX of Denmark
6. Frederick VIII of Denmark
13. Princess Louise of Hesse-Kassel
3. Princess Ingeborg of Denmark
14. Charles XV of Sweden
7. Princess Louise of Sweden
15. Princess Louise of the Netherlands
