= HNoMS Haakon VII =

HNoMS Haakon VII may refer to the following Royal Norwegian Navy ships:

- HNoMS King Haakon VII, an escort ship in service from 1942 to 1951
- HNoMS Haakon VII (A537), a training ship in service from 1958 to 1974
