= Look to Norway =

1942 speech by U.S. President Franklin D. Roosevelt

The "Look to Norway" speech by U.S. President Franklin D. Roosevelt was given during the handover ceremony of the Royal Norwegian Navy ship HNoMS King Haakon VII at the Washington Navy Yard on 16 September 1942. The speech served as an important source of inspiration to Norwegians fighting the German occupation of Norway and the rest of Europe as well as for the resistance fighters of other small countries during World War II.

In the speech the President said:

If there is anyone who still wonders why this war is being fought, let him look to Norway. If there is anyone who has any delusions that this war could have been averted, let him look to Norway; and if there is anyone who doubts the democratic will to win, again I say, let him look to Norway.

The speech also made an impact on Norwegian-Americans and the rest of the American public's opinion on the struggle in Europe. The impression of the Norwegian's situation had been severely damaged by an article by the American reporter, Leland Stowe, who happened to be in Oslo on the day the Germans marched into the city. He witnessed shocked Norwegian civilians standing around watching the Germans march down the parade street Karl Johans gate. He misinterpreted the shock as indifference and acceptance on the part of the Norwegian population and wrote a stinging article in Time and several newspapers which severely damaged the American public's opinion of the Norwegian resistance and therefore their motivation to help Norway and Europe. The speech corrected that impression.

In a speech on 13 April 1940, the President had already praised the Norwegian resistance. Roosevelt's interest in Norway was in part due to the good relations established by Norwegian Crown Prince Olav and his wife, Princess Märtha, and the Norwegian ambassador to the U.S., Wilhelm von Munthe af Morgenstierne (1887–1963).

In 2005, King Harald V of Norway attended a ceremony at Washington Navy Yard commemorating the alliance between Norway and the United States, where there was a reenactment of the speech.

== In popular culture ==
The 1943 Hollywood-film Edge of Darkness starring Errol Flynn told the story of a fictional fishing village in Norway starting an armed uprising against their German occupiers. It ends in a massive battle in the town centre, where even the priest starts machine-gunning enemy soldiers. The "Look to Norway" speech is then read through the end credits by a Roosevelt voice impersonator.

In the episode "The Gift" of Atlantic Crossing, Kyle MacLachlan, as President Roosevelt, recreates the "Look to Norway" speech during a reenactment of the handover ceremony of the HNoMS King Haakon VII.
