= Count Flemming of Rosenborg =

Flemming
- Count of Rosenborg
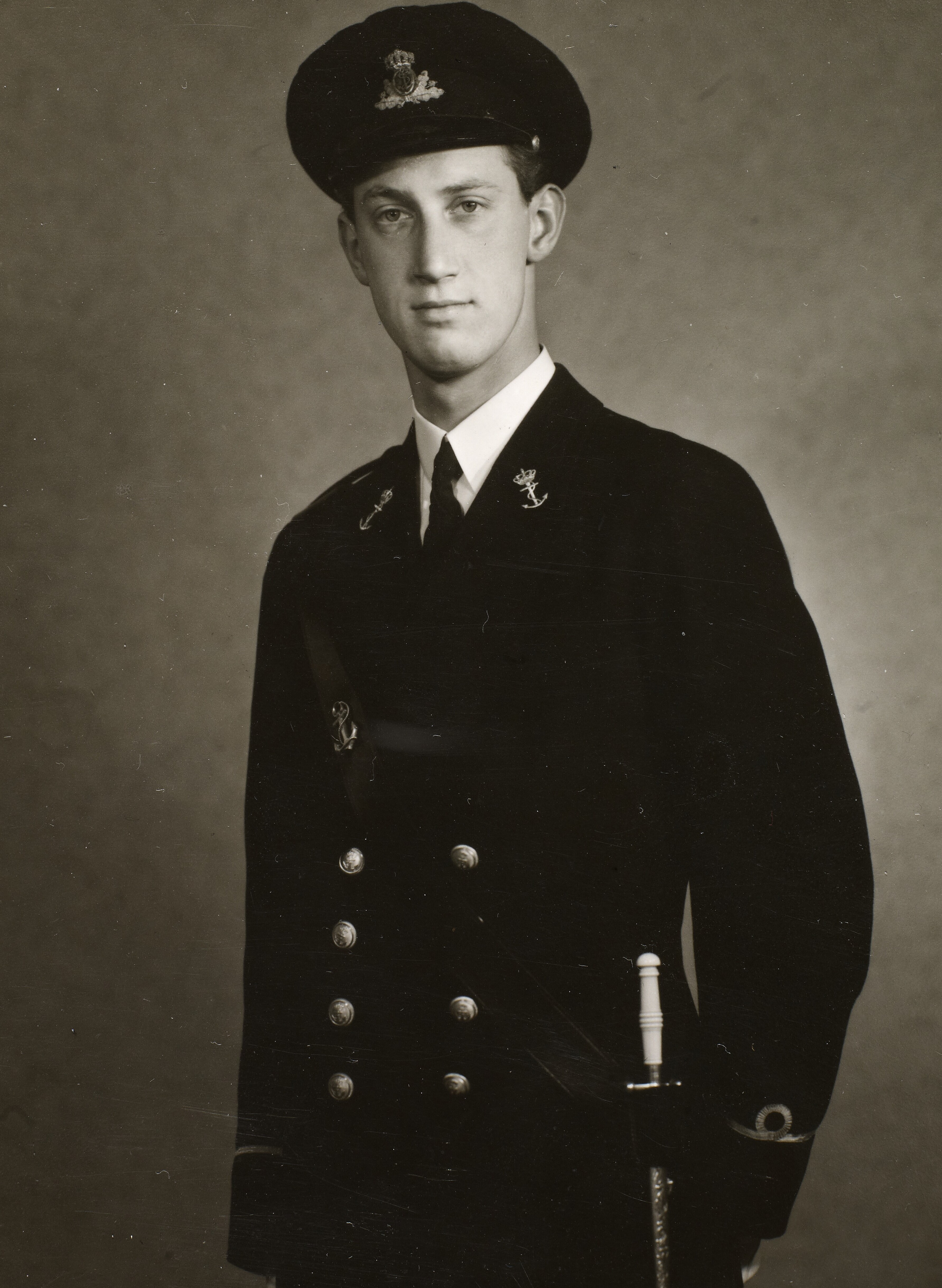
- Count Flemming in uniform.
- Born: Prince Flemming of Denmark; 9 March 1922; Stockholm, Sweden
- Died: 19 June 2002 (aged 80); Antibes, France
- Spouse: Alice Ruth Nielsen (m. 1949)
- Issue: Count Axel; Count Birger; Count Carl Johan; Countess Désirée
- House: Glücksburg
- Father: Prince Axel of Denmark
- Mother: Princess Margaretha of Sweden

Count Flemming Valdemar Carl Axel of Rosenborg (9 March 1922 – 19 June 2002) was a former Danish prince.

== Life ==
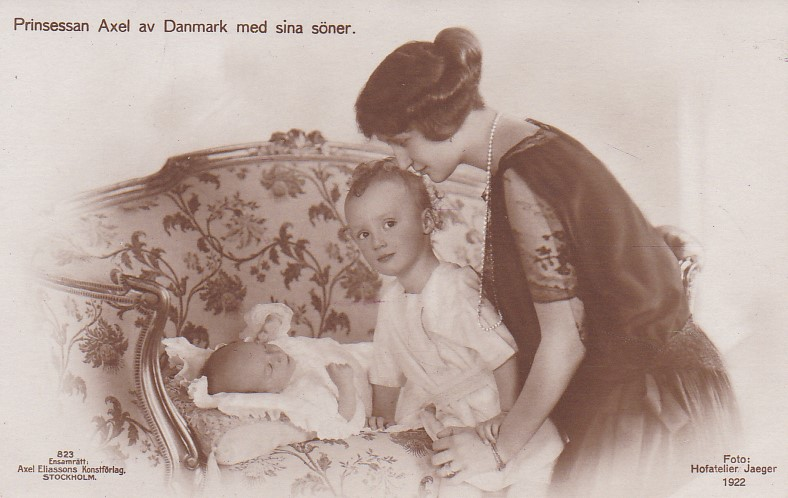
Prince Flemming with his mother and elder brother, 1922

Prince Flemming was the youngest son and child of Prince Axel of Denmark (himself a son of Prince Valdemar of Denmark) and Princess Margaretha of Sweden.

He renounced his rights to the throne and his princely title and style on 14 June 1949 and took the title of Count of Rosenborg. He served in the Royal Danish Navy as a Commander. Count Flemming of Rosenborg had four children and ten grandchildren.

=== Marriage ===
He married Alice Ruth Nielsen (Copenhagen, 8 October 1924 – 25 July 2010) in Copenhagen on 24 May 1949 and had four children.

- Count Valdemar Georg Flemming Kai Axel of Rosenborg (b. Copenhagen 24 January 1950) he married Jane Glarborg on 24 May 1975 and divorced in 1986; they had two children. He married Jutta Beck on 10 December 1988; they had two children.
- Count Birger Valdemar Georg Flemming Kai Axel of Rosenborg (b. Copenhagen, 24 January 1950) he married Minna Benedicta Tillisch on 19 October 1974 and had one daughter. He divorced in 1978 and married secondly Susanne Kristensen on 28 November 1981. They divorced in 1990. He married thirdly Lynne Denise Sharpe on 4 March 2000.
- Count Carl Johan Valdemar Georg Flemming Kai Axel of Rosenborg (b. Copenhagen, 30 May 1952) he married Dorritt Olsen on 3 September 1982 and divorced in 1986; they had one daughter. He married Colette Cabral on 19 November 1994 and divorced in 2004; they had one daughter. He married Lisa Jeanne Stollar on 20 September 2013 and they divorced in 2016.
- Countess Désirée Märtha Ingeborg of Rosenborg (b. Copenhagen, 2 February 1955); she married Fergus Stewartson Smith on 23 May 1981, they had one daughter, separated in 1984 and divorced in 1987. She married Peter Rindom on 6 February 1988 and they had two sons.

== Ancestry ==
Ancestors of Count Flemming of Rosenborg

8. Christian IX of Denmark
4. Prince Valdemar of Denmark
9. Princess Louise of Hesse-Kassel
2. Prince Axel of Denmark
10. Prince Robert, Duke of Chartres
5. Princess Marie of Orléans
11. Princess Françoise of Orléans
1. Prince Flemming of Denmark
12. Oscar II of Sweden
6. Prince Carl, Duke of Västergötland
13. Princess Sophia of Nassau
3. Princess Margaretha of Sweden
14. Frederick VIII of Denmark
7. Princess Ingeborg of Denmark
15. Princess Louise of Sweden
