= HNoMS King Haakon VII =

Norwegian Navy escort ship (1942–1951)

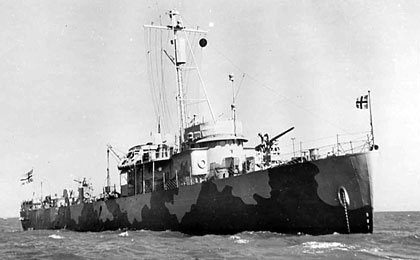
- HNoMS King Haakon VII at sea

History

Norway
- Name: King Haakon VII
- Namesake: King Haakon VII of Norway
- Ordered: 19 July 1940
- Builder: Geo. Lawley, Neponset, Massachusetts, United States
- Laid down: 22 October 1941
- Launched: 29 April 1942
- Commissioned: US Navy: 20 June 1942; Royal Norwegian Navy: 16 September 1942
- Decommissioned: 1 February 1951
- Stricken: 10 August 1957
- Fate: Sold to Rogaland Sjøguttskole (Rogaland Sailing School for boys) in August 1953

General characteristics
- Class & type: PC class
- Displacement: 357 tons
- Length: 174.75 ft (53.26 m)
- Beam: 23 ft (7.01 m)
- Draft: 7.5 ft (2.29 m)
- Propulsion: Two 10-cylinder Fairbanks-Morse diesel engines with 3,600 hp, two shafts
- Speed: 20 knots (37.04 km/h)
- Range: 4,000 nautical miles (7,408.00 km) at 16 knots (29.63 km/h)
- Complement: 47 men
- Armament: 2 × 3 in. gun; 2 × Oerlikon 20 mm cannon; 2 × .303 Colt; anti-aircraft machine guns; 2 × depth charge throwers; 60 depth charges

HNoMS King Haakon VII was a Royal Norwegian Navy escort ship during World War II, named after King Haakon VII of Norway. She was given to the RNoN by the United States on 16 September 1942, in the presence of President Franklin D. Roosevelt and Norwegian Crown Princess Märtha.

== Handover ceremony ==
The original intention of the US authorities had been to hand over the warship to the exiled Norwegians on 3 August 1942, on the 70th birthday of King Haakon VII. This plan could however not be carried out as Crown Princess Märtha was going spend that day with her father-in-law the King in London and the handover date was postponed.

During the handover ceremony Roosevelt delivered his famous "Look to Norway" speech.

King Haakon VII was formerly part of the U.S. Navy as USS PC 467. The ship was built in Neponset, Massachusetts, where she was launched on 29 April 1942.

== Norwegian service ==
HNoMS King Haakon VII, under her first commander kapteinløytnant (Lieutenant) Leif R. Lund, was first based at Halifax. Later on she was moved to Red Bay in Newfoundland and Labrador. In November 1942 she took part in the escorting of eastbound transatlantic convoy SC 108. This trip showed that the small vessel was not sturdy enough for transatlantic escorting and after a spell in the UK she relocated to St. John's, Newfoundland and Labrador in May 1943. For the rest of World War II King Haakon VII escorted convoys on the coast of North and Central America, from the coast of Labrador to the Caribbean. During her war service King Haakon VII sailed 85,000 nautical miles (157,000 km) and escorted 79 convoys without accidents. No men were lost or seriously injured on King Haakon VII during the war years. From 3 May to 2 June 1945 King Haakon VII was at Key West for maintenance and repairs, this delaying her the start of her return voyage to Norway until 4 June. On 26 June 1945 King Haakon VII arrived at the southern Norwegian port of Kristiansand.

=== Decommissioning and sale ===
She was decommissioned on 1 February 1951 and laid up in Trondheim. On 26 June 1952 the Norwegian Parliament decided that King Haakon VII was to be decommissioned and sold off. In August 1953 she was sold to Rogaland Sjøguttskole (English: Rogaland Sailing School for boys) for 30,000 kr.

== Literature ==
- Abelsen, Frank (1986). Norwegian naval ships 1939–1945 (in Norwegian and English). Oslo: Sem & Stenersen AS. ISBN 82-7046-050-8.
- Berg, Ole F. (1997). I skjærgården og på havet - Marinens krig 8. april 1940 - 8. mai 1945 (in Norwegian). Oslo: Marinens krigsveteranforening. ISBN 82-993545-2-8.
- Hansen, Ola Bøe, ed. (2005). Sjøkrigens skjebner - deres egne beretninger (in Norwegian). Gjøvik: Sjømilitære Samfund ved Forlaget Norsk Tidsskrift for Sjøvesen. ISBN 82-92217-22-3.
- Sivertsen, Svein Carl, ed. (2000). Med Kongen til fornyet kamp - Oppbyggingen av Marinen ute under Den andre verdenskrig (in Norwegian). Hundvåg: Sjømilitære Samfund ved Norsk Tidsskrift for Sjøvesen. ISBN 82-994738-8-8.
- Thomassen, Marius (1995). 90 år under rent norsk orlogsflagg (in Norwegian). Bergen: Eide Forlag. ISBN 82-514-0483-5.
