= Princess Märtha of Sweden =

Crown Princess of Norway (1901–1954)

Märtha
- Crown Princess of Norway
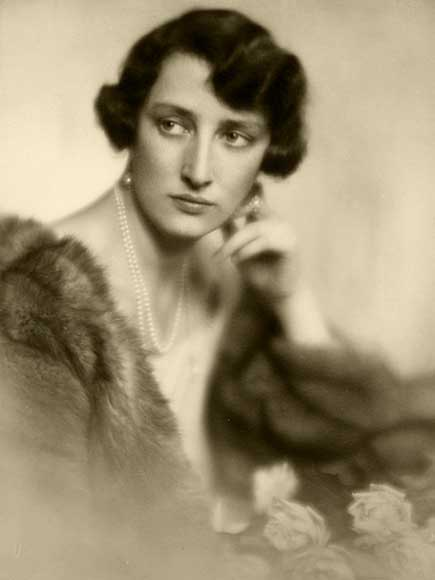
- Princess Märtha in 1929
- Born: Princess Märtha of Sweden and Norway; 28 March 1901; Palace of the Hereditary Prince, Stockholm, Sweden
- Died: 5 April 1954 (aged 53); The National Hospital, Oslo, Norway
- Burial: 21 April 1954; Royal Mausoleum, Akershus Castle, Oslo
- Spouse: Olav, Crown Prince of Norway (later Olav V) (m. 1929)
- Issue: Princess Ragnhild, Mrs. Lorentzen; Princess Astrid, Mrs. Ferner; Harald V
Names
- Märtha Sofia Lovisa Dagmar Thyra
- House: Bernadotte
- Father: Prince Carl, Duke of Västergötland
- Mother: Princess Ingeborg of Denmark

Arms of Princess Märtha of Norway and Sweden

Princess Märtha of Sweden (Märtha Sofia Lovisa Dagmar Thyra; 28 March 1901 – 5 April 1954) was Crown Princess of Norway as the wife of the future King Olav V from 1929 until her death in 1954. As Olav only became king in 1957, Märtha never became Queen of Norway. Her son, Harald V, was King of Norway from 1991 until his death in 2026. Princess Märtha was also an elder sister of Queen Astrid of Belgium and a maternal aunt of Grand Duchess Joséphine-Charlotte of Luxembourg and Kings Baudouin and Albert II of Belgium.

In 1940, Crown Princess Märtha and her family were immersed in World War II as Germany invaded Norway. After escaping to her home country of Sweden, and then being evacuated to America by President Franklin D. Roosevelt, she effectively advocated for Norway and did fundraising until the end of the war. In 1942, King Haakon VII of Norway, Märtha's father-in-law, invested her as a Dame Grand Cross of the Royal Norwegian Order of Saint Olav.

== Early life ==
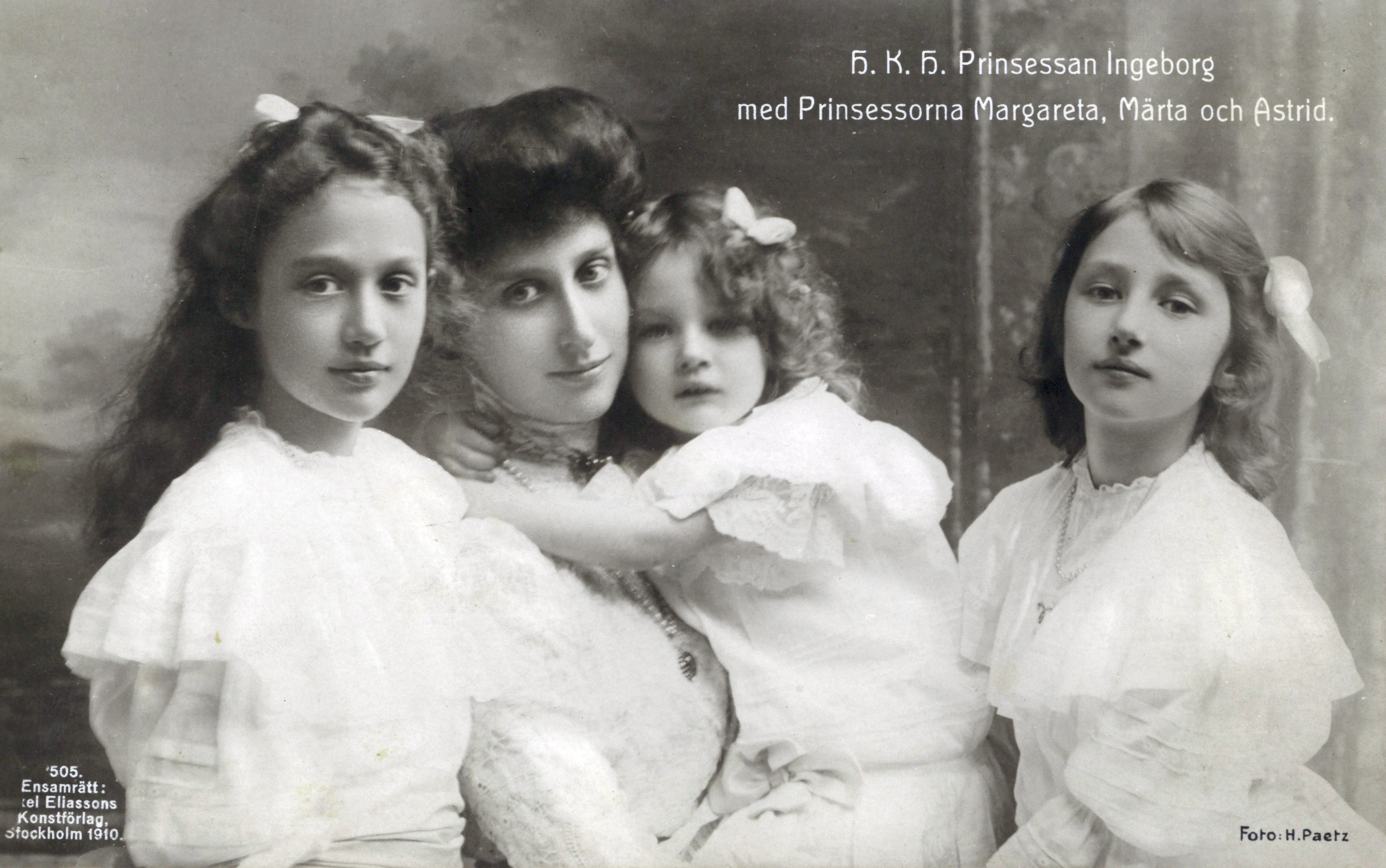
Princess Märtha (right) with her mother and sisters

Märtha was born at her parents' home of Arvfurstens Palats in Stockholm on 28 March 1901, the second child of Prince Carl of Sweden, Duke of Västergötland, and his wife Princess Ingeborg of Denmark. Her father was the younger brother of King Gustav V of Sweden, making her a first cousin twice removed of the present King of Sweden, and her mother was the younger sister of King Christian X of Denmark and of King Haakon VII of Norway.

Märtha had an elder sister, Princess Margaretha of Denmark, a younger sister, Queen Astrid of the Belgians, and a younger brother, Prince Carl Bernadotte. Märtha grew up to be much more confident and outgoing and so the daughter most admired by her mother.

As a child, Märtha was taught at home by private tutors and completed in-depth courses in childcare and first aid. She and her sisters were occasionally seen shopping unaccompanied on the streets of Stockholm.

== Crown Princess ==
During the 1928 Summer Olympics in Amsterdam, Princess Märtha of Sweden became engaged to her first cousin Prince Olav, only son and heir apparent of her uncle the King of Norway and grandson of her grandfather King Frederik VIII of Denmark's younger sister. News of the engagement was very well received: it was taken as a sign that there was no longer any tension following the dissolution of the union between Norway and Sweden. An excellent match in terms of strengthening royal ties, it was also clearly a match based on love. Initially, her younger sister, Astrid, was expected to marry Olav being younger than Olav by two years, while Märtha was two years older. Astrid was also considered more beautiful, but she instead married the future King Leopold III of Belgium.

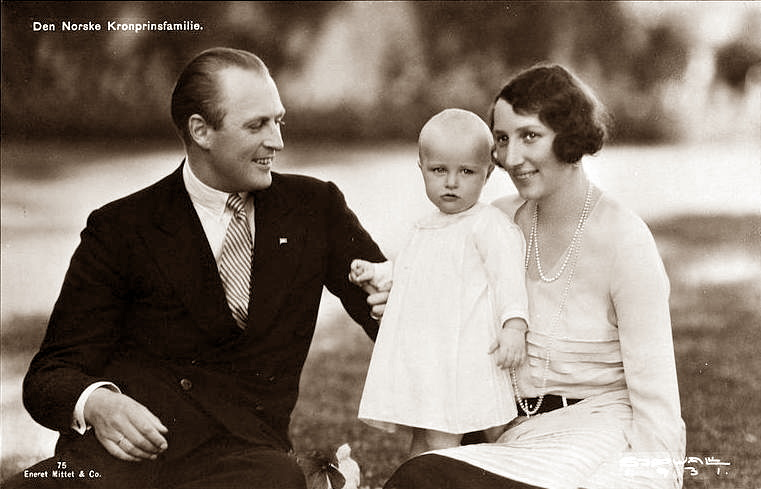
Märtha with her husband and elder daughter Princess Ragnhild

Following a year-long engagement, she married Crown Prince Olav in Oslo Cathedral on 21 March 1929. Märtha's was the first royal wedding in Norway in 340 years. The marriage is widely believed to have been a success due in large part to their genuine mutual love. They had three children: Ragnhild (1930–2012); Astrid (1932–2026); and the much awaited heir, Harald (1937–2026).

Crown Princess Märtha soon became a popular and respected member of the royal family, later undertaking a range of official engagements and also gave many speeches, unusual for royal females in that era.

Crown Prince Olav and Crown Princess Märtha resided at the country estate of Skaugum, which was a wedding gift from Baron Fritz Wedel Jarlsberg. When the main house at Skaugum was destroyed by fire in 1930, the Crown Princess took active part in its rebuilding.

Tragedy struck Crown Princess Märtha in 1935 when her sister, the Queen of the Belgians, was killed in a car crash; the two siblings had been very close. Later King Olav said that it took his wife more than ten years to come to terms with her sister's death, and he did not think that she ever really got over it. She – together with her elder sister Margaretha – became a great support for her sister's children in Belgium.

In 1939, shortly before the outbreak of World War II, the Crown Prince and Princess visited the United States. The couple befriended President Roosevelt and his wife, Eleanor. During this visit, the royal couple conducted an extensive tour of the Upper Midwest, where many Norwegian immigrants were settled. Also during their US tour, Crown Princess Märtha was initiated, together with her lady-in-waiting Ragni Østgaard, into the Delta Zeta sorority being pinned at the University of North Dakota by Delta Zeta national president Myrtle Graeter Malott.

In 1938 upon the death of her mother-in-law, Queen Maud, Crown Princess Märtha became the royal Norwegian court's senior lady.

=== World War II ===
Crown Princess Märtha contributed greatly towards Norway mobilizing for self-defence by making a public announcement on 26 January 1940 when she encouraged Norwegian women to participate in the mobilization work. During the flight from the German invasion in 9–10 April 1940, the Norwegian government decided that the Crown Princess and her children were to flee across the border to her native Sweden while her husband and father-in-law remained. Upon their arrival at the Swedish border, they were first denied entry because they could not provide passports; she then instructed her driver to run through the border gate, thus gaining entry into her native Sweden.

In Sweden, she stayed at first at a tourist hotel in Sälen, before travelling on to Stockholm where her parents and relatives lived. Her presence in Sweden became problematic where some considered her presence to put Sweden's neutrality in jeopardy. President Roosevelt then offered her a personal invitation to the United States. Her uncle, King Gustav V of Sweden, telegraphed her father-in-law King Haakon and advised against the trip, but Märtha insisted on accepting the invitation. Roosevelt sent the US Army transport American Legion to the then-Finnish port city of Petsamo to pick her up. In the U.S., she and her children initially stayed at the White House. Crown Prince Olav, however, accompanied his father to the United Kingdom with the Norwegian government-in-exile. Thus the Norwegian royal couple, like many other couples during that time, were separated for much of the war.

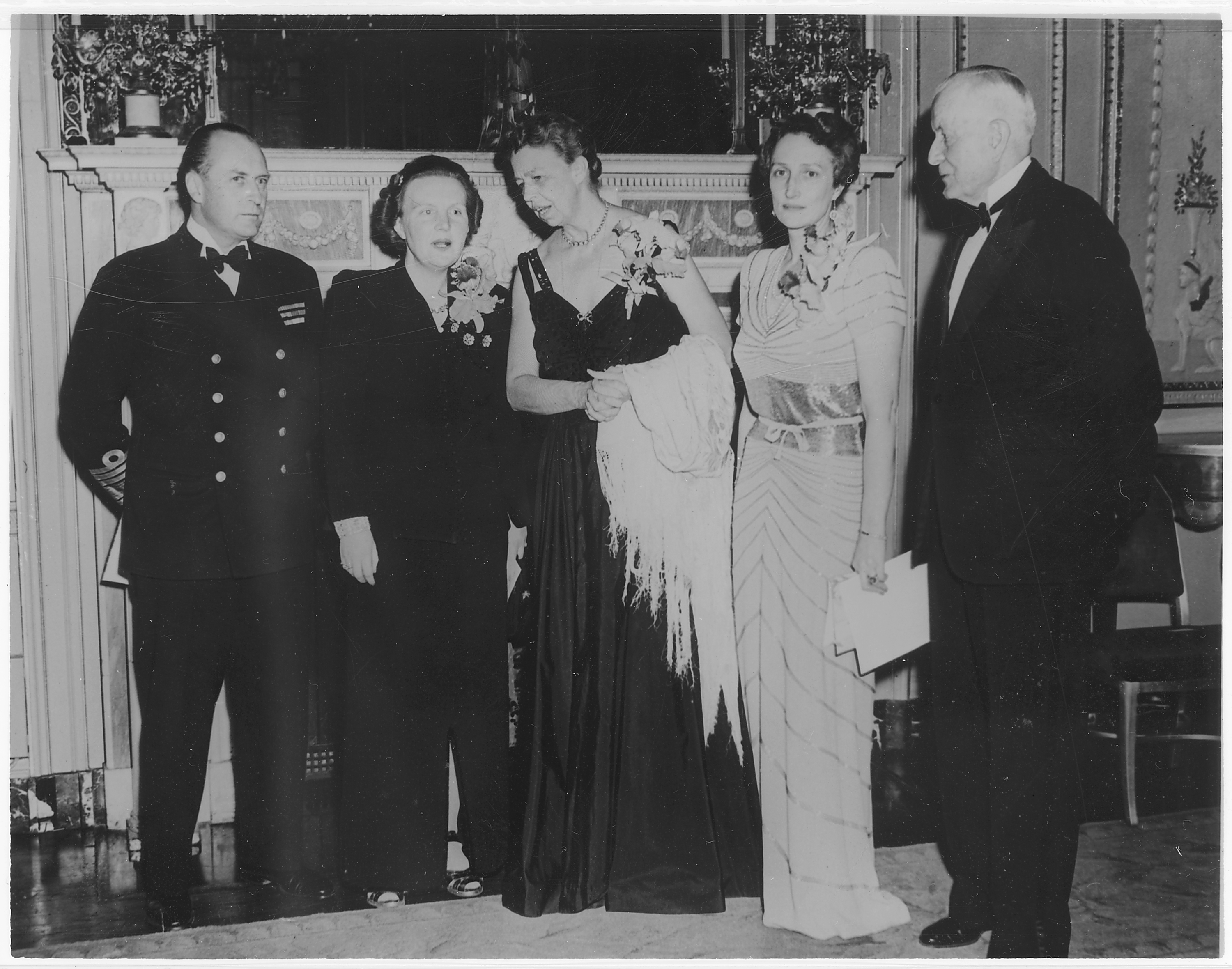
Crown Princess Märtha (2nd from right) in 1944, with (from left to right) her husband Crown Prince Olav, Princess Juliana of the Netherlands, Eleanor Roosevelt (centre), and Thomas J. Watson

In August 1941, Crown Princess Märtha travelled with President Roosevelt aboard the presidential yacht, USS Potomac, and sailed to Newfoundland and the Atlantic Charter meetings with Winston Churchill.

The friendship that the Crown Prince and Crown Princess had cultivated with the Roosevelts was further developed during the war years. In 1942, the US presented the exiled Norwegian forces with the gift of the submarine chaser HNoMS King Haakon VII. This ship was launched by Crown Princess Märtha, when she gave a speech in support of Norwegian liberation. Her work to assist the American Red Cross and on behalf of Norwegian interests greatly impressed Roosevelt and influenced his "Look to Norway" speech in 1942. Novelist and essayist Gore Vidal later asserted that Crown Princess Märtha was Roosevelt's "last love". Roosevelt's son James stated that "There was no question that Martha was an important figure in Father's life during the war ... there is a real possibility that a true romantic relationship developed between the president and the princess." Roald Dahl, later a well-known author and then a young RAF fighter pilot assigned to Washington, seems to have agreed: "Dahl was inclined to think that all the smoke indicated a real fire ... [Dahl wrote] 'The President has it in his mind that he would like to sleep with her.'"

Princess Märtha spent much of World War II in the United States, where she worked tirelessly to keep up support for Norway among the American public and government. Trygve Lie wrote about her war-work:

"During those years of struggle, she was undeniably Norway's Ambassador Number 1, because of her charm, humanity, wisdom and tact. As Secretary of Foreign Affairs I had to turn to her many times, and the results she achieved and the advice she offered, were always of value."

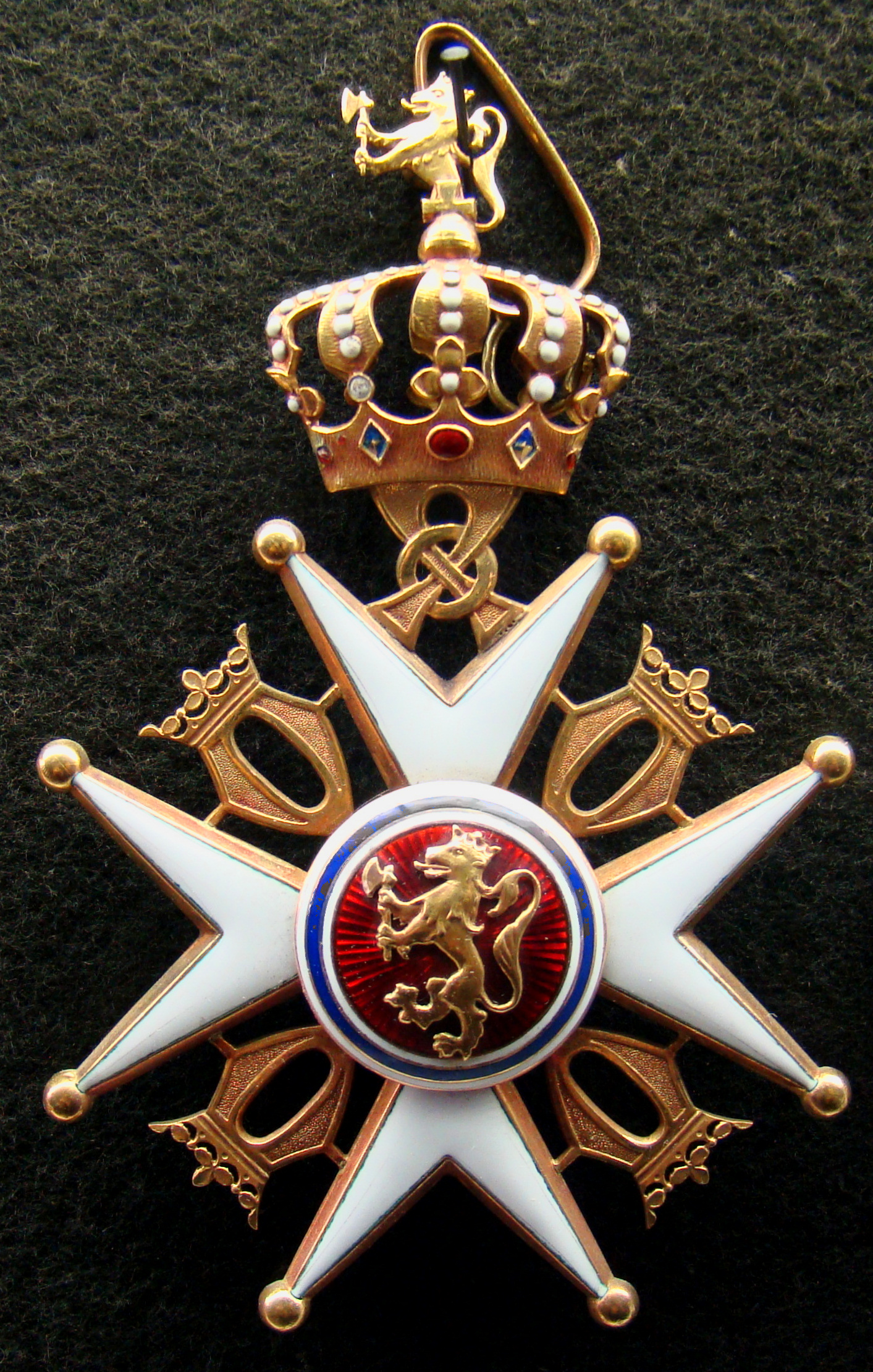
Grand Cross of the Royal Norwegian Order of Saint Olav

In 1942, during her father-in-law's birthday celebrations in London, Märtha was invested by him as a Dame Grand Cross of the Royal Norwegian Order of Saint Olav, stating that her appointment to the order was "not because you are a Crown Princess, but because you have earned it."

=== Post-war period ===
Upon her return to Norway in 1945 after World War II, Crown Princess Märtha received a warm public welcome and was called the "Mother of the Nation". In her role as Crown Princess, she worked to support the stability and well-being of the Norwegian people.

As King Haakon's health declined, the Crown Prince and Crown Princess assumed a growing number of official engagements. The Crown Princess became involved in many official tasks, and even made the annual New Year's Eve speeches in 1946 and 1950.

After the war, Crown Princess Märtha suffered from poor health.

== Death ==
Following a lengthy period of ill-health, Märtha died aged 53 at The National Hospital in Oslo on 5 April 1954 and was buried in the royal mausoleum at Akershus Fortress. Her cause of death is disputed, though it is often attributed to cancer or hepatitis.

Her death came while her elder daughter Princess Ragnhild was expecting her first child and just over three years before her husband became king.

== Legacy ==
A 970,000 km² area in Antarctica is named Princess Martha Coast in her honor.

A statue of the princess, created by Kirsten Kokkin was erected outside the Norwegian embassy in Washington, D.C., in 2005. In 2007, a replica of the statue was erected in the courtyard of the Royal Palace in Oslo. A third replica was erected outside The Norwegian Seamen`s Church in Stockholm, Sweden, unveiled by her daughter, Princess Astrid in 2008. This church, Kronprinsesse Märthas kirke is named after her.

Crown Princess Märtha's Memorial Fund is a charitable trust administered by the Norwegian Crown. The Crown Princess's youngest daughter, Princess Astrid, served as chairperson. Initially established as Her Royal Highness Crown Princess Märtha's Fund on 1 April 1929, the fund "is to provide financial support to social and humanitarian initiatives carried out by non-governmental organizations." In 2005, the Fund had assets of approximately 28 million Norwegian krone (NOK), and issued grants totaling about 1.5 million NOK for roughly 300 recipients.

Her son King Harald V named his daughter Princess Märtha Louise after her grandmother.

The popular Swedish layer Princess cake was named for Märtha and her two sisters when they were children.

The ship MS «Kronprinsesse Märtha», launched in 1929, was named after her. This ship which helped to save hundreds of passengers from the sinking German cruise ship Dresden in 1934 has, since 2000, been used as a hotel ship in Stockholm.

Märtha is depicted in the historical docudrama television miniseries Atlantic Crossing, a co-production of Cinenord and the state broadcaster, NRK.

== Ancestry ==
Ancestors of Princess Märtha of Sweden

8. Oscar I of Sweden
4. Oscar II of Sweden
9. Princess Joséphine of Leuchtenberg
2. Prince Carl, Duke of Västergötland
10. William, Duke of Nassau
5. Princess Sophia of Nassau
11. Princess Pauline of Württemberg
1. Princess Märtha of Sweden
12. Christian IX of Denmark
6. Frederik VIII of Denmark
13. Princess Louise of Hesse-Kassel
3. Princess Ingeborg of Denmark
14. Charles XV of Sweden
7. Princess Louise of Sweden
15. Princess Louise of the Netherlands
