= Marie d'Orléans =

Marie d'Orléans (Marie of Orléans) may refer to:

- Marie of Orléans (1457–1493), daughter of Charles, Duke of Orléans (1394–1465), sister of Louis XII
- Marie d'Orleans-Longueville, Duchess de Nemours (1625–1707), daughter of Duke of Longueville, stepdaughter of Anne Genevieve of Bourbon-Condé
- Marie Louise d'Orléans (1662–1689), eldest daughter of Philippe de France and Princess Henrietta Anne of England; later Queen of Spain as wife of Charles II
- Princess Marie Louise Élisabeth d'Orléans (1695–1719), daughter of Philippe II, Duke of Orléans, wife of Charles, Duke of Berry (1686–1714)
- Maria Amalia of Naples and Sicily (1782–1866), who became Duchess of Orléans
- Princess Marie of Orléans (1813–1839), daughter of Louis-Philippe of France (1773–1850) and Maria Amalia of Naples and Sicily
- Princess Marie Isabelle of Orléans (1848–1919)
- Marie of Orléans (1865–1909), cousin of the above and daughter of Robert, Duke of Chartres
- Princess Marie Louise of Orléans (1896–1973), daughter of Prince Emmanuel, Duke of Vendôme and Princess Henriette of Belgium
