= Astrid of Sweden =

Queen of the Belgians from 1934 to 1935

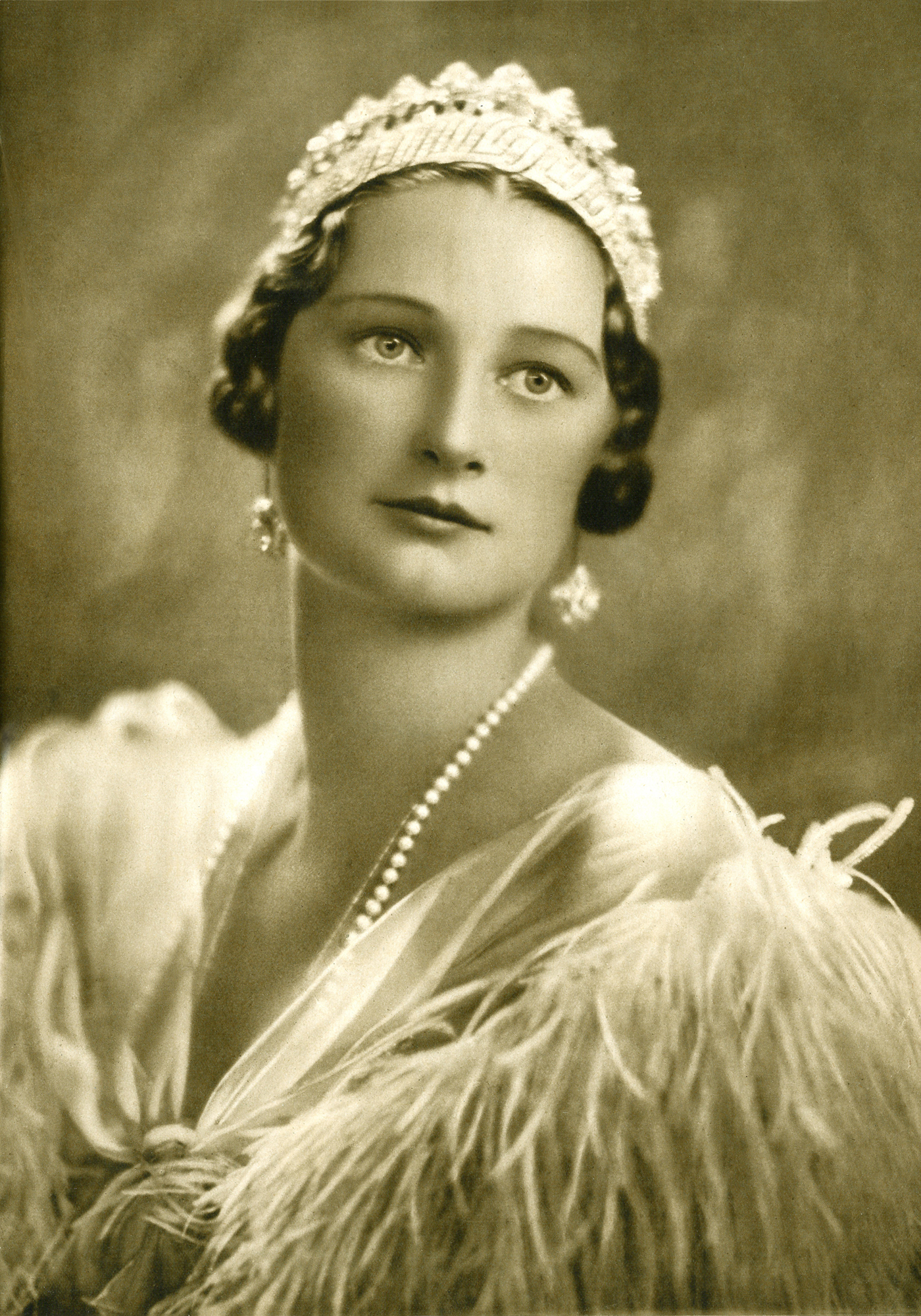
- Queen Astrid in 1935

Queen consort of the Belgians
- Tenure: 23 February 1934 – 29 August 1935
- Born: 17 November 1905; Arvfurstens palats, Stockholm, Sweden
- Died: 29 August 1935 (aged 29); Küssnacht am Rigi, Schwyz, Switzerland
- Burial: 3 September 1935; Church of Our Lady of Laeken, Brussels, Belgium
- Spouse: Leopold III of Belgium (m. 1926)
- Issue: Joséphine-Charlotte, Grand Duchess of Luxembourg; Baudouin, King of the Belgians; Albert II, King of the Belgians
Names
- Astrid Sofia Lovisa Thyra
- House: Bernadotte
- Father: Prince Carl, Duke of Västergötland
- Mother: Princess Ingeborg of Denmark

Astrid of Sweden (Astrid Sofia Lovisa Thyra; 17 November 1905 – 29 August 1935) was Queen of the Belgians as the first wife of King Leopold III.

Born a member of the Swedish House of Bernadotte, she married Leopold, then-Duke of Brabant, in 1926. They had three children. Their daughter, Joséphine-Charlotte, later became the Grand Duchess Consort of Luxembourg, while their sons both ascended the throne as King of the Belgians. Their son King Albert II named his first daughter, Princess Astrid of Belgium, after his mother.

== Early life ==
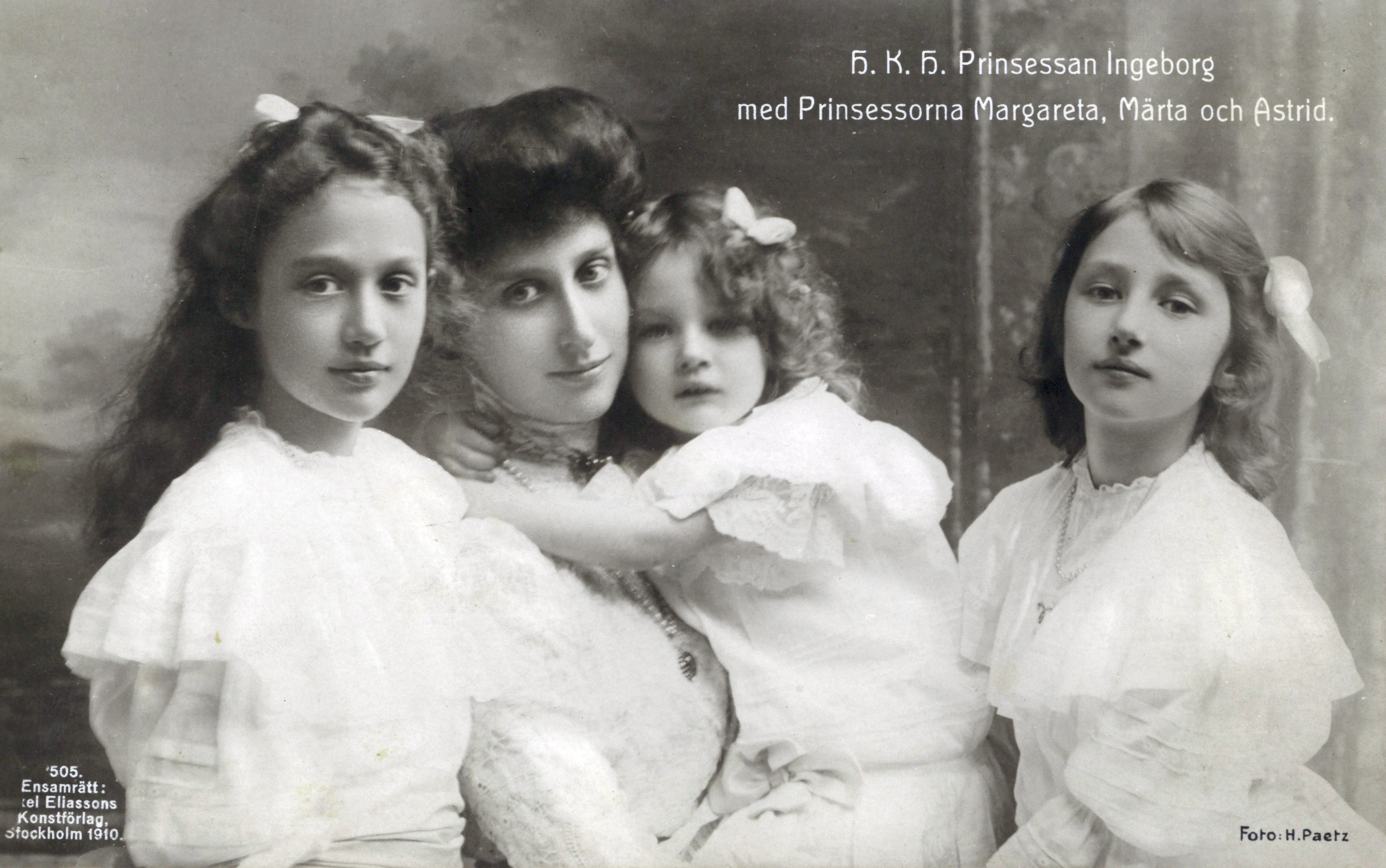
Princess Astrid (centre) with her mother Princess Ingeborg and two sisters, Princess Margaretha (left) and Princess Märtha (right).

Princess Astrid was born on 17 November 1905 at her parents' then-residence, the Arvfurstens Palats at Gustav Adolfs Torg in central Stockholm. She was the third child and youngest daughter of Prince Carl, Duke of Västergötland, and his wife, Princess Ingeborg of Denmark. Her father was the third son of Oscar II, King of Sweden and Norway, by his wife, Sophia of Nassau, and was a younger brother of King Gustav V of Sweden. Astrid’s mother was a daughter of King Frederik VIII of Denmark by his wife, Louise of Sweden, and the younger sister of kings Christian X of Denmark and Haakon VII of Norway.

Astrid had two elder sisters, Margaretha, Princess Axel of Denmark, and Märtha, Crown Princess of Norway, as well as a younger brother, Prince Carl Bernadotte (prev. Prince Carl of Sweden, Duke of Östergötland).

Astrid grew up with her sisters and younger brother at Byström's Villa (also known as Prince Carl's Palace) on the island Djurgården in central Stockholm until 1923, when the family had to leave the house for financial reasons. After 1909, holidays were spent at the family's summer residence Villa Fridhem' by Bråviken, a bay of the Baltic Sea near Norrköping. Astrid was raised with a strict education and little luxury. She attended the Sint Botvid boarding school, where lessons were taught in French, then went on to the Akerstrom-Soderstrom finishing school, where she studied sewing, piano, ballet and childcare. After she finished school, Astrid worked at a Stockholm orphanage where she cared for children.

== Engagement and wedding ==
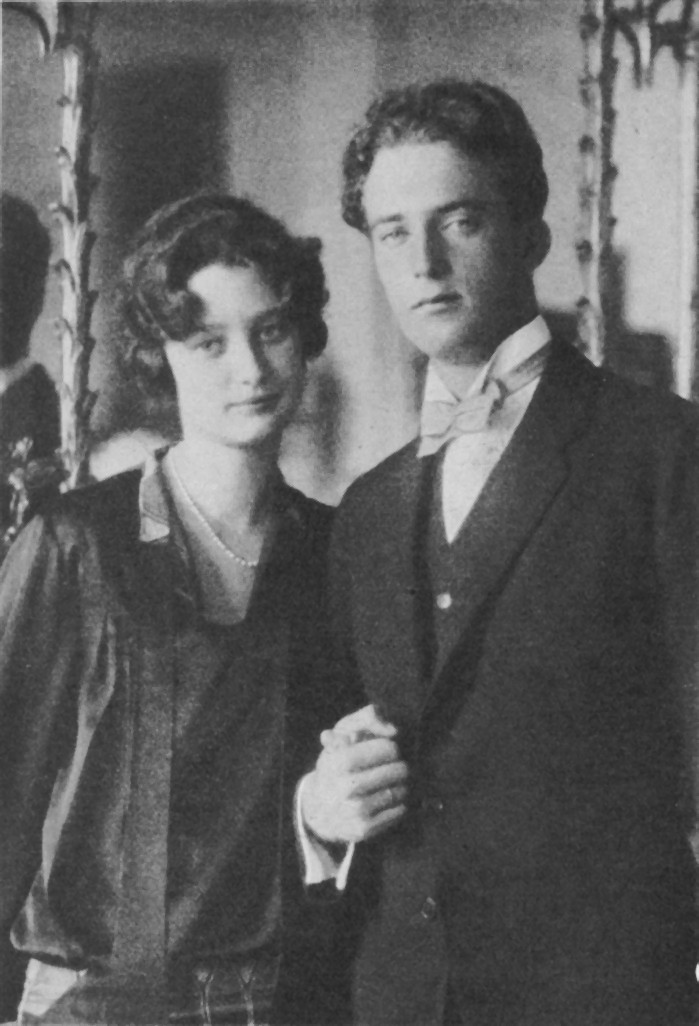
Astrid and Leopold's engagement photograph

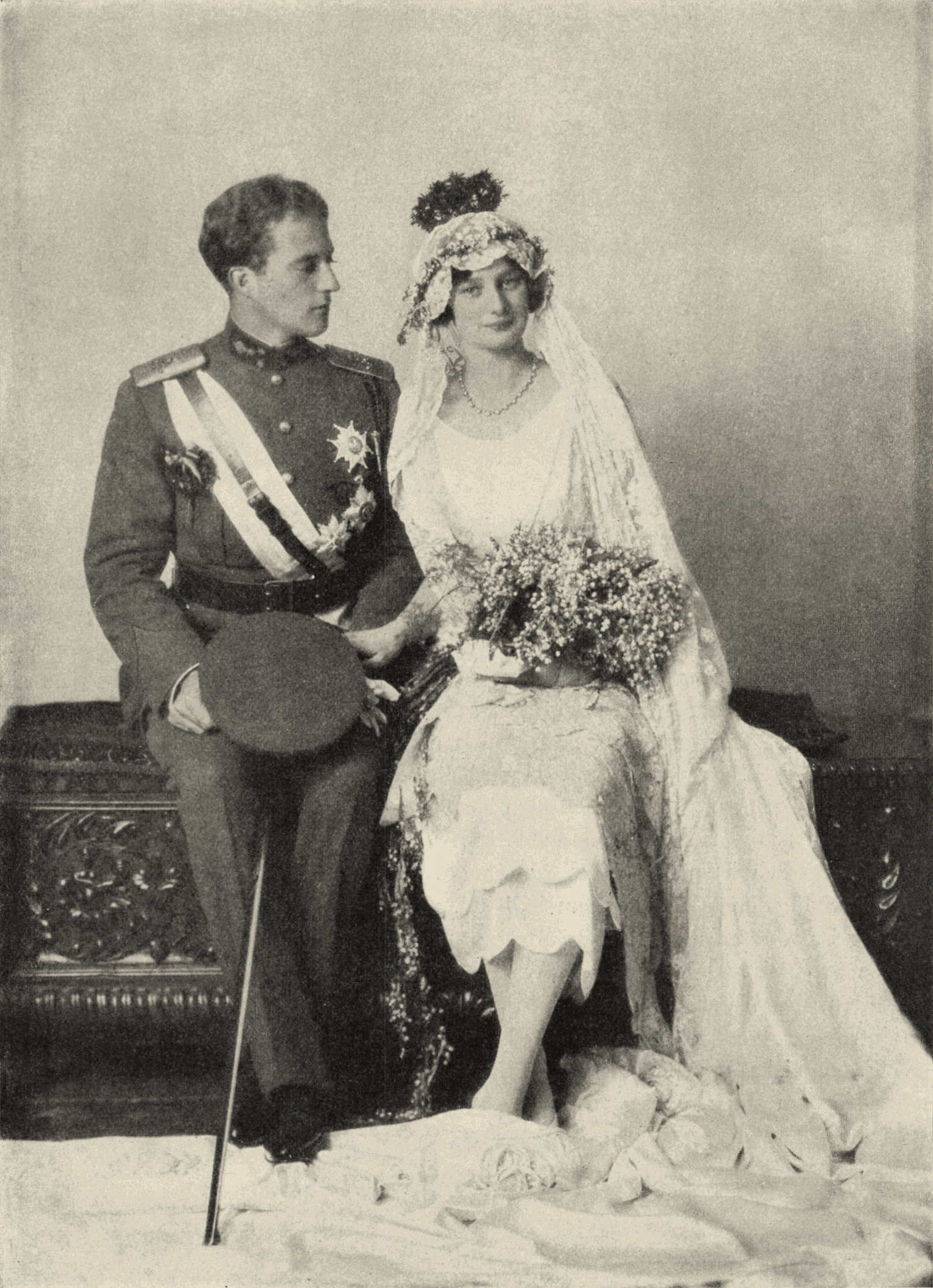
Astrid and Leopold on their wedding day

Due to her royal status, Astrid was named as a potential bride for a number of princes, including the future Edward VIII of the United Kingdom and the future Olav V of Norway.

In September 1926, her engagement with Prince Leopold of Belgium, Duke of Brabant was announced. The King said: "The Queen and I would like to announce to you the impending marriage between Prince Leopold, Duke of Brabant, and Princess Astrid of Sweden. We are convinced that the princess will bring joy and happiness to our son. Leopold and Astrid have decided to join their lives without any pressures or reasons of state. Theirs is a true union among people with the same inclinations." Queen Elizabeth said: "It is a marriage of love... tell it to our people. Nothing was arranged. Not a single political consideration prevailed in our son's decision."

Princess Astrid entered into a civil marriage with Prince Leopold in Stockholm on 4 November 1926, and the pair were married religiously in Cathedral of St. Michael and St. Gudula, Brussels on 10 November 1926. The couple travelled separately to Antwerp after their civil marriage and reunited in Belgium. The religious marriage was attended by a large wedding party of young friends and relatives: Princess Feodora of Denmark, Princess Marie-José of Belgium, Princess Märtha of Sweden, Princess Ingrid of Sweden, Alfhild Ekelund, Prince Carl of Sweden, Prince Gustav Adolf of Sweden, Crown Prince Olav of Norway, Margareta Stähl, Count Claes Sparre, Anna Adelswärd, Prince Charles of Belgium, Count Folke Bernadotte, Baron Sigvard Beck-Friis, Anne Marie von Essen, and Baron Carl Strömfelt.

Princess Astrid was given a tiara created by Belgian jeweler Van Bever as a wedding gift from the Belgian government. The original version of the diadem is a flexible diamond bandeau in a stylized Greek key motif topped with 11 large diamonds on spikes. These large stones, totaling around 100 carats on their own, symbolized the nine provinces of Belgium and the now former Belgian colony of the Congo. She later added a set of diamond arches to enclose each of the 11 independent stones. After Astrid's death, the tiara was in King Leopold's possession, and his second wife Lilian, Princess of Réthy wore parts of the tiara, but not the full set of gems, as Lilian never held the title of Queen. Leopold abdicated the throne in favor of his son Baudouin; when Baudouin married, Leopold gave the tiara to the new queen, Fabiola, who wore it on her wedding day. She handed the jewel over after Baudouin's death to be worn by Queen Paola who, after the abdication of her husband Albert, gave it to Mathilde, the new Queen of the Belgians.

== Duchess of Brabant ==
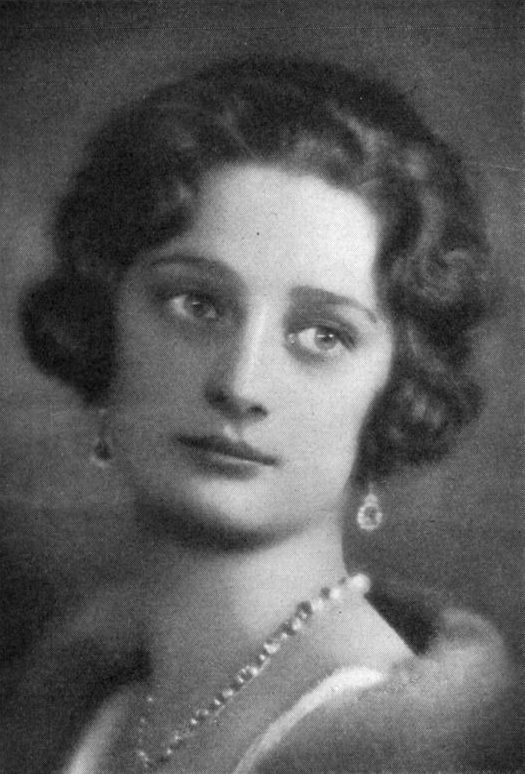
Astrid as Duchess of Brabant in 1926

The Duke and Duchess of Brabant spent their honeymoon in the south of France before moving into a wing of the Royal Palace of Brussels. After the honeymoon period, Princess Astrid began learning French and Dutch. Astrid was enthusiastically adopted by the Belgians for her beauty, charm and simplicity. As the Duchess of Brabant, she worked to alleviate various forms of adversity.

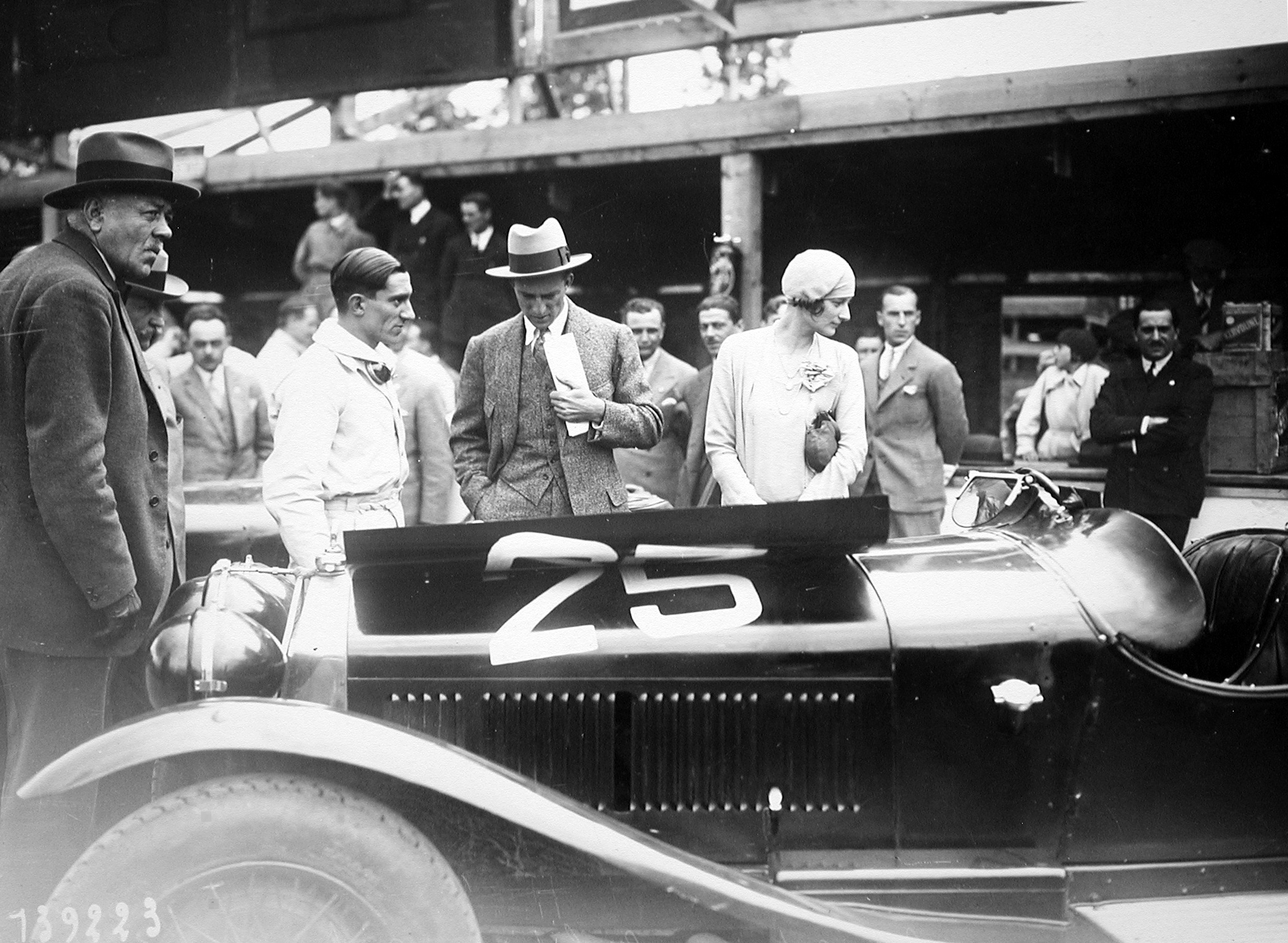
Astrid and Leopold visiting Alfa Romeo in Italy

In October 1927, Leopold and Astrid had a daughter, Princess Joséphine-Charlotte, later Grand Duchess of Luxembourg and mother of Henri, Grand Duke of Luxembourg. The birth of Joséphine-Charlotte was a difficult period for Astrid, as women were barred from the line of succession to the throne. One year later, she and her husband visited the Dutch East Indies, now Indonesia. They arrived on the ship Insulinde. When the couple visited Surakarta, Astrid and her husband received a box with a golden kris inside as a present from the Dutch East Indies government. Princess Astrid received a box with a fan inlaid with gold inside as a gift. Local people admired Princess Astrid's warm, enthusiastic, and less formal attitude. The couple visited Radio Poestoko Museum and Societet Habiprojo, where they watched a wayang show. They also visited Surabaya and Bali. After having spent five months in the Dutch East Indies, the couple travelled back to Belgium on the ship Tjerimai. Upon their return, the couple moved into Stuyvenberg Castle. In September 1930, Astrid gave birth to Prince Baudouin, who eventually became King of the Belgians.

Raised as a Lutheran, Astrid converted to Catholicism after marrying Leopold. She had considered converting to Catholicism earlier, as it was the official religion of Belgium, but delayed her conversion after consulting with Fr William Hemmick, who told her to wait until she genuinely believed it was the true religion. Astrid converted to Catholicism in 1930, confiding to a close childhood friend: "My soul has found peace." On the day of Astrid's conversion, her father-in-law King Albert I said: "I am glad, very glad. Now all the family is united in the same religion."

In 1932, Astrid and her husband traveled to Asia and the Congo. According to a May 1933 print of De Locomotief, the photographs of their visit to the Dutch East Indies were published as a collection in a book titled De Reis van Prins Leopold door Ned-Indie. After their visit to the Congo, Astrid wrote to her friend Countess Anna Sparre (née Baroness Anna Adelswärd) about the majestic landscapes of Congo land and her concerns about suffering, poverty and infant mortality that the Congolese faced.

The Duchess of Brabant became a godmother to Anna Sparre's daughter, Christina, and her sister Crown Princess Märtha's second daughter, Princess Astrid.

== Queen ==
On 17 February 1934, King Albert I died in a mountain-climbing accident in Marche-les-Dames, Belgium. Leopold and Astrid became the new King and Queen of the Belgians. Later that year, the third child of Leopold and Astrid was born. He was named Albert after his grandfather, and would eventually succeed his brother Baudouin as King of the Belgians. The present King of the Belgians, Philippe, is Albert's son.

As Queen of the Belgians, Astrid dedicated her time to raising her children and promoting social causes that brought her into contact with the Belgians. She was concerned by the situations of women, children, and disadvantaged people. During an economic crisis in Belgium in 1935 she organized the collection of clothing, money and food for the poor through an open letter, published as the "Queen’s Appeal." Queen Astrid also visited poor settlements in Belgium.

Queen Astrid was particularly interested in training women formally in childcare and healthcare. She also supported the training of young girls as dressmakers to better their career opportunities. She supported Catholic charitable institutions, such as the Sisters of St. Vincent de Paul, and liberal organizations, such as the Fédération des Foyers Belges. She also gave audiences to advocates of women's rights such as Baroness Marthe Boël, president of the National Council of Belgian Women.

In May 1935, Queen Astrid patronized Milk Week, an effort to encourage Belgians to drink healthy beverages. She charged Gatien du Parc, one of her courtiers, with the task of preparing a detailed report on milk regulations in foreign countries after a strict investigation. Queen Astrid often did charitable works as part of a Relief Committee.

The Queen Astrid at the Royal Palace in Bruxelles in 1934 (by Willem van de Poll)

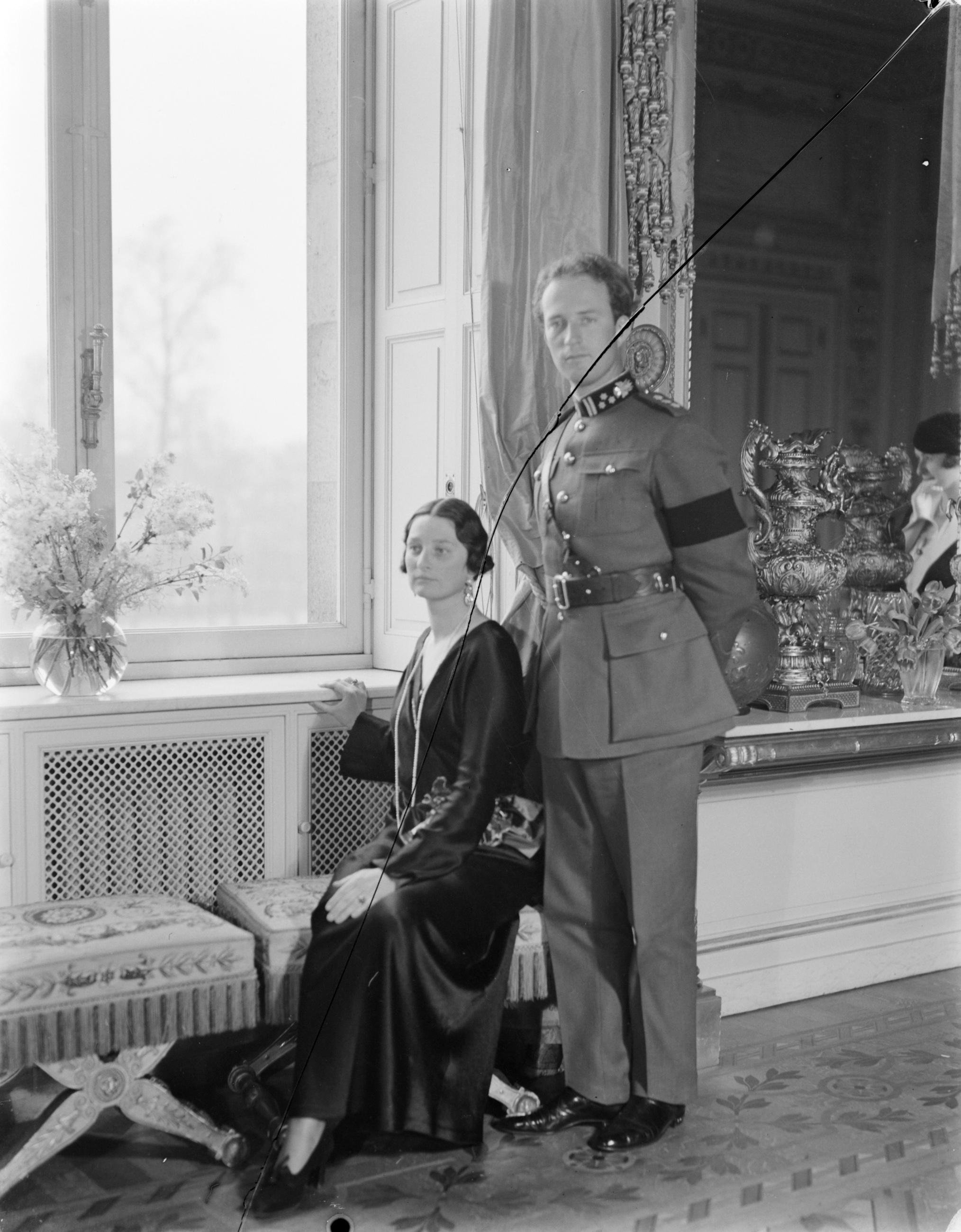

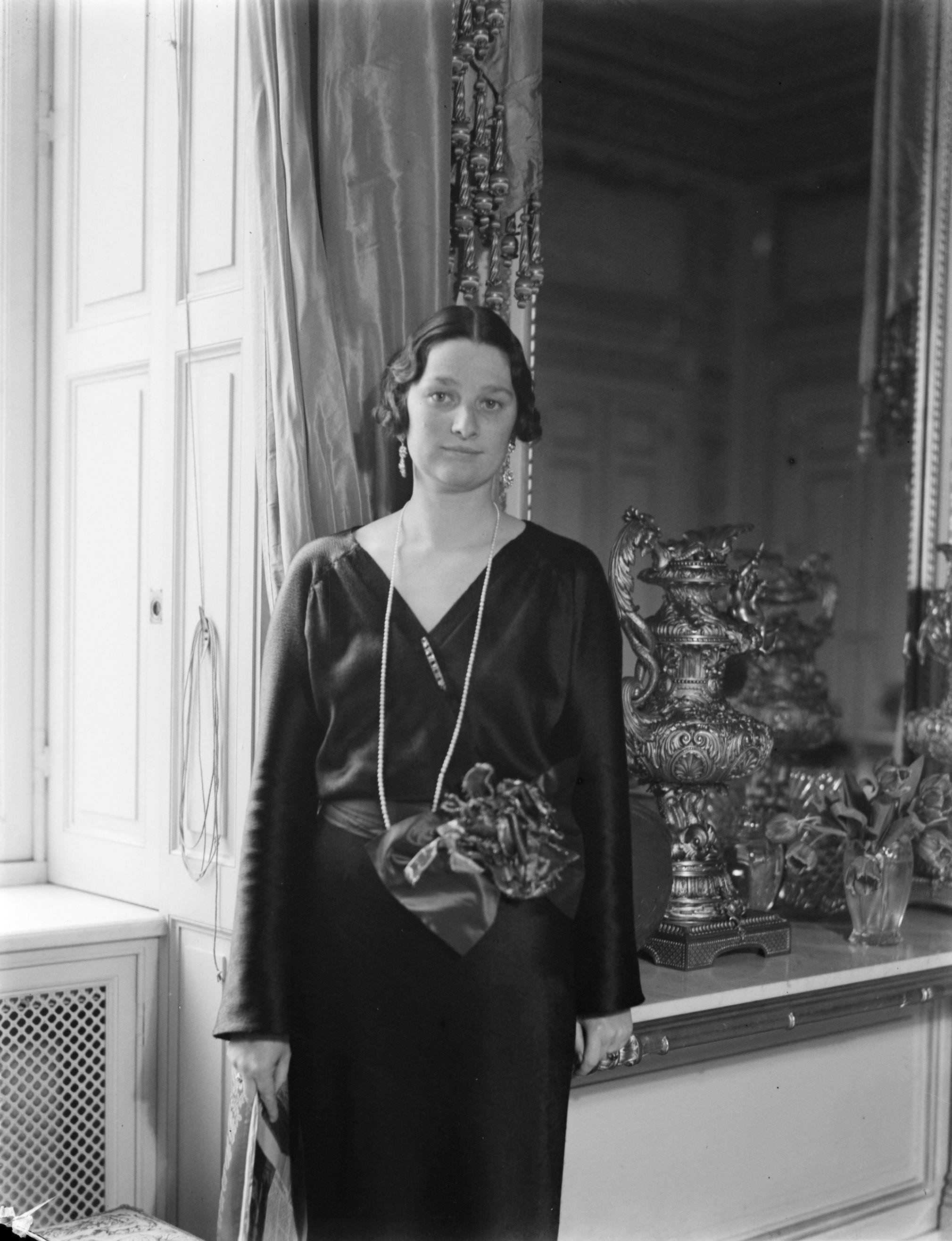

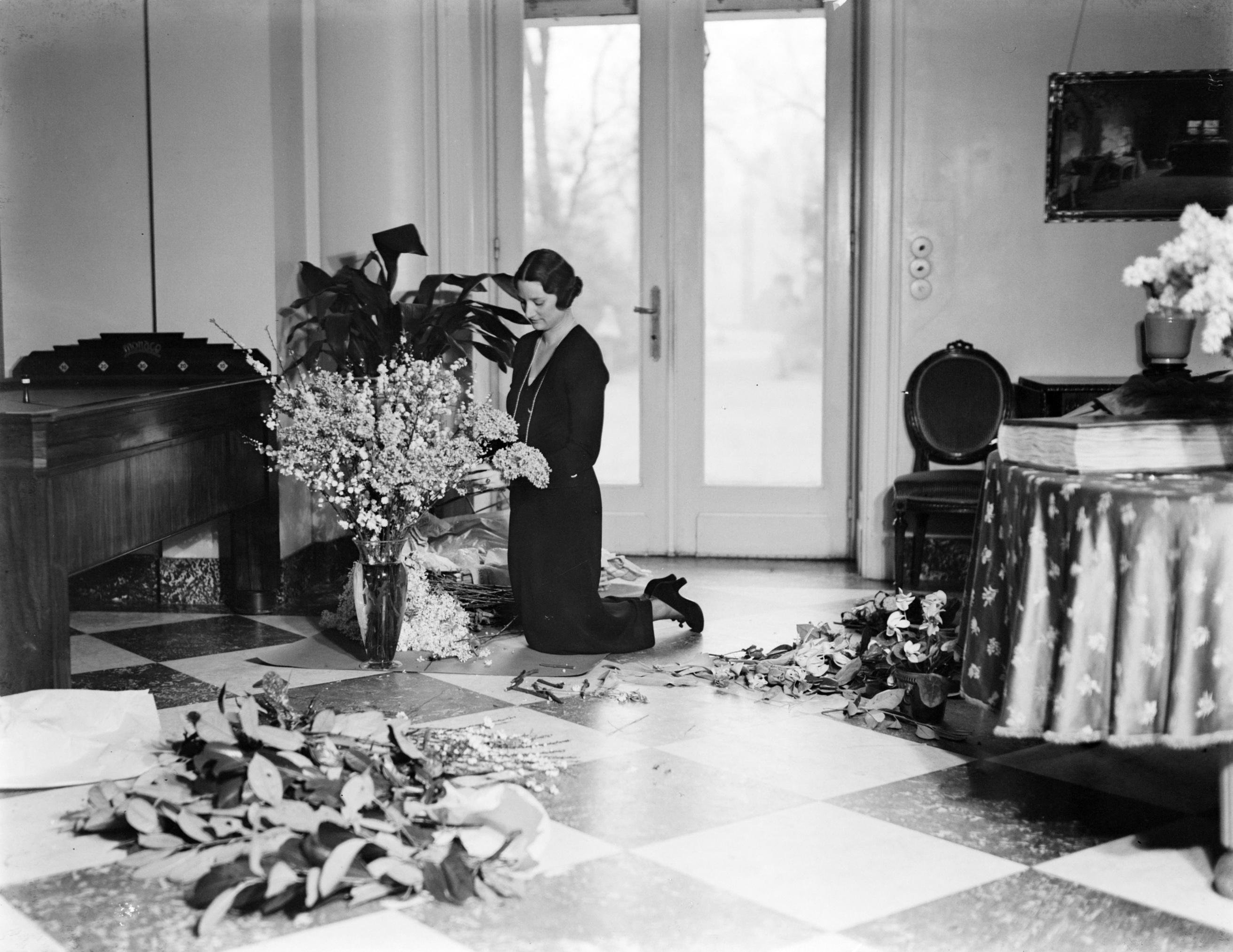

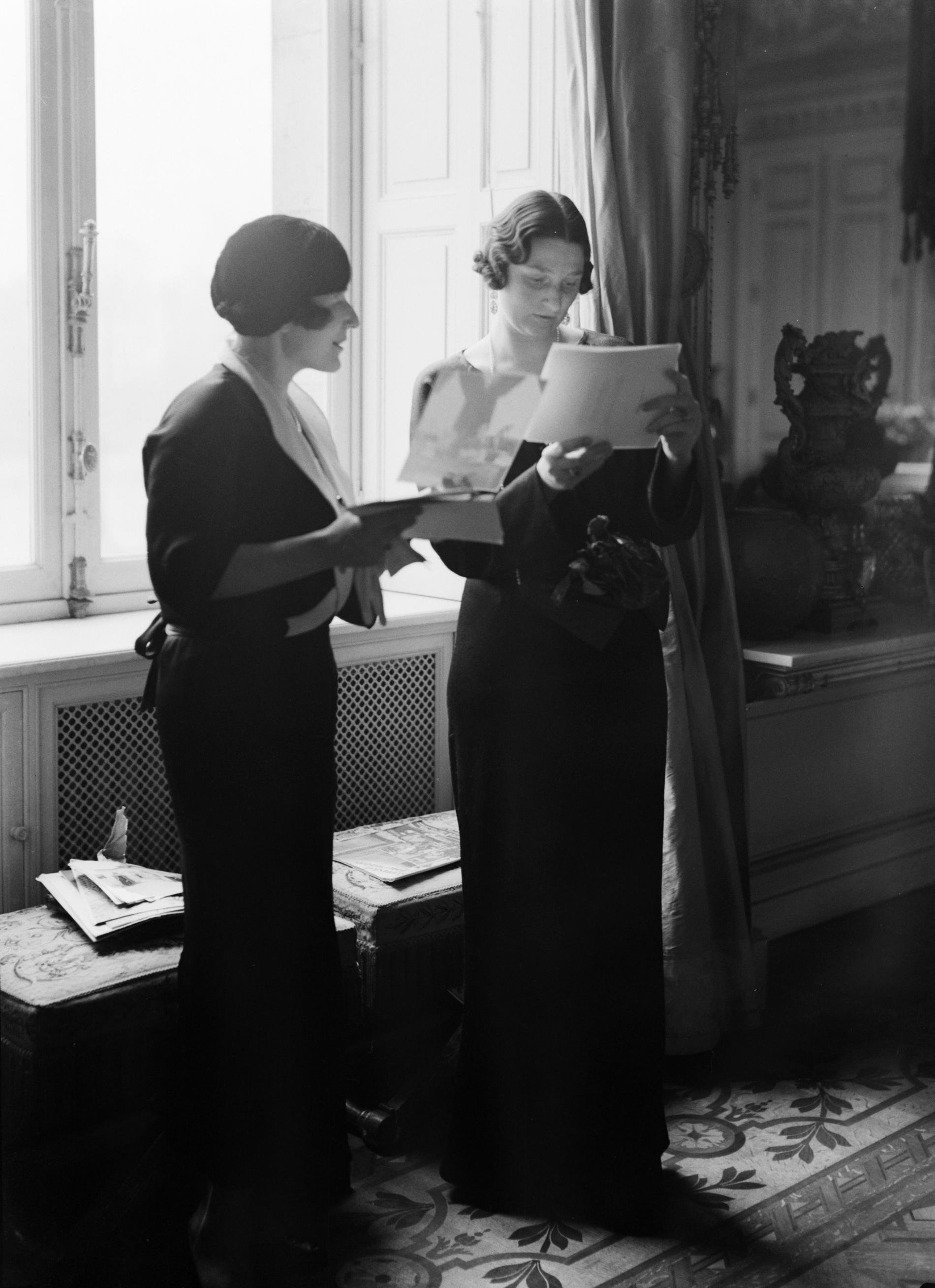

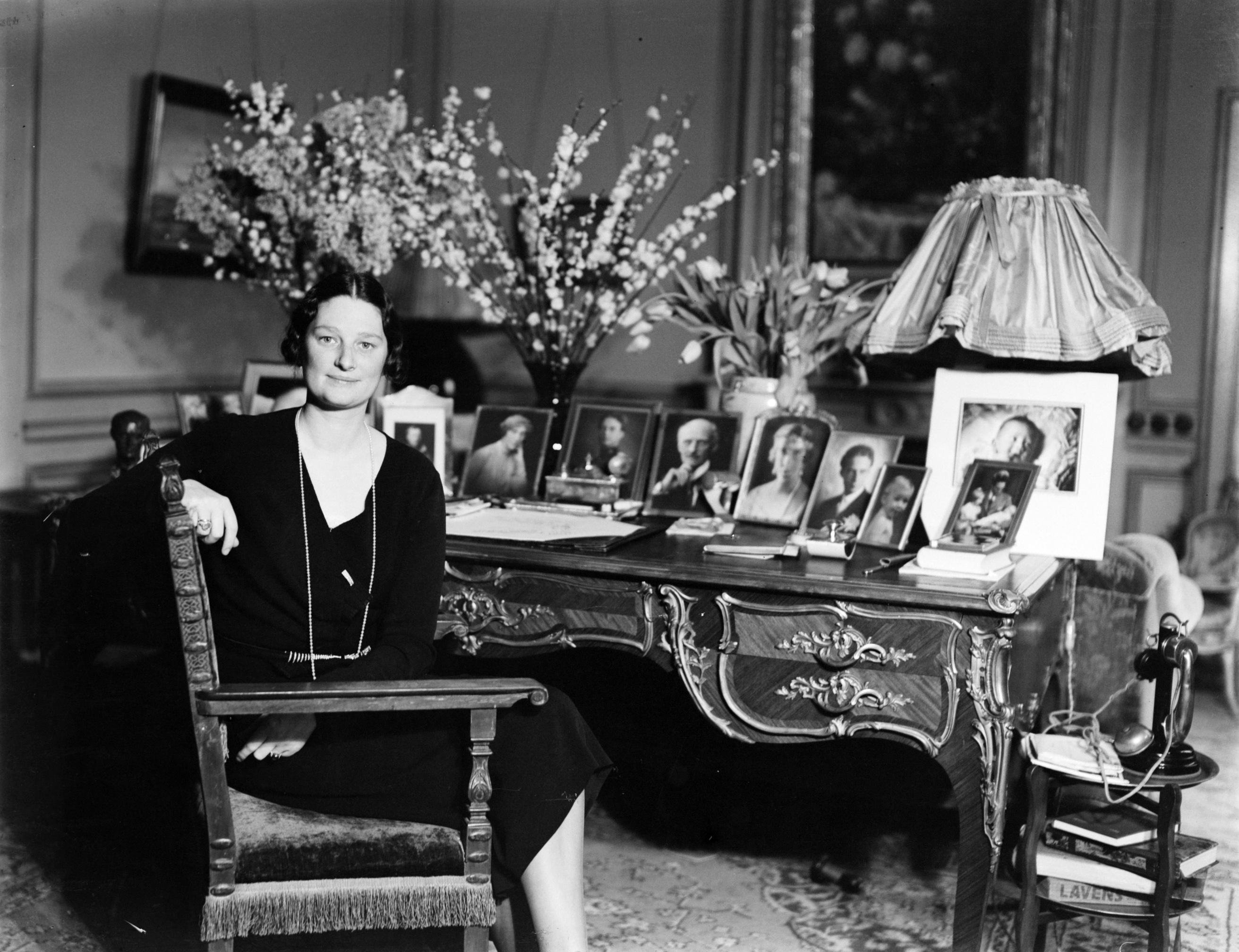

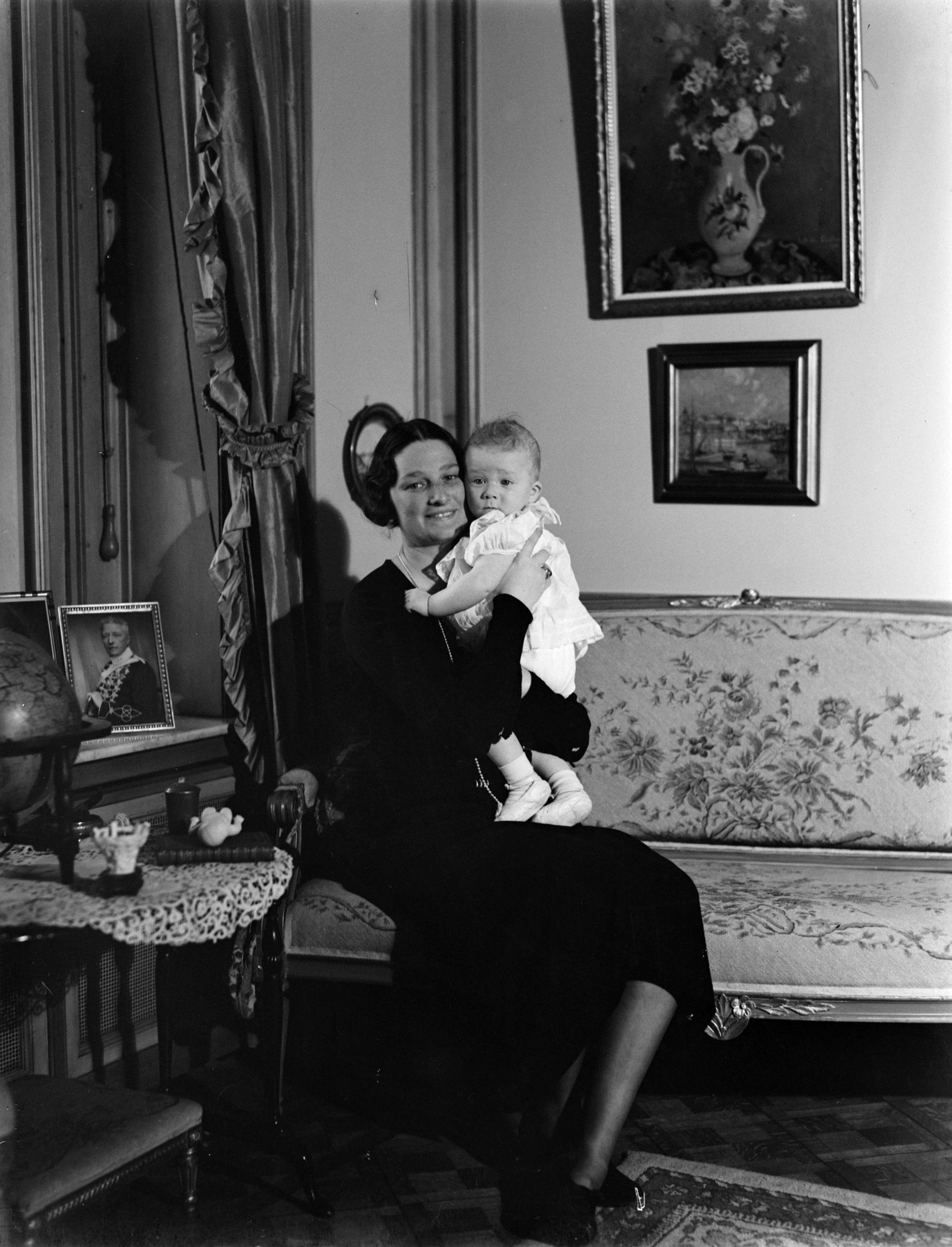

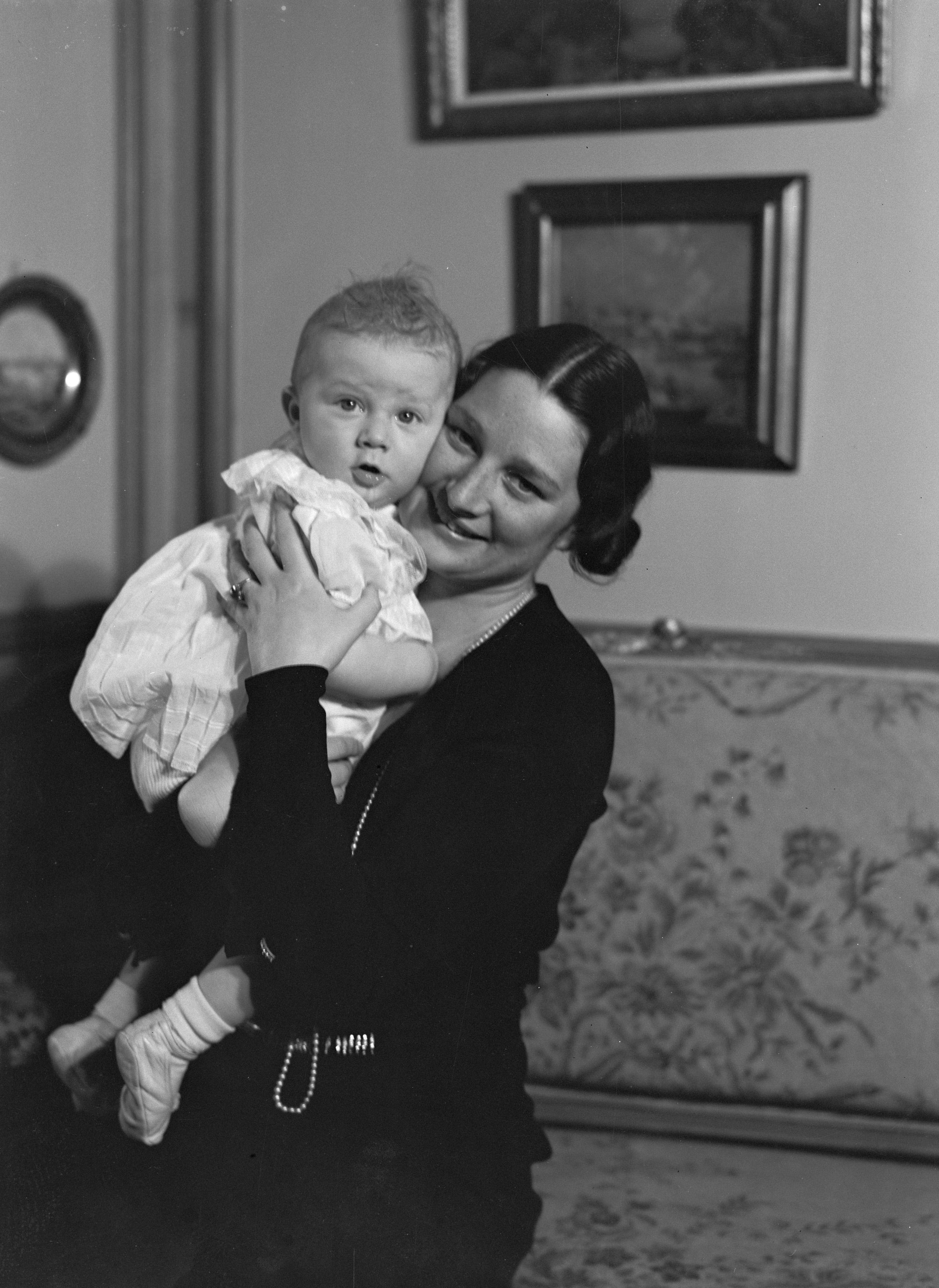

== Hobbies and personality ==
According to Countess Anna Sparre, Astrid was described as shy and insecure, which Sparre attributed to her mother's perceived preference for her elder sister, Märtha. Sparre also described her as firm when defending loved ones.

She collected Swedish folk art and enjoyed sports such as swimming, skiing, climbing, horseback riding and golf.

== Death ==
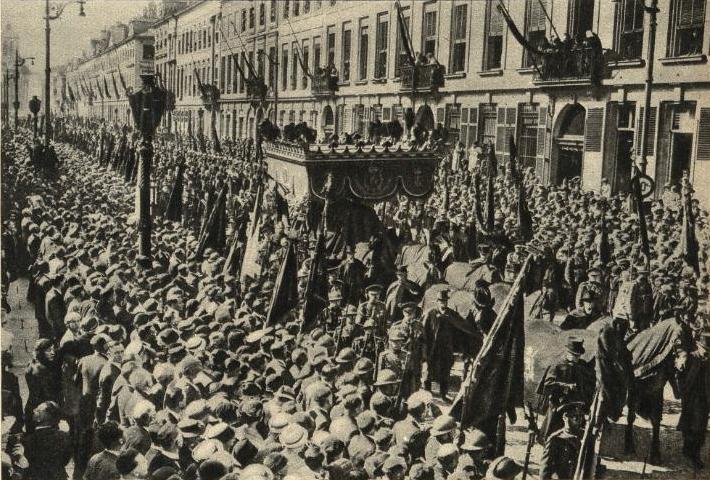
Funeral of Astrid

In August 1935, the King and Queen went incognito to their holiday home, Villa Haslihorn in Horw, on the shores of Lake Lucerne, Switzerland. Joséphine-Charlotte and Baudouin travelled with their parents, while the one-year-old Prince Albert remained in Brussels.

On 29 August 1935, the King and Queen went for a last hike in the mountains before returning home. Their chauffeur was sitting in the back of the Packard One-Twenty convertible; the King was driving and the Queen looking at a map. At approximately 9:30 am the Queen pointed out something to her husband, who looked away from the road. The car left the road, travelled down a steep slope, and collided with a pear tree. Queen Astrid, who was pregnant with her fourth child, had opened her door in an attempt to jump off but was thrown out upon impact, dying instantly after striking her head on the trunk of the tree while the car hit a second tree. She was only 29 years old.

Queen Astrid is interred in the royal vault at the Church of Our Lady of Laeken, Brussels, beside her husband, King Leopold III, and his second wife, Lilian, Princess of Réthy.

== Legacy ==
=== Folklore ===
Alexei Schwarzenbach, a Swiss historian, describes how Queen Astrid entered folklore in Belgium and Switzerland. Months after her death, newlyweds brought flowers to the place where the Queen died. The chapel visitors would also bring wreaths and candles. The visits peaked on feasts of All Saints and All Souls. The Queen was described as an icon of beauty, kindness, romance, marriage, and as a model Catholic. The Mayor of Küssnacht told the Belgian Ambassador to Switzerland: "It is on pilgrimage that these couples arrive here from all over the canton. These young newlyweds, in bridal dress, whom you saw visiting the place where Queen Astrid died, are imploring her protection. Your young Queen has become part of Swiss legend; she is, for our people, who have beatified her in their hearts, the symbol of maternal love and conjugal fidelity."

=== Memorials ===
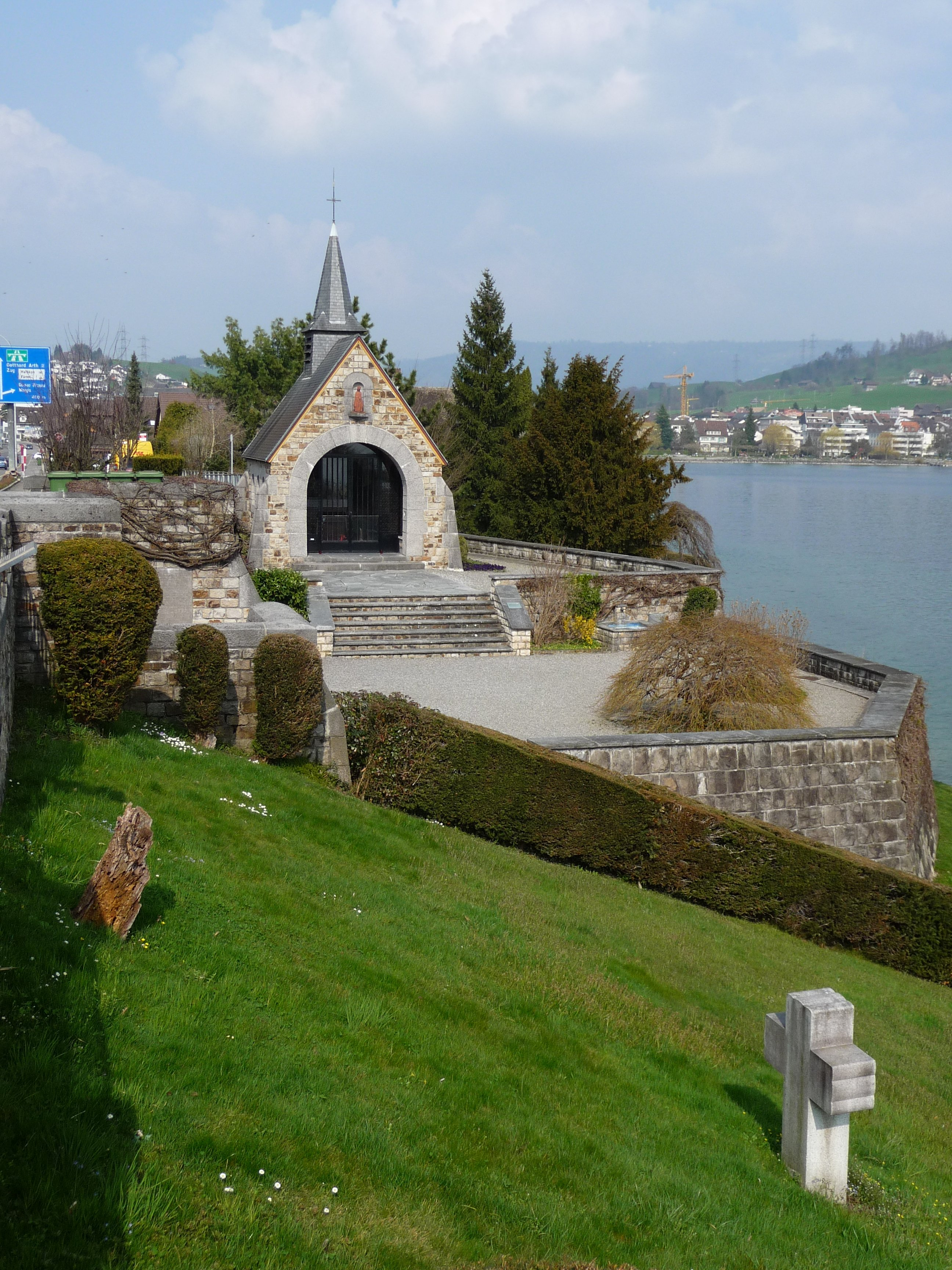
Astrid Chapel and The King's Cross.

In 1935, the Belgian postal authorities issued a postage stamp showing her portrait outlined in black. This is known as the Astrid Mourning issue. Later that same year, it released a series of anti-tuberculosis fund stamps with the same design. Place de la Reine-Astrid in 8th arrondissement of Paris was named in her memory.

A commemorative chapel named Astrid Chapel was built in Switzerland at the site of the crash. The Swiss government gave the land to Belgium a year after Astrid's death and the chapel was built in the style of a Walloon country church. The chapel has become a destination for Swedish and Belgian tourists. The King's Cross, built where the Queen died in her husband's arms, is made from Swedish granite. A museum nearby holds images and memorabilia of the event, including a shard from the windshield and the trunk of the pear tree. The tree itself fell after a storm in 1992. The car was sunk at a deep part of the Vierwaldstättersee at the request of the king.

A memorial was built by the architect Paul Bonduelle in Laeken, Belgium, and inaugurated on 21 July 1938. The building, which is in the late neo-classical style, faces the Church of Our Lady of Laeken and backs onto the Palace of Laeken. The same year, on the initiative of the local Veterans' Front, a bronze bust of the Queen was erected in Wisterzée Park in Court-Saint-Étienne, Belgium, by sculptor Victor Rousseau.

Astrid Avenue in Bogor Botanical Garden in Indonesia was named after her while she was honeymooning there with her spouse in 1928. The avenue is decorated with spectacular displays of canna lilies of various colors. The Swedish layer cake Princess cake was named after Astrid and her two sisters when they were children.

=== Names ===
Four of her descendants were named Astrid to honour her: her granddaughters Princess Marie-Astrid of Luxembourg, Princess Astrid of Belgium, her great-granddaughter Princess Marie-Astrid of Liechtenstein and her great-great-granddaughter Archduchess Anna Astrid of Austria-Este. Her niece Princess Astrid of Norway (later Mrs. Ferner) was also named in her honour. Her husband King Leopold III's first daughter with his second wife Lilian Baels, Princess Marie-Christine Daphné Astrid Élisabeth Léopoldine of Belgium (b. 1951), was named after her.

== Gallery ==
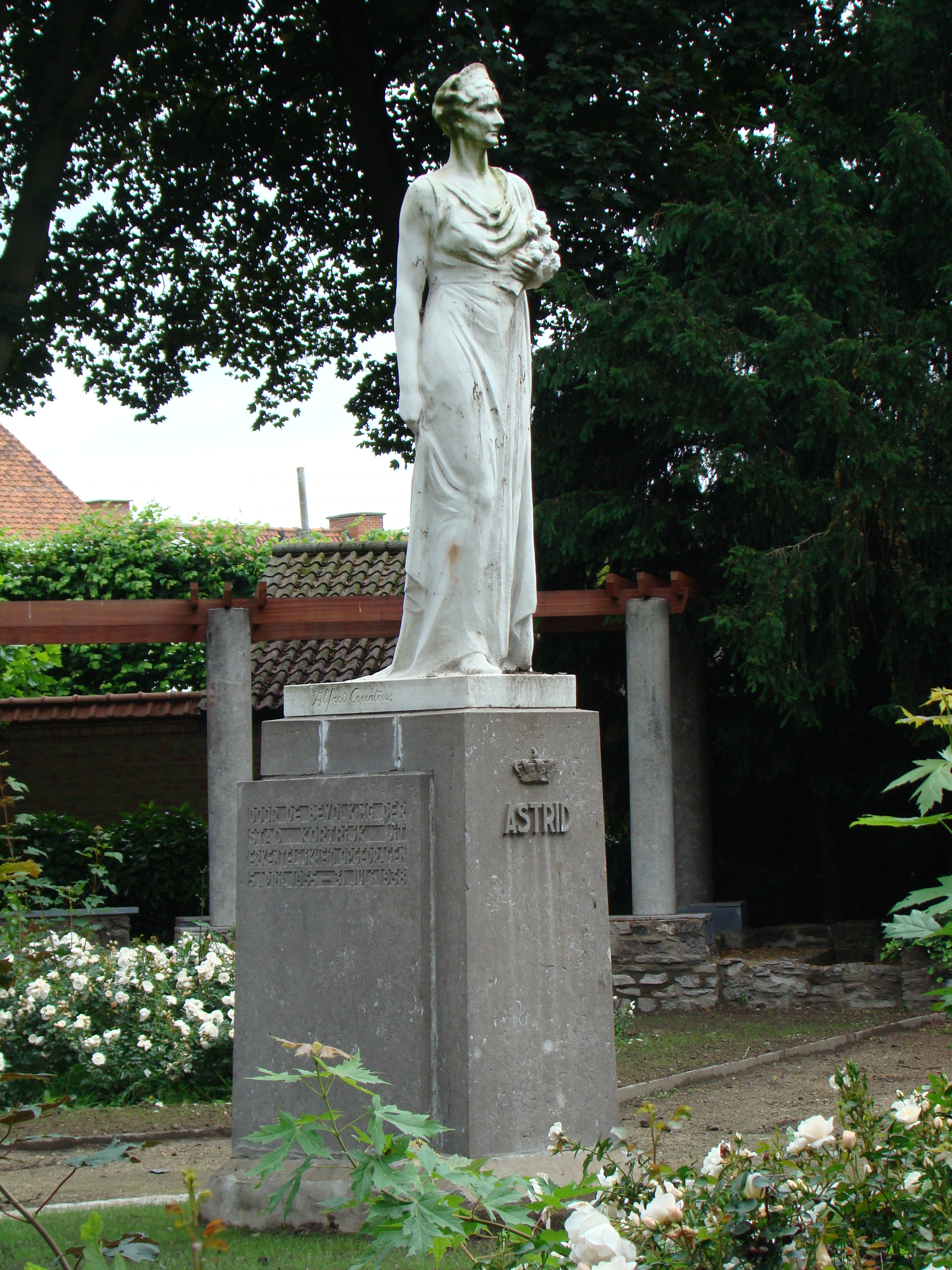
Statue of Astrid in a park at Kortrijk named for her.

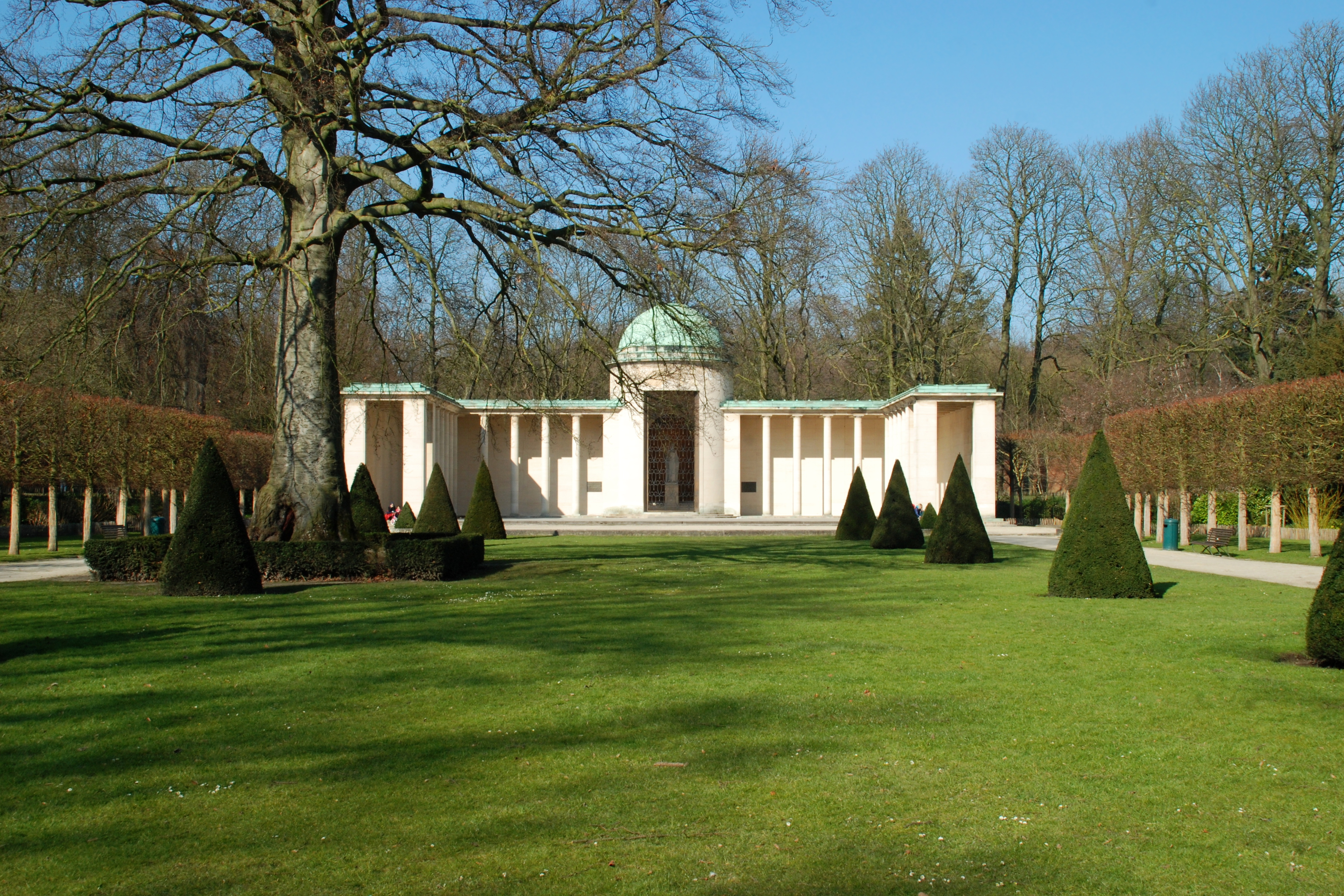
Queen Astrid Memorial in Laeken
(architect Paul Bonduelle, 1938).

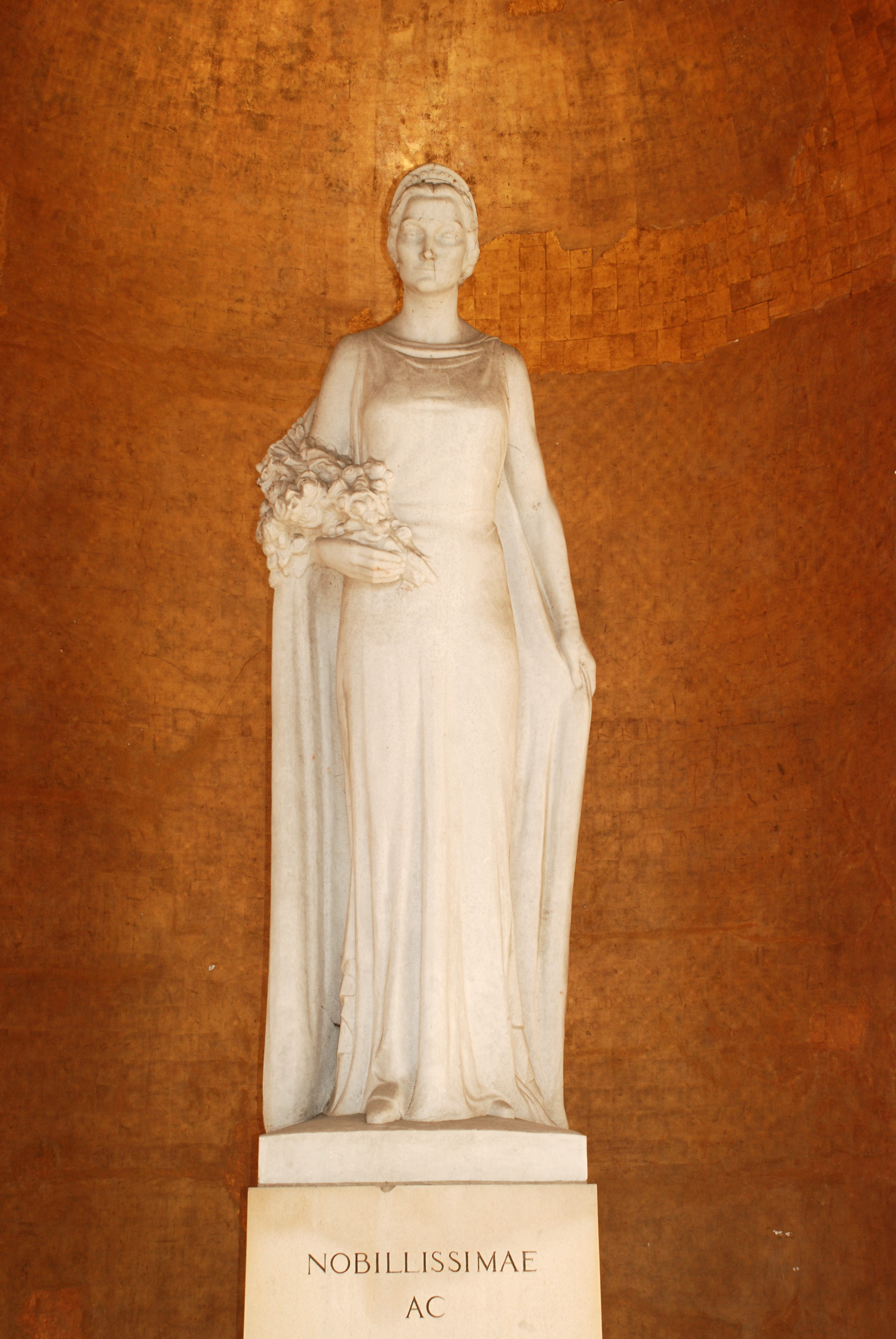
Statue of the Queen in the Queen Astrid Memorial in Laeken.

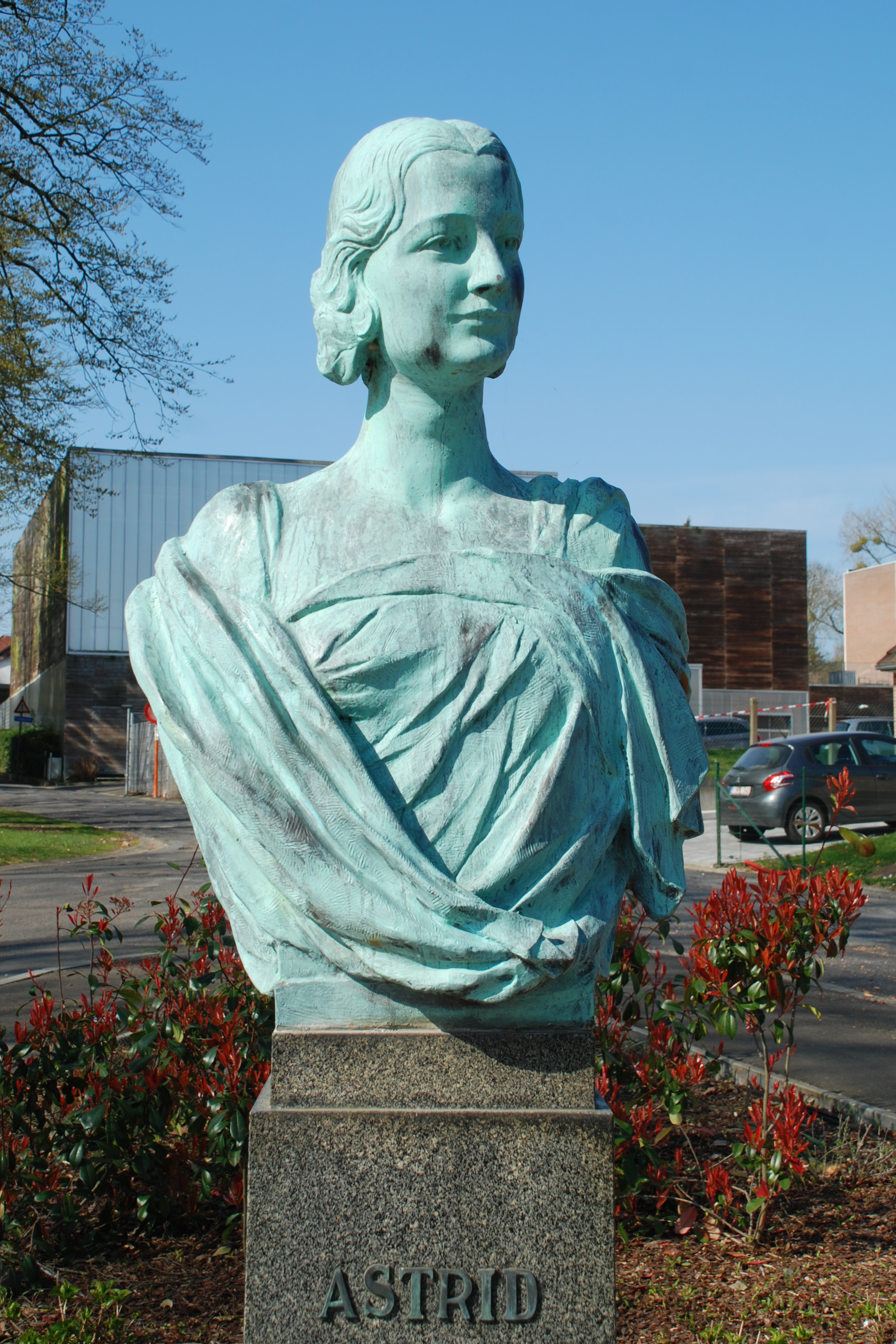
Bronze bust of the Queen in Court-Saint-Étienne
(Victor Rousseau, 1938).

== Arms ==
Alliance Coat of Arms of King Leopold III and Queen Astrid of Belgium	Royal Monogram of Queen Astrid of Belgium

== Ancestry ==
Ancestors of Astrid of Sweden

8. Oscar I of Sweden
4. Oscar II of Sweden
9. Princess Joséphine of Leuchtenberg
2. Prince Carl, Duke of Västergötland
10. William, Duke of Nassau
5. Princess Sophia of Nassau
11. Princess Pauline of Württemberg
1. Princess Astrid of Sweden
12. Christian IX of Denmark
6. Frederik VIII of Denmark
13. Princess Louise of Hesse-Kassel
3. Princess Ingeborg of Denmark
14. Charles XV of Sweden
7. Princess Louise of Sweden
15. Princess Louise of the Netherlands

Astrid of Sweden House of Bernadotte Born: 17 November 1905 Died: 29 August 1935
Belgian royalty
Preceded by Elisabeth of Bavaria	Queen consort of the Belgians; 1934–1935	Vacant Title next held by Fabiola de Mora y Aragón
