= Marie Armand Patrice de Mac Mahon =

19th-20th Century French Nobleman

Marie Armand Patrice de MacMahon 2nd Duke of Magenta
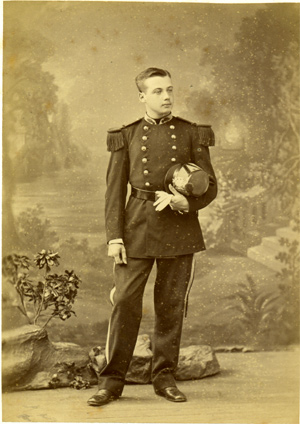

Duke of Magenta
- In office 17 October 1893 – 23 May 1927

Personal details
- Born: 10 June 1855 Outreau, Pas-de-Calais, France
- Died: 23 May 1927 (aged 71) Paris, France
- Spouse: Princess Marguerite d'Orléans (m. 1896)
- Children: Marie Elisabeth; Amélie Françoise Marie; Maurice Jean Marie, 3rd Duke of Magenta
- Parents: Patrice de MacMahon (father); Élisabeth de la Croix de Castries (mother)
- Profession: Military officer

Military service
- Branch/service: French Army
- Rank: Brigadier General
- Unit: 2nd Battalion of Foot Hunters; 129th Infantry Regiment; 35th infantry regiment
- Battles/wars: Colonization of Madagascar; First World War

Marie Armand Patrice de Mac Mahon, known as Patrice de Mac Mahon (10 June 1855 in Outreau – 23 May 1927 in Paris), 2nd Duke of Magenta and 6th Marquis d'Éguilly in 1893, was a French soldier and aristocrat.

== Life ==
The eldest son of Patrice de MacMahon, Duke of Magenta, and Elisabeth de La Croix de Castries. MacMahon joined the Special Military School of Saint-Cyr in 1873 until 1875 (promotion of Archduke Albert). On the death of his father, he inherited the ducal title Duc de Magenta in 1893. The following year, on the death of his cousin, Charles-Marie MacMahon (1856-1894) (m. Marthe de Vogüé), Marie inherited the title Marquis Éguilly in 1894 which was later changed to Marquis de MacMahon.

He participated in the conquest of Madagascar (1883-1896). He was then Battalion Commander from 28 October 1895, he was then appointed head of the 2nd battalion of Foot Hunters in 1896 and remained so until 1904.

After serving in the 129th Infantry Regiment as a lieutenant colonel between 24 December 1912 and 13 October 1914. Also, with the rank of colonel of the 35th Infantry Regiment and the 14th Infantry Division under the command of General Louis Pastor and Etienne de Villaret, as well as Colonel of the 7th army corps commanded by General Louis Bonneau.

He fought in World War I during which he commanded the 43rd Brigade, before being promoted to Brigadier General on 15 February 1915.

From 1924, he lived at 17, Boulevard Raspail. MacMahon died in 1927.

== Marriage and issue ==
Marie Armand Patrice married in a civil ceremony, Princess Marguerite Françoise Marie Louise, daughter of Prince Robert, Duke of Chartres and Princess Françoise of Orléans on 22 April 1896. On the 23rd he had a religious ceremony in the chapel of the Chateau of Chantilly. Princess Marguerite d'Orléans was born on 25 January 1869 in Morgan House, Ham, Richmond, England and died on 31 January 1940 at the Château de la Forêt in Montcresson

From this union are born three children and several descendants:

1. Marie Elisabeth (19 June 1899, Luneville - 28 September 1951, Voreppe, Isère), married Henri Marie Léon de Plan, Count of Sieyès (6 November 1883, Aix-en-Provence - 23 June 1953, Château de la Forêt, Montcresson), on 22 September 1924 in Paris
2. Amélie Françoise Marie (11 September 1900, Luneville - 30 May 1987, Castle of Rambuteau), recipient of the Resistance Medal, Chevalier of the Legion of Honour, married Almeric Philibert Marie Emmanuel Lombard de Buffières, Count of Rambuteau (29 August 1890, Geneva - 14 December 1944, Concentration camp of Buchenwald), on 5 February 1921 in Paris
3. Maurice Jean Marie, 3rd Duke of Magenta (13 November 1903, Luneville - 27 October 1954, Evreux), married Countess Marguerite Riquet de Caraman-Chimay (29 December 1913, Paris - 1 September 1990, Nice ) on 25 August 1937 at the Château de Sully. Had issue, including:
  1. Philippe Maurice Marie, 4th Duke of Magenta (15 May 1938, Paris - 24 January 2002, Paris ), he married firstly, Claire-Marguerite Schindler (born: 1 August 1953, Geneva), on 15 February 1978 in Mollis, Switzerland (divorced in 1990). He married secondly Amelia Margaret Mary Drummond (born: 2 July 1963, Glencarse), on 4 May 1990 in London, she was the daughter of Humphrey ap Evans (later, Drummond of Megginch) and Cherry Drummond, 16th Baroness Strange. He had two children from each marriage:
    1. Adelaide Philippine Jeanne Marie (born: 3 October 1978, Autun) married Romain Armand Philippe Marie Joseph Pezet de Corval (born: 1979), on 3 April 2004 in Lusigny in a civil ceremony and a religious ceremony on the following 15 May in the Sainte-Marie-Madeleine basilica of Saint-Maximin-la-Sainte-Baume
    2. Eléonore Philippine Jeanne Marie (born: 18 November 1980, Boulogne-Billancourt)
    3. Pélagie Jeanne Marie Marguerite Charlotte Nathalie (born on 24 June 1990 at the Château de Sully) married Prince Amaury of Bourbon-Parma (grandson of Prince Michel of Bourbon-Parma), on 4 June 2023 in Sully in a civil ceremony and a religious ceremony on 8 July in Castle of Sully-sur-Loire
    4. Maurice Marie Patrick Bacchus Humphrey, 5th Duke of Magenta (born on 30 March 1992 at Beaune)
  2. Nathalie Jeanne Marie (11 April 1939, Paris - 25 February 2006, Évreux)
  3. Anne Monique Marie (9 August 1941, Château de Sully - 11 April 2003, Neuilly), married Gérard Louis Jacques Arnould Thénard, Baron Thénard (born on 3 March 1940, Neuilly), on 5 October 1963 (divorced on 22 May 1985)
  4. Patrice Michel Marie (born on 11 September 1943, Lausanne), married Beatrix Bénigne Marie Anne de Blanquet du Chayla (born on 27 March 1945, Tain-l'Hermitage), on 11 June 1966 in Beaumont-le-Roger
    1. Diane Marguerite Marie (born on 18 September 1968, Paris), a French television personality, married firstly Frédéric Beigbeder (born on 21 September 1965, Neuilly), on 17 May 1991 in Paradou, they were divorced on 6 March 1996. Married secondly Guillaume Durand (born on 23 September 1952, Boulogne-Billancourt) on 8 April 2009 in Paris
    2. Elisabeth Jeanne Marie (born on 7 October 1970, Paris), married Philippe Edouard Bruno Lamblin (born on 12 December 1968, Saint-Mandé), on 24 March 2000 in Paradou
    3. Sophie Jeanne Marie (born on 26 May 1973, Boulogne-Billancourt), married Esteban Juan Blanco y Theux (born on 1 June 1966, Valencia Spain), on 11 July 1997 in Paradou
    4. Amélie Marie Victoire (born on 12 March 1976, Boulogne-Billancourt), married Hubert Clicquot de Mentque (born on 6 October 1974, Pau), on 6 October 2007 in Paradou

== Awards ==
- Commander of the Legion of Honour
- Croix de guerre 1914–1918, with 2 Bars
- Commemorative Medal of Madagascar (1883-1896).

== References and Bibliography ==
=== Bibliography ===
- Patrick van Kerrebrouck et Christophe Brun, La maison de Bourbon : 1256-2004, vol. 2, 2004, 1010 p. (ISBN 978-2-9501509-5-0)
- Gabriel de Broglie, Mac Mahon, Perrin, 2000, 459 p. (ISBN 978-2-262-01143-7)
- Ronald Zins, Les maréchaux de Napoléon III : dictionnaire, Horvath, 1996, 251 p. (ISBN 978-2-7171-0892-7)

=== References ===
French nobility
Preceded by Marie Edme Patrice Maurice de MacMahon	Duc de Magenta; 1893–1927	Succeeded by Maurice Jean Marie de MacMahon
