= Princess Marguerite of Orléans (1869–1940) =

Princess Marguerite d'Orléans
- Duchess of Magenta
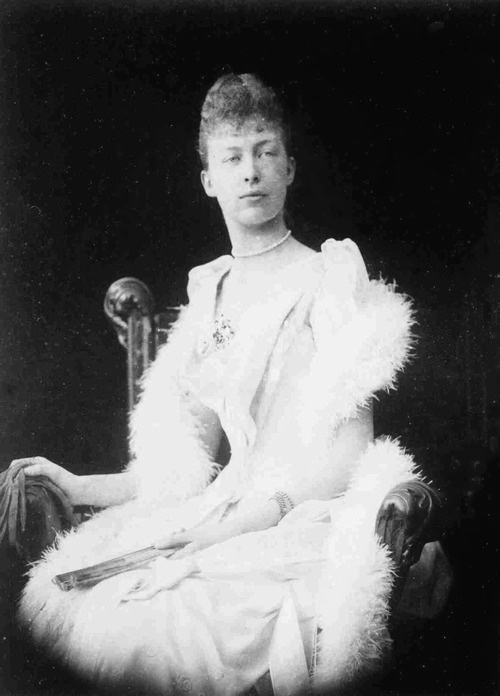
- Born: 25 January 1869; Morgan House, Ham, Richmond, England, United Kingdom
- Died: 31 January 1940 (aged 71); Château de la Forêt, Montcresson, Loiret, France
- Spouse: Marie Armand Patrice de Mac Mahon (m. 1896; died 1927)
- Issue: Marie Élisabeth; Amélie Françoise Marie; Maurice Jean Marie, 3rd Duke of Magenta
- House: House of Orléans
- Father: Prince Robert, Duke of Chartres
- Mother: Princess Françoise of Orléans

Princess Marguerite Marie Françoise Louise d'Orléans, Duchess of Magenta (25 January 1869 – 31 January 1940) was a member of the House of Orléans, a branch of the House of Bourbon. She was the daughter of Prince Robert, Duke of Chartres, and Princess Françoise of Orléans, both grandchildren of Louis Philippe I, King of the French. In 1896, she married Marie Armand Patrice de Mac Mahon, eldest son of Marshal Patrice de MacMahon, who had served as president of France from 1873 to 1879. Marguerite became Duchess of Magenta through her marriage, and the couple had three children.

== Early life ==
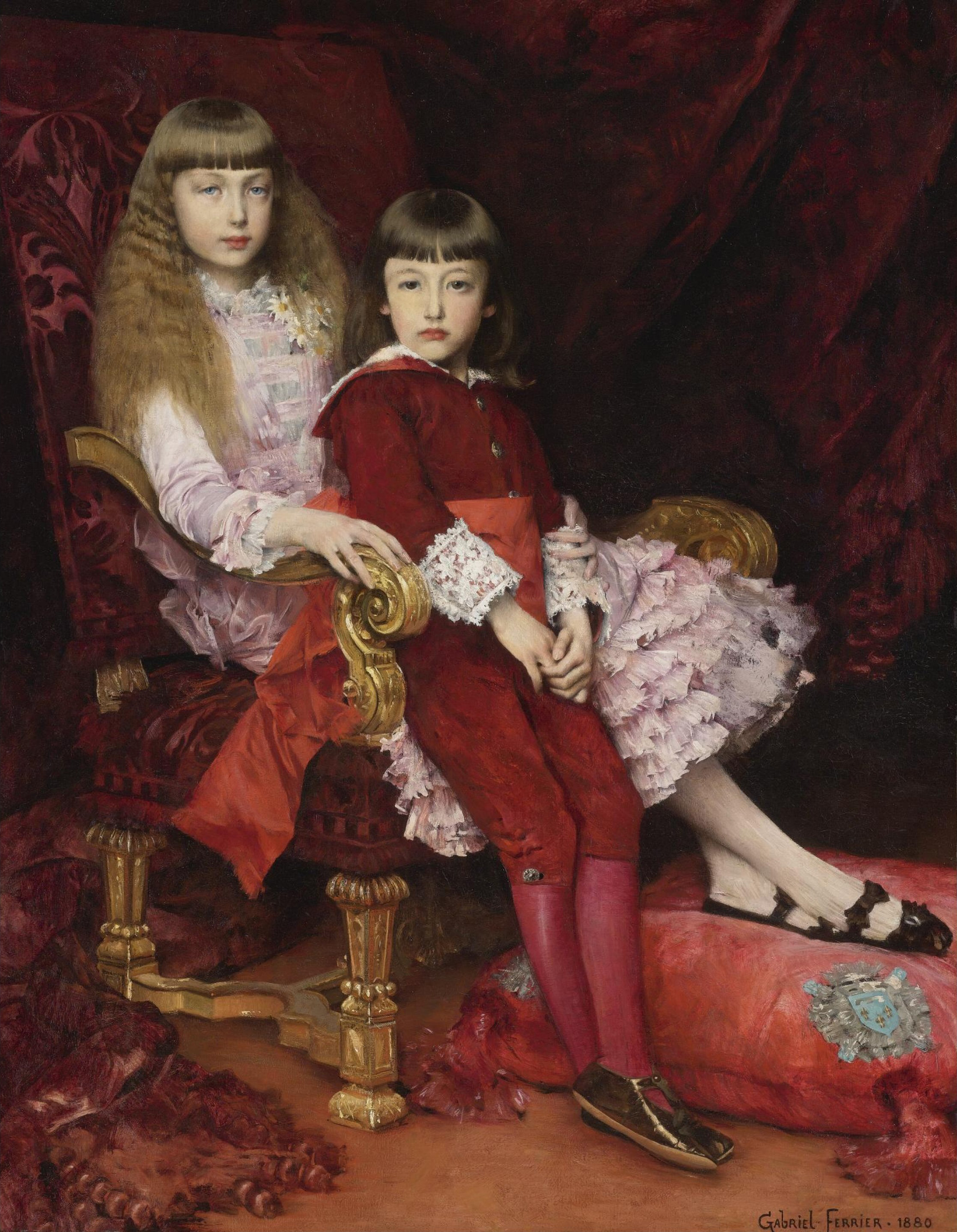
Marguerite with her brother Prince Jean, Duke of Guise

Marguerite was born on 25 January 1869 at Morgan House, Ham, near Richmond, England. Her father, Robert d'Orléans, Duke of Chartres, was a son of Ferdinand Philippe, Duke of Orléans, the eldest son of Louis Philippe I. Her mother, Françoise d'Orléans, was a daughter of François d'Orléans, Prince of Joinville, another son of the former king. Marguerite was therefore descended from Louis Philippe through both parents.

Her birth in England reflected the exile of the House of Orléans following the French Revolution of 1848, which had overthrown her grandfather's monarchy. Members of the family established residences in Britain while excluded from France. Marguerite's early childhood was spent in this setting; the family was able to return to France following the repeal of the legislation restricting the return of the former ruling dynasty in 1871.

Marguerite grew up with several siblings, including her elder sister Marie, who married Prince Valdemar of Denmark, and her younger brother Prince Jean, Duke of Guise, who later became an Orléanist claimant to the French throne. The family's correspondence provides evidence of the close relationships between its members. A catalogue of letters written by Robert, Duke of Chartres, to Marie records his discussion of Marguerite's proposed marriage in the 1890s, including his description of the match as a French and military alliance and his consideration of the financial arrangements for her dowry.

== Marriage and issue ==
Marguerite married Marie Armand Patrice de Mac Mahon, the second Duke of Magenta, in a civil ceremony at the town hall of the 8th arrondissement of Paris on 22 April 1896. A religious ceremony took place the following day in the chapel of the Château de Chantilly. Her husband was the eldest son of Patrice de MacMahon, Marshal of France and president of the French Republic from 1873 to 1879, and Élisabeth de La Croix de Castries.

The marriage linked the House of Orléans, formerly the ruling dynasty of France, with the Mac Mahon family, whose head had played a prominent role in the country's military and political life. Marguerite's husband pursued a military career and held the title of Duke of Magenta, which had been created for his father. The title was hereditary within the family; Marguerite used the feminine form, Duchess of Magenta, after her marriage.

Marguerite and her husband had three children:

- Marie Elisabeth (19 June 1899, Luneville - 28 September 1951, Voreppe, Isère), married Henri Marie Léon de Plan, Count of Sieyès (6 November 1883, Aix-en-Provence - 23 June 1953, Château de la Forêt, Montcresson), on 22 September 1924 in Paris
- Amélie Françoise Marie (11 September 1900, Luneville - 30 May 1987, Castle of Rambuteau), recipient of the Resistance Medal, Chevalier of the Legion of Honour, married Almeric Philibert Marie Emmanuel Lombard de Buffières, Count of Rambuteau (29 August 1890, Geneva - 14 December 1944, Concentration camp of Buchenwald), on 5 February 1921 in Paris
- Maurice Jean Marie, 3rd Duke of Magenta (13 November 1903, Luneville - 27 October 1954, Evreux), married Countess Marguerite Riquet de Caraman-Chimay (29 December 1913, Paris - 1 September 1990, Nice ) on 25 August 1937 at the Château de Sully. Had issue, including:
  - Philippe Maurice Marie, 4th Duke of Magenta (Paris 15 May 1938 – 24 January 2002), married firstly, Claire-Marguerite Schindler (born: 1 August 1953, Geneva), on 15 February 1978 in Mollis, Switzerland (divorced in 1990). He married secondly Amelia Margaret Mary Drummond (born: 2 July 1963, Glencarse), on 4 May 1990 in London, she was the daughter of Humphrey ap Evans (later, Drummond of Megginch) and Cherry Drummond, 16th Baroness Strange. He had two children from each marriage:
    - Adélaide Philippine Jeanne Marie (born 3 October 1978, Autun) married Romain Armand Philippe Marie Joseph Pezet de Corval (born 1979), on 3 April 2004 in Lusigny in a civil ceremony and a religious ceremony on the following 15 May in the Sainte-Marie-Madeleine basilica of Saint-Maximin-la-Sainte-Baume
    - Eléonore Philippine Jeanne Marie (born 18 November 1980, Boulogne-Billancourt)
    - Pélagie Jeanne Marie Marguerite Charlotte Nathalie (born on 24 June 1990 at the Château de Sully) married Prince Amaury of Bourbon-Parma (born 1991, grandson of Prince Michel of Bourbon-Parma), civilly on 3 June 2023 at the town hall of Sully and religiously on the following 8 July at the Cathedral of Saint Lazarus of Autun
    - Maurice Marie Patrick Bacchus Humphrey, 5th Duke of Magenta (born on 30 March 1992 at Beaune)
  - Nathalie Jeanne Marie (11 April 1939, Paris - 25 February 2006, Évreux)
  - Anne Monique Marie (9 August 1941, Château de Sully - 11 April 2003, Neuilly), married Gérard Louis Jacques Arnould Thénard, Baron Thénard (born on 3 March 1940, Neuilly), on 5 October 1963 (divorced on 22 May 1985)
  - Patrice Michel Marie (born on 11 September 1943, Lausanne), married Beatrix Bénigne Marie Anne de Blanquet du Chayla (born on 27 March 1945, Tain-l'Hermitage), on 11 June 1966 in Beaumont-le-Roger
    - Diane Marguerite Marie (born on 18 September 1968, Paris), a French television personality, married firstly Frédéric Beigbeder (born on 21 September 1965, Neuilly), on 17 May 1991 in Paradou, they were divorced on 6 March 1996. Married secondly Guillaume Durand (born on 23 September 1952, Boulogne-Billancourt) on 8 April 2009 in Paris
    - Elisabeth Jeanne Marie (born on 7 October 1970, Paris), married Philippe Edouard Bruno Lamblin (born on 12 December 1968, Saint-Mandé), on 24 March 2000 in Paradou
    - Sophie Jeanne Marie (born on 26 May 1973, Boulogne-Billancourt), married Esteban Juan Blanco y Theux (born on 1 June 1966, Valencia Spain), on 11 July 1997 in Paradou
    - Amélie Marie Victoire (born on 12 March 1976, Boulogne-Billancourt), married Hubert Clicquot de Mentque (born on 6 October 1974, Pau), on 6 October 2007 in Paradou

== Later life and death ==
Marguerite's husband died in Paris in 1927, after more than three decades of marriage. Their son Maurice succeeded him as Duke of Magenta. Marguerite survived her husband by nearly thirteen years.

Marguerite died on 31 January 1940 at the Château de la Forêt in Montcresson, in the French department of Loiret, six days after her 71st birthday. Her death occurred during the opening months of the Second World War.

== Ancestry ==
Ancestors of Princess Marguerite of Orléans (1869–1940)

8. Louis Philippe I of France (=12)
4. Prince Ferdinand Philippe, Duke of Orléans
9. Princess Marie Amélie of Naples and Sicily (=13)
2. Prince Robert, Duke of Chartres
10. Frederick Louis, Hereditary Grand Duke of Mecklenburg-Schwerin
5. Duchess Helene of Mecklenburg-Schwerin
11. Princess Caroline Louise of Saxe-Weimar-Eisenach
1. Princess Marguerite d'Orléans
12. Louis Philippe I of France (=8)
6. François, Prince of Joinville
13. Maria Amalia of Naples and Sicily (=9)
3. Princess Françoise d'Orléans
14. Pedro I of Brazil and IV of Portugal
7. Princess Francisca of Brazil
15. Maria Leopoldina of Austria
