= Chateau de Sully =

Chateau de Sully may refer to:

- Air France Flight 007, also known as Chateau de Sully, 1962 crash of an Air France Boeing 707
- Château de Sully, Renaissance château of southern Burgundy, France
