= Marguerite d'Orléans =

Marguerite d'Orléans may refer to:

- Margaret, Countess of Vertus (1406–1466)
- Marguerite Louise d'Orléans (1645–1721)
- Élisabeth Marguerite d'Orléans (1646–1696)
- Princess Marguerite of Orléans (1846–1893)
- Princess Marguerite of Orléans (1869–1940)
