= Élisabeth de Mac Mahon =

French spouse of Patrice de Mac Mahon

Élisabeth de Mac Mahon Duchess of Magenta
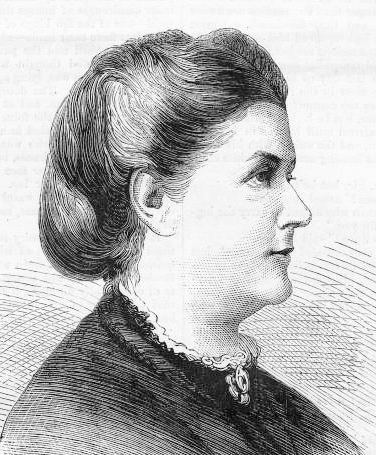

Spouse of the President of France
- In role 24 May 1873 – 30 January 1879
- President: Patrice de MacMahon
- Preceded by: Élise Thiers
- Succeeded by: Coralie Grévy

Personal details
- Born: Elisabeth Charlotte Sophie de La Croix de Castries; 13 February 1834 Paris, France
- Died: 20 February 1900 (aged 66) Paris, France
- Spouse: Patrice de MacMahon (m. 1854; died 1893)
- Children: 4 incl. Patrice de MacMahon, 2nd Duke of Magenta

Élisabeth Charlotte Sophie de Mac Mahon, Marquise de Mac Mahon, Duchesse de Magenta (née de La Croix de Castries (13 February 1834 – 20 February 1900) was the wife of the President of France Patrice de MacMahon.

== Biography ==
De la Croix de Castries was born in Paris in 1834, the daughter of Comte Armand de la Croix de Castries (1807–1862), of the House of Castries, a noble family from Languedoc, by his wife Maria Augusta d′Harcourt, of the House of Harcourt.

She married, on 14 March 1854, Patrice de Mac-Mahon, who was to become Marechal de France and Duke of Magenta in 1859. Her spouse became President of France in 1873. Élisabeth de Mac Mahon established and participated in representation, decorated the Presidential Palace, hosted balls where she mixed the old and new aristocracy, dressed in the latest fashion and became the president in the French Red Cross, where she started a charity project in making baby clothes for the poor.

Élisabeth de Mac Mahon is known to have exerted influence upon the affairs of state during the presidency of Mac-Mahon. Her opinion about various political ministers and officials were respected, and she supported the claims of the count of Chambord on the throne of France. She played a part in the 16 May 1877 crisis, which ultimately led to her husband′s resignation in January 1879.

In 1898, she had a paralytic attack, from which she only partially recovered, and she died in Paris on 20 February 1900.

The Magentas left four children:

- Marie Armand Patrice de Mac Mahon (1855–1927), who succeeded as Duke of Magenta, and who married Princess Marguerite d'Orléans (1869-1940), daughter of Prince Robert, Duke of Chartres
- Marie-Eugène de MacMahon, comte de MacMahon (1857–1907)
- Marie-Emmanuel de MacMahon, comte de MacMahon (1859–1930)
- Marie de MacMahon (1863–1964), who married Comte d′Halwin de Piennes

Unofficial roles
Preceded by Élise Thiers	Spouse of the President of France; 1873–1879	Succeeded by Coralie Grévy
