= MacMahon family =

Family

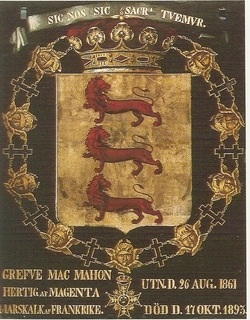
Coat of arms of MacMahon family, Dukes of Magenta

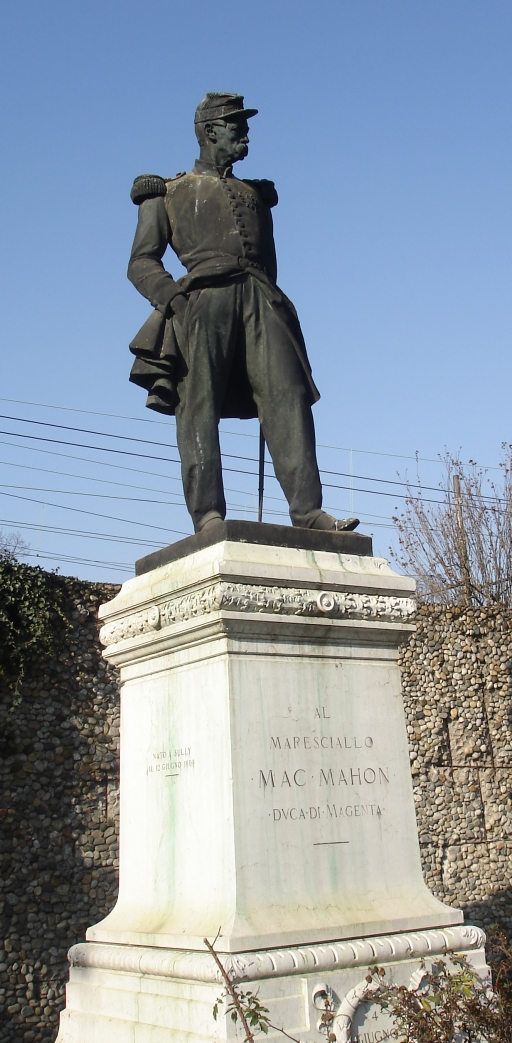
Statue of Patrice de MacMahon in Magenta, Italy

The MacMahon family originated in Ireland and later established itself in France, where it gained prominence. In the context of French nobility, the head of the family holds the titles of Duc de Magenta and Marquis de MacMahon.

== History ==
John MacMahon (1715–1775), an Irish doctor born in Limerick became naturalised in France in 1749 and married Charlotte Le Belin, Dame d'Éguilly, on 13 April 1750. John claimed descendance to the lords of Munster, via the great-grandson of Brian Boru. That same year, King Louis XV of France created him Count d'Equilly. In 1763, John MacMahon further received the title of Marquis d'Éguilly. His son, the 2nd Marquis, served in the American War of Independence, including on the frigate Aigle which the British captured on 15 September 1782. The senior line of the MacMahon family continued until the death of the 5th Marquis in 1894.

Patrice de MacMahon, a grandson of the first Marquis from the MacMahon family's younger line, served with distinction as a general in the Crimean War of 1853–56 and later in the Austro-Sardinian War of 1859, winning the Battle of Magenta on 4 June 1859. The following day Emperor Napoleon III created him Duc de Magenta. Later he became President of the French Republic, serving from 1873 to 1879.

At the 1st Duc de Magenta's death in 1893, his titles passed to his eldest son Armand de MacMahon (1855–1927), who in 1894 also succeeded as 6th Marquis d'Eguilly, thus uniting the titles held by the senior and the younger lines of the MacMahon family. The title of Marquis d'Eguilly was later changed to Marquis de MacMahon.

The family seat of the de MacMahon family was the Château de la Forêt in Montcresson in the Loiret department of north-central France (where the 1st Duke died) but, after 1894, they inherited the current family seat from the senior line, the Château de Sully in Sully in the Saone-et-Loire department.

== Marquises d'Éguilly (1763) ==
The holders of the title of Marquis d'Éguilly have included:

- Jean Baptiste MacMahon, 1st Marquis d'Éguilly (1715–1775)
- Charles Laure MacMahon, 2nd Marquis d'Éguilly (1752–1830)
- Charles Marie MacMahon, 3rd Marquis d'Éguilly (1793–1845)
- Charles Henri MacMahon, 4th Marquis d'Éguilly (1828–1863)
- Charles Marie MacMahon, 5th Marquis d'Éguilly (1856–1894) m. Marthe de Vogüé
- Marie Armand Patrice MacMahon, 2nd Duc de Magenta, 6th Marquis d'Éguilly (1855–1927); he had previously succeeded as 2nd Duc de Magenta (see below)

== Dukes of Magenta (1859) ==
The holders of the title of Duc de Magenta have included:

- Marie Edme Patrice Maurice de MacMahon, 1st Duc de Magenta (1808–1893)
- Marie Armand Patrice MacMahon, 2nd Duc de Magenta, 6th Marquis d'Éguilly/de MacMahon (1855–1927), husband of Princess Marguerite d'Orléans
- Maurice de MacMahon, 3rd Duc de Magenta, 7th Marquis de MacMahon (1903–1954)
- Philippe de MacMahon, 4th Duc de Magenta, 8th Marquis de MacMahon (1938–2002), son-in-law of Cherry Drummond, 16th Baroness Strange
- Maurice de MacMahon, 5th Duc de Magenta, 9th Marquis de MacMahon (born 1992)

== See also ==
- Duke of Lodi (Conte di Magenta), an Italian noble title
