= Élise Thiers =

Wife of Adolphe Tiers (1818–1880)

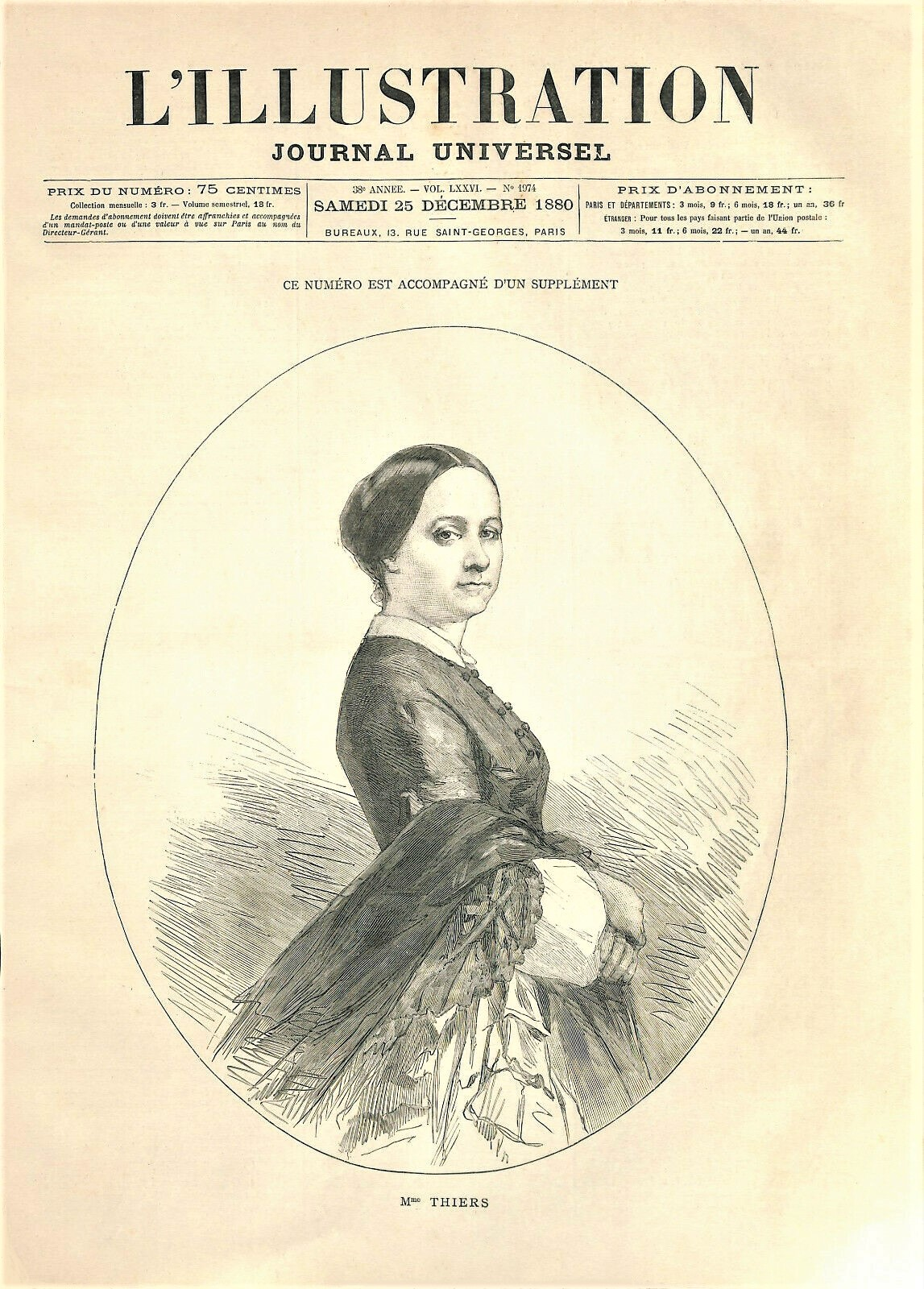
Mme Thiers, etching published by L'Illustration in 1880

Élise Thiers (1818–December 11, 1880) was the wife of the President of France Adolphe Thiers.

She was the daughter of a banker named Dosne; her mother was from Auvergne. She married Thiers in 1833, when she was 15 years old. Prior and after their marriage, Thiers had a relationship with her mother Eurydice and her sister Felicité. This became a topic of gossip and slander during the presidency of her spouse, when her sister Felice resided with them and performed the representational duties by her side. Élise Thiers was regarded to be stingy, educated, and pretty. She accompanied her spouse on diplomatic dinners and demonstrated her economic sensibility by going herself to the market in Versailles.

In 1877 her husband died; she demanded to be in charge of his funeral, against considerable opposition. She died in 1880, in her sixties.

Unofficial roles
First	Spouse of the President of France; 1871–1873	Succeeded by Élisabeth de Mac Mahon
