= Sully, Saône-et-Loire =

Sully
- Commune
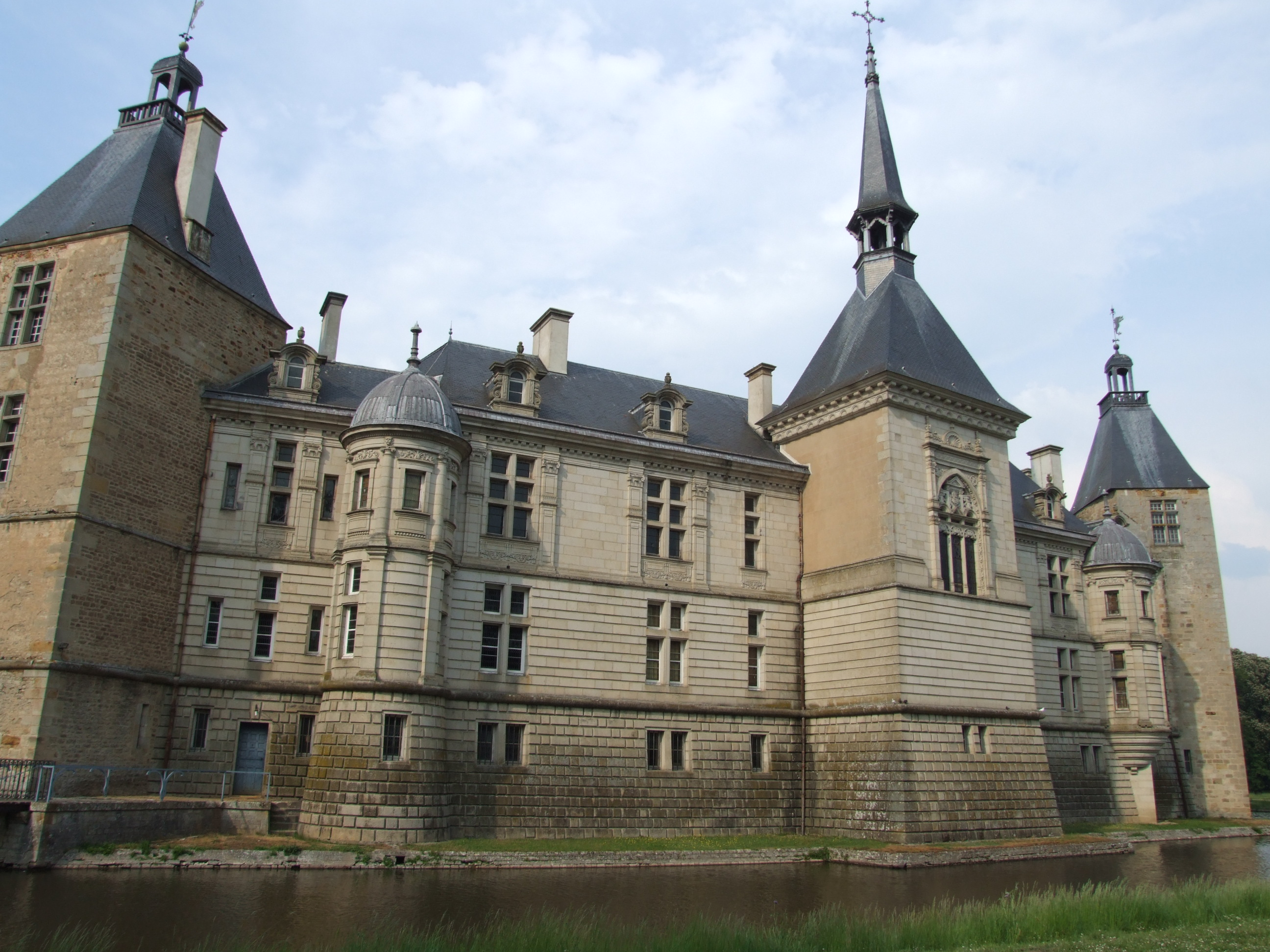
- Chateau
- Location of Sully
- Location within France Location within Bourgogne-Franche-Comté
- Coordinates: 47°00′28″N 4°28′20″E
- Country: France
- Region: Bourgogne-Franche-Comté
- Department: Saône-et-Loire
- Arrondissement: Autun
- Canton: Autun-1
- Intercommunality: Grand Autunois Morvan

Government
  - Mayor (2020–2026): Emmanuel Roucher
- Area^{1}: 31.84 km^{2} (12.29 sq mi)
- Elevation: 323 m (1,060 ft)
- Highest elevation: 530 m (1,740 ft)
- Lowest elevation: 308 m (1,010 ft)
- Population (2023): 486
  - Density: 15.3/km^{2} (39.5/sq mi)
- Time zone: UTC+01:00 (CET)
  - Summer (DST): UTC+02:00 (CEST)
- INSEE/Postal code: 71530 /71360
- ^{1} French Land Register data, which excludes lakes, ponds, glaciers > 1 km^{2} (0.386 sq mi or 247 acres) and river estuaries.

Sully is a commune in the Saône-et-Loire department in the region of Bourgogne-Franche-Comté in eastern France.

== People ==
It was the birthplace of the President Patrice de MacMahon.

== See also ==
- Château de Sully
- Communes of the Saône-et-Loire department
