= Patrice de MacMahon =

President of France from 1873 to 1879

Marshal Patrice de MacMahon Duke of Magenta
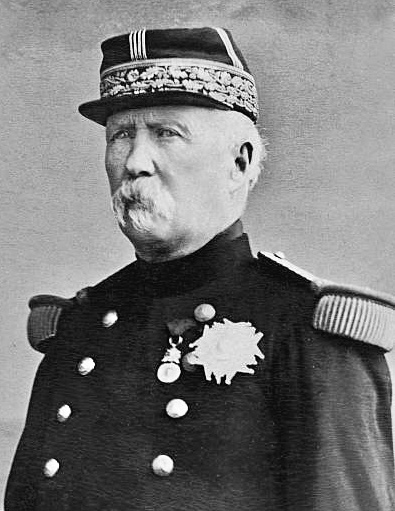
- Patrice de MacMahon, c. 1890

President of France
- In office 24 May 1873 – 30 January 1879
- Prime Minister: See list: Albert de Broglie; Ernest Courtot de Cissey; Louis Buffet; Jules Armand Dufaure; Jules Simon; Gaëtan de Rochebouët
- Preceded by: Adolphe Thiers
- Succeeded by: Jules Grévy

Governor-General of Algeria
- In office 1 September 1864 – 27 July 1870
- Monarch: Napoleon III
- Cabinet Chief: Émile Ollivier; Charles Cousin-Montauban
- Minister of the Navy and Colonies: Prosper de Chasseloup-Laubat; Charles Rigault de Genouilly
- Preceded by: Édmond de Martimprey
- Succeeded by: Louis Durrieu

Senator
- In office 24 June 1864 – 4 September 1870
- Nominated by: Napoleon III

Personal details
- Born: 13 June 1808 Sully, Saône-et-Loire, France
- Died: 17 October 1893 (aged 85) Montcresson, Loiret, France
- Party: Miscellaneous right (Legitimist)
- Spouse: Élisabeth de La Croix de Castries (m. 1854)
- Children: Marie Armand Patrice de Mac Mahon (1855–1927); Eugene de Mac Mahon (1857–1907); Emmanuel de Mac Mahon (1859–1930); Marie de Mac Mahon (1863–1954); Countess de Pinnes
- Relatives: MacMahon family
- Education: Special Military School of Saint-Cyr

Military service
- Allegiance: France
- Branch/service: French Army
- Years of service: 1827–1873
- Rank: Marshal of France
- Commands: I Army Corps; Army of the Rhin; Army of Châlons
- Battles/wars: See list: Conquest of Algeria; Siege of Constantine (1837); Crimean War (1853–1856); Battle of Malakoff (1855); Franco-Austrian War (1859); Battle of Magenta (1859); Battle of Solferino (1859); Franco-Prussian War (1870–1871); Battle of Wörth (1870); Battle of Sedan (1870); Paris Commune (1871)

Marie Edme Patrice Maurice de MacMahon, marquis de MacMahon, duc de Magenta (French: [patʁis də makma.ɔ̃]; 13 June 1808 – 17 October 1893), was a French general and politician who served as President of France from 1873 to 1879. He was elevated to the dignity of Marshal of France by Napoleon III.

MacMahon led the main French army in the Franco-Prussian War in 1870. He was trapped and wounded at the Battle of Sedan in September 1870, in part because of his confused and indecisive strategic planning. The army, including MacMahon and Emperor Napoleon III, surrendered to the Germans. Thus the Emperor was deposed and the French Third Republic was proclaimed. After convalescing, MacMahon was appointed head of the Versailles army, which suppressed the Paris Commune revolt in May 1871 and set the stage for his political career.

According to David Bell, after Adolphe Thiers' resignation in May 1873, the royalist majority in the National Assembly drafted MacMahon as the new leader, with the hope that he would hold the fort until the Bourbon pretender was ready to restore the throne. However, the Count of Chambord's extreme Legitimist stance made restoration politically impossible. MacMahon refused to support efforts to force the Assembly's hand. In the absence of his full support there was no way to achieve monarchy by extra-parliamentary means. The right had no choice but to keep MacMahon in office to gain time and act as a barrier to the left by repressing radical agitation and pursuing policies to restore "moral order" to the country. In November 1873, he was voted a term of office of seven years.

In 1874, due to demands for Bonapartism, MacMahon called for constitutional reform. To ensure calm this led to a system of a President and Senate elected indirectly. In 1876, MacMahon had to accept the governments of moderate Republicans Jules Armand Dufaure and Jules Simon. However, in 1877, MacMahon dismissed Simon and recalled the Duke de Broglie. The new government was dissolved on a no confidence vote. Conservatives hoped to exploit their influential press, heavy patronage, and martial law to coerce the voters. They failed in the general election of October 1877, as the Republicans won the majority despite the challenges on the right. In January 1879, the Republicans forced MacMahon's resignation.

MacMahon was a devout conservative Catholic, and a traditionalist who despised anarchism, communism, socialism and liberalism and strongly distrusted the mostly secular Republicans. He kept to his duty as the neutral guardian of the Constitution and rejected suggestions of a monarchist coup d'état, but refused to meet with Gambetta, the leader of the Republicans. He moved for a parliamentary system in which the assembly selected the ruling government of the Third Republic, but he also insisted on an upper chamber. He later dissolved the Chamber of Deputies, resulting in public outrage and a Republican electoral victory. Soon after MacMahon resigned and retired to private life.

== Family and early life ==
The MacMahon family is of Irish origin. They were Lords of Corcu Baiscind in Ireland and descended from Mahon, the son of Muirchertach Ua Briain, High King of Ireland. After losing much of their land in the Cromwellian confiscations of 1652, a branch moved to Limerick for a time. They supported the deposed King James II in the Glorious Revolution of 1688 and settled in France during the subsequent reign of King William III. They applied for French citizenship in 1749; after the definitive installation of the family in France, their nobility was recognised by the patent letter of King Louis XV.

A military family (14 members of the house of de Mac Mahon were in the Army), they settled in Autun, Burgundy, at the Chateau de Sully, in the département of Saône-et-Loire, where Patrice de MacMahon was born on 13 June 1808, sixteenth and the second-youngest son of Baron Maurice-François de Mac Mahon (1754–1831), Baron of Sully, Count de MacMahon and de Charnay, and Pélagie de Riquet de Caraman (1769–1819), a descendant of Pierre-Paul Riquet.

His grandfather Jean-Baptiste de MacMahon, was named Marquis de MacMahon and 1st Marquis d'Éguilly (from his wife Charlotte Le Belin, Dame d'Éguilly) by King Louis XV, and the family in France had decidedly royalist politics.

== Military career ==
=== Early career and service in Algeria ===
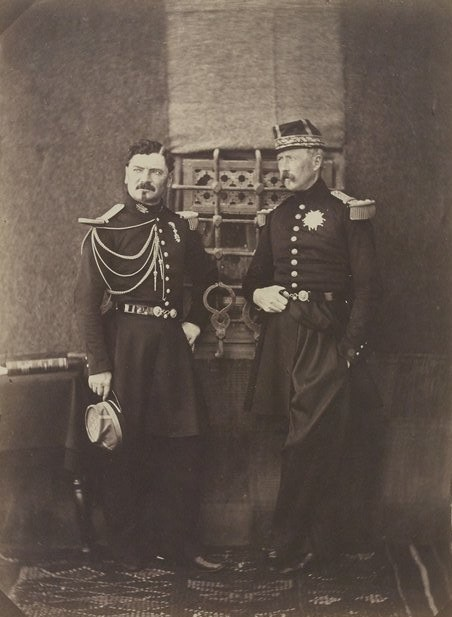
General MacMahon (right) with General Jean-Louis Borel (left), c. 1856

In 1820, MacMahon entered the Petit Séminaire des Marbres at Autun; then completed his education at Lycée Louis-le-Grand at Paris. He then entered the Special Military School at Saint-Cyr on 23 October 1825. He then joined the application school at the General Staff Headquarters on 1 October 1827, for a period of two years.

Following his graduation from Saint-Cyr, MacMahon entered the French Army in 1827. He was assigned to the 4th Hussars Regiment in 1830. MacMahon subsequently participated in the French conquest of Algeria as a sous-lieutenant in the 20th Line Infantry Regiment. He was commended for his capacity and bravery during the seizure of Algiers. On 24 November 1830, MacMahon further distinguished himself while serving with his regiment, during the Medea expedition, during the battle of Mouzaïa mountain. He was awarded the Knight Order of the Legion d'honneur.

Recalled to France, MacMahon participated in 1832 to the Ten Days' Campaign where he was noticed again during the Siege of Antwerp.

He was promoted captain in 1833, and returned to Algeria, this time, in 1836 where he was placed under the orders of General Bertrand Clausel, and then General Charles-Marie Denys de Damrémont. He led several audacious cavalry raids across tribal occupied plains and distinguished himself during the Siege of Constantine, in 1837, where he was slightly wounded. In 1840, he left Algeria and upon his return to France, he learned that he had been promoted to chef d'escadron (cavalry squadron chief).

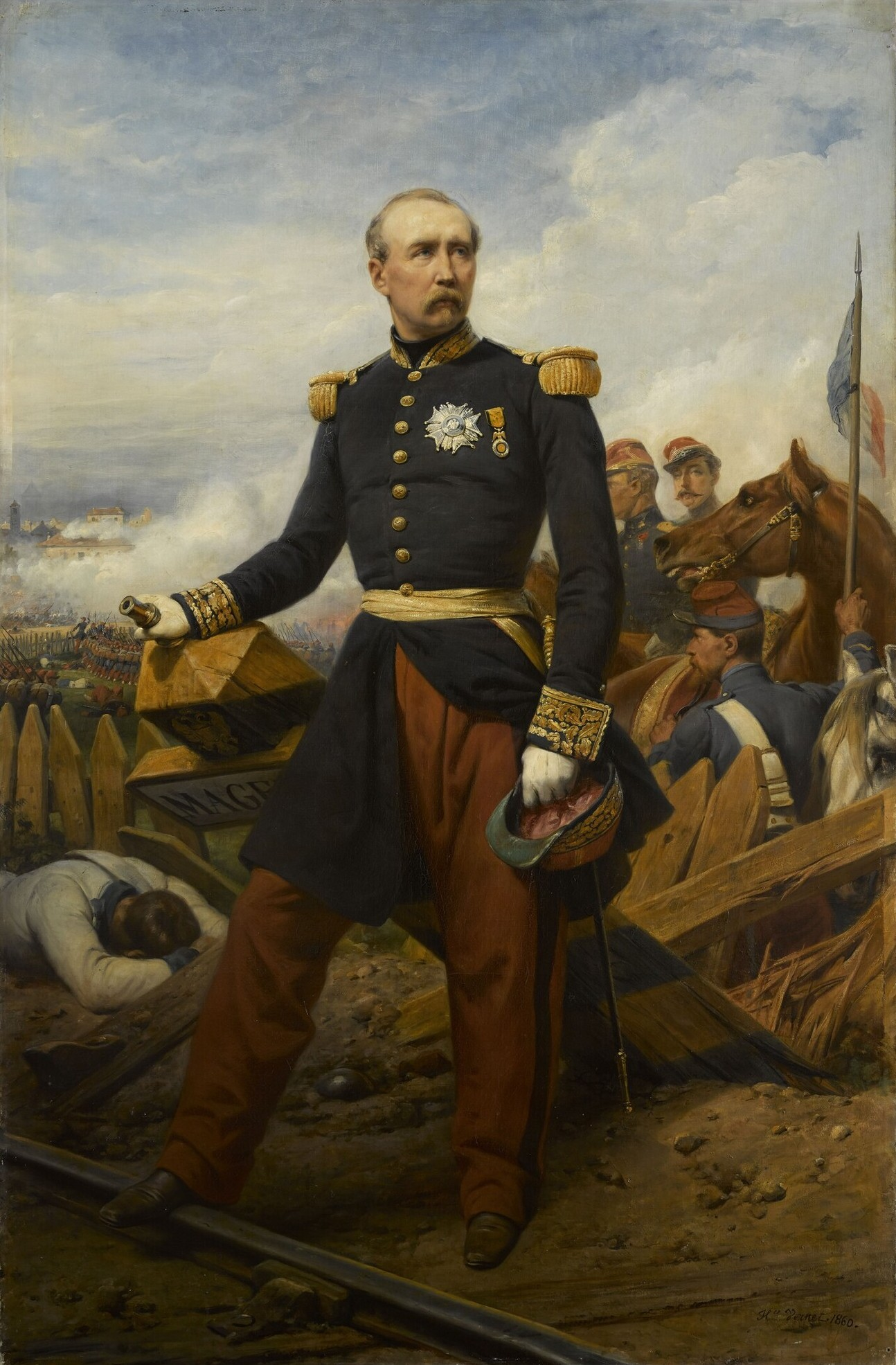
Portrait of Marshal MacMahon by Horace Vernet, 1860

Returned again to Algeria at the head of the 10th Chasseur Battalion à Pied, distinguished himself, in April, at the Battle of Bab el-Thaza and against the troops of Emir Abdelkader, on 25 May.

On 31 December 1842, he was promoted lieutenant-colonel in the 2nd Regiment of the French Foreign Legion 2^{ème} R.E.L.E. In 1843, he assumed the functions of regimental commander, when the incumbent was taken ill, and retained the command until 1845.

MacMahon distinguished himself again during the battle of Chaab el-Gitta and the battle of Aïn Kebira on 14 October and 17 October 1844.

Promoted colonel in December 1845, he was assigned command of the 41st Line Infantry Regiment, garrisoned at Marnia.

Since 1848, MacMahon was appointed head of the subdivision of Tlemcen, where he was promoted général de brigade on 12 June that same year.

In 1849, he became a Commander of the Order of the Legion d'honneur, and served under General Aimable Pélissier, chief of the general staff of the Oran Province.

In 1852 MacMahon organized in Algeria the plebiscite of legitimation by universal suffrage destined to approve the French coup d'état of 1851. In March the same year he was appointed commander of the Constantine Division and promoted Général de division in July.

=== Crimean War, Sevastopol ===
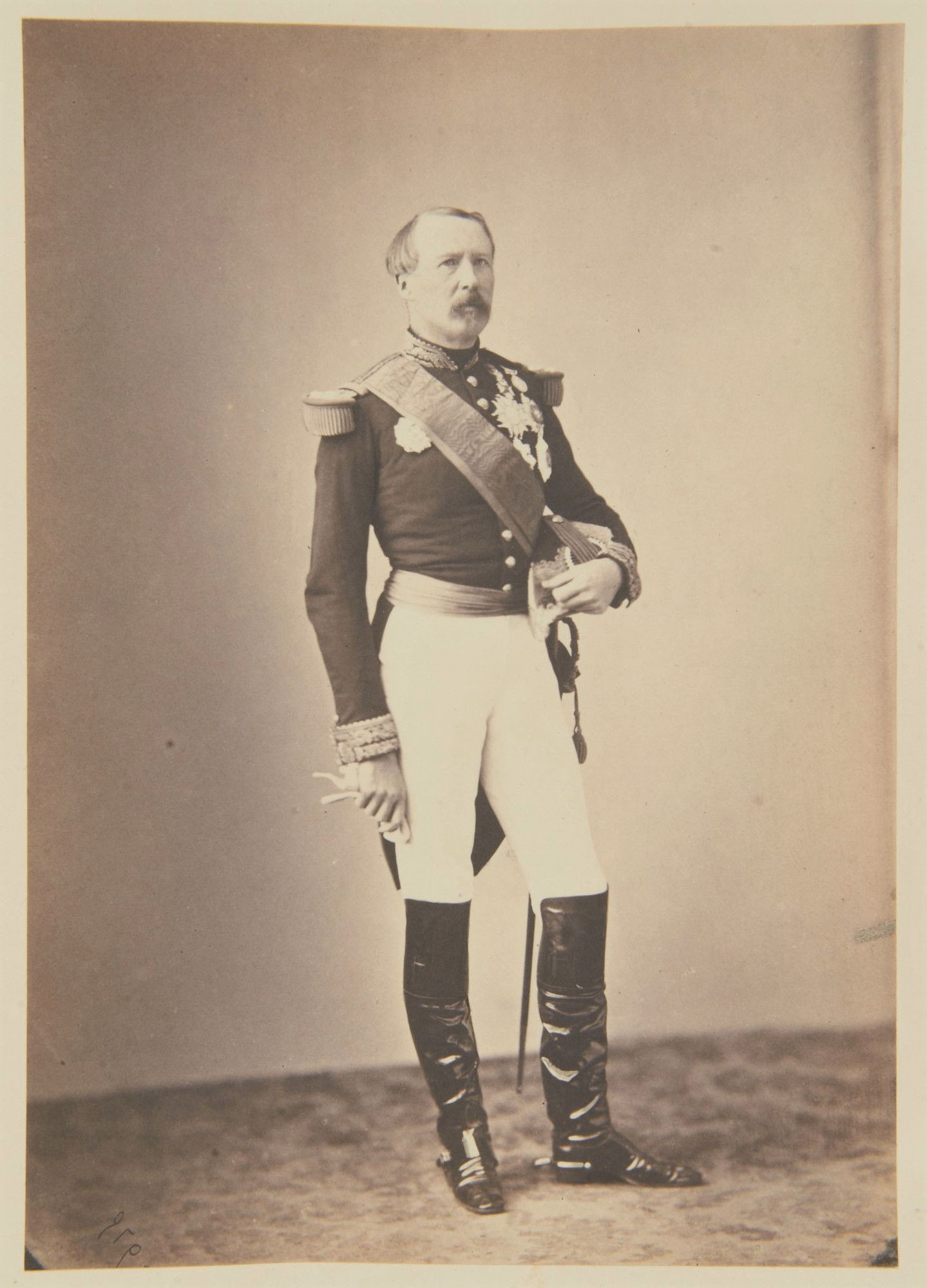
Général MacMahon, c. 1865-70

During the Crimean War, he was given command of the 1st Infantry Division of the 2nd Orient Army Corps and, in September 1855, he won a victory at the Battle of Malakoff during the Siege of Sevastopol. During the battle he is reputed to have said: "Here I am; here will I stay!" (French: J'y suis, j'y reste!)

=== Senator and further Algerian service ===
After his return to France, he received a number of honours and was appointed Senator. Desiring a more active life, he refused a senior position in the French metropolitan army, and returned to Algeria. In Algeria, he served in a campaign against the Kabyle people. On his return to France, he voted as senator against a new law on general security, proposed after the failed assassination attempt of Felice Orsini against Emperor Napoleon III; the law (which passed) allowed easier government action against "enemies of the Empire" and those suspected of political crimes, and made anyone who did not pledge allegiance to Napoleon III ineligible for the legislature.

=== Magenta: Marshal of France ===
MacMahon distinguished himself during the Italian Campaign of 1859. He advanced his troops without having received orders at a critical moment during the Battle of Magenta, which assured French victory.

For his military services, he was appointed a Marshal of France by Emperor Napoleon III, and awarded the title of Duke of Magenta.

=== Governor General of Algeria ===
In 1861 MacMahon represented France at the coronation of William I as King of Prussia. In 1864, he was named as Governor General of Algeria.

MacMahon did not distinguish himself in this appointment. While he initiated several reforms, numerous complaints were made against him. During the first half of 1870, he submitted his resignation to Napoleon III. When the Olivier cabinet was formed, the Emperor abandoned his Algerian projects and MacMahon was recalled.

=== Franco-Prussian War and the Paris Commune ===
MacMahon led the main French army in the Franco-Prussian War where he suffered several defeats in Alsace. He was seriously wounded during the Battle of Sedan. In 1871 the French army surrendered, and the Germans had clearly won the war. Overall his strategic planning was confused and marked by indecision. He, along with the rest of the army including the Emperor, was made prisoner during the capitulation of Sedan on 1 September.

In 1871, he became the head of the army of the French Third Republic, under President Adolphe Thiers, and in May led the Semaine Sanglante, the bloody week-long military campaign which defeated the Paris Commune and placed the city under the authority of the Third Republic. He was not blamed for the repression, but instead became the hero of the hour for the right.

== President of the Republic ==
In May 1873, MacMahon was elected President of the French Third Republic, by the royalist and conservative majority in the National Assembly. Only one vote was cast against him. Renowned for his popularity, MacMahon was elected following the unsuccessful election of Adolphe Thiers on 24 May 1873. He replaced Prime Minister Jules Armand Dufaure with Duke Albert de Broglie, a monarchist. With de Broglie as Prime Minister, he adopted a series of measures to install a new conservative "moral order".

MacMahon favoured a restoration of the monarchy but when this project failed, accepted a seven-year mandate which the Assembly gave him on 9 November 1873. MacMahon deemed himself responsible to the country rather than to parliament, which brought him into conflict with the Chamber of Deputies.

In his still unpublished memoirs, MacMahon described his political convictions: "By family tradition, and by the sentiments towards the royal house which were instilled in me by my early education, I could not be anything but a Legitimist." Nevertheless, in November 1873, he refused to meet with the Bourbon claimant to the throne, Henri, Count of Chambord, as he thought this incompatible with his duties as President of the Republic. On 4 February 1874, MacMahon declared that he would respect the established legal order. Preferring to remain "au-dessus des partis" (above parties), he observed rather than took part in the procedures which in January and February 1875 led to the French Constitutional Laws of 1875, which established the French Third Republic as the government of France.

During the night of 23–24 June 1875 the Garonne region suffered heavy flooding. While visiting the inundated cities and villages he declared "que d'eau… que d'eau !… " (nothing but water...only water!...). The prefect of the department responded to him: "Et encore, Monsieur le Président, vous n'en voyez que le dessus!" (Then again, Mr. President, you are only seeing what's above the surface!").

In September 1875, he stayed at Vernon for several days, in order to prepare the grand maneuvers of the third army. Following the 1876 French legislative election, which resulted in a republican majority, he agreed with great reluctance to the formation of governments under prime ministers Jules Dufaure and Jules Simon, which were dominated by Republicans.

In order to contain France, German Chancellor Otto von Bismarck sought to promote republicanism in France by strategically and ideologically isolating MacMahon's clerical-monarchist supporters. Bismarck's containment policy almost got out of hand in 1875 during the "War in Sight" crisis. There was a war scare in Germany and France when the German press reported that influential Germans, alarmed by France's rapid recovery from defeat in 1871 and its rearmaments program, were talking of launching a preemptive attack on France. Britain and Russia made it clear that they would not tolerate such aggression. Bismarck did not seek war either, but the unexpected crisis forced him to take into consideration the alarm that his aggressive policies, plus Germany's fast-growing power, were causing among its neighbors.

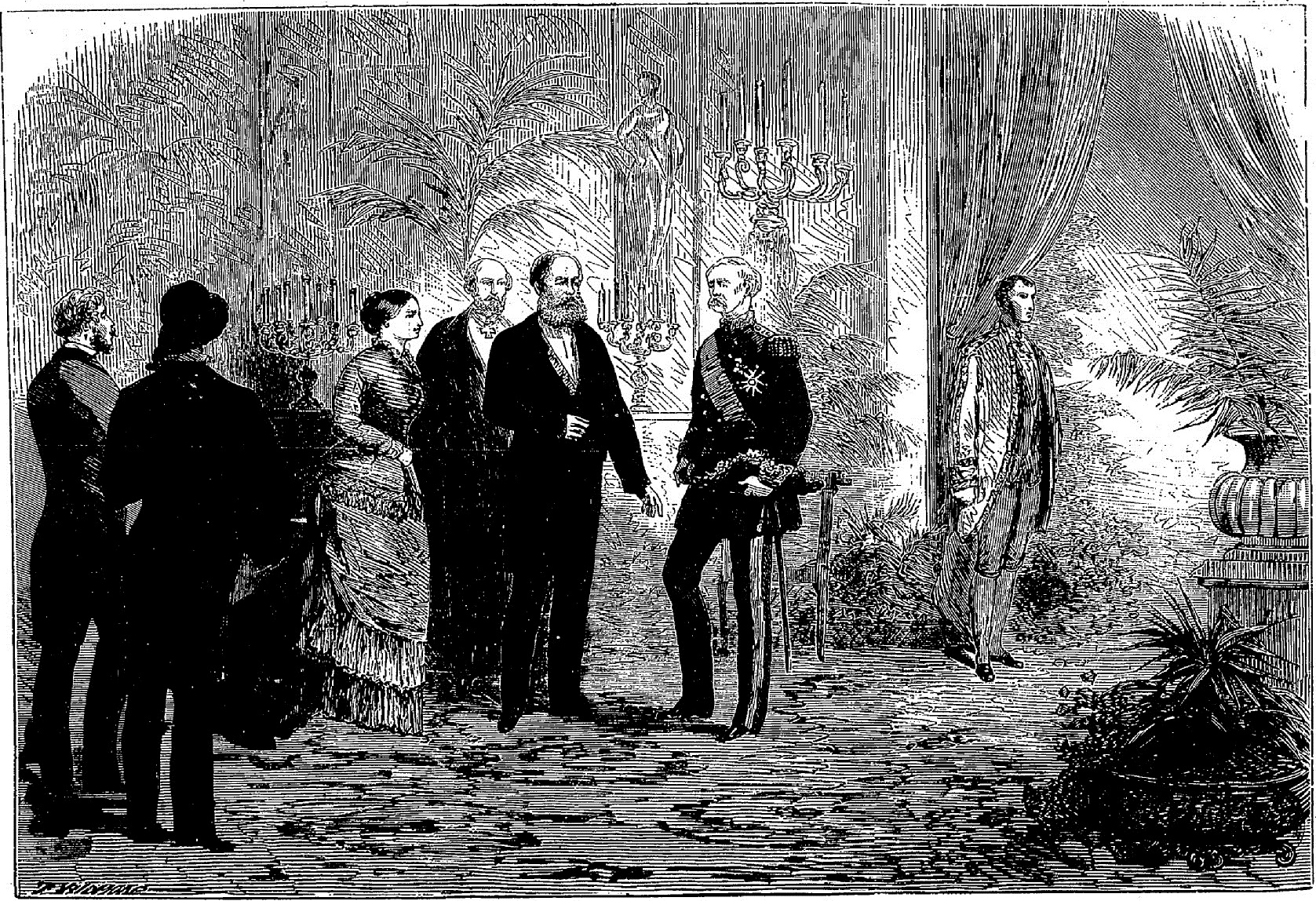
Visit of the President-Marshal to the Emperor and Empress of Brazil, in Paris (L'Univers illustré, nº 1.153, 28 April 1877)

The 16 May 1877 crisis heightened MacMahon's conflict with the Chamber of Deputies. After the bishops of Poitiers, Nimes and Nevers had assured Pius IX of the French government's support in the Roman question, the Chamber passed a resolution that asked the government to "suppress the ultramontanism manifestations". Twelve days later, he dismissed Prime Minister Jules Simon and again appointed Albert de Broglie. Hoping for a conservative victory, MacMahon then convinced the Senate to dissolve the Chamber of Deputies, and campaigned across the country, while protesting that he had no intention of overthrowing the Republic. On 15 August 1877, Léon Gambetta declared: "Le Président n'a que ce choix: il lui faut se soumettre ou se démettre." ("The President has only but one choice: he must submit or resign.")

The elections of 14 October gave the Republicans a majority of 120 seats, and prime minister Broglie accordingly resigned on 19 November. MacMahon attempted first to form a government under General Gaëtan de Rochebouët, but the Chamber refused to cooperate with him. Rochebouët resigned the next day, and the President recalled Dufaure to form a Republican government. On 5 January 1879, elections to the Senate also resulted in a Republican majority, depriving MacMahon of his last parliamentary support. Faced with a decree which revolved around confiscating and diminishing a number of military authorities and commands to certain generals, MacMahon preferred to resign on 30 January 1879. He was succeeded by the Republican Jules Grévy.

His presidency may be summarised thus: on the one hand, he allowed the Republic to establish itself; on the other hand, so far as his lawful prerogatives permitted, he restrained the political advance of parties hostile to the Catholic Church, convinced that the triumph of Radicalism would be to the detriment of the nation. MacMahon's government was mildly repressive toward the left. Newspapers were prosecuted, senior officials were removed if they were suspected of support for republicanism. Critical pamphlets were suppressed while the government circulated its own propaganda. The proprietors of meeting places were advised not to allow meetings of critics of the government. On the other hand, he gave no support to a coup d'état by monarchists. MacMahon truly believed that the National Assembly should rule France and not the president.

== Last years ==
From 1887 to 1893, he directed the Société de secours aux blessés militaires (S.S.B.M.—Rescue Society of Wounded Military), which in 1940 became the French Red Cross.

Patrice de MacMahon died on 17 October 1893, at the Château de la Forêt at Montcresson, after having written his memoirs. He was buried on 22 October at the Hôtel des Invalides after a state funeral and a religious mass at La Madeleine. The five cordons (ornamental cords) of the funeral chariot were held by General Victor Février, Grand Chancellor of the Legion d'Honneur; Admiral Henri Rieunier, Minister of the Navy; General Julien Loizillon, Minister of War; Senator Charles Merlin; and M. Malvy from the Chamber of Deputies.

== Gallery ==
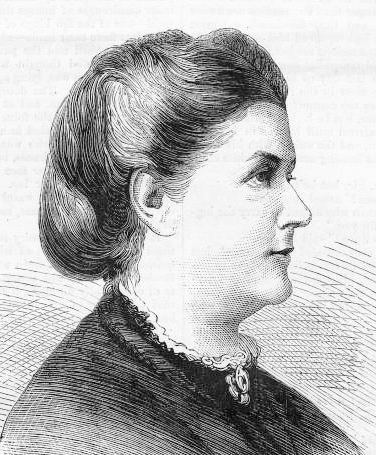
Élisabeth de MacMahon (1834–1900), wife of Patrice

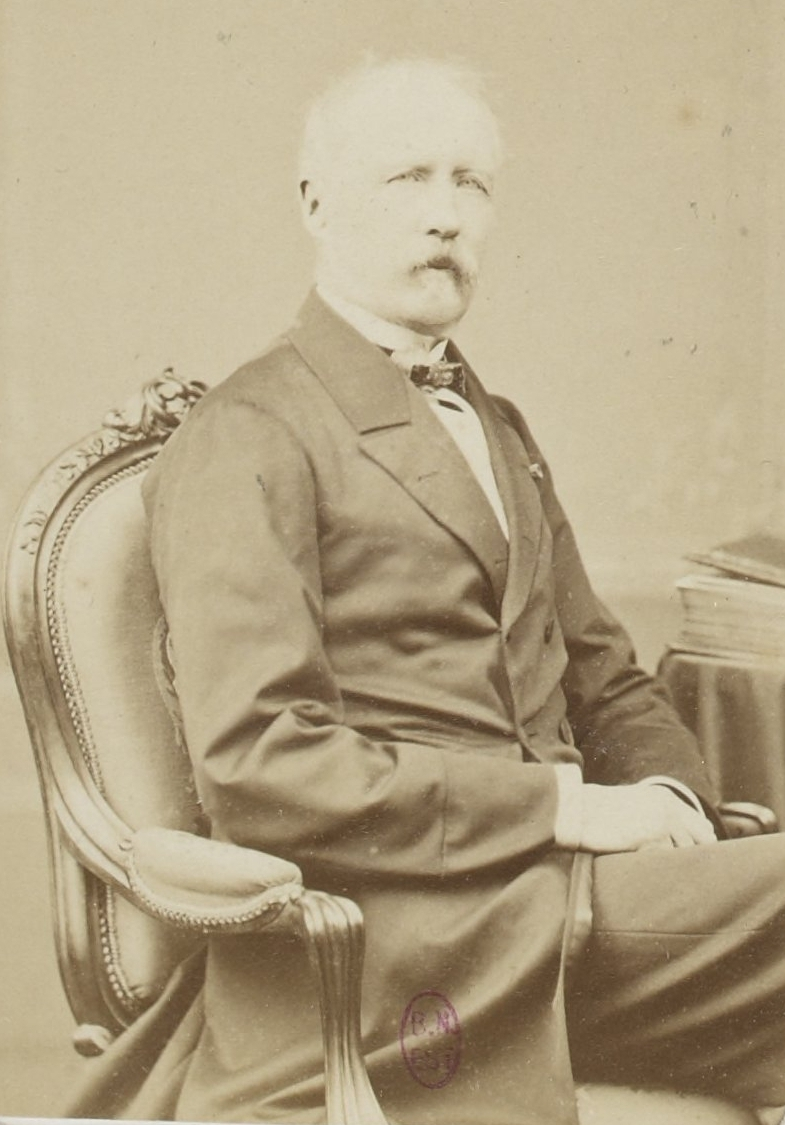
Marshal de MacMahon (1860s, Bibliothèque nationale de France).

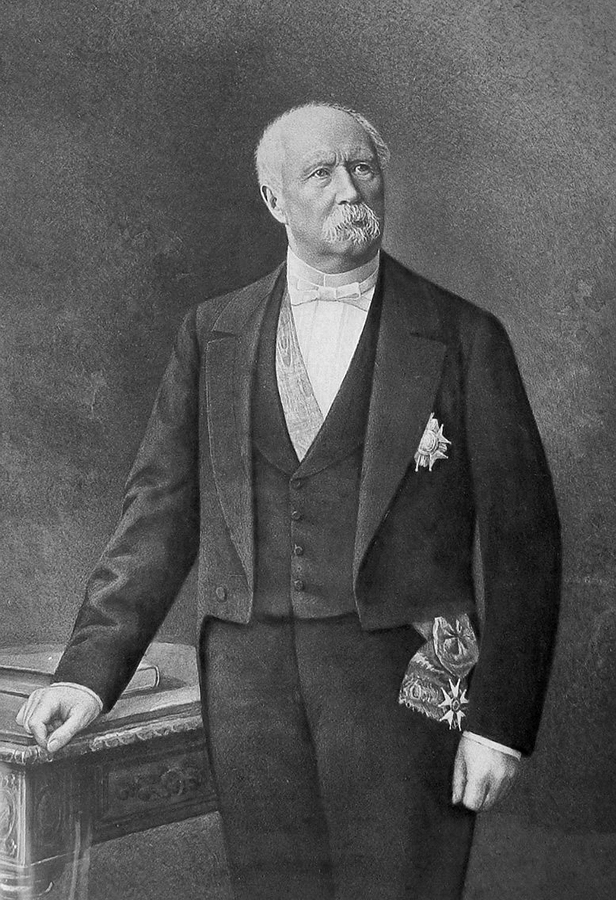
Official portrait of Patrice de MacMahon by Pierre Petit (1873)

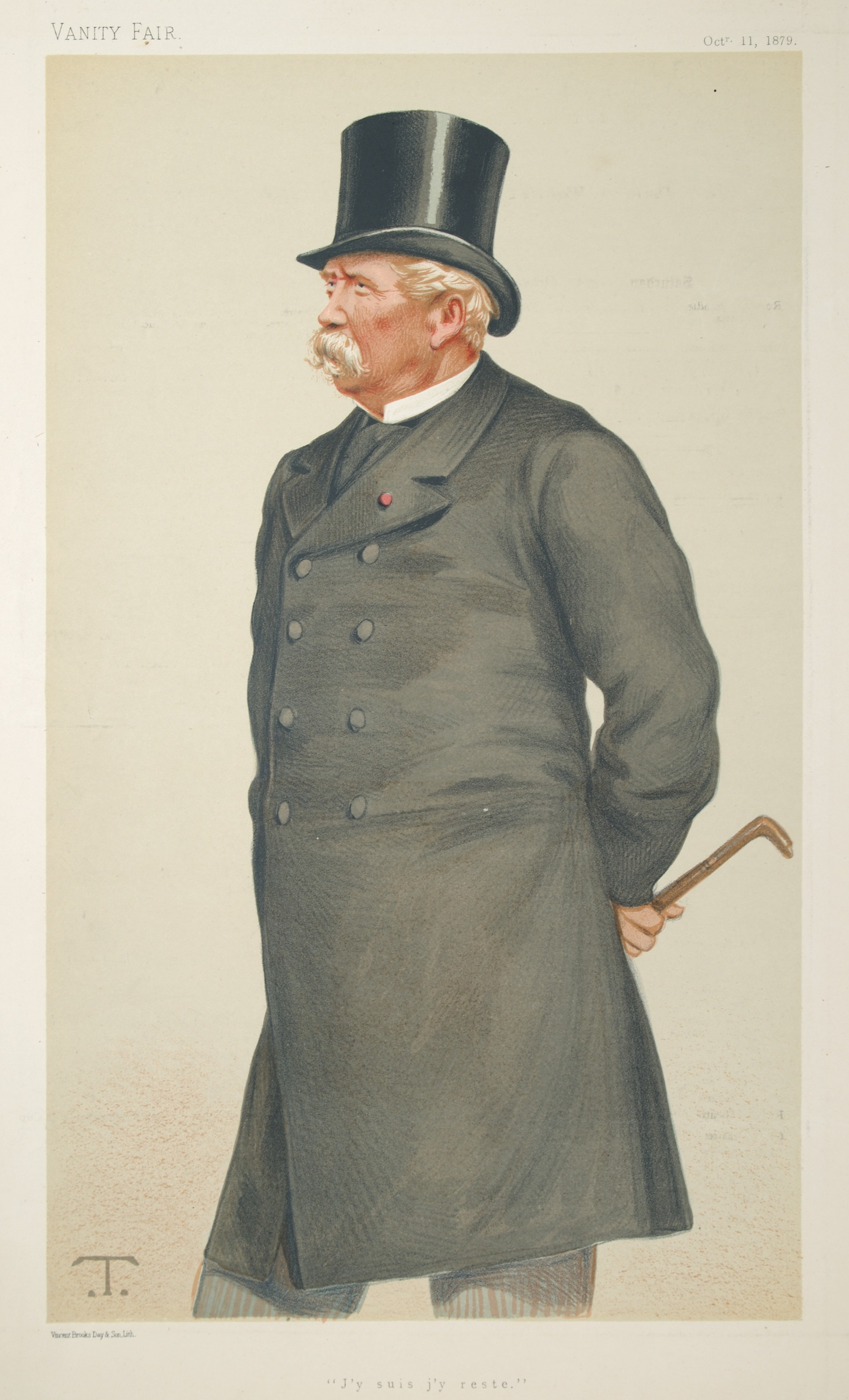
Caricature of Marshal MacMahon by Théobald Chartran for Vanity Fair (1879)

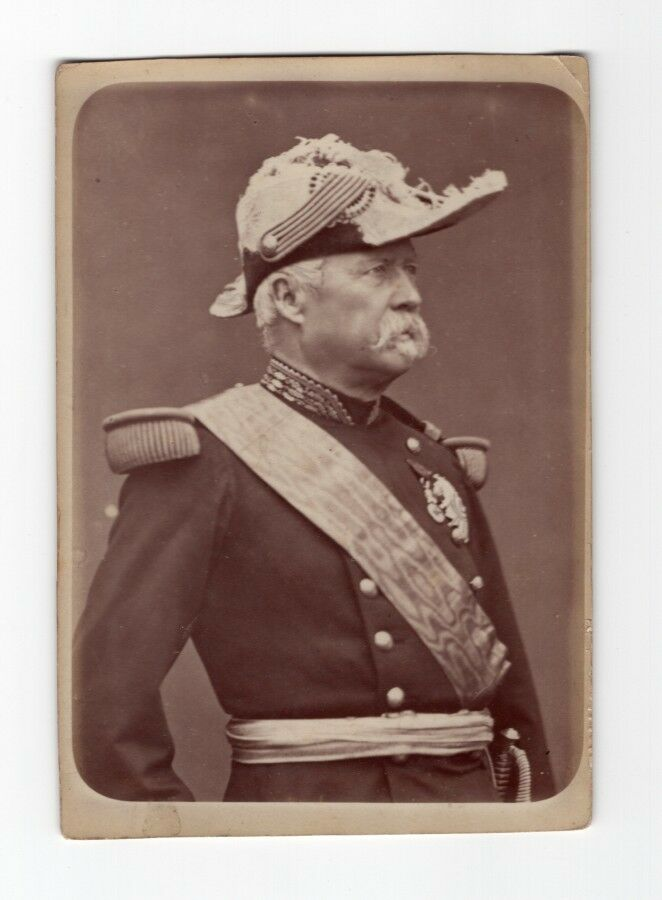
MacMahon, c. 1880–90

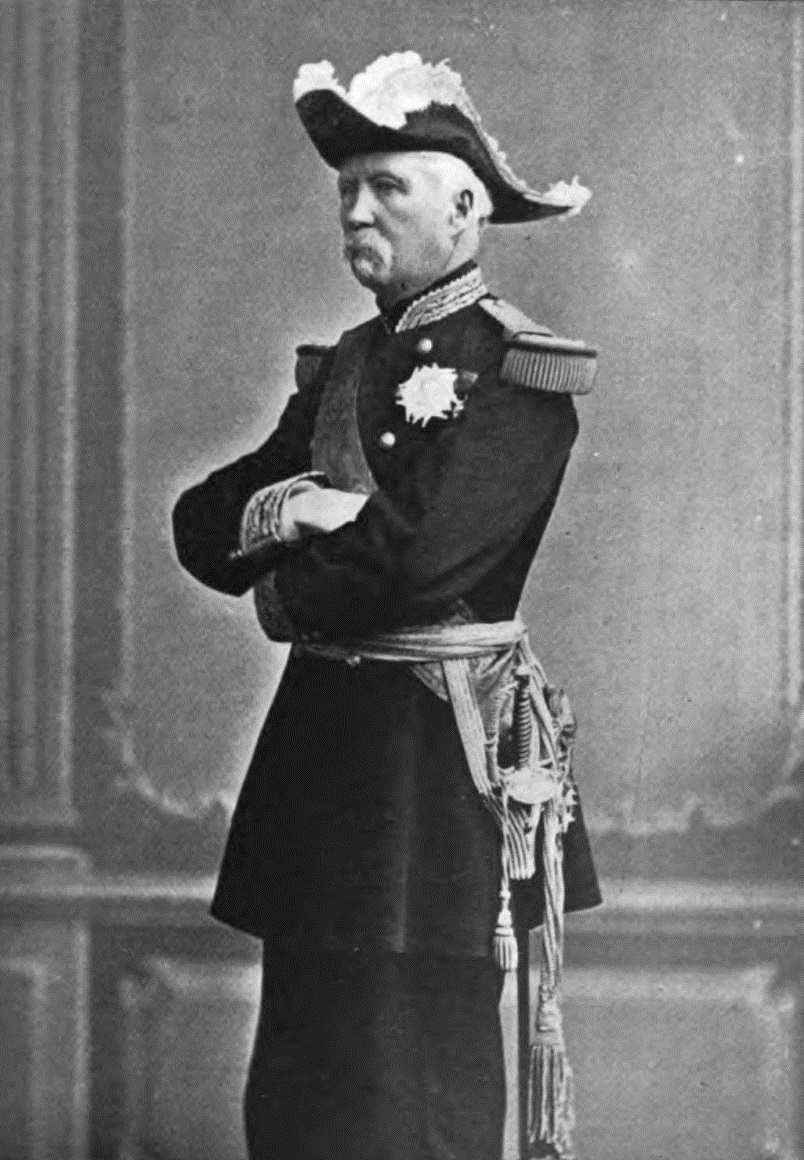
Marshal MacMahon

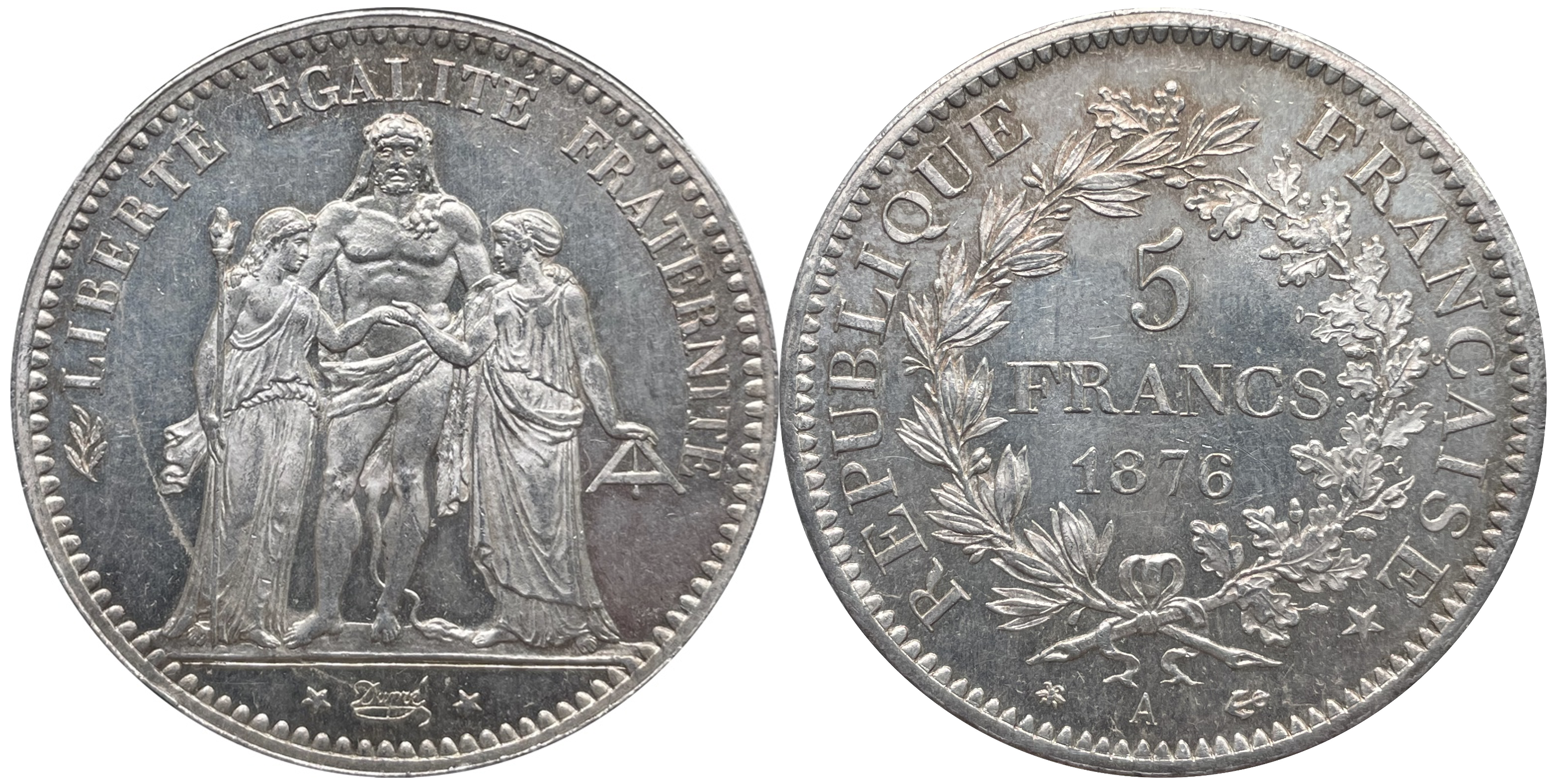
Silver coin: 5 francs of France, 1876, released under President Patrice de MacMahon

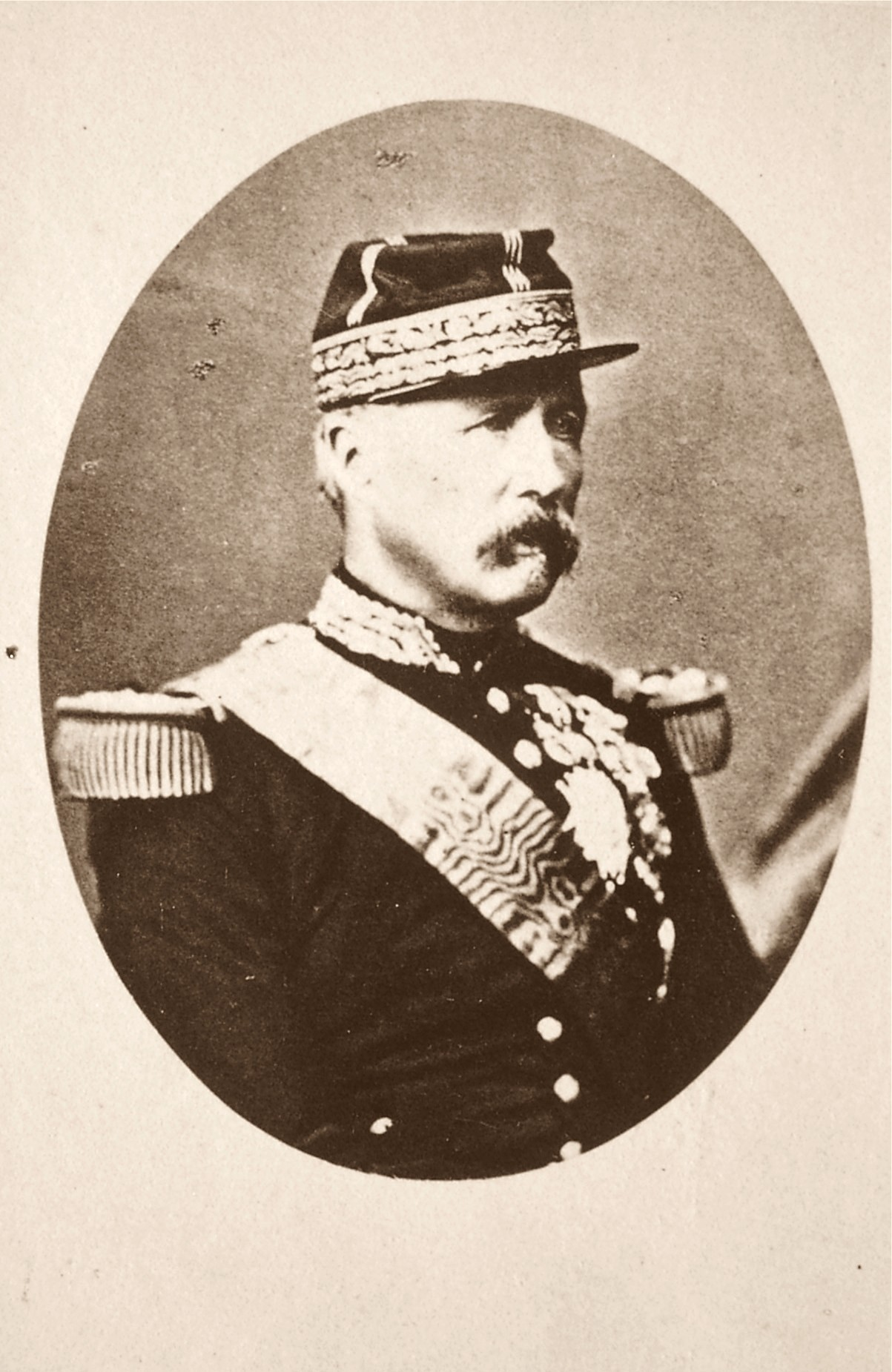
Patrice de MacMahon, Marshal of France

== Arms ==
Figure	Blazon
	Arms of House de MacMahon: "Argent, three leopards (lions passant regardant) gules".
	Arms of House de MacMahon, thereon the "couronne comte" (crown of a count of the Ancien Régime).
	Arms of Duke of Magenta (argent, three leopards gules, a chief of the second semé of mullets of the first) thereon the "couronne ducale" (crown of a duke of the Ancien Régime).

=== Honours ===
- French Empire:
  - Knight of the Legion of Honour, 1830; Officer, 1837; Commander, 1849; Grand Officer, 1853; Grand Cross, 1855; Grand Master, 1873
  - Médaille militaire, 1857
- United Kingdom: Honorary Grand Cross (military) of the Order of the Bath, 3 January 1856
- Kingdom of Sardinia: Knight of the Supreme Order of the Most Holy Annunciation, 5 August 1859
- Sweden-Norway: Knight of the Order of the Seraphim, 26 August 1861
- Kingdom of Prussia: Knight of the Order of the Black Eagle, 18 October 1861
- Denmark: Knight of the Order of the Elephant, 4 May 1869
- Austria-Hungary: Grand Cross of the Order of Saint Stephen, 1874
- Belgium: Grand Cordon (military) of the Order of Leopold, 19 September 1874
- Spain: Knight of the Order of the Golden Fleece, 1 March 1875

==== Battle honours ====
Wounded four times: in 1837, at the Siege of Constantine, a bullet pierced his uniform; in 1840, a bullet pierced his sabre through the rib cage; in 1857 at the battle of Icheriden; and finally seriously on 1 September 1870 at Sedan.

== See also ==
- Origins of the French Foreign Legion
- Marie Louis Henry de Granet-Lacroix de Chabrières
- François Certain de Canrobert
- Jean-Luc Carbuccia
- François Achille Bazaine
- Bourbon-Orléanist Restoration Project

Government offices
Preceded by Edmond-Charles de Martimprey	Governor-General of Algeria; 1864–1870	Succeeded by Louis, Baron Durieu
Political offices
Preceded by Adolphe Thiers	President of France; 1873–1879	Succeeded by Jules Grévy
Regnal titles
Preceded by Adolphe Thiers	Co-Prince of Andorra; 1873–1879; Served alongside: Josep Caixal i Estradé	Succeeded by Jules Grévy
French nobility
New title	Duc de Magenta; 1859–1893	Succeeded by Marie Armand Patrice MacMahon
