= Lusigny =

- Commune
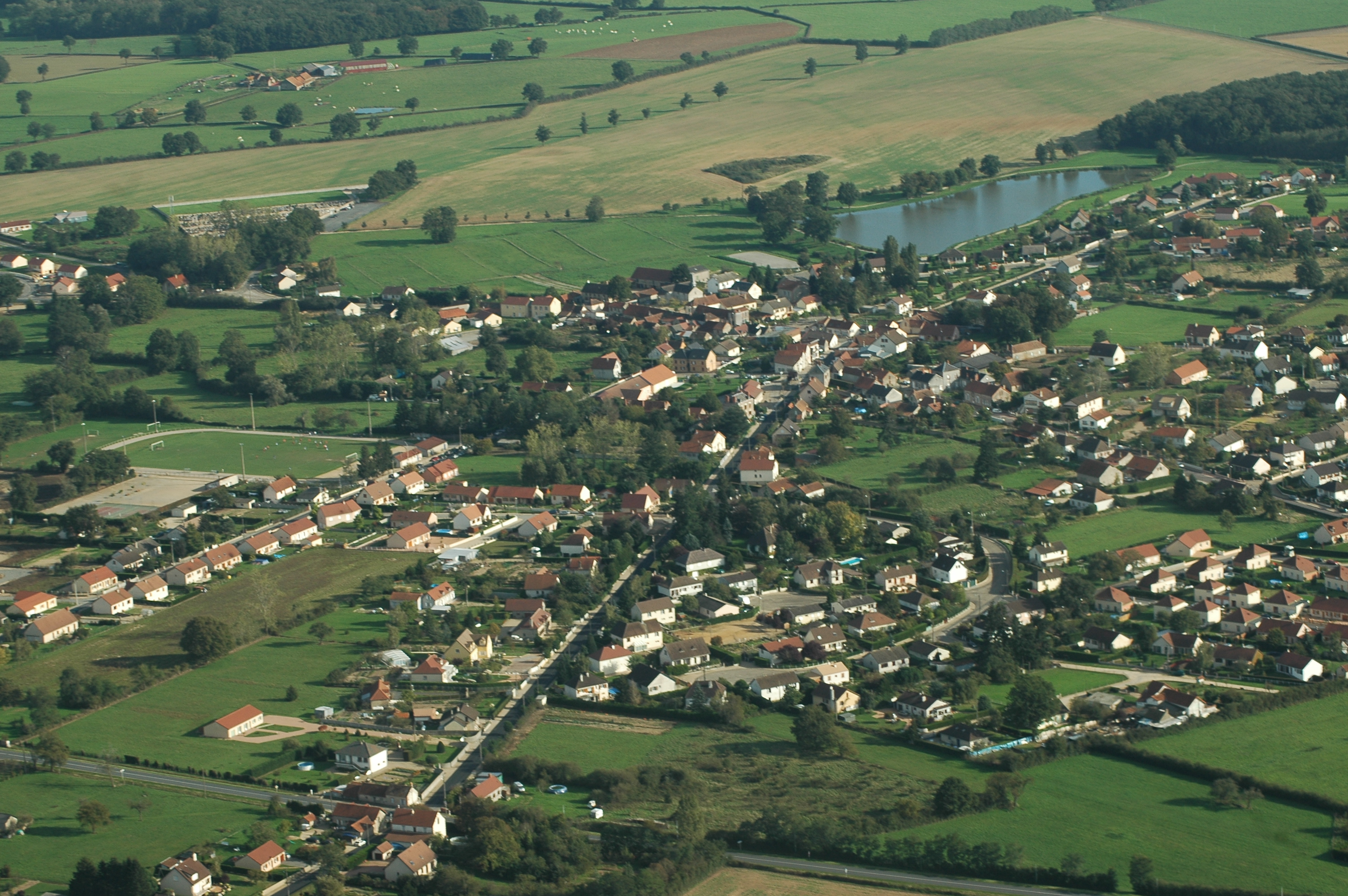
- An aerial view of Lusigny
- Location of Lusigny
- Location within France Location within Auvergne-Rhône-Alpes
- Coordinates: 46°35′19″N 3°29′32″E
- Country: France
- Region: Auvergne-Rhône-Alpes
- Department: Allier
- Arrondissement: Moulins
- Canton: Dompierre-sur-Besbre
- Intercommunality: CA Moulins Communauté

Government
  - Mayor (2026–32): Hubert Degrange
- Area^{1}: 44.55 km^{2} (17.20 sq mi)
- Elevation: 251 m (823 ft)
- Highest elevation: 273 m (896 ft)
- Lowest elevation: 224 m (735 ft)
- Population (2023): 1,620
  - Density: 36.4/km^{2} (94.2/sq mi)
- Time zone: UTC+01:00 (CET)
  - Summer (DST): UTC+02:00 (CEST)
- INSEE/Postal code: 03156 /03230
- ^{1} French Land Register data, which excludes lakes, ponds, glaciers > 1 km^{2} (0.386 sq mi or 247 acres) and river estuaries.

Lusigny (French pronunciation: [lyziɲi]) is a commune in the Allier department in central France, in the Auvergne-Rhône-Alpes region, in the department of Allier. Lusigny is located in the canton of Dompierre-sur-Besbre. It is located 12 kilometres (7.5 mi) from the town of Moulins. Its inhabitants are known as the Lusignois in French.

== Population ==
Historical population
Year	Pop.	±% p.a.
1968	1,066	—
1975	1,295	+2.82%
1982	1,541	+2.52%
1990	1,575	+0.27%
1999	1,428	−1.08%
2007	1,575	+1.23%
2012	1,712	+1.68%
2017	1,698	−0.16%
2023	1,620	−0.78%
Source: INSEE

== See also ==
- Communes of the Allier department
