= Paradou =

Commune in Provence-Alpes-Côte d'Azur, France

- Commune
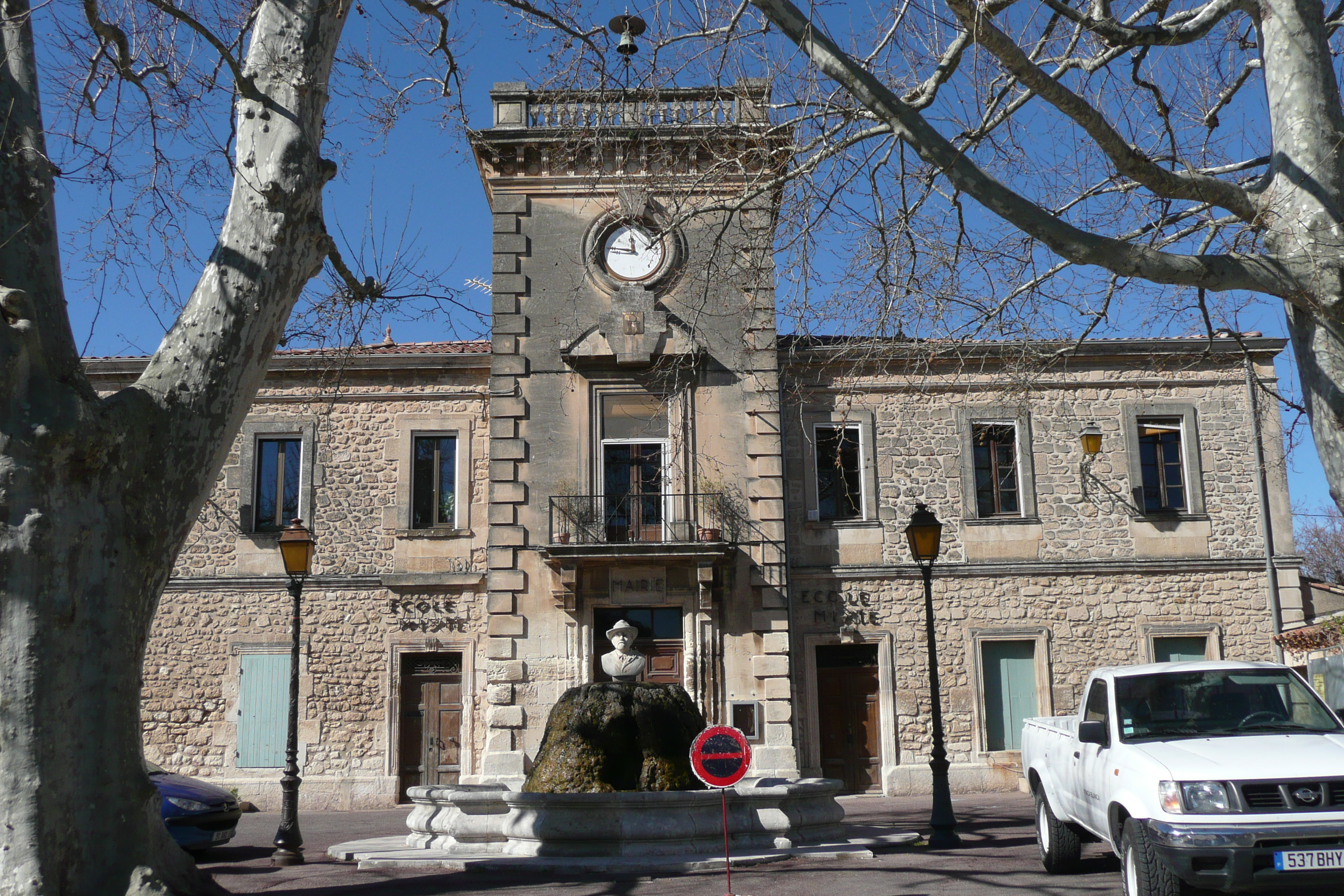
- Town hall

- Coat of arms
- Location of Paradou
- Location within France Location within Provence-Alpes-Côte d'Azur
- Coordinates: 43°43′16″N 4°47′17″E
- Country: France
- Region: Provence-Alpes-Côte d'Azur
- Department: Bouches-du-Rhône
- Arrondissement: Arles
- Canton: Salon-de-Provence-1
- Intercommunality: Vallée des Baux-Alpilles

Government
  - Mayor (2020–2026): Pascale Licari
- Area^{1}: 16.15 km^{2} (6.24 sq mi)
- Highest elevation: 162 m (531 ft)
- Lowest elevation: 0 m (0 ft)
- Population (2023): 2,159
  - Density: 133.7/km^{2} (346.2/sq mi)
- Time zone: UTC+01:00 (CET)
  - Summer (DST): UTC+02:00 (CEST)
- INSEE/Postal code: 13068 /13520
- ^{1} French Land Register data, which excludes lakes, ponds, glaciers > 1 km^{2} (0.386 sq mi or 247 acres) and river estuaries.

Paradou (French pronunciation: [paʁadu], also Le Paradou; Occitan: Lo Parador) is a commune in the Bouches-du-Rhône department in southern France.

== Population ==
Historical population

Year	Pop.	±% p.a.
1800	488	—
1806	456	−1.12%
1821	627	+2.15%
1831	617	−0.16%
1836	631	+0.45%
1841	650	+0.60%
1846	672	+0.67%
1851	669	−0.09%
1856	710	+1.20%
1861	782	+1.95%
1866	801	+0.48%
1872	713	−1.92%
1876	720	+0.24%
1881	678	−1.19%
1886	662	−0.48%
1891	583	−2.51%
1896	616	+1.11%
1901	605	−0.36%

Year	Pop.	±% p.a.
1906	580	−0.84%
1911	622	+1.41%
1921	576	−0.77%
1926	510	−2.40%
1931	547	+1.41%
1936	520	−1.01%
1946	511	−0.17%
1954	516	+0.12%
1962	532	+0.38%
1968	526	−0.19%
1975	640	+2.84%
1982	809	+3.40%
1990	926	+1.70%
1999	1,167	+2.60%
2007	1,276	+1.12%
2012	1,638	+5.12%
2017	2,023	+4.31%
2023	2,159	+1.09%

Source: EHESS and INSEE (1968-2023)

== See also ==
- Alpilles
- Communes of the Bouches-du-Rhône department

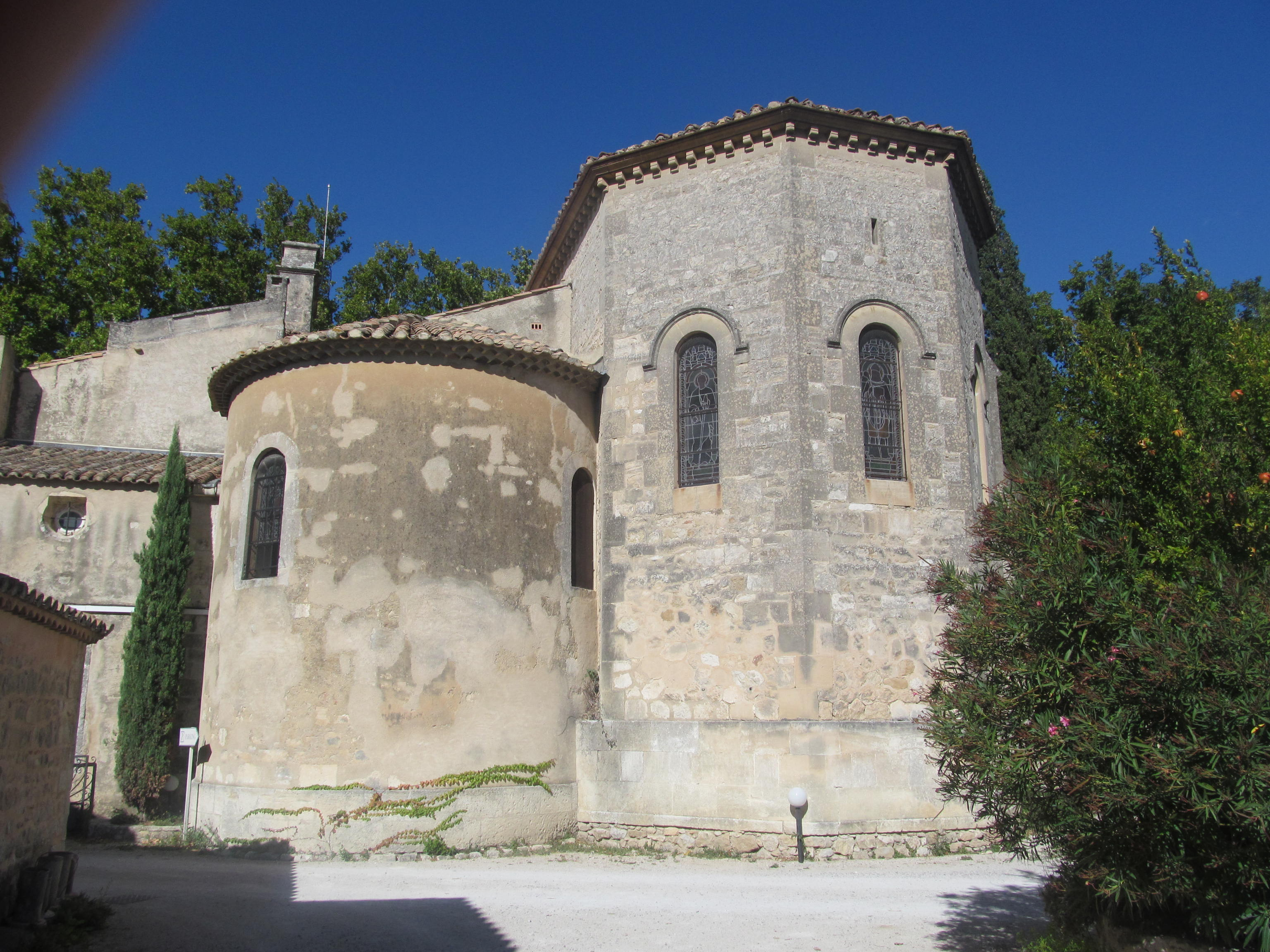
Apses of the Church
