= Château de Sully =

Renaissance châteaux of Burgundy, France

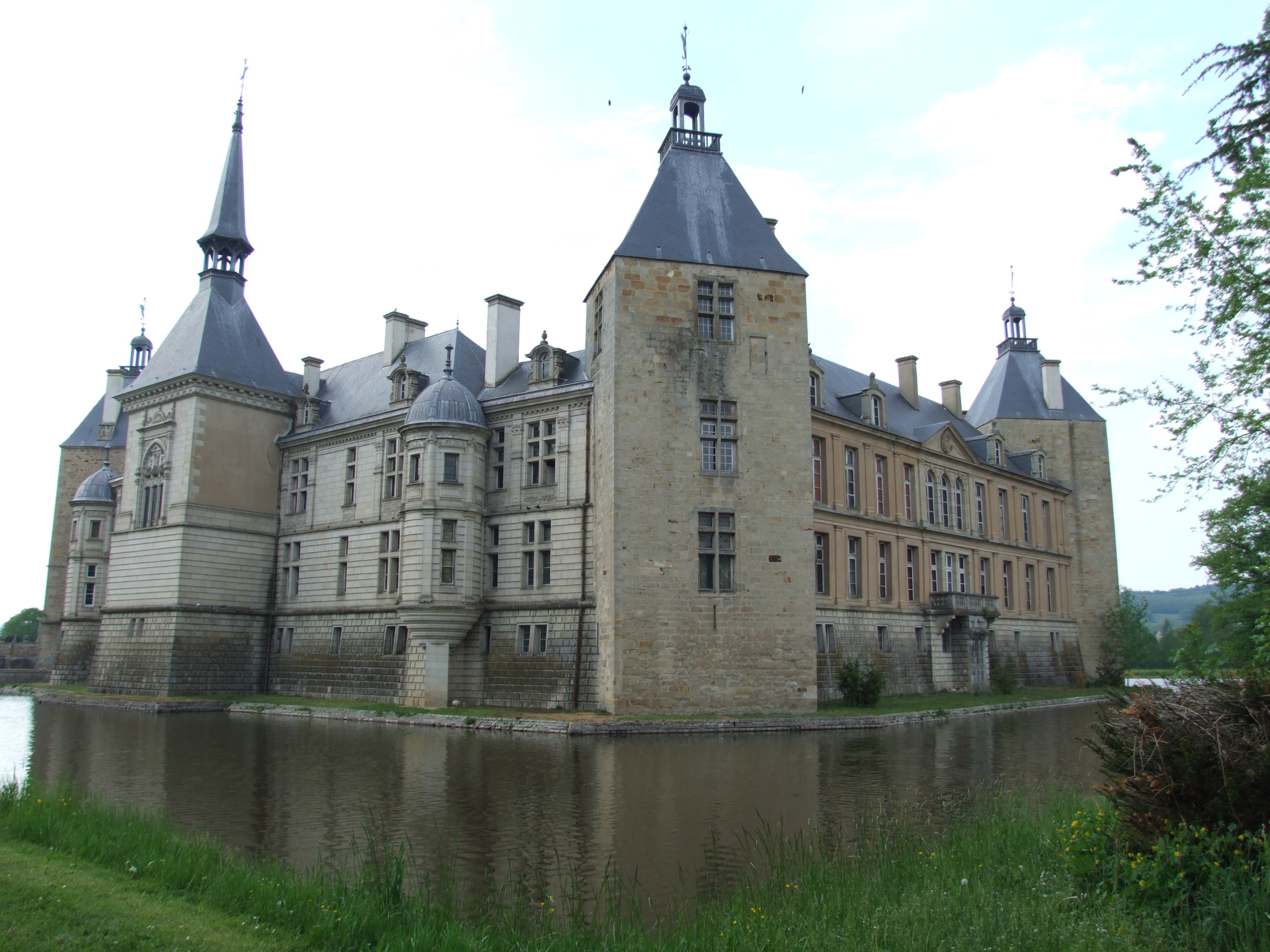
- Château de Sully and moat

- Location within France
- 47°00′39″N 4°28′24″E

History
- Built: 1570-1610
- Built for: Gaspard de Saulx-Tavannes
- Original use: Château

Site notes
- Architect: Nicolas Ribonnier
- Architectural style: Renaissance
- Current use: Tourist attraction and historical research
- Website: http://www.chateaudesully.com/

Monument historique
- Designated: 1995

The Château de Sully, situated between Autun and Beaune (Saône-et-Loire), is the largest of the Renaissance châteaux of southern Burgundy. Paired outbuildings of a more vernacular character face each other across a grassed forecourt, while to the rear is the vegetable garden, fenced by fruit trees. The château is approached by an axial stone bridge across its moat. The façades express the traditionally defensive character of the rez-de-chaussée, the ground floor, and the richer, more open aspect of the piano nobile, articulated by pilasters. Under the central pediment that breaks the line of a traditional sloping slate roof, the arched portal is scaled to admit riders and carriages. Four similarly treated ranges, flanked by matching angled corner towers with pyramidal roofs and surrounded by the moat, enclose a Renaissance courtyard built for the Maréchal de Saulx-Tavanes, confidant of Catherine de' Medici.

The splendor of the interior courtyard shows that this château, though symmetrical and regular, still looks inwards. A rusticated ground floor with arch-headed windows supports a main floor where paired pilaster-defined bays that alternate between windows and coved niches.

The historic chateau of the MacMahon family, from the marriage of the heiress Charlotte de Morey, with Jean-Baptiste de MacMahon, Sully was the birthplace of the monarchist Field Marshal, Patrice MacMahon, duc de Magenta, who was President of the French Third Republic from 1873 to 1879. Charles-Marie and Marthe de Vogüé, Marquise de Mac Mahon, restored some of the château during their ownership of the property. The Château de Sully remains the home of the present duchesse de Magenta and her family.

The château of Henri IV's minister, Maximilien de Béthune and the ducs de Sully, is the Château de Sully-sur-Loire.

== Gallery ==
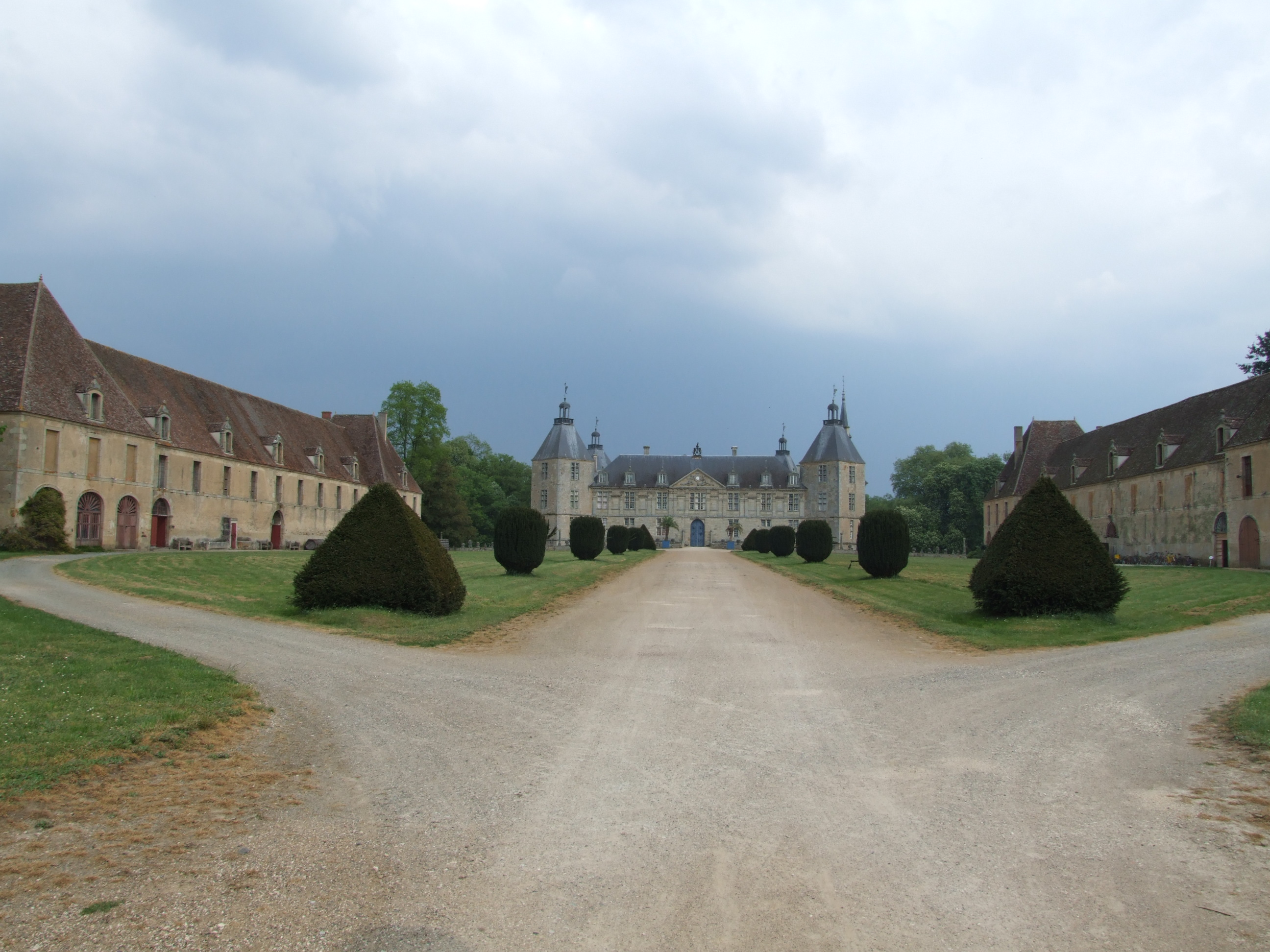
Courtyard alley with Common buildings on either side

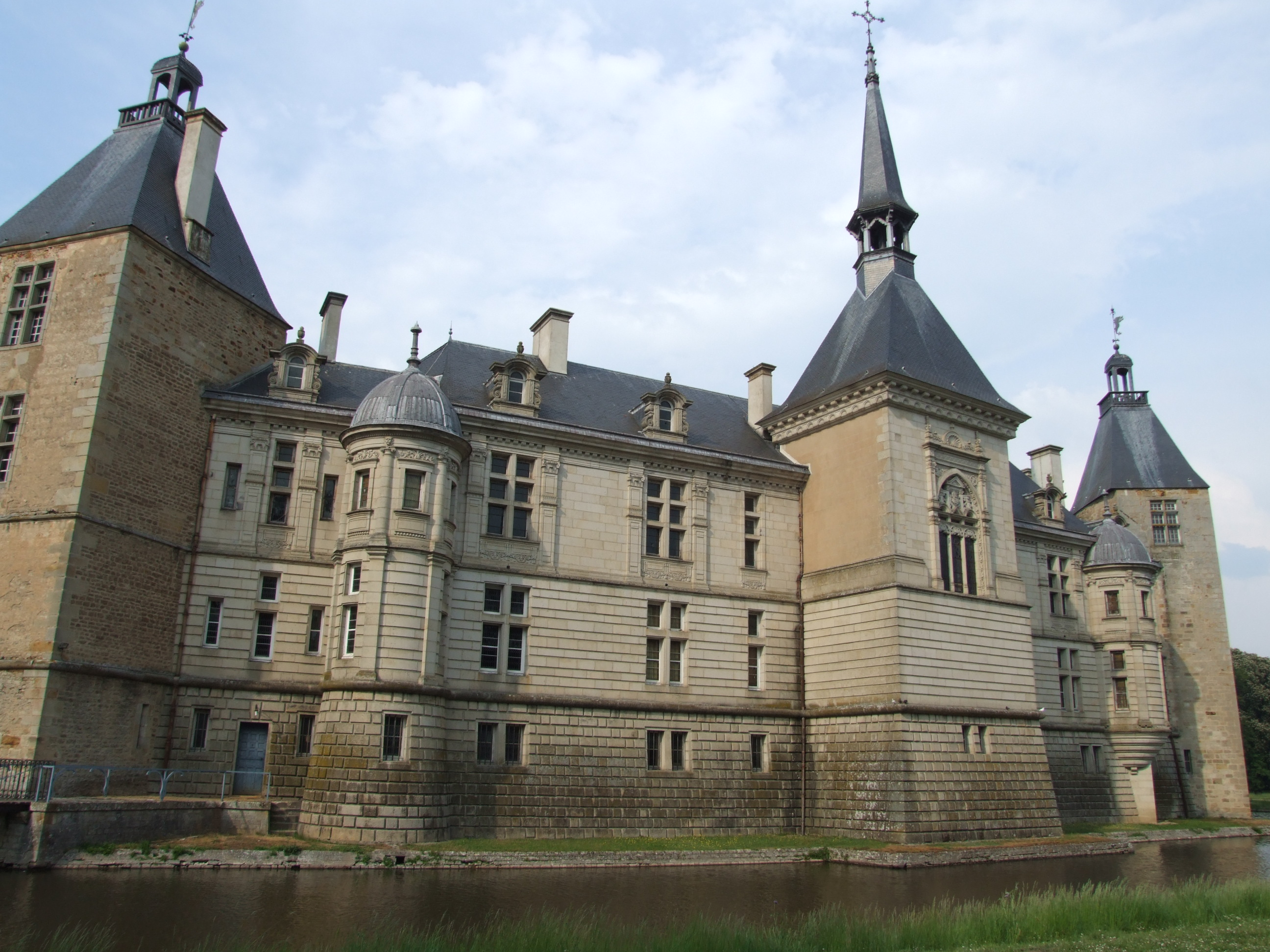
Closeup of the Neo-Renaissance facade of the castle

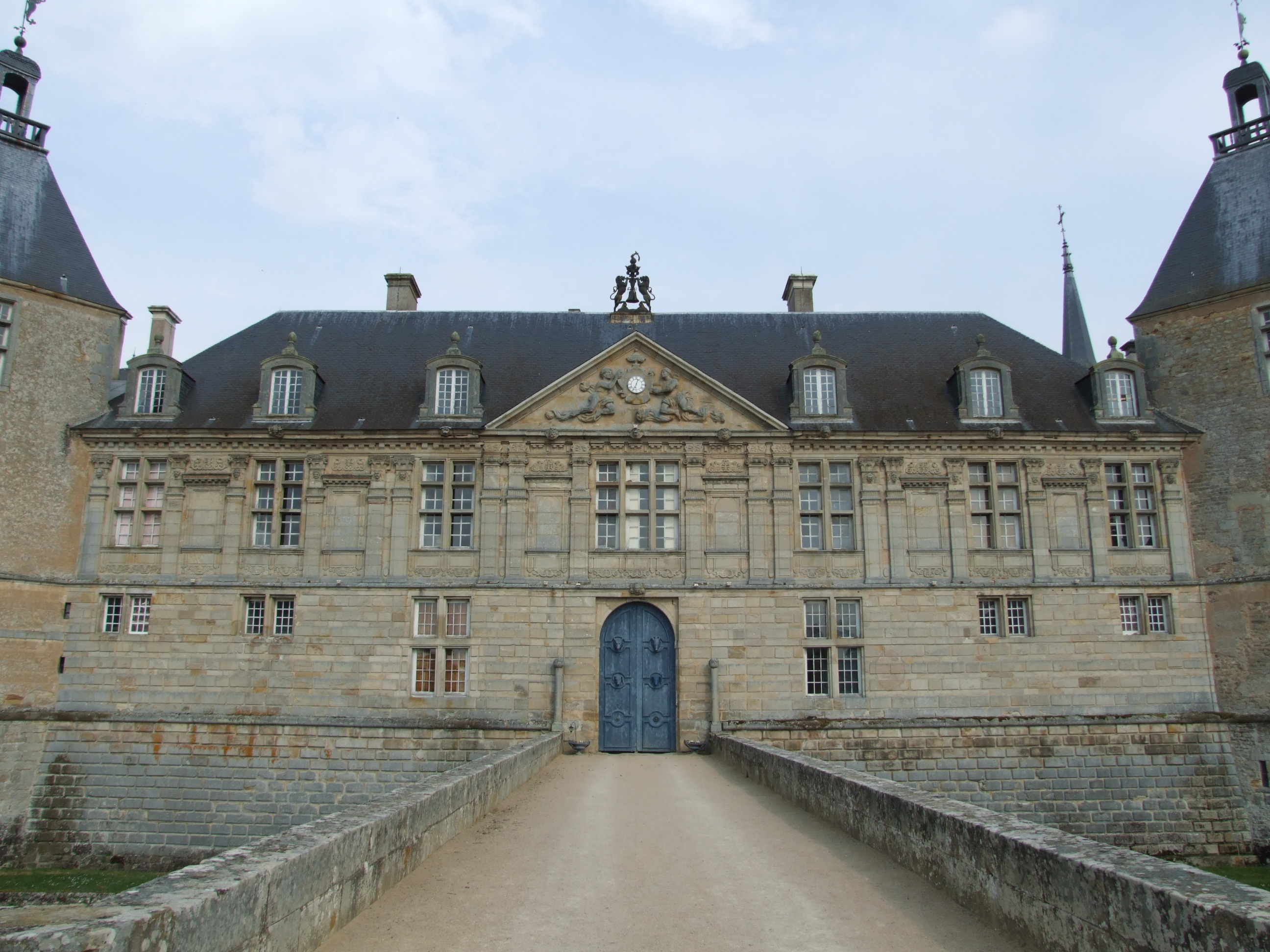
The west facade and the bridge of Pierre
