= Montcresson =

- Commune
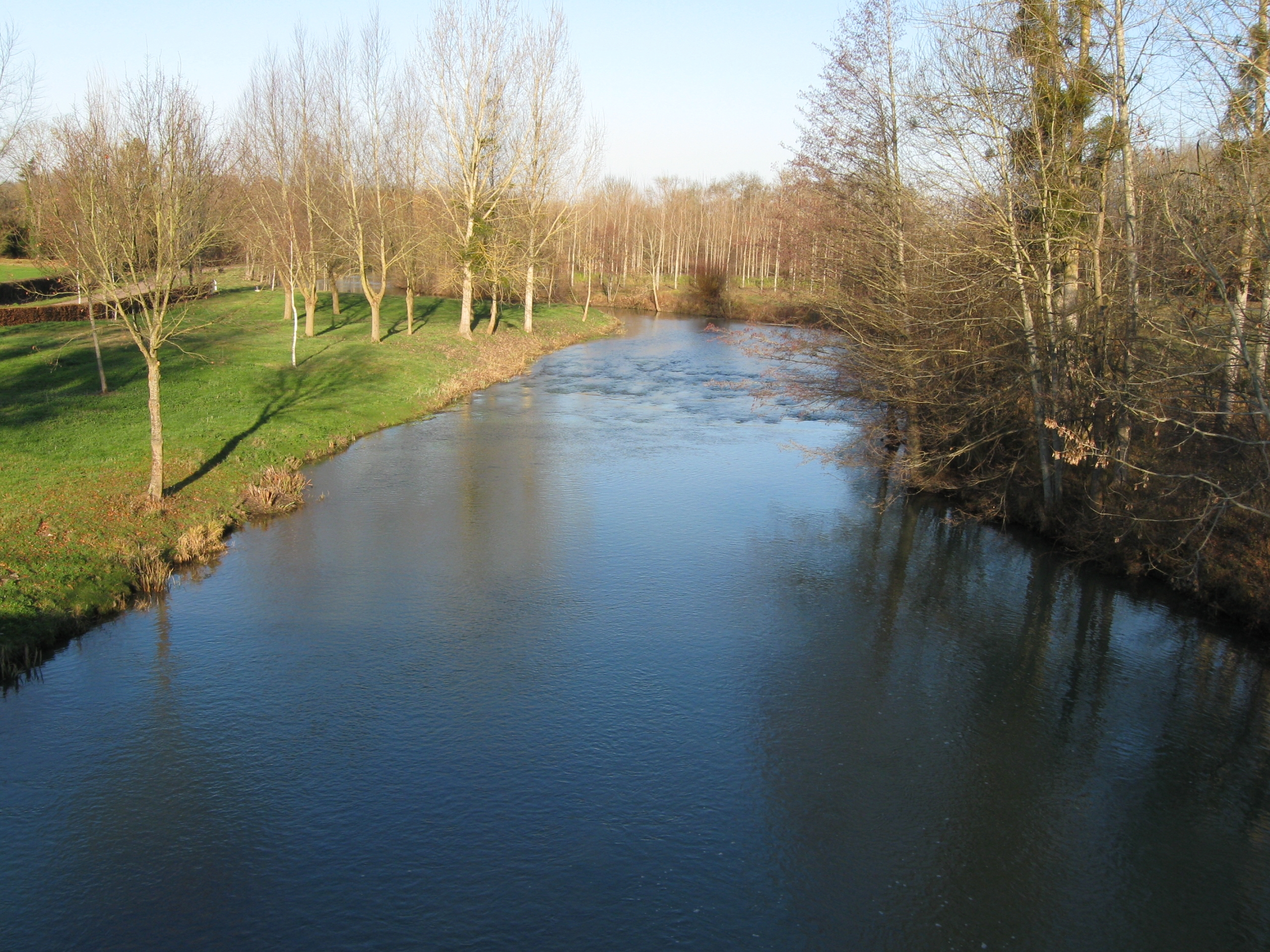
- The Loing in Montcresson

- Coat of arms
- Location of Montcresson
- Location within France Location within Centre-Val de Loire
- Coordinates: 47°54′25″N 2°48′22″E
- Country: France
- Region: Centre-Val de Loire
- Department: Loiret
- Arrondissement: Montargis
- Canton: Lorris
- Intercommunality: Canaux et Forêts en Gâtinais

Government
  - Mayor (2020–2026): Alain Germain
- Area^{1}: 21.00 km^{2} (8.11 sq mi)
- Elevation: 112 m (367 ft)
- Population (2023): 1,262
  - Density: 60.10/km^{2} (155.6/sq mi)
- Demonym: Montcressonnais
- Time zone: UTC+01:00 (CET)
  - Summer (DST): UTC+02:00 (CEST)
- INSEE/Postal code: 45212 /45700
- ^{1} French Land Register data, which excludes lakes, ponds, glaciers > 1 km^{2} (0.386 sq mi or 247 acres) and river estuaries.

Montcresson (French pronunciation: [mɔ̃kʁesɔ̃]) is a commune in the Loiret department in north-central France.

== See also ==
- Communes of the Loiret department
