= Franz Joseph and Saint Anne Cliffs =

- Cliffs
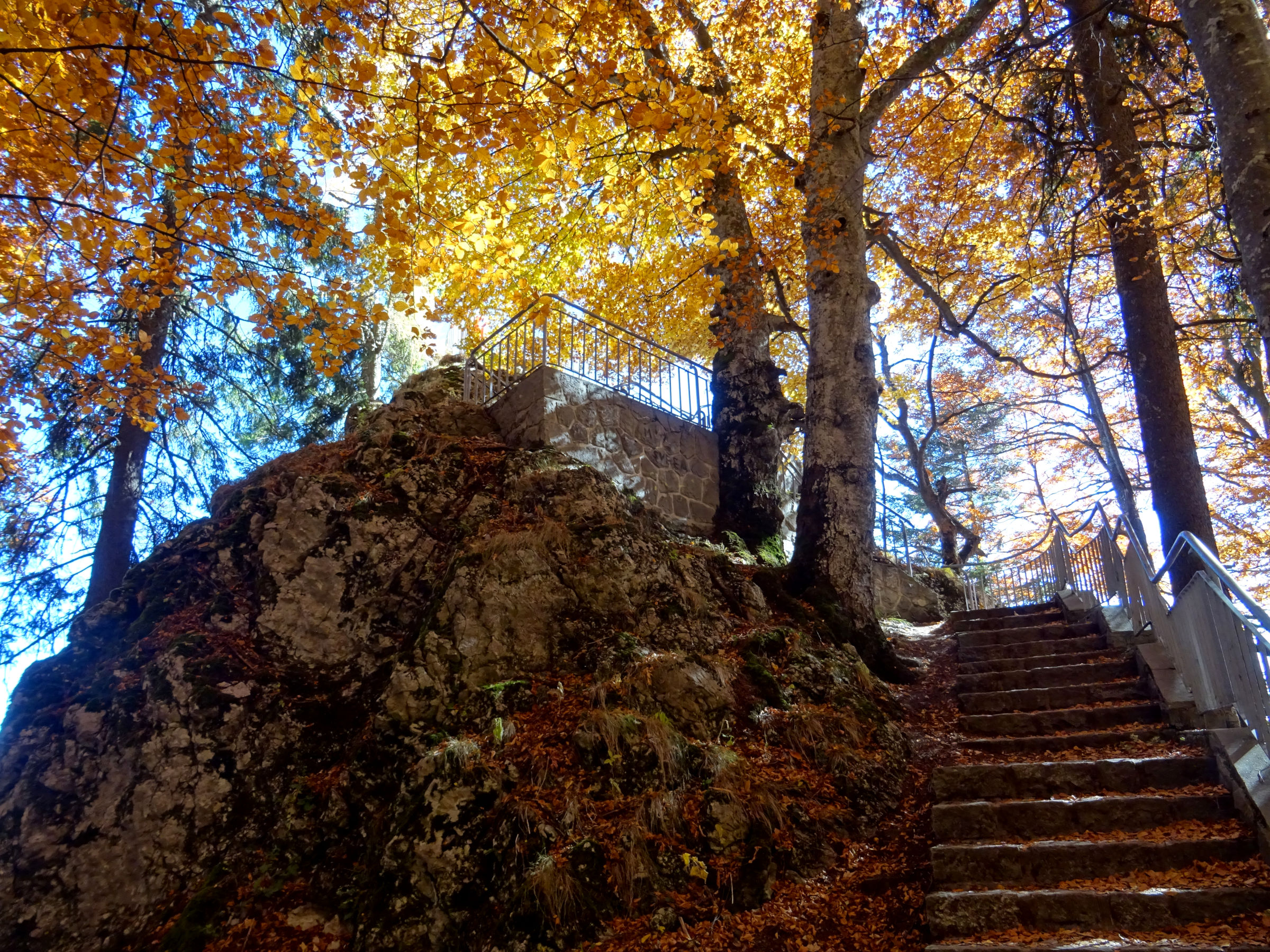
- Franz Joseph's Cliffs: the main lookout rock

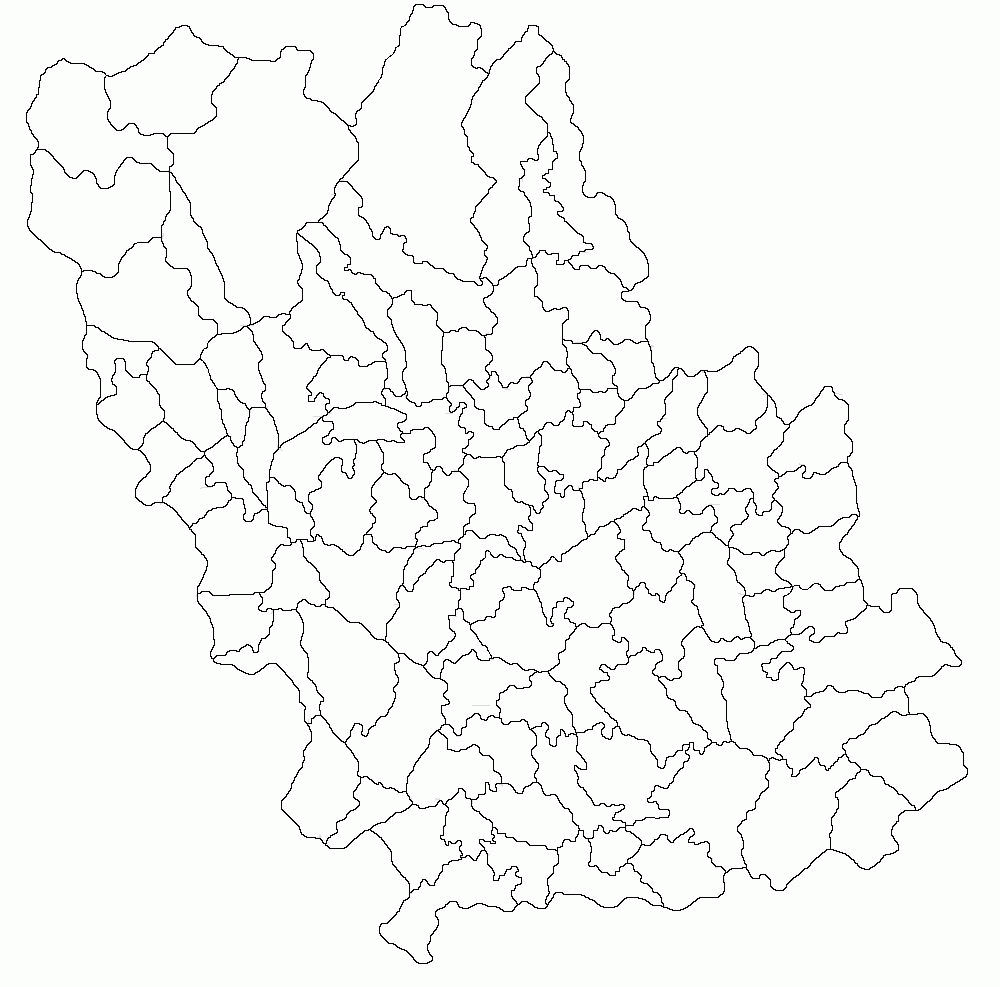
- Coordinates: 45°22′06″N 25°31′31″E
- Location: Bucegi Mountains, Sinaia, Prahova Valley, Romania.

The Franz Joseph's Cliffs (Romanian: Stâncile lui Francisc Iosif) are located in the Bucegi Mountains near Sinaia, Prahova Valley, Romania. They are situated in close proximity to the Royal Meadow, used often by former Romanian monarchs to host feasts for their most important guests.

They have been named by King Carol I of Romania, after Emperor Franz Joseph I of Austria. The stairs and railings have also been added during Carol I's rule. From the top of the cliffs, one can get a clear view of Prahova Valley.

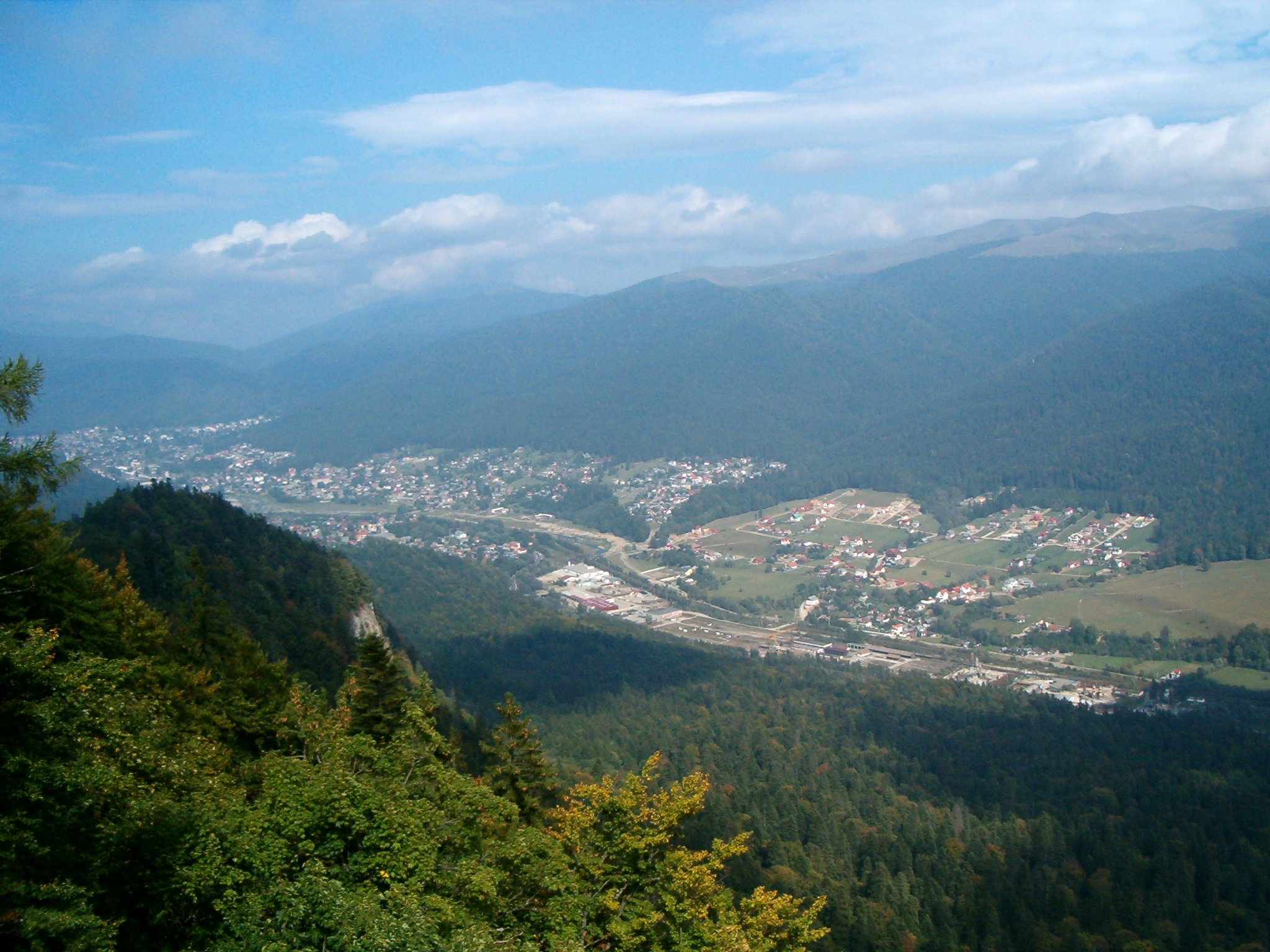
Prahova Valley seen from the Franz Joseph's Cliffs

Saint Anne's Cliff (Romanian: Stânca Sfintei Ana) – At its base, there is a small clearing. The rock wall had once icons on it, whose traces can still be seen today. The small grotto that exists there was once a shelter for a hermit. The cliff is located at the crossroads between the road that goes at Cota 1,400 and the road that goes to Sheepfold Meadow.
