= Bucegi Mountains =

Mountain range in Romania

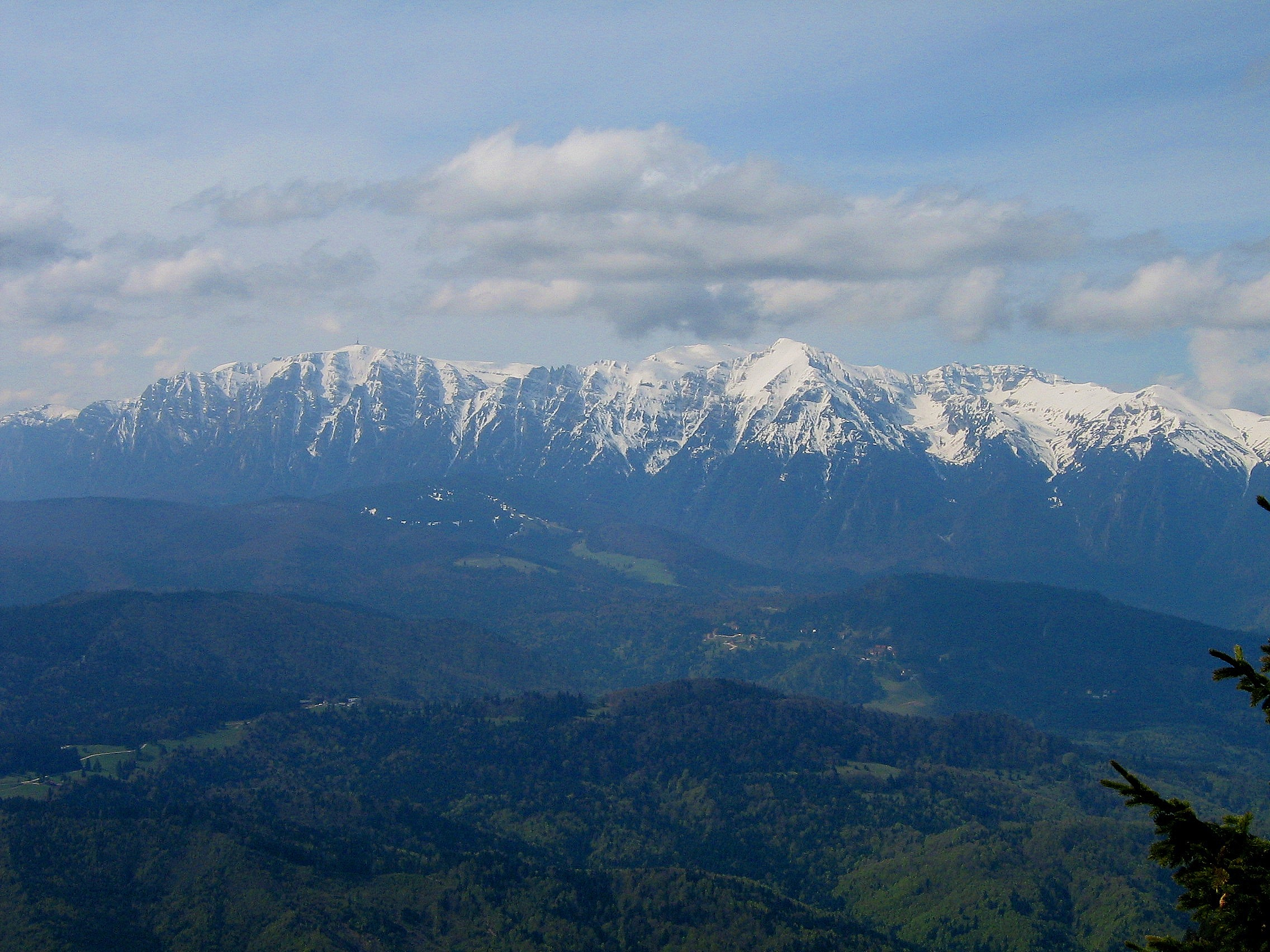

Highest point
- Peak: Omu
- Elevation: 2,505 m (8,219 ft)
- Coordinates: 45°26′44″N 25°27′22″E

Dimensions
- Area: 300 km^{2} (120 mi^{2})

Geography
- Country: Romania
- Counties: Dâmbovița; Prahova; Brașov

Geology
- Orogeny: Alpine
- Rock age: Neogene

The Bucegi Mountains (Romanian: Munții Bucegi [ˈmuntsij buˈtʃedʒʲ]) are located in central Romania, south of the city of Brașov. They are part of the Southern Carpathians group of the Carpathian Mountains. At 2,505 m (8,219 ft), Omu is its highest point.

To the east, the Bucegi Mountains have a very steep slope towards the popular tourist destinations in the Prahova Valley, such as Bușteni and Sinaia. At a higher elevation is the Bucegi Plateau, where wind and rain have turned the rocks into spectacular figures such as the Sphinx and Babele.

The Bucegi is believed to be the Dacian holy mountain Kogainon, on which the God Zalmoxis resided in a cave.

== Name ==
The exact origin of the name "Bucegi" is disputed by philologists. "Buceag" or "bugeac" seems to be the source of the name, a word designating in the language of mountain people both the moss in the forest and the wilderness or the junipers. An archaic version of the name "Bucegi" is "Buceci", name still used today by elders in the mountains, and about which linguists say it is derived from "huceag", "buceag" or "bugeac".

Linguist Sextil Pușcariu claims that the name of Bucșoi, one of the mountains that reach the Omu Peak, derives from "Buc", "Bucur", just as "Buceci", "Bugeci" derives from "Buc" with the same suffix like "Măneciu" or "Moeciu". And "Bucur" is a genuine Dacian name. In Iorgu Iordan's work, Toponimia romînească, the name of the mountains is derived from Slavic buk, meaning "beech".

== Ranges ==
The mountains are grouped in three ranges:

- Bucegi Mountains, with highest point Omu Peak, at 2,505 m (8,219 ft)
- Leaota Mountains, with highest point Leaota Peak, at 2,133 m (6,998 ft)
- Piatra Craiului Mountains, with highest point Baciului Peak, at 2,238 m (7,343 ft)

The Rucăr-Bran Pass separates the Piatra Craiului and Leaota ranges; it was marked by border crossings between Wallachia and Transylvania, and was defended by the Bran Castle.

== Tourism ==
The Bucegi Mountains are bordered by Prahova Valley, an area with the most ski resorts in Romania. Since 1935, part of the Bucegi Mountains has been included in the list of protected areas in Romania, with national park status.

=== Ski resorts ===
Among the most popular ski resorts within the Bucegi Mountains are Sinaia and Bușteni. Nicknamed the "Pearl of the Carpathians", Sinaia offers the possibility of performing winter sports. Ski slopes within the resort are serviced by ski lift, accessible by cable car. The main tourist attractions are Peleș Castle, Pelișor Castle, Royal Station, Sinaia Monastery, Casino, and the George Enescu Memorial House.

Bușteni, located at an altitude of 800–900 m, features a diversified base of accommodation and meals (hotels, rest homes, chalets, tourist stops). A cable car links Silva Hotel and Babele Chalet, on the mountaintops. This area has unusual rock formations, such as the Sphinx and Babele. Bușteni is the starting point of trekking on some of the most attractive routes in the Bucegi Massif. In the winter months, Bușteni offers the possibility of practicing skiing and sleighing. There are ski slopes with varying degrees of difficulty. Bușteni is also a cultural point, featuring Cantacuzino Castle and Cezar Petrescu Memorial Museum. There is a trout farm in the area.

=== Rucăr-Bran Corridor ===
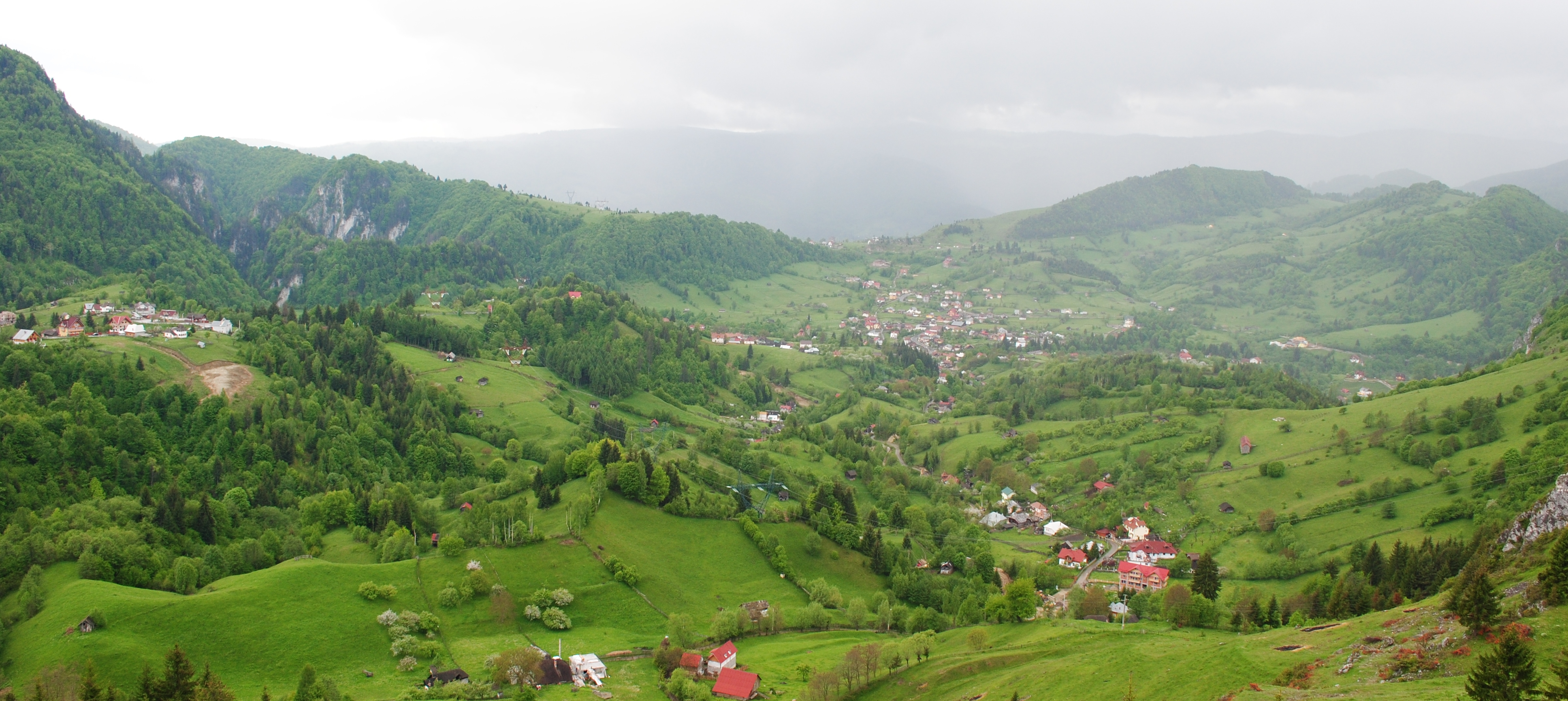
Podu Dâmboviţei village, in the Dâmbovicioara commune, in the Rucăr-Bran Corridor

The Rucăr-Bran Corridor is a mountain pass that has the Bucegi Mountains on one side and the Piatra Craiului Mountains and Iezer-Păpușa Mountains on the other side.

=== Bucegi Natural Park ===
The Bucegi Mountains area, whereof exist references since the 15th century, has been proposed for protection in 1936, due to peerless landscapes and great diversity of plant and animal species. This proposal was taken up only in 1990, when materialized through the Minister's order no. 7/1990. Bucegi Natural Park covers an area of 32,663 hectares across three counties (Dâmbovița, Prahova and Brașov), having more than 60% of the territory covered with forests.
