= Omu Peak =

Mountain in Romania

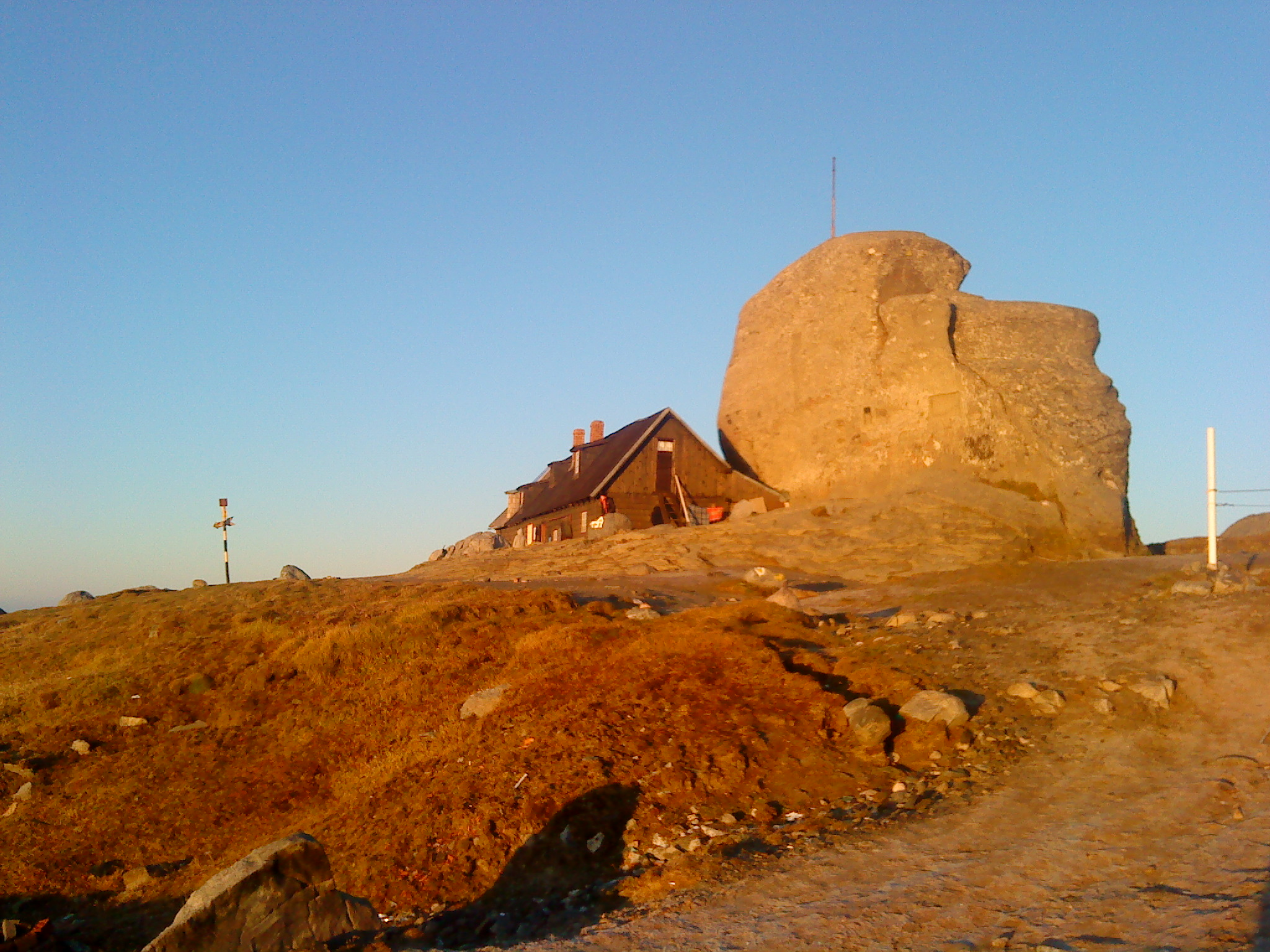
- Cabana Omu

Highest point
- Elevation: 2,505–2,514 m (8,219–8,248 ft)
- Prominence: 1,345 m (4,413 ft)
- Listing: Ribu
- Coordinates: 45°26′44.95″N 25°27′22.72″E

Naming
- Native name: Vârful Omu (Romanian)

Geography
- Location within Romania
- Location: Romania
- Parent range: Bucegi Mountains

Omu Peak (Romanian: Vârful Omu) is a mountain peak of the Bucegi Mountains in Romania. It is located in Brașov, Dâmbovița and Prahova counties.

The top of Omu Peak is flat and sprawling. It houses a weather station and a tourist shelter (Romanian cabana) Omu (2505 m above sea level), which is the highest mountain shelter in the entire Carpathians. The first wooden shelter was built in 1888 on the initiative of the Transylvanian Carpathian Society. Rebuilt many times, it now stands as a stone and wooden building, which offers 30 beds and a buffet. The hostel does not have electricity and running water. It is open from March to November.

The top of the mountain is a rock, several meters tall, which is probably why different sources indicate different heights of the summit at 2,505, 2,507 and 2,514 m above sea level.

== Climate ==
Due to altitude, the climate is alpine (Köppen: ET). The annual average temperature is −1.8 °C (28.8 °F), the hottest month in August is 7.2 °C (45.0 °F), and the coldest month is −10.0 °C (14.0 °F) in February. The annual precipitation is 950.1 millimetres (37.41 in), of which July is the wettest with 140.0 millimetres (5.51 in), while November is the driest with only 49.0 millimetres (1.93 in).

Climate data for Vârful Omu (elevation 2504m, 1991–2020 normals, extremes 1928–present)
Month	Jan	Feb	Mar	Apr	May	Jun	Jul	Aug	Sep	Oct	Nov	Dec	Year
Record high °C (°F)	5.6 (42.1)	7.0 (44.6)	12.2 (54.0)	12.8 (55.0)	16.6 (61.9)	18.1 (64.6)	22.1 (71.8)	20.8 (69.4)	19.2 (66.6)	16.0 (60.8)	13.6 (56.5)	8.2 (46.8)	22.1 (71.8)
Mean daily maximum °C (°F)	−7.2 (19.0)	−7.2 (19.0)	−5.0 (23.0)	−0.9 (30.4)	3.6 (38.5)	7.6 (45.7)	9.8 (49.6)	10.3 (50.5)	6.0 (42.8)	2.7 (36.9)	−1.3 (29.7)	−5.6 (21.9)	1.1 (34.0)
Daily mean °C (°F)	−9.9 (14.2)	−10.0 (14.0)	−8.1 (17.4)	−3.8 (25.2)	1.0 (33.8)	4.8 (40.6)	6.8 (44.2)	7.2 (45.0)	3.1 (37.6)	−0.1 (31.8)	−4.0 (24.8)	−8.2 (17.2)	−1.8 (28.8)
Mean daily minimum °C (°F)	−12.5 (9.5)	−12.6 (9.3)	−10.7 (12.7)	−6.2 (20.8)	−1.2 (29.8)	2.5 (36.5)	4.3 (39.7)	4.8 (40.6)	0.9 (33.6)	−2.6 (27.3)	−6.5 (20.3)	−10.7 (12.7)	−4.2 (24.4)
Record low °C (°F)	−32.3 (−26.1)	−38.0 (−36.4)	−29.6 (−21.3)	−25.0 (−13.0)	−14.0 (6.8)	−12.0 (10.4)	−8.0 (17.6)	−7.0 (19.4)	−15.0 (5.0)	−19.0 (−2.2)	−30.8 (−23.4)	−32.4 (−26.3)	−38.0 (−36.4)
Average precipitation mm (inches)	51.2 (2.02)	50.5 (1.99)	63.9 (2.52)	64.6 (2.54)	98.2 (3.87)	139.9 (5.51)	140.0 (5.51)	105.5 (4.15)	70.5 (2.78)	60.3 (2.37)	49.0 (1.93)	56.5 (2.22)	950.1 (37.41)
Average precipitation days (≥ 1.0 mm)	10.2	10.8	12.5	13.3	16.2	14.9	14.3	10.7	9.1	8.4	8.7	10.2	139.3
Average snowy days	30.5	27.6	30.9	30.0	26.6	8.4	0.3	0.2	4.1	11.4	19.6	30.0	219.6
Source 1: NOAA, Meteomanz (extremes since 2021)
Source 2: Administrația Națională de Meteorologie (extremes (Note: The following data is compiled by Altervista based on data from Meteo România, with 4 sets of suspicious data removed.))
