= Sinaia Monastery =

Monastery in Prahova County, Romania

Coordinates: 45°21′19″N 25°32′59″E

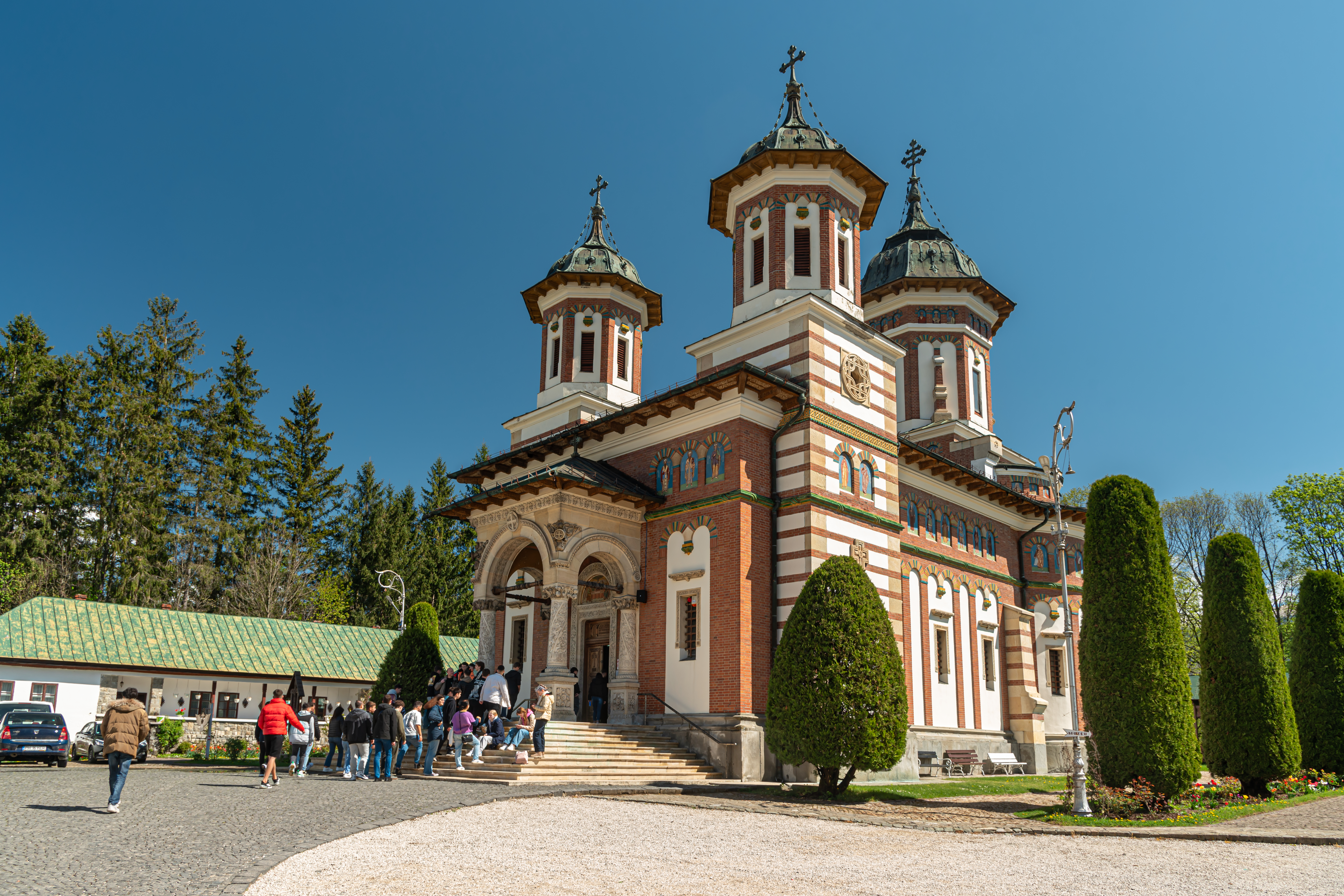
The Great Church at the Sinaia Monastery

The Sinaia Monastery, located in Sinaia, in Prahova County, Romania, was founded by Prince Mihail Cantacuzino in 1695 and named after the great Saint Catherine's Monastery on Mount Sinai in Egypt. As of 2005, it is inhabited by 13 Christian Orthodox monks led by hegumen Macarie Boguș. It is part of the Archdiocese of Bucharest.

== Overview ==
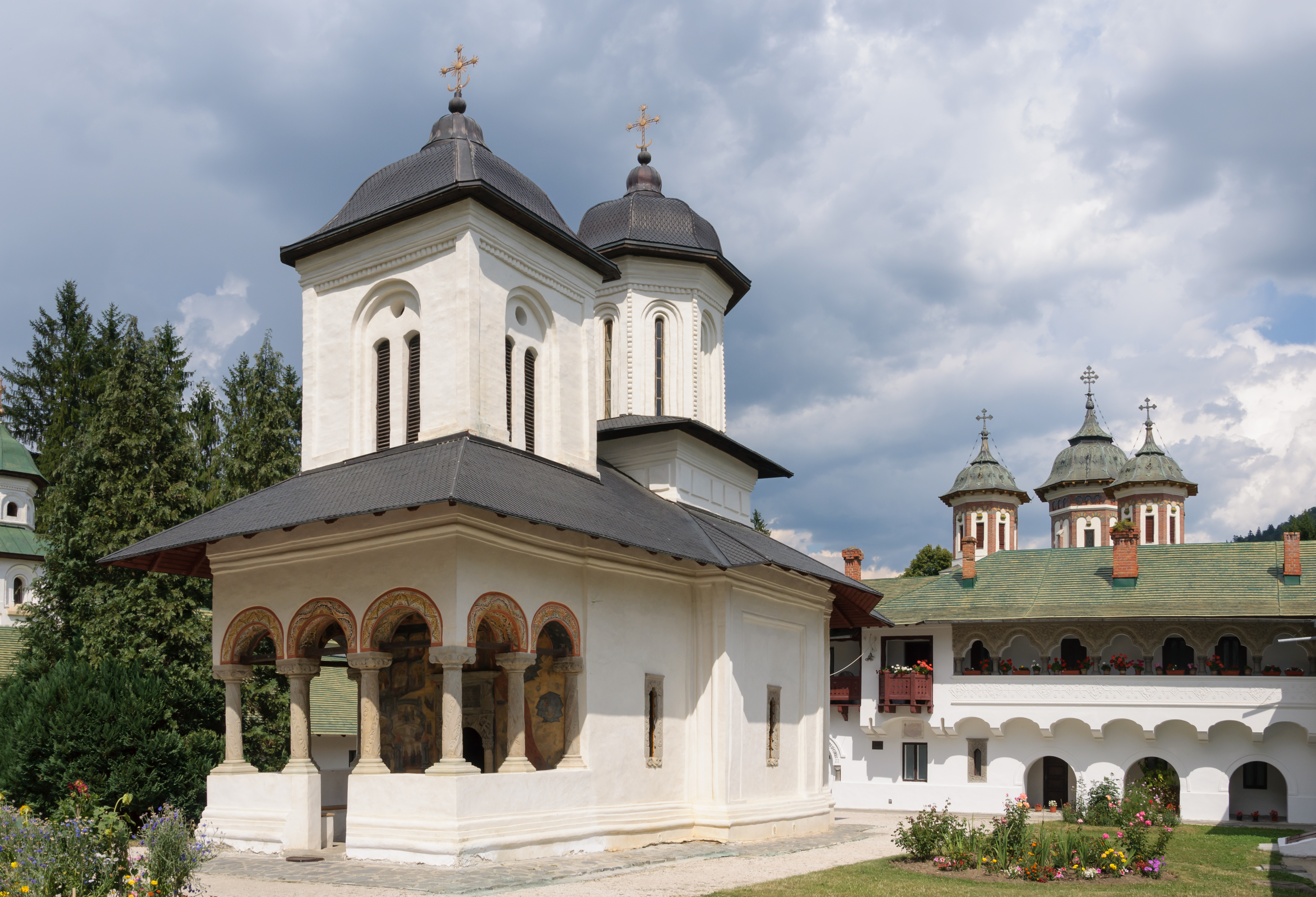
"Biserica Veche" (The Old Church) at the Sinaia Monastery

Situated in the Prahova Valley, the monastery gave its name to the nearby town of Sinaia. The monastery consists of two courtyards surrounded by low buildings. In the centre of each courtyard there is a small church built in the Byzantine style. One of them—"Biserica Veche" (The Old Church)—dates from 1695, while the more recent "Biserica Mare" (The Great Church) was built in 1846.

The monks possess a library that is a repository for valuable jewels belonging to the Cantacuzino family, as well as the earliest Romanian translation of the Bible, dated 1668.

Take Ionescu, former Prime Minister of Romania, is buried on the grounds.

== History ==
Prince (Spătarul) Mihail Cantacuzino founded the monastery upon his return from a pilgrimage to Mount Sinai. The first buildings were completed between 1690 and 1695. It was designed to serve as a monastery as well as a fortified stronghold on the route from Brasov to Bucharest.

The initial plan was for the monastery to hold 12 monks, to imitate the Twelve Apostles, but in time the number of monks grew.

In the midst of the Russo-Turkish War, 1735–1739, before deserting the monastery, monks hid the valuables by burying them inside a bell. During a battle, the Turks defeated troops stationed within the walls of the monastery. The Ottomans burned the area and broke through the wall in two places.

Until 1850, Sinaia consisted of little more than the monastery and a group of huts. In 1864, however, the monastic estate was assigned to the Board of Civil Hospitals (Eforia Spitalelor Civile), which opened a hospital and several baths, and helped develop mineral springs in Sinaia.

In 1948, the monastery was put under the patronage of the Archdiocese of Bucharest from the Board of Civil Hospitals. The Romanian Patriarch, Justinian Marina, restored the buildings between the years 1951 and 1957 with money from the Archdiocese. During this period, the whole monastery was fitted with running water, electricity, and natural gas. Thanks to the efforts of King Carol I, the Great Church of the monastery became the first church to use electric lights in Romania.

== The Old Church ==
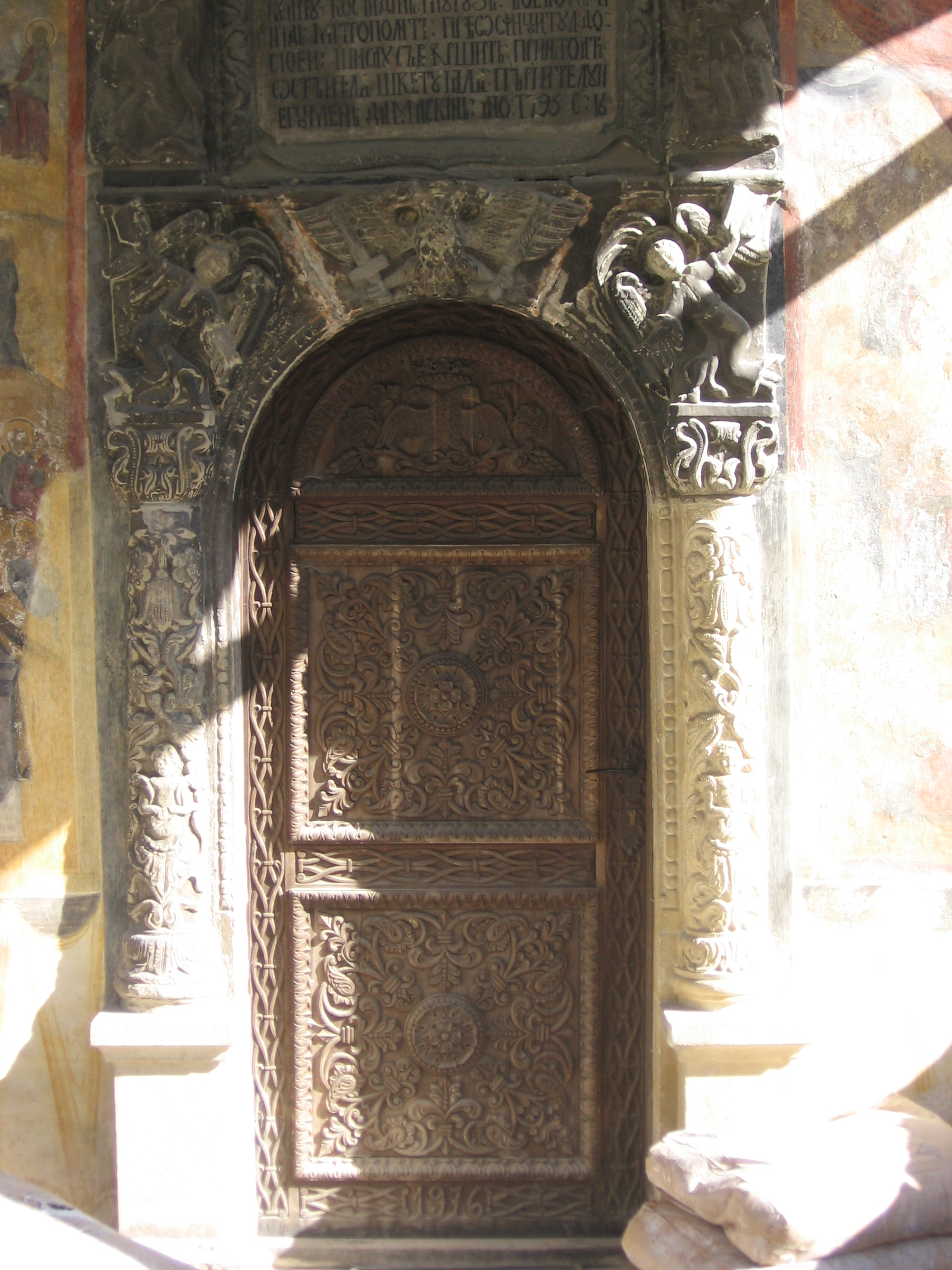
The entrance door of the Old Church

The Old Church was built in 1695. In 2006, it was closed to begin a restoration project to return it to its former beauty. The original interior painting was completed by Pârvu Mutu and were restored for the first time in 1795. The Old Church has reopened as of 2016.

== The Great Church ==
Under the leadership of Hegumens Ioasaf and Paisie, construction of The Great Church began in 1842 using funds allocated by the monastery and was completed in 1846. This smaller structure was enlarged by the Board of Civil Hospitals during a period from 1897 to 1903. These efforts gave the building the appearance it has today.

=== Current appearance ===
Created by architect George Mandrea, the structure utilizes the Moldavian style and the Brâncovenesc style from Walachia. It is said that the belt of three green enamel lines that encircle the building represent the unity of the Holy Trinity in one God and the unity of the Three Romanian Kingdoms in one country.

=== Paintings ===
The gold mosaic paintings were created by Danish artist Aage Exner in a typical neo-Byzantine style. The main illustrations show five persons:

- Iosif Gheorghian mitropolit primat – he re-opened the building in 1903
- Carol I of Romania – shown dressed as an officer, with his right hand upon a rock pillar with a missing piece. This symbolizes the missing Romanian territories at that time
- Elisabeth of Wied – Queen consort of Romania, known in the literary world as Carmen Sylva
- Princess Maria of Romania – Queen Elisabeta's only child, who died at an early age
- Mihail Cantacuzino – builder of the Old Church

=== Furniture ===
The furniture was made of wood (sycamore, maple, and oak) by Constantin Babic and his students at the Bucharest Art School (Ṣcoala de Arte si Meserii). The King's throne displays the royal emblem and the motto Nihil sine Deo (Nothing without God). The Queen's throne is embossed with the letters E.D. Both thrones are gold-plated.

The two Russian icons, of Saint Serghei and Saint Nicholas, were a gift from Tsar Nicholas II of Russia in 1903. They were presented to the Hegumen Nifon Arhimandritul for the baptism of Prince Nicholae, son of King Ferdinand.

A remarkable piece adorning the monastery is the epitaphios by Anna Roth, made of silk and gold on a cotton base. It took three years (from 1897 to 1900) to finish.

== The bell tower ==
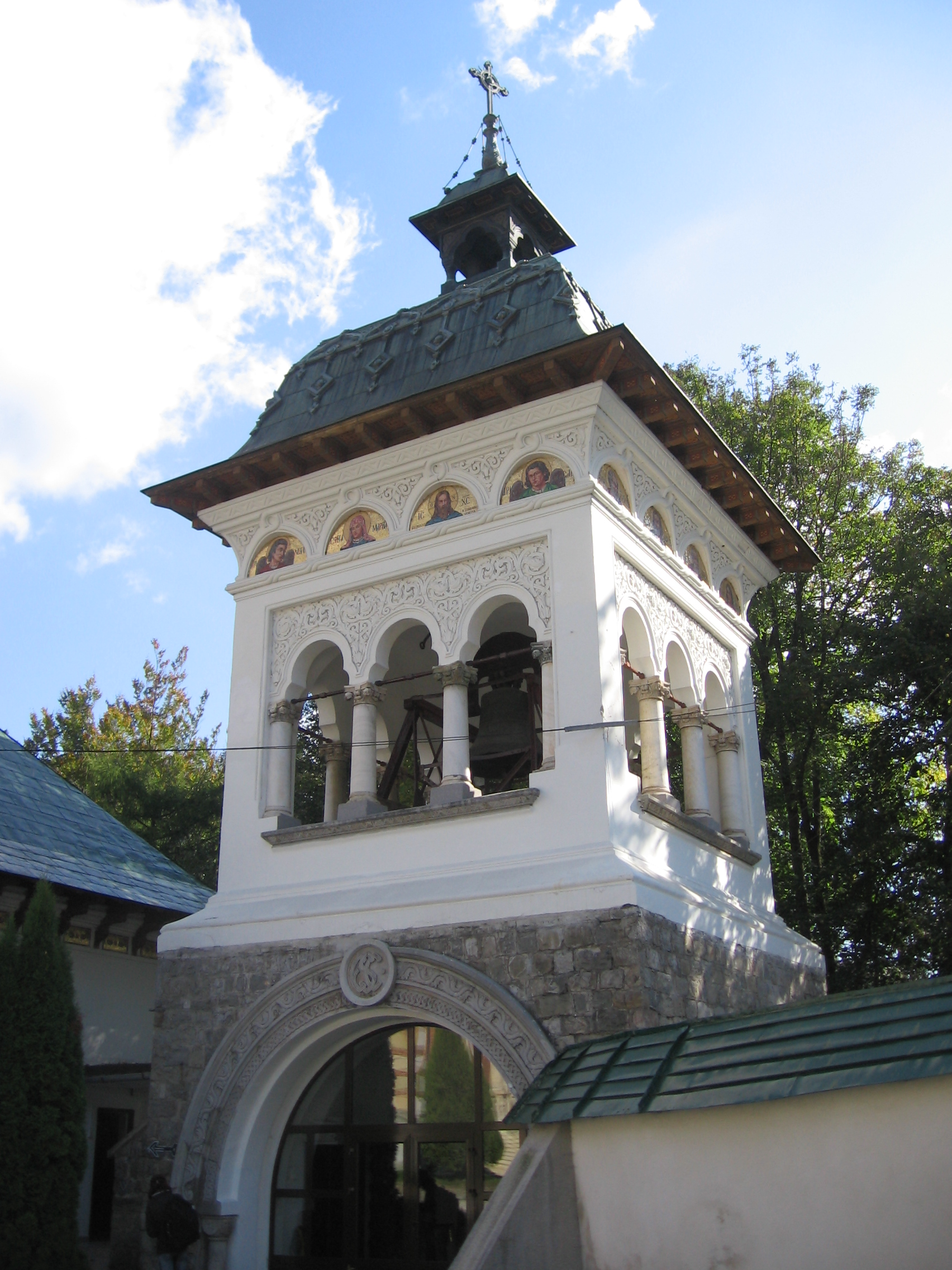
The Bell Tower as seen from within the walls

During the leadership of Hegumen Nifon Popescu (1888–1909), a large bell tower was added to the monastery walls. It was completed in 1892. The 1,700-kilogram (3,700 lb) bell was brought from the Colțea Tower in Bucharest.

== The museum ==
In 1895 the museum of the monastery was opened, the first exhibition of religious objects in Romania. It holds collections of icons and crosses from the 17th century, the very first Bible in Romanian (Bucharest, 1688), and many other precious objects. The museum is open every day but Mondays, from April to October 10:00-16:00 and during winter time only for groups over 20. Fee: 5 lei (2 lei for students).

== Location ==
The monastery is nearby Peleş Castle and it can be reached by train as Sinaia railway station is just 'downstairs' from the monastery. It is also accessible by road.

== See also ==
- Eastern Orthodox Church

== Gallery ==
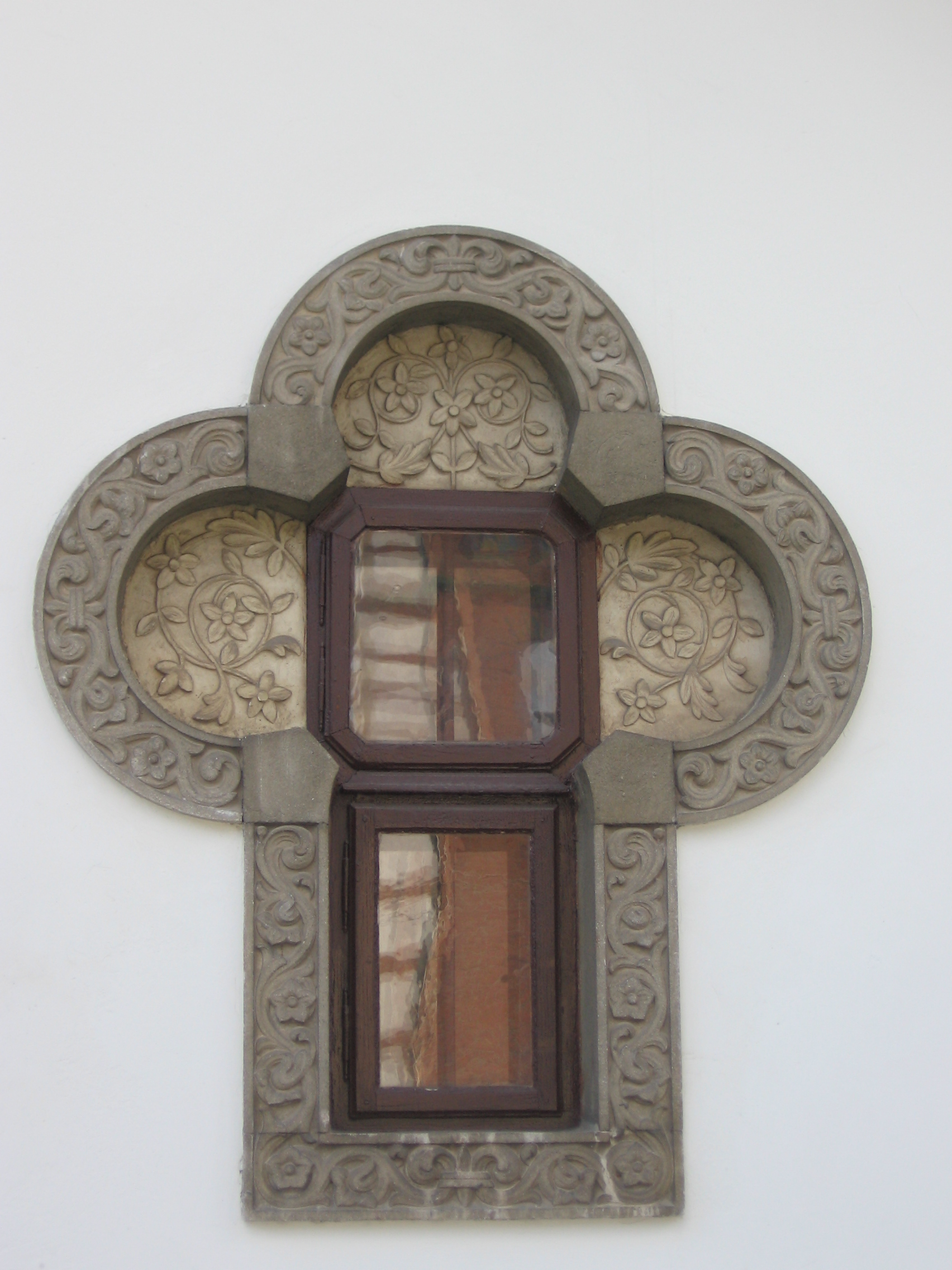
Ornament of the monastery windows

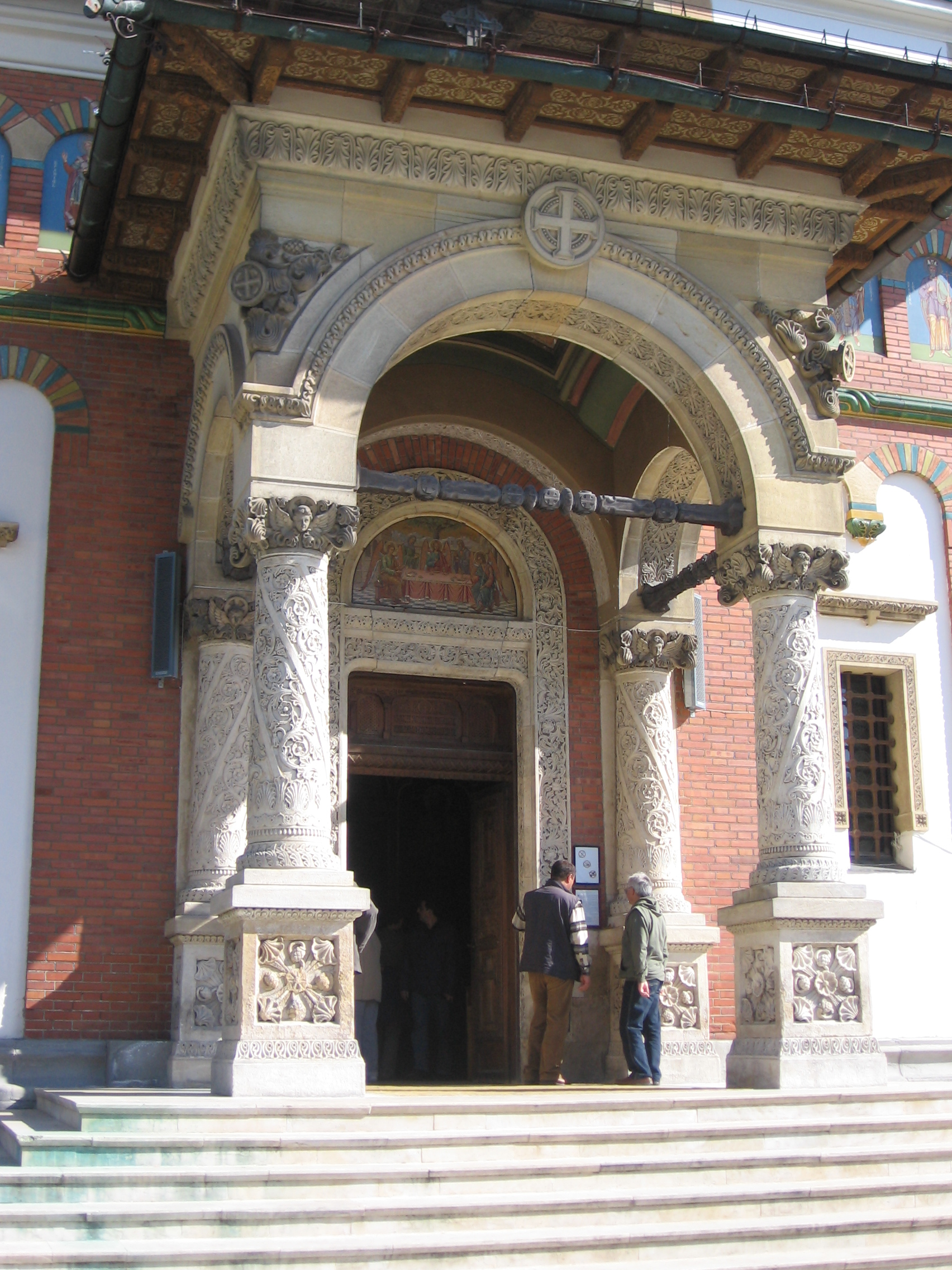
The Entrance to the Great Church

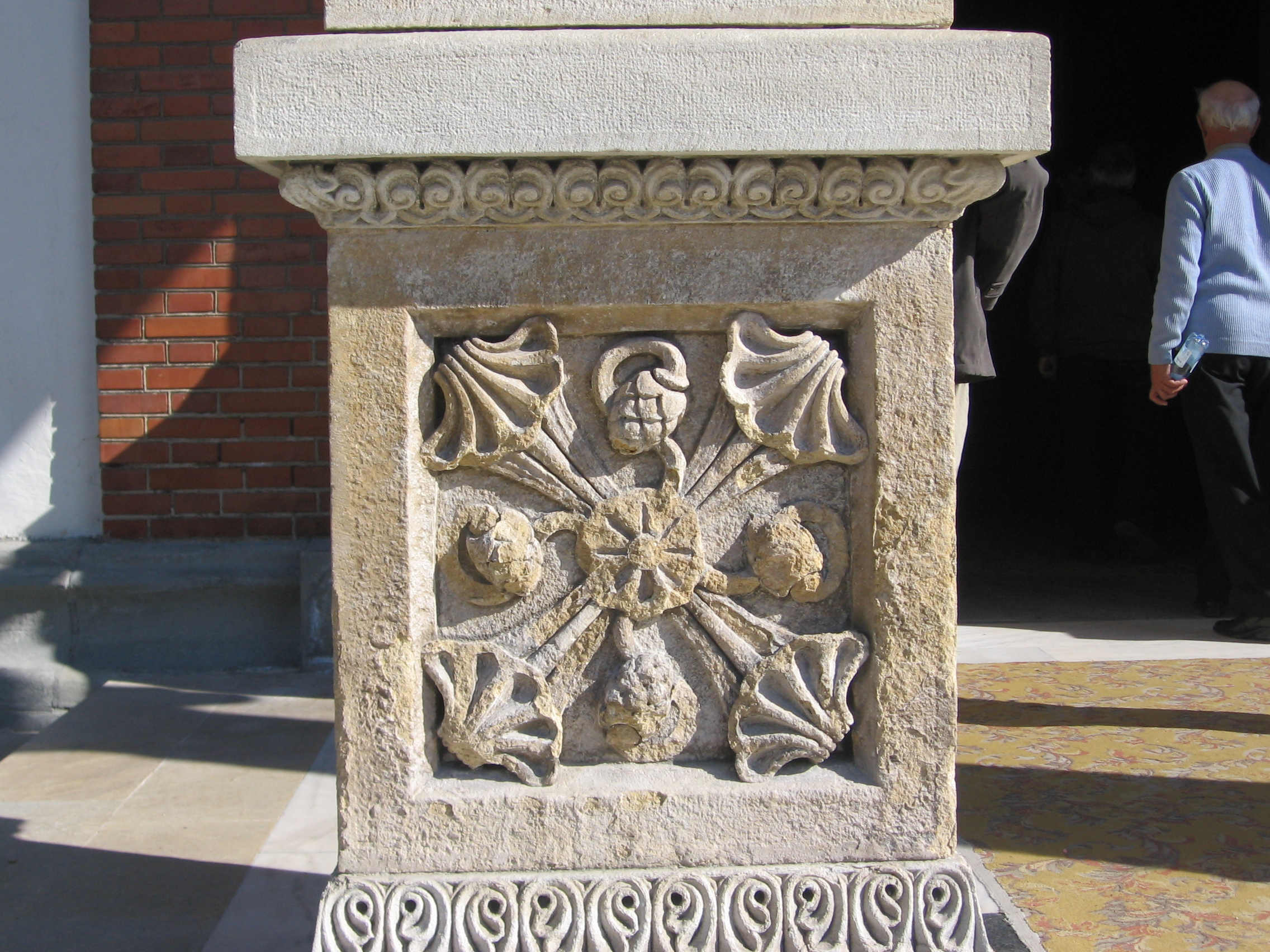
Details of the pillars at the entrance of the Great Church

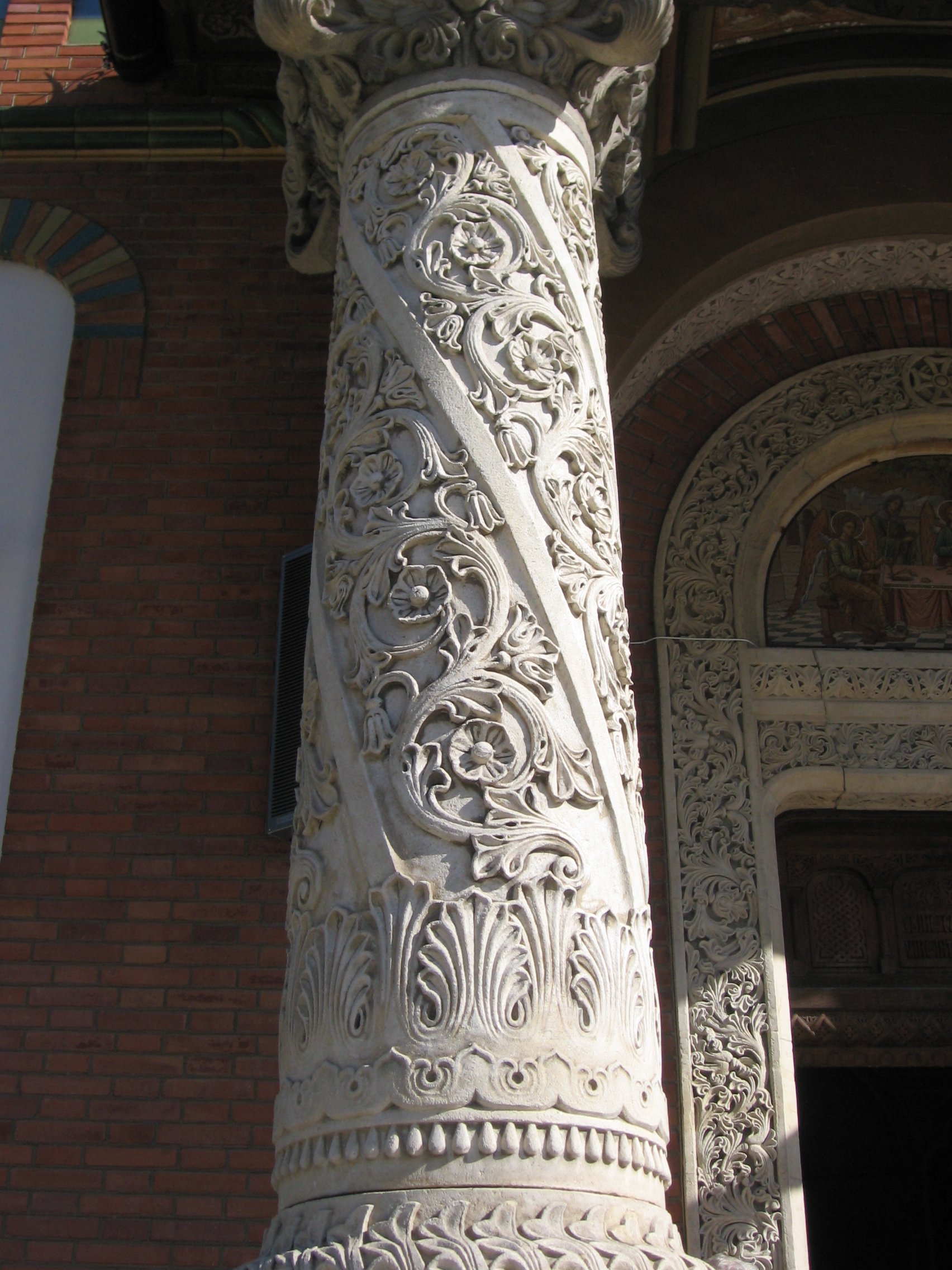
Details of the pillars at the entrance of the Great Church

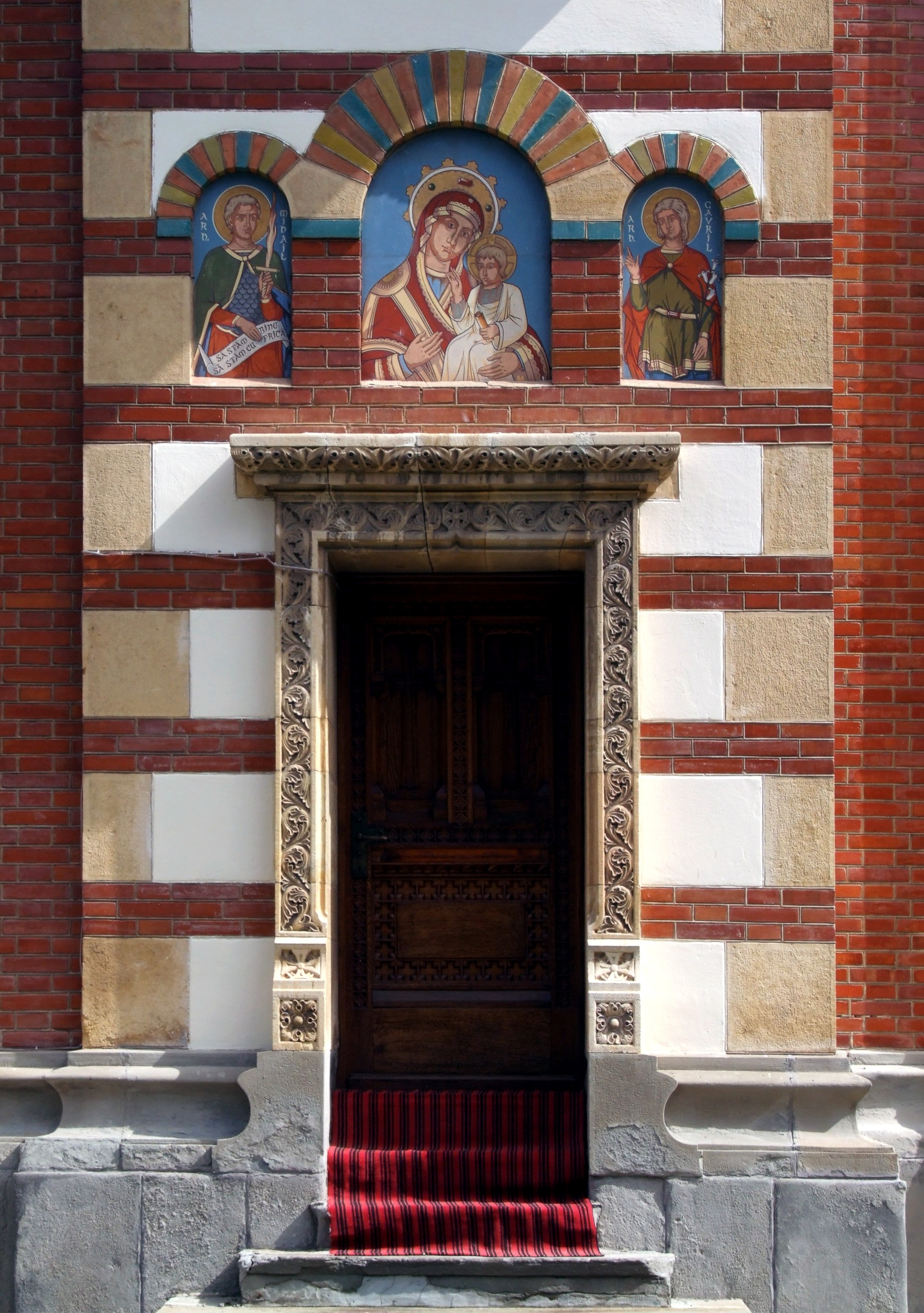
The Back Entrance to the Great Church

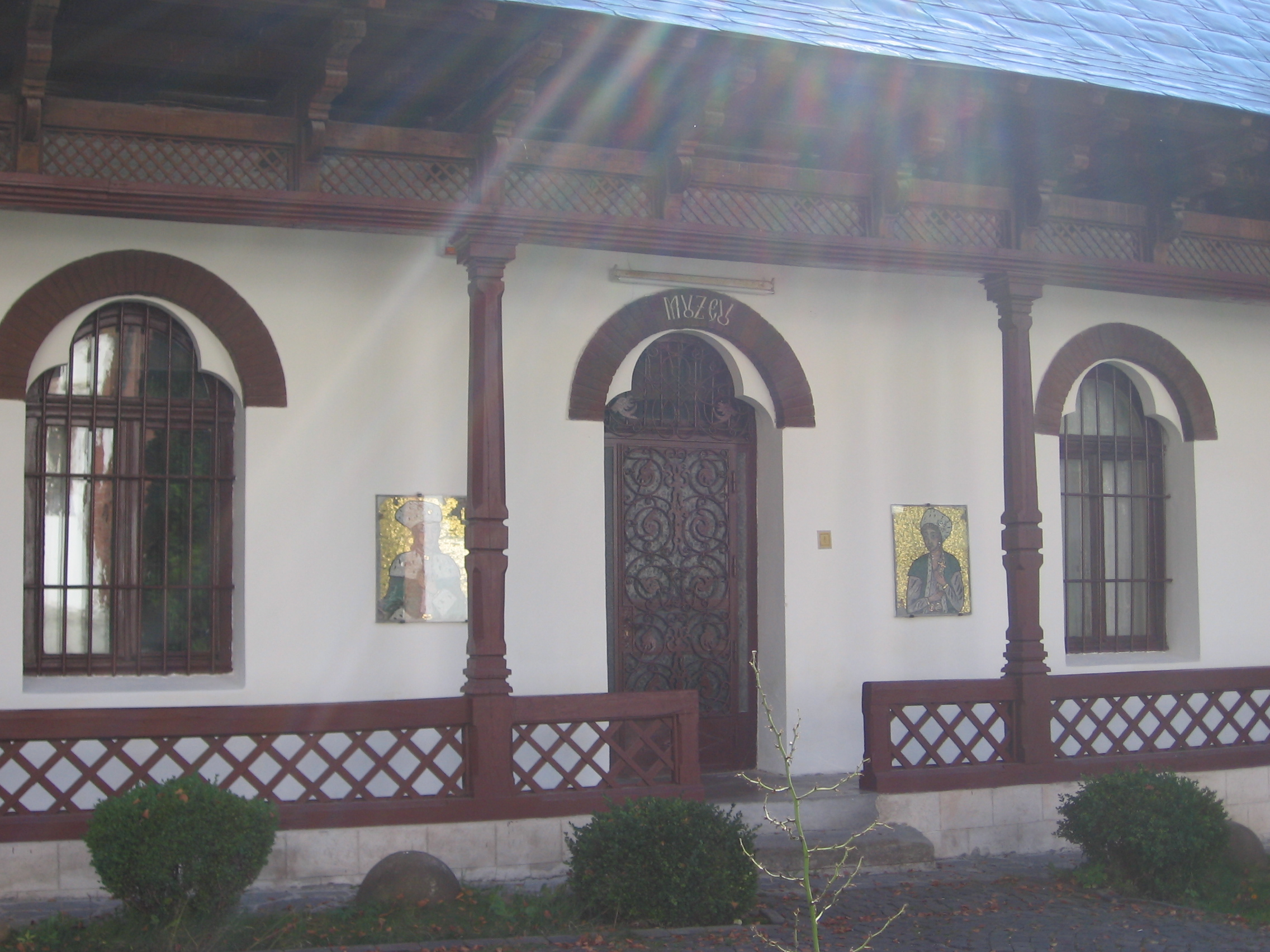
The Museum

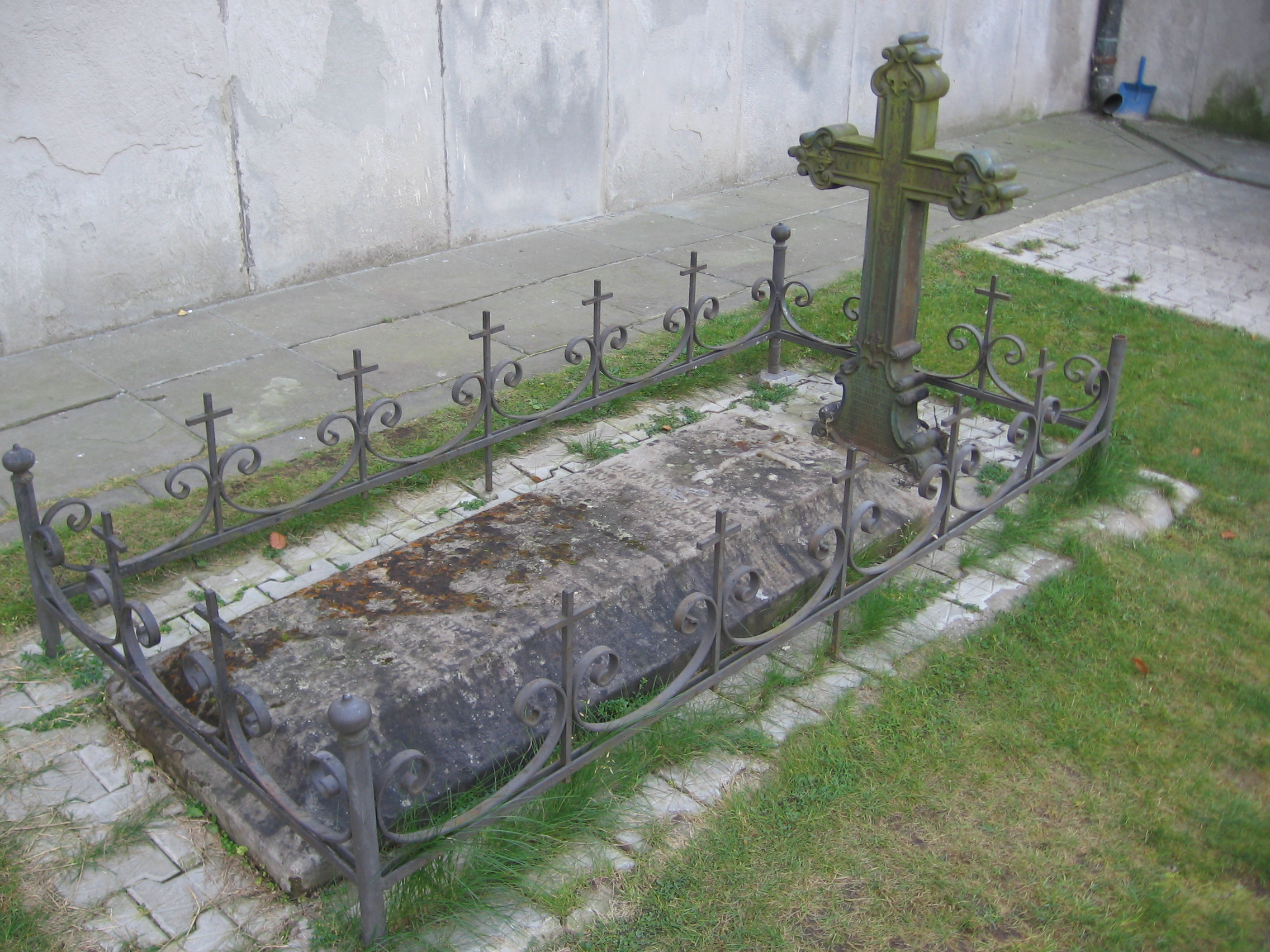
A grave next to the Great Church

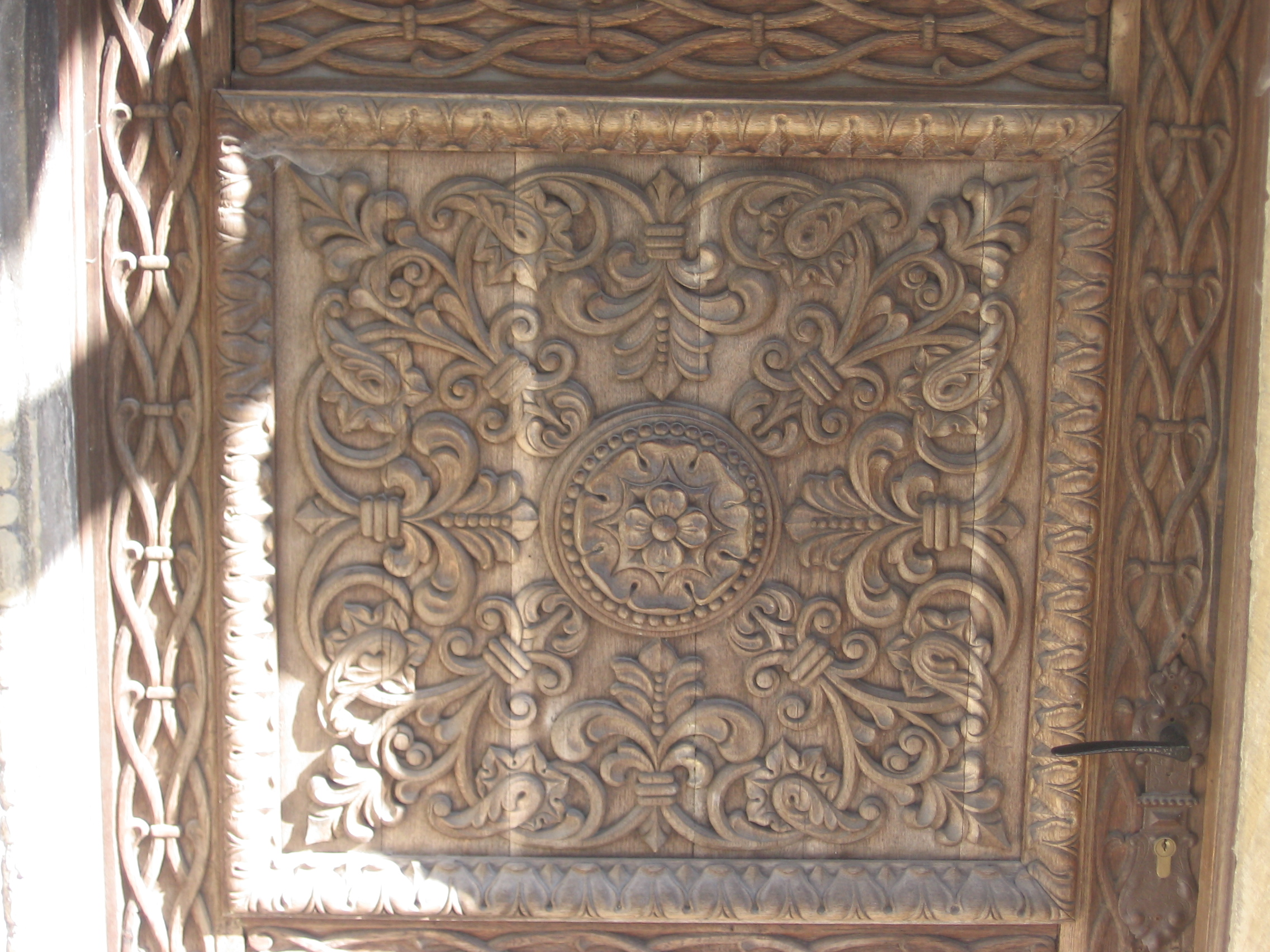
Detail of the entrance door to the Old Church

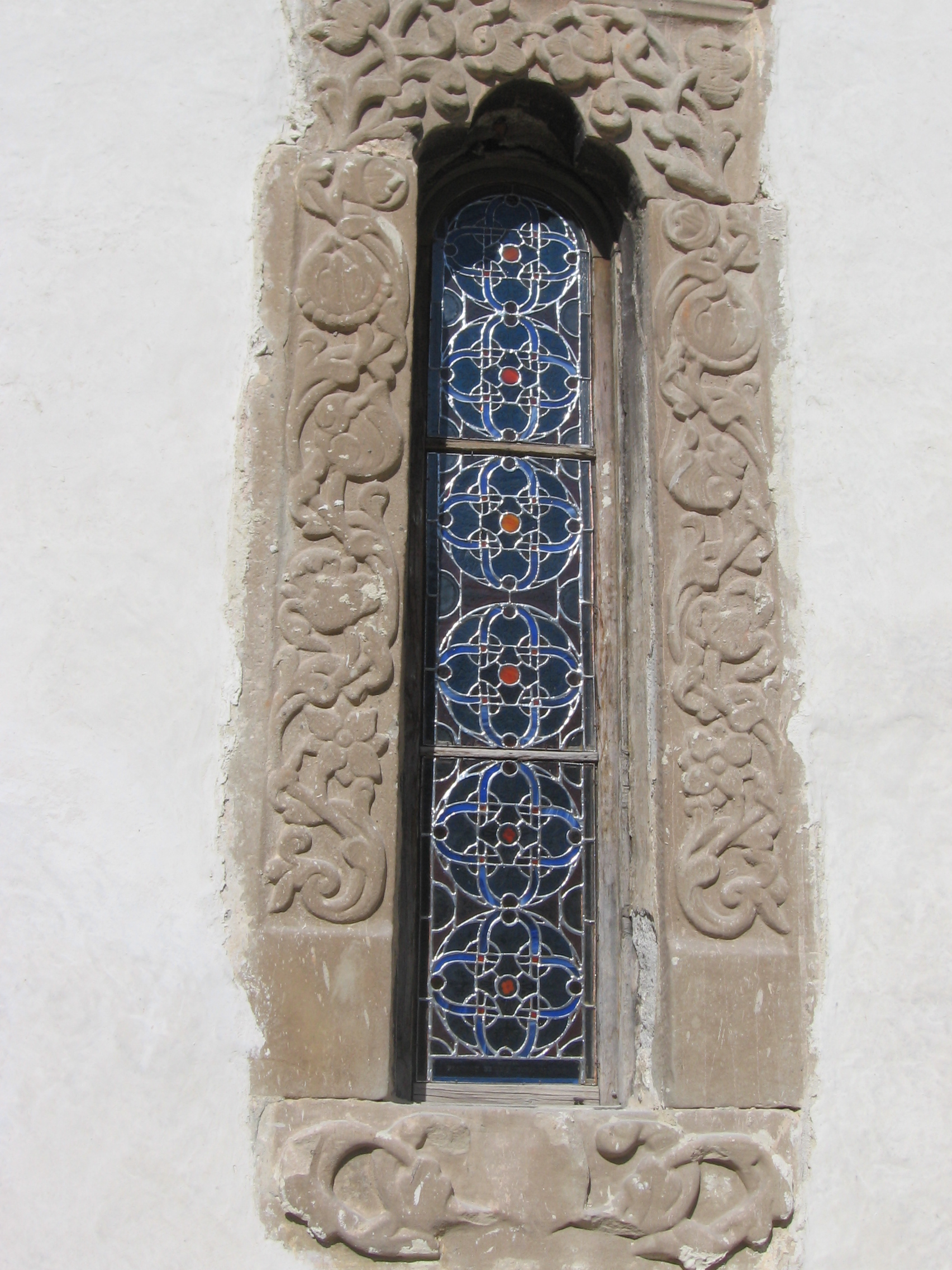
Window to the Old Church
