= Sinaia Casino =

- Cazinoul Sinaia
- Casino Sinaia in 2017

- Location in Romania

General information
- Architectural style: Neo-Romanian
- Location: Sinaia, Romania
- Coordinates: 45°21′19″N 25°33′12″E
- Construction started: 1912
- Completed: 1913
- Opening: 1913
- Client: King Carol I of Romania

Design and construction
- Architect: Petre Antonescu
- Main contractor: Baron of Marçay

The Sinaia Casino (Romanian: Cazinoul Sinaia) is located in "Dimitrie Ghica" park, Sinaia, Romania and was built at the initiative of King Carol I of Romania.

Construction began in 1912 and was finished a year later. The work was supervised by architect Petre Antonescu, who was also the author of the plans. The main shareholder in the casino was Baron of Marçay, a shareholder in the Monte Carlo Casino. The opening was celebrated with fireworks and a piano recital by George Enescu, in the presence of Alexandru Davila and Titu Maiorescu. The casino became a major attraction between the wars.

After the communist takeover in the late 1940s, gambling ceased and the casino is now an international conference center.
