= Prahova Valley =

Valley in Romania

Coordinates: 44°42′55″N 26°28′14″E

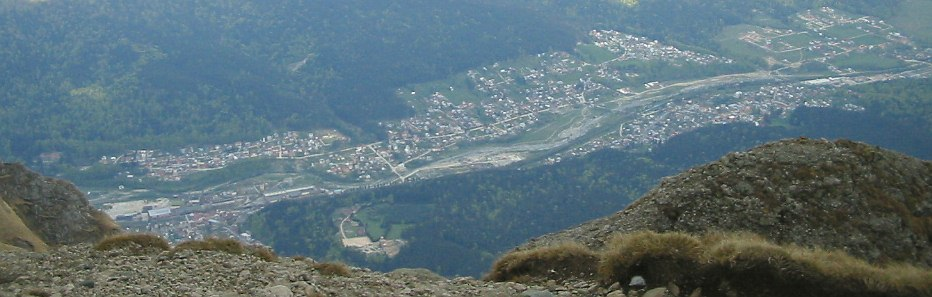
Prahova Valley, as seen from the Caraiman Mountain

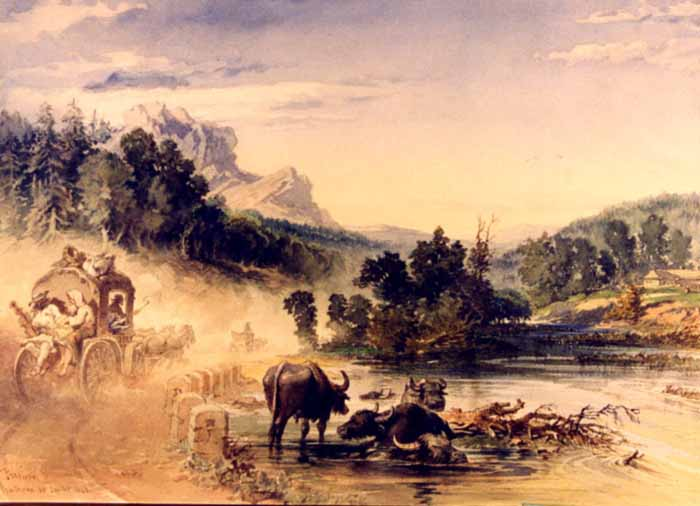
Prahova Valley, in an aquarelle by Amedeo Preziosi

Prahova Valley (Romanian: Valea Prahovei) is the valley where the Prahova river makes its way between the Bucegi and the Baiu Mountains, in the Carpathian Mountains, Romania. It is a tourist region, situated about 100 km (62 mi) north of the capital city of Bucharest.

== World War I ==
During World War I, the area was the site of heavy fighting between Austro-Hungarian and German forces on one side and Romanian forces on the other. The strategic objective of the Central Powers was to reach Bucharest via the shortest route, but they were prevented from doing so by determined Romanian resistance.

== Geography ==
Geographically, the Prahova river separates the Eastern Carpathians chain from the Southern Carpathians. Historically, the corridor was the most important passageway between the principalities of Wallachia and Transylvania. The DN1 road links Bucharest with the city of Brașov; the planned A3 freeway is currently being built along the Prahova Valley.

The region is a popular destination for mountaineers and for winter sports fans. The most important resorts are:

- Predeal
- Azuga
- Bușteni
- Sinaia
- Comarnic
- Breaza

== See also ==
- Tourism in Romania
