= Pelișor Castle =

Castle in Sinaia, Romania

Pelișor Castle Castelul Pelișor
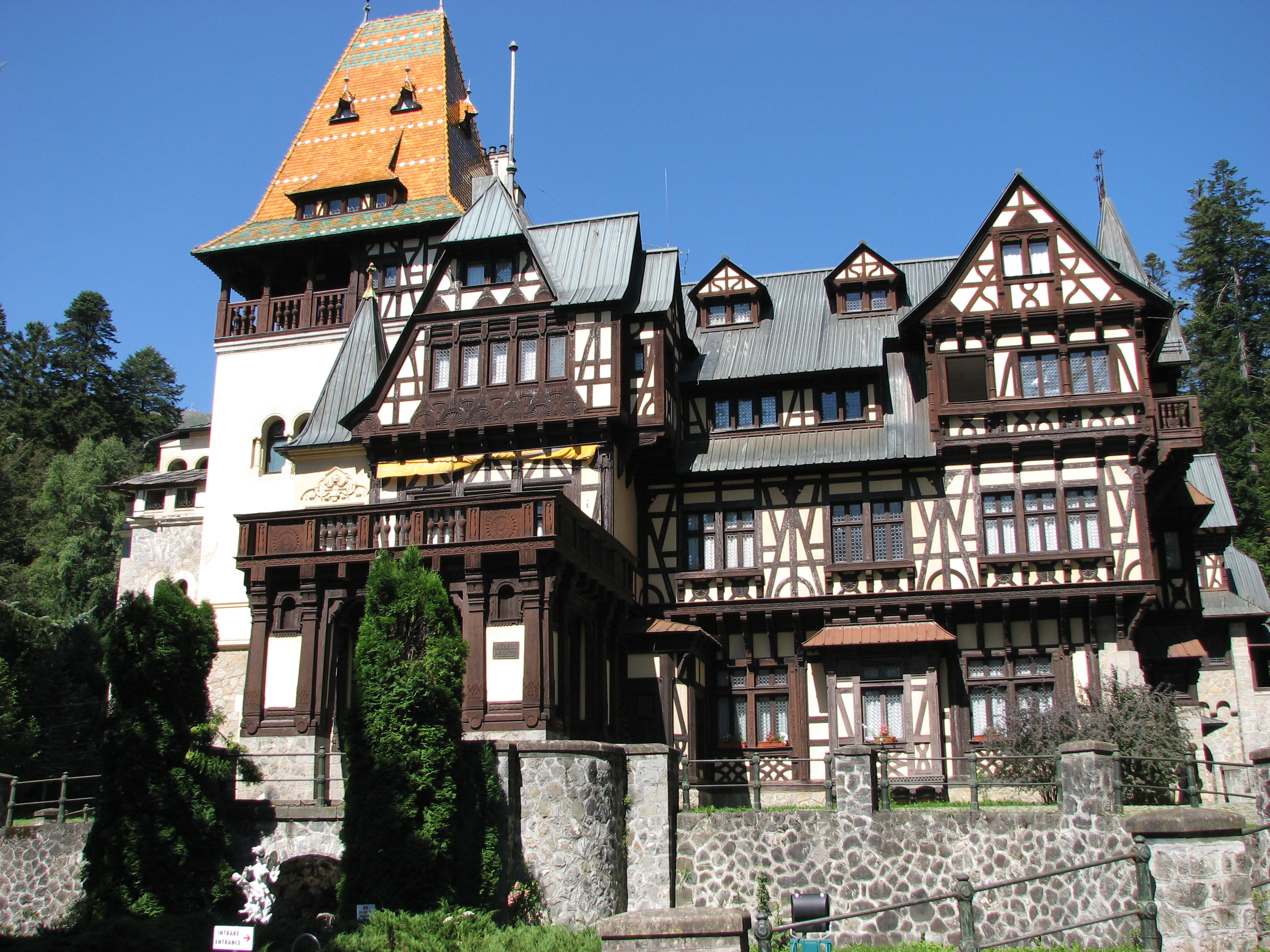
- Side view
- Interactive map of the Pelișor Castle; Castelul Pelișor area

General information
- Location: Sinaia, Romania
- Coordinates: 45°21′38″N 25°32′21″E
- Construction started: 1899
- Completed: 1903
- Client: King Carol I of Romania for the future King Ferdinand I of Romania
- Owner: Romanian Royal Family

Technical details
- Size: Art Nouveau (Byzantine and Celtic)

Design and construction
- Architect: Karel Liman

The Pelișor Castle (Romanian: Castelul Pelișor, pronunciation: [peliˈʃor]) is a castle in Sinaia, Romania, part of the same complex as the larger castle of Peleș.

== History ==
The castle was built in 1899–1902 by order of King Carol I, as the residence for his nephew and heir, the future King Ferdinand (son of Carol's brother Leopold von Hohenzollern) and Ferdinand's consort Queen Marie.

In 2006, it was decided that the entire complex, including Pelișor, long a museum and tourist site, is the legal property of the King Michael I of Romania. The royal family was to assume legal possession of it and lease it to the Romanian state, so that it will remain in its current status. The main castle of Peleș is already under lease, but negotiations for other villas and chateaus are on going. King Michael I of Romania maintained that Pelișor would remain a private residence for the royal family.

== Architecture ==
Pelișor was designed by the Czech architect Karel Liman in the Art Nouveau style; the furniture and the interior decorations were designed mostly by the Viennese Bernhard Ludwig. There are several chambers, working cabinets, a chapel, and "the golden room". Queen Marie, herself an accomplished artist, made many of the artistic decisions about the design of the palace, and participated in its decoration, including as a painter. Queen Marie considered Art Nouveau a weapon against sterile historicism, creating a personal style combining Art-Nouveau elements with Byzantine and Celtic elements.

The hall of honour is very simple with the walls covered with oak-timber and a glass ceiling.

== Museum ==
Opening hours at Pelișor Castle:

- Summer (15 May – 15 September): Monday closed, Closed, Wednesday – Sunday 09.00–17.00
- Winter (16 September – 14 May): Monday, Tuesday – closed, Wednesday 11.15–16.15, Thursday – Sunday 09.15–16.15

In the period 15 October – 30 November the Castle is closed for works of preservation. Admission fee is 20 RON.

== See also ==
- Tourism in Romania
- List of castles in Romania
- Villages with fortified churches in Transylvania
