= Sinaia =

Town in Prahova, Romania

- Town
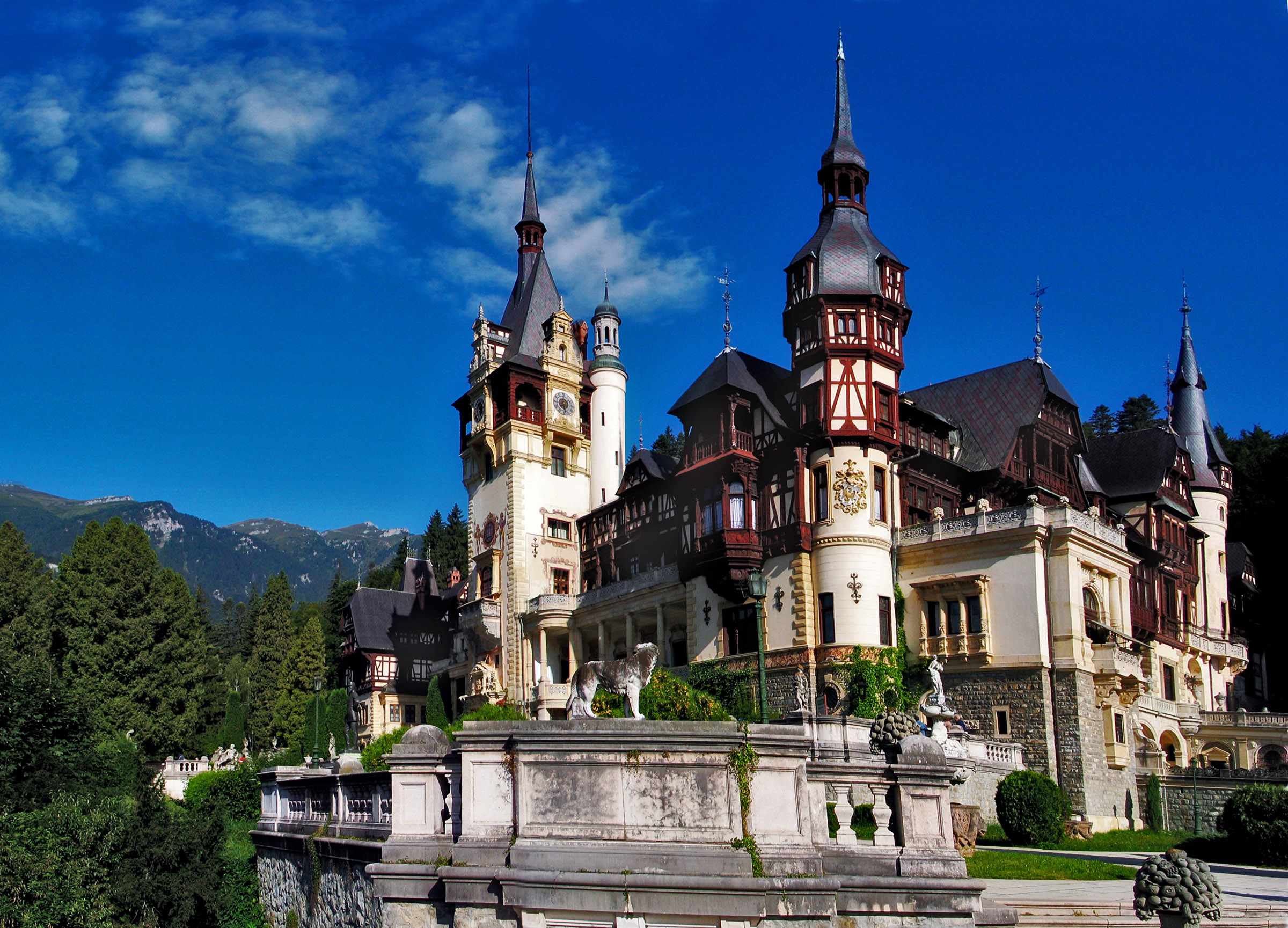
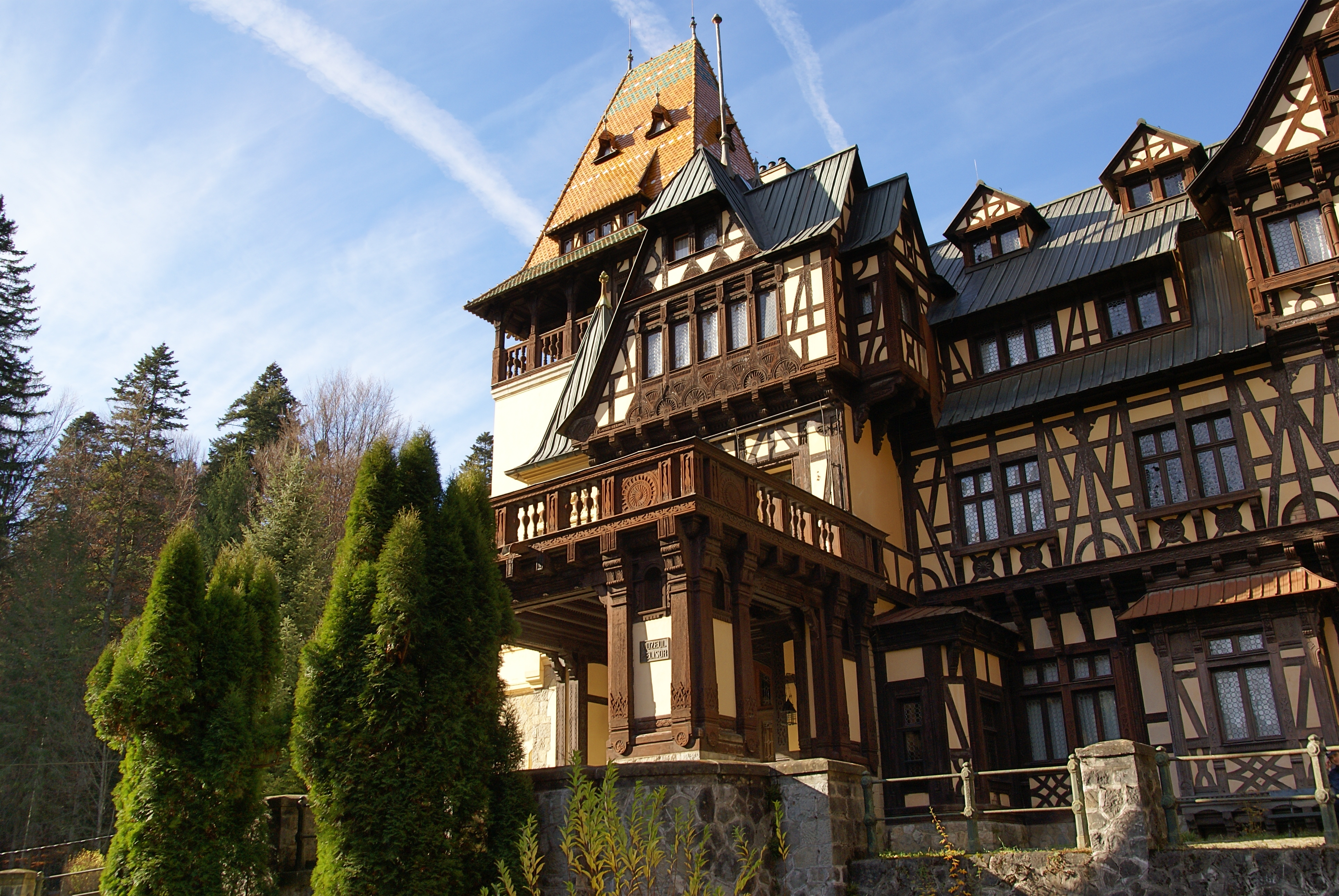
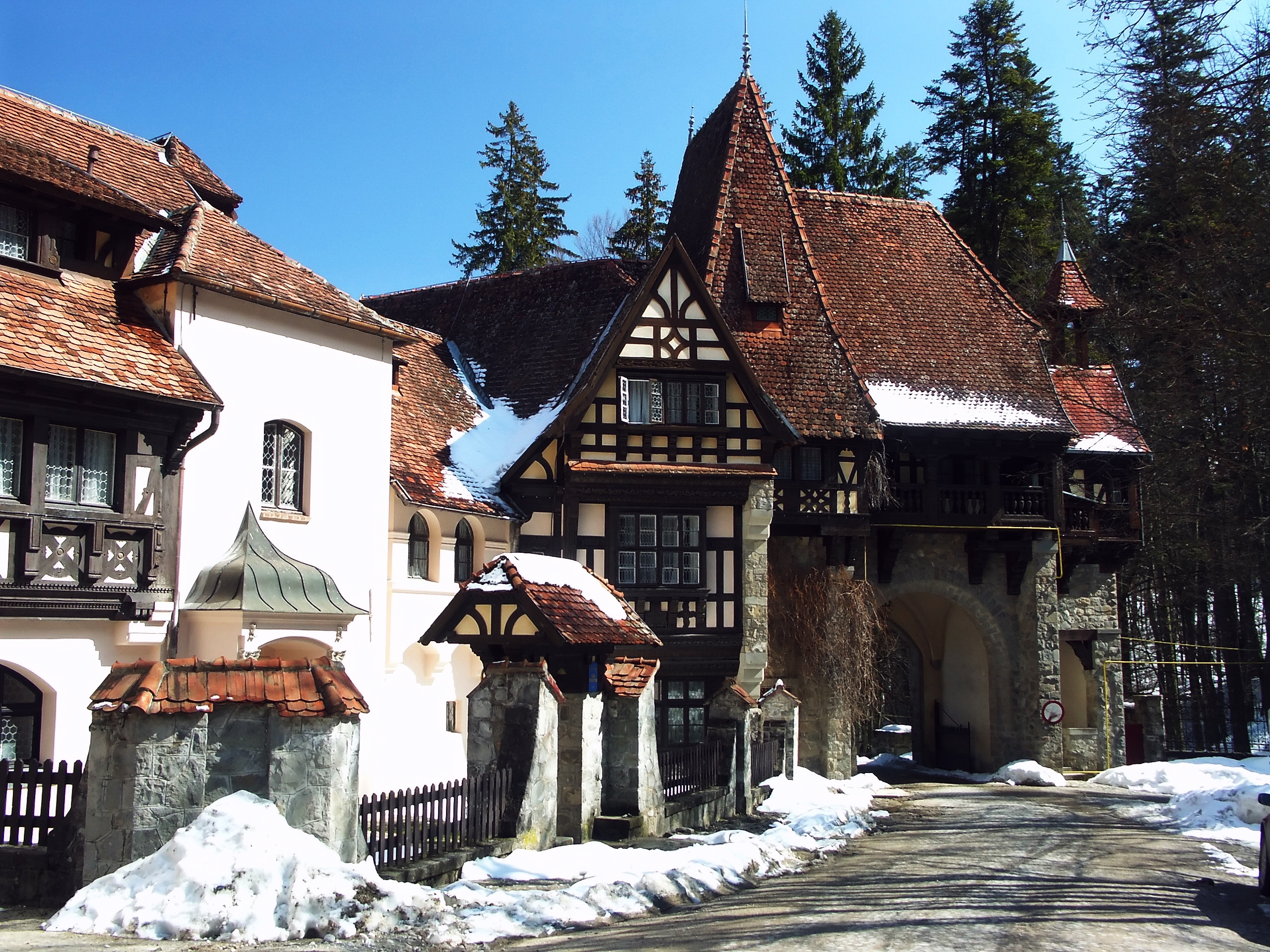
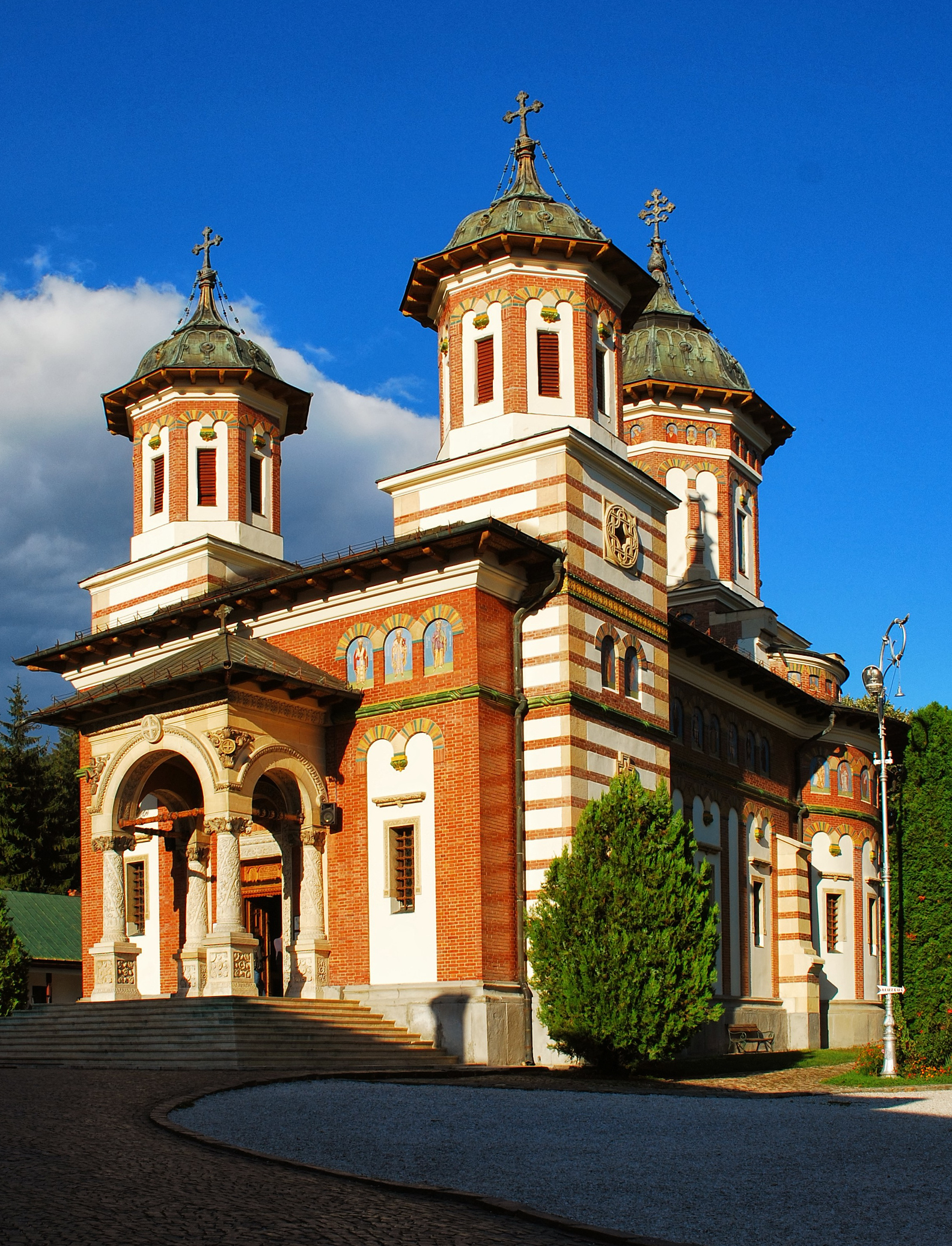
- From top, left to right: Peleș Castle; Pelișor Castle; Sinaia Monastery; Sinaia Casino

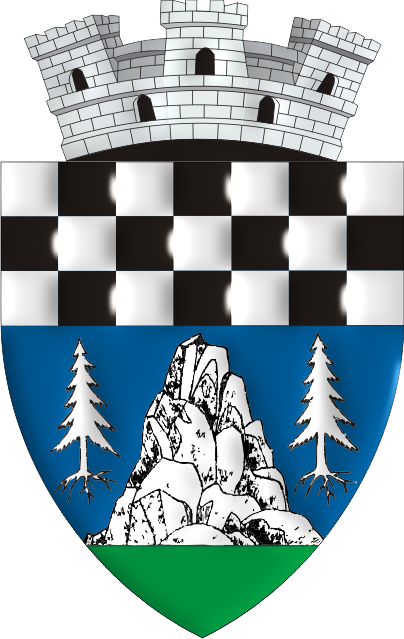
- Coat of arms

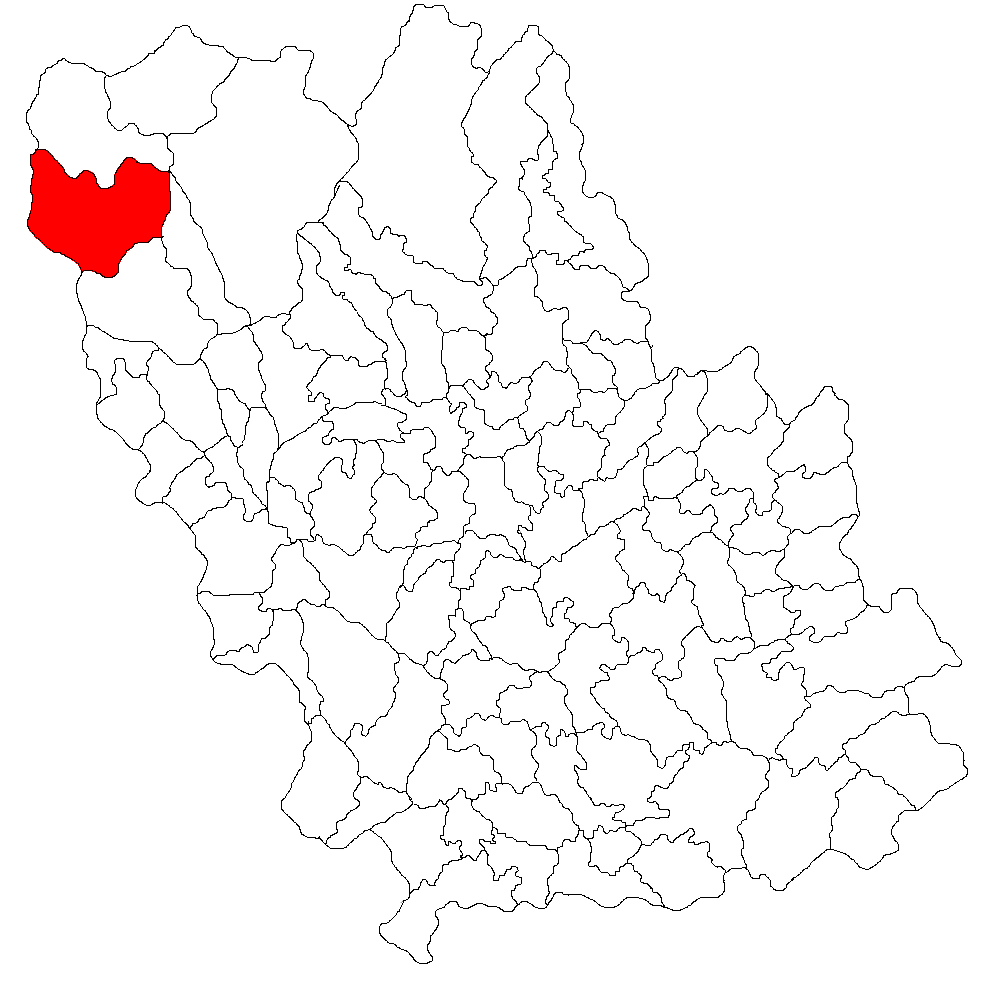
- Location in Prahova County

- Location in Romania
- Coordinates: 45°21′0″N 25°33′5″E
- Country: Romania
- County: Prahova

Government
  - Mayor (2024–2028): Vlad Gheorghe Oprea (PNL)
- Area: 89.27 km^{2} (34.47 sq mi)
- Population (2021-12-01): 9,071
  - Density: 101.6/km^{2} (263.2/sq mi)
- Time zone: UTC+02:00 (EET)
  - Summer (DST): UTC+03:00 (EEST)
- Vehicle reg.: PH
- Website: www.primaria-sinaia.ro

Sinaia (Romanian pronunciation: [siˈnaja]) is a town and a mountain resort in Prahova County, Romania. It is situated in the historical region of Muntenia. The town was named after the Sinaia Monastery of 1695, around which it was built. The monastery, in turn, is named after the Biblical Mount Sinai. King Carol I of Romania also built his summer residence, Peleș Castle, in Sinaia in the late nineteenth century.

Sinaia is about 65 kilometres (40 miles) northwest of Ploiești and 48 kilometres (30 miles) south of Brașov, in a mountainous area on the Prahova River valley, just east of the Bucegi Mountains. The town's altitude varies between 767 to 860 metres (2,516 to 2,822 feet) above sea level.

The city is a popular destination for hiking and winter sports, especially downhill skiing. Among the tourist landmarks, the most important are Peleș Castle, Pelișor Castle, Sinaia Monastery, Sinaia Casino, Sinaia train station, and the Franz Joseph and Saint Anne Cliffs. Sinaia was also the summer residence of the Romanian composer George Enescu, who stayed at the Luminiș villa.

Historical population
Year	Pop.	±%
1912	3,919	—
1930	4,072	+3.9%
1948	6,537	+60.5%
1956	9,006	+37.8%
1966	11,976	+33.0%
1977	13,822	+15.4%
1992	15,465	+11.9%
2002	14,636	−5.4%
2011	10,410	−28.9%
2021	9,071	−12.9%
Source: Census data

== Climate ==
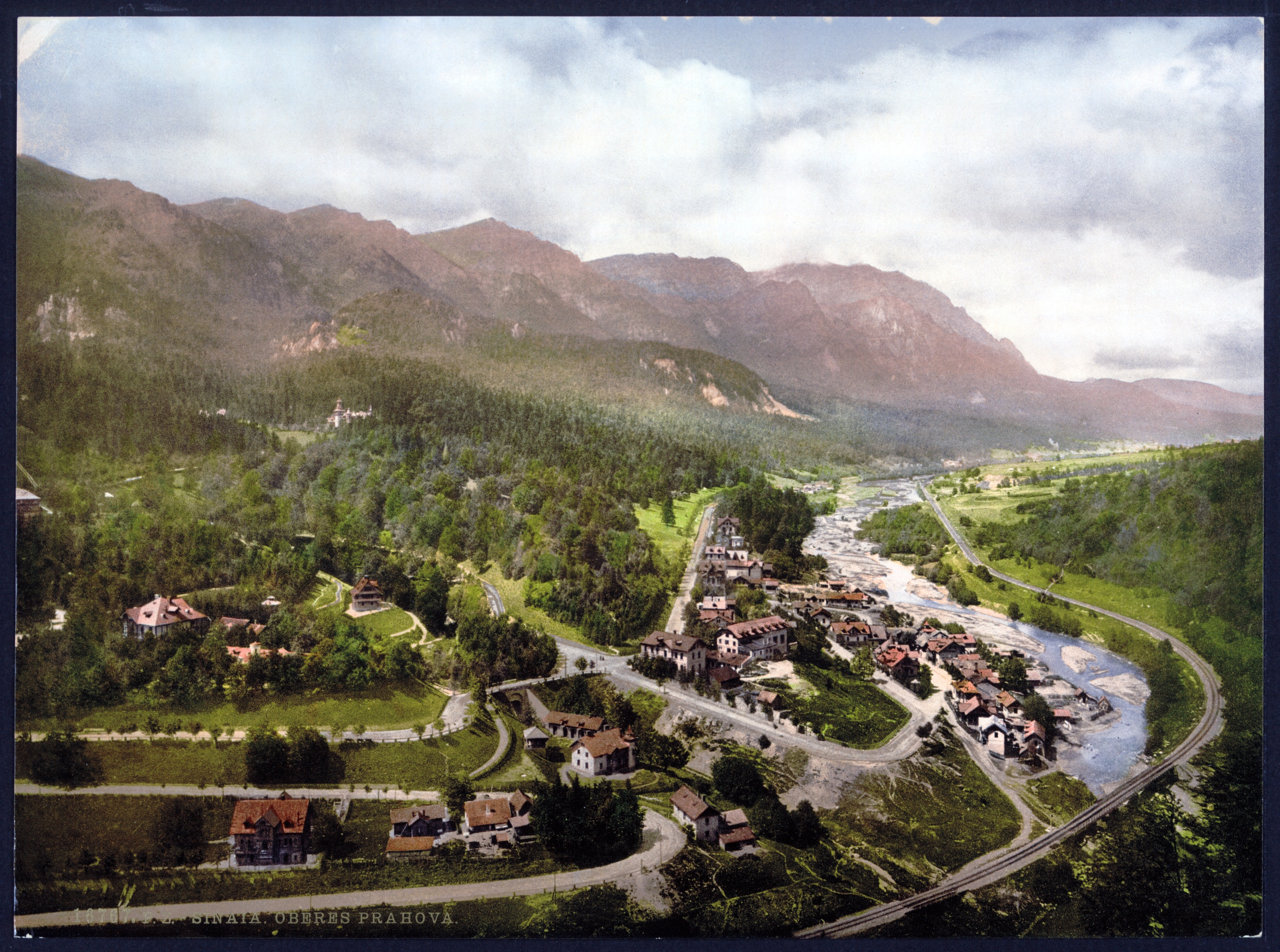
An 1890s postcard image of Sinaia

Sinaia has a warm-summer humid continental climate (Dfb in the Köppen climate classification).

Summers are bracing and very rainy at the beginning of the season. Winters are moderately cold, with heavy snow.

A uniform layer of snow is deposited usually in November and it melts from March to April, sometimes at the beginning of May. The thickness of the snow layer varies between 20 centimeters (7.9 in) and 3 meters (9.8 ft) in higher elevations.

In recent years, Sinaia has felt the effects of global climate change.

Climate data for Sinaia
Month	Jan	Feb	Mar	Apr	May	Jun	Jul	Aug	Sep	Oct	Nov	Dec	Year
Mean daily maximum °C (°F)	−1 (30)	0.7 (33.3)	4.5 (40.1)	10.2 (50.4)	15 (59)	18.4 (65.1)	20.4 (68.7)	20.5 (68.9)	15.9 (60.6)	10.9 (51.6)	5.9 (42.6)	0.9 (33.6)	10.2 (50.3)
Daily mean °C (°F)	−4.8 (23.4)	−3.4 (25.9)	0.2 (32.4)	5.7 (42.3)	10.8 (51.4)	14.4 (57.9)	16.3 (61.3)	16.3 (61.3)	11.7 (53.1)	6.7 (44.1)	2.3 (36.1)	−2.9 (26.8)	6.1 (43.0)
Mean daily minimum °C (°F)	−8.3 (17.1)	−7.1 (19.2)	−4 (25)	0.9 (33.6)	6 (43)	9.7 (49.5)	11.7 (53.1)	11.9 (53.4)	7.7 (45.9)	3 (37)	−0.7 (30.7)	−6 (21)	2.1 (35.7)
Average precipitation mm (inches)	45 (1.8)	44 (1.7)	61 (2.4)	93 (3.7)	140 (5.5)	148 (5.8)	139 (5.5)	108 (4.3)	73 (2.9)	62 (2.4)	54 (2.1)	53 (2.1)	1,020 (40.2)
Source: https://en.climate-data.org/europe/romania/prahova/sinaia-12799/

== Nature preservation ==
In the town of Sinaia and its surroundings restrictions are in place regarding cutting down or picking flora. The felling of trees is not allowed. It is forbidden to pick any alpine plants. Severe punishments are enforced for anyone who gathers : the Mountain Peony (Rhododendron Kotsky), Edelweiss (Leontopodium alpinum), and the Yellow Gentiana (Gentiana lutea). Tourist camping is only authorized in designated places, following necessary and compulsory protection standards.

The mountainous area in which Sinaia is located is in the Bucegi Natural Park region. The Park covers a total area of 326.63 square kilometres (126.11 sq mi), of which 58.05 km^{2} (22.41 sq mi) are under strict protection and contain natural monuments. The Bucegi Natural Preserve area includes all the most precipitous areas of the mountains Vârful cu Dor, Furnica, and Piatra Arsă. The mountainous area is continuously patrolled by mountain rescue patrols as well as by members of the Mountain Police.

At the entrance to the Cumpătu district, one can find the “Sinaia alder-tree grove” botanical reservation placed under the protection of the Romanian Academy and the Bucharest Biology Institute. In the same district, there is also another ecological research station under the patronage of UNESCO – Jacques-Yves Cousteau, belonging to the University of Bucharest, which also includes a museum of Bucegi Mountains fauna.

== Tourist attractions ==
- Peleș Castle
- Pelișor Castle
- Sinaia Monastery
- Sinaia Casino International Conference Center
- Carmen Sylva Cultural Center
- George Enescu Memorial House
- Dimitrie Ghica park and the Bucegi Reserve Museum
- Heroes Cemetery
- Eagles of Freedom Plaza
- Franz Joseph and Saint Anne Cliffs
- Old electrical power plant
- Sinaia railway station
- Many other old villas
- Bucegi Mountains with a cable car connecting the resort with Cota 1,400 and Cota 2,000
- Baiu Mountains
- 16 ski slopes
- 4 mountain-bike trails

== Sinaia Forever Festival ==
Sinaia Forever, or the Autumn Festival, is one of the main festivals that takes place in Sinaia. The goal of the festival is to recreate the atmosphere of the 1940s while bringing in modern performers. The festival once took place during the last weekend of September, but was just recently changed to the first weekend of the month. During the festival, the downtown area of Sinaia is closed off to motorized vehicles. It becomes full of people, food stands, and children's rides. The three-day festival consists of the opening parade, concerts from well known musical artists of Romania, and amusement rides.

== Eagles of Freedom Plaza ==
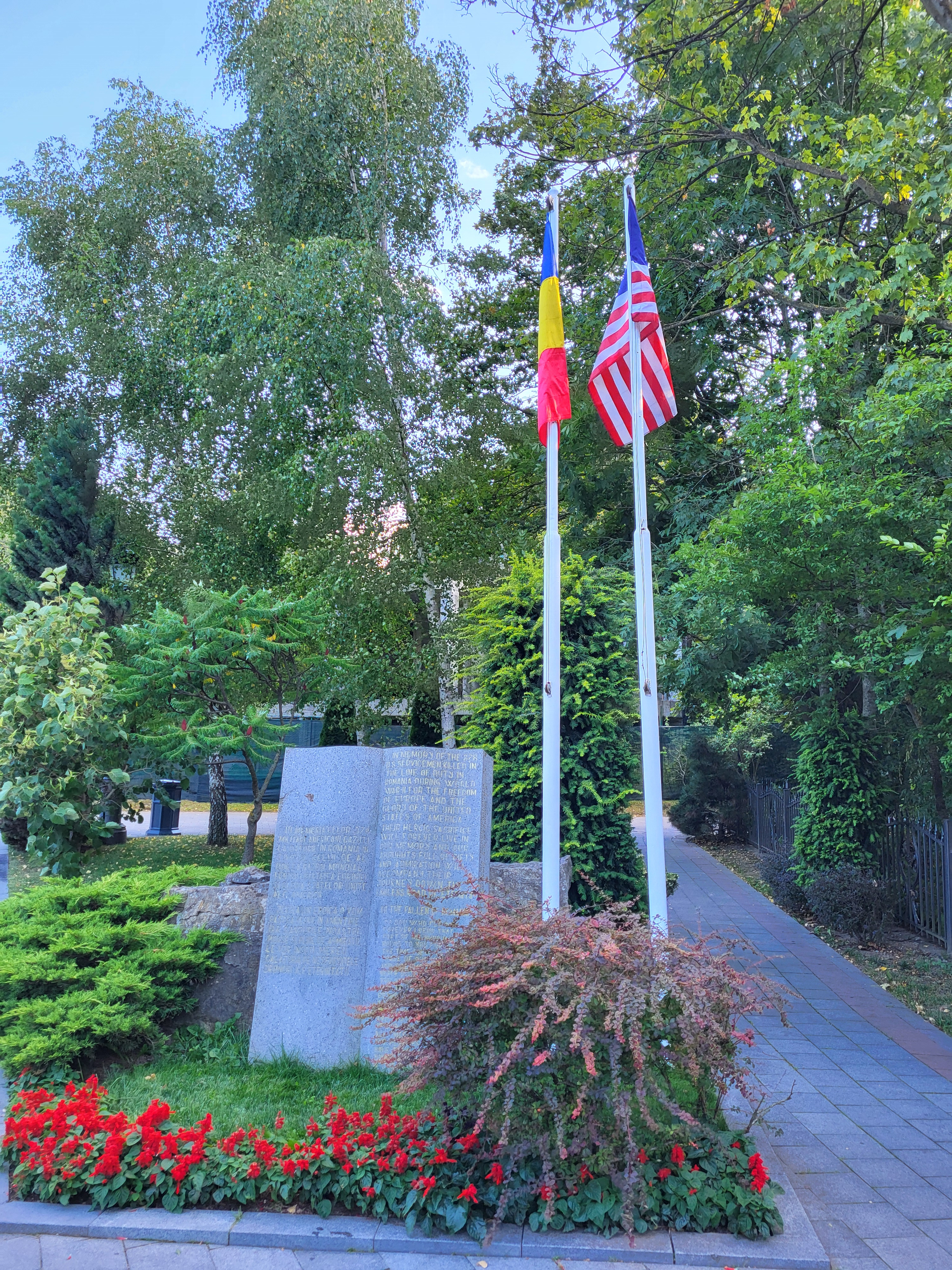

The Eagles of Freedom Plaza (Romanian: Piațeta „Vulturii Libertății”) is a square inaugurated in 2015, dedicated to honoring the memory of 378 American soldiers who lost their lives in Romania during World War II. At the heart of the plaza stands the Book of Americans, a marble monument inscribed with the names of these fallen soldiers. Originally created in 1999, the monument was previously located on the outskirts of the Heroes Cemetery but has since been relocated to this new, more prominent site. A commemorative plaque is also present, honoring the heroic sacrifice of the American soldiers and celebrating the historic bonds of friendship between the Romanian and American people. The inauguration of the plaza was attended by Sinaia's Mayor, Vlad Oprea, the United States Defense Attaché to Romania, Colonel Paul T. Matier, and the Dutch Ambassador to Bucharest, Mr. Matthijs van Bonzel.

== International relations ==
Sinaia is twinned with:

- Aosta, Italy
- Cetinje, Montenegro
- Hod HaSharon, Israel
- Cascais, Portugal
- Thame, United Kingdom
- Kuşadası, Turkey
- Athis-Mons, France

== Notable residents ==
- George Enescu
- Romanian Royal family
- Claudiu David

== Gallery ==
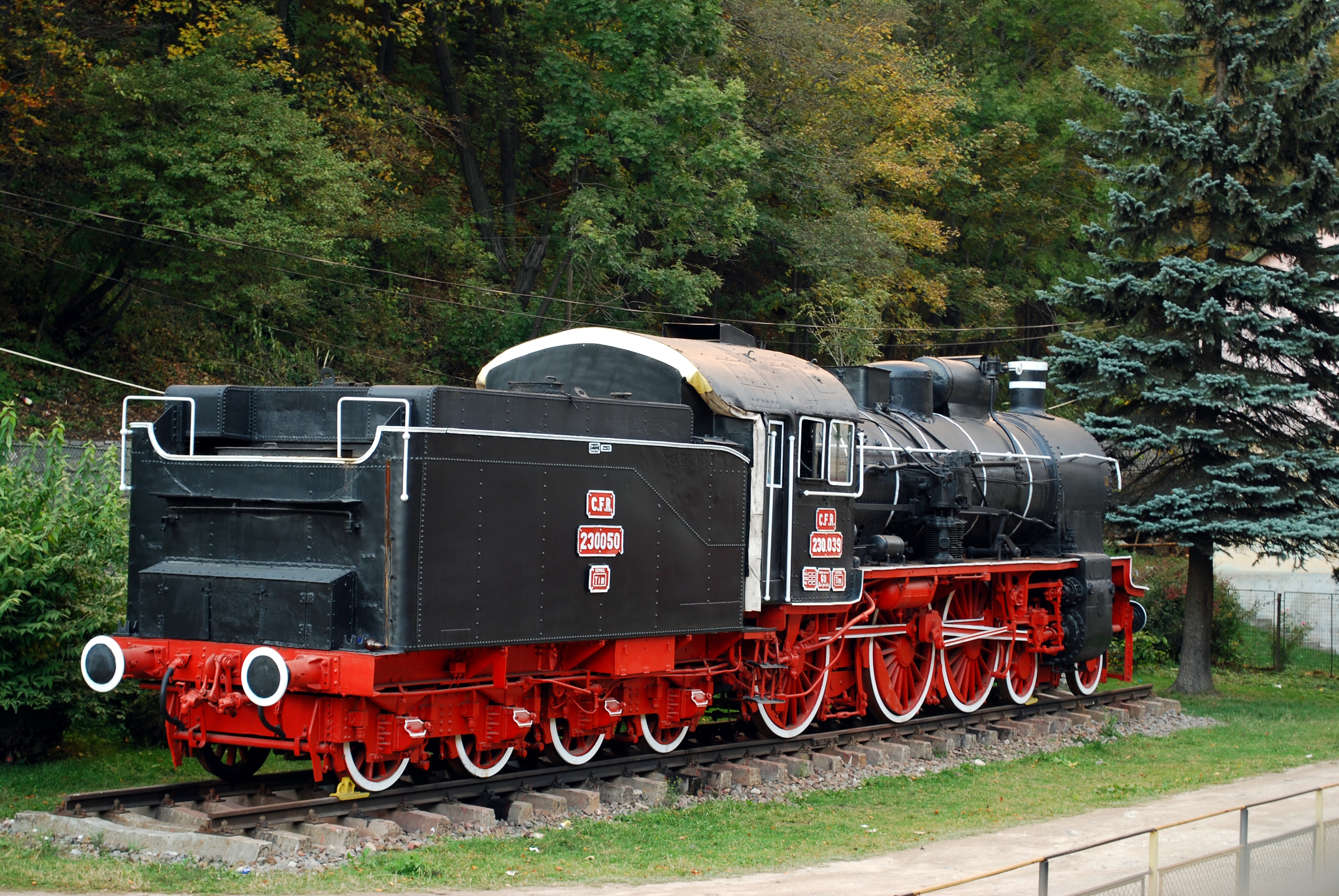
Steam engine in Sinaia

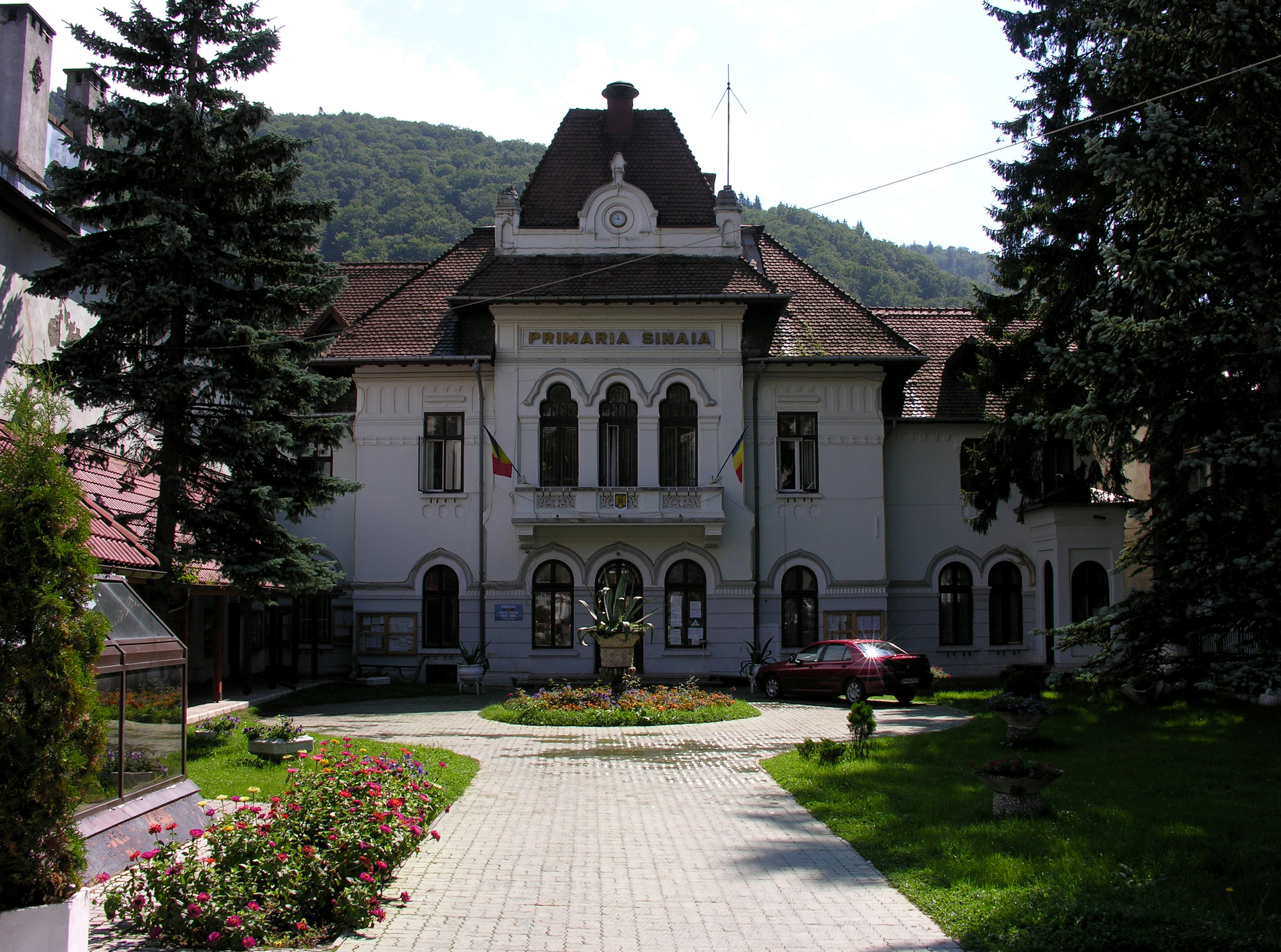
City Hall

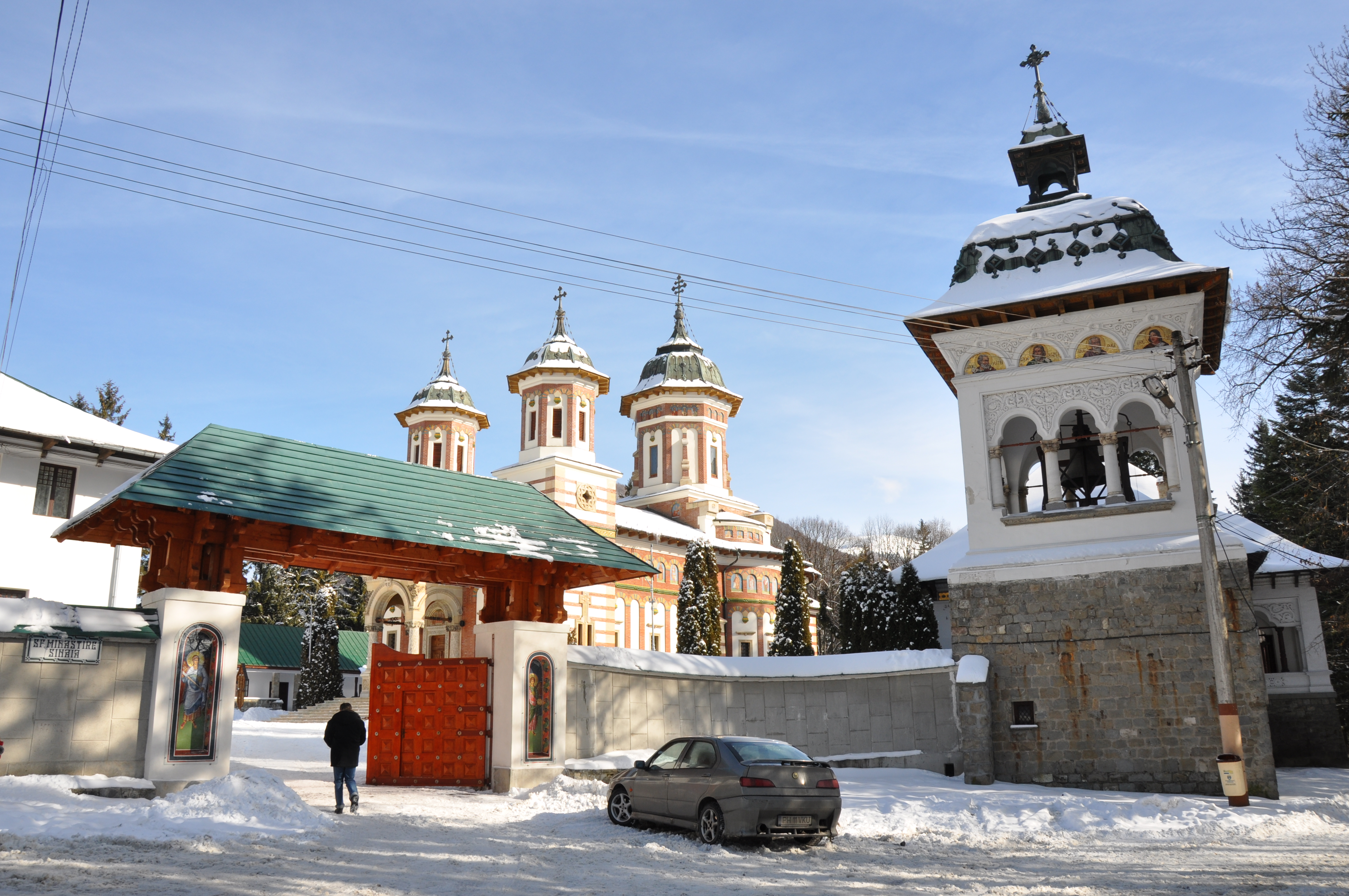
Sinaia Monastery

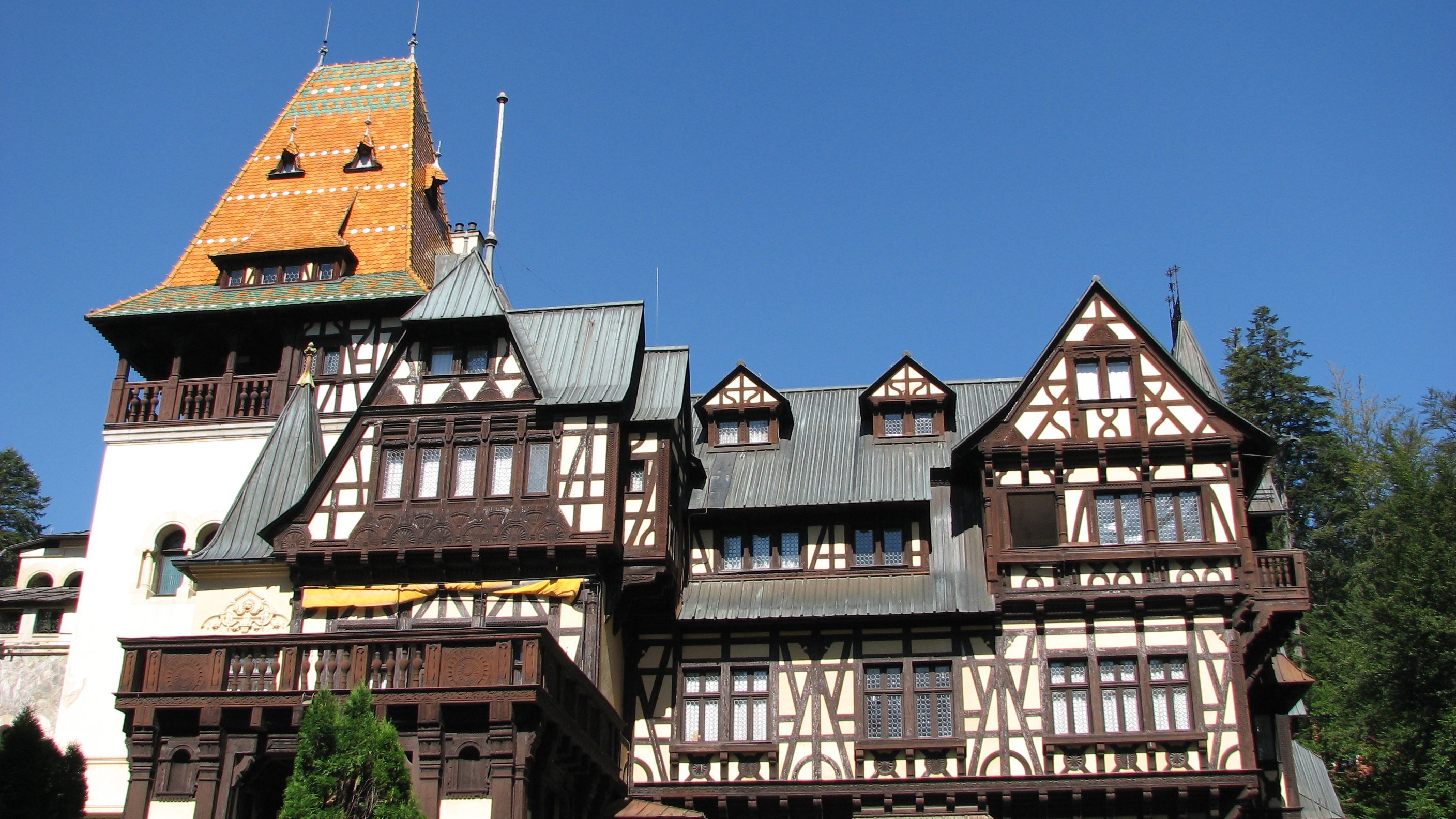
Pelișor Castle

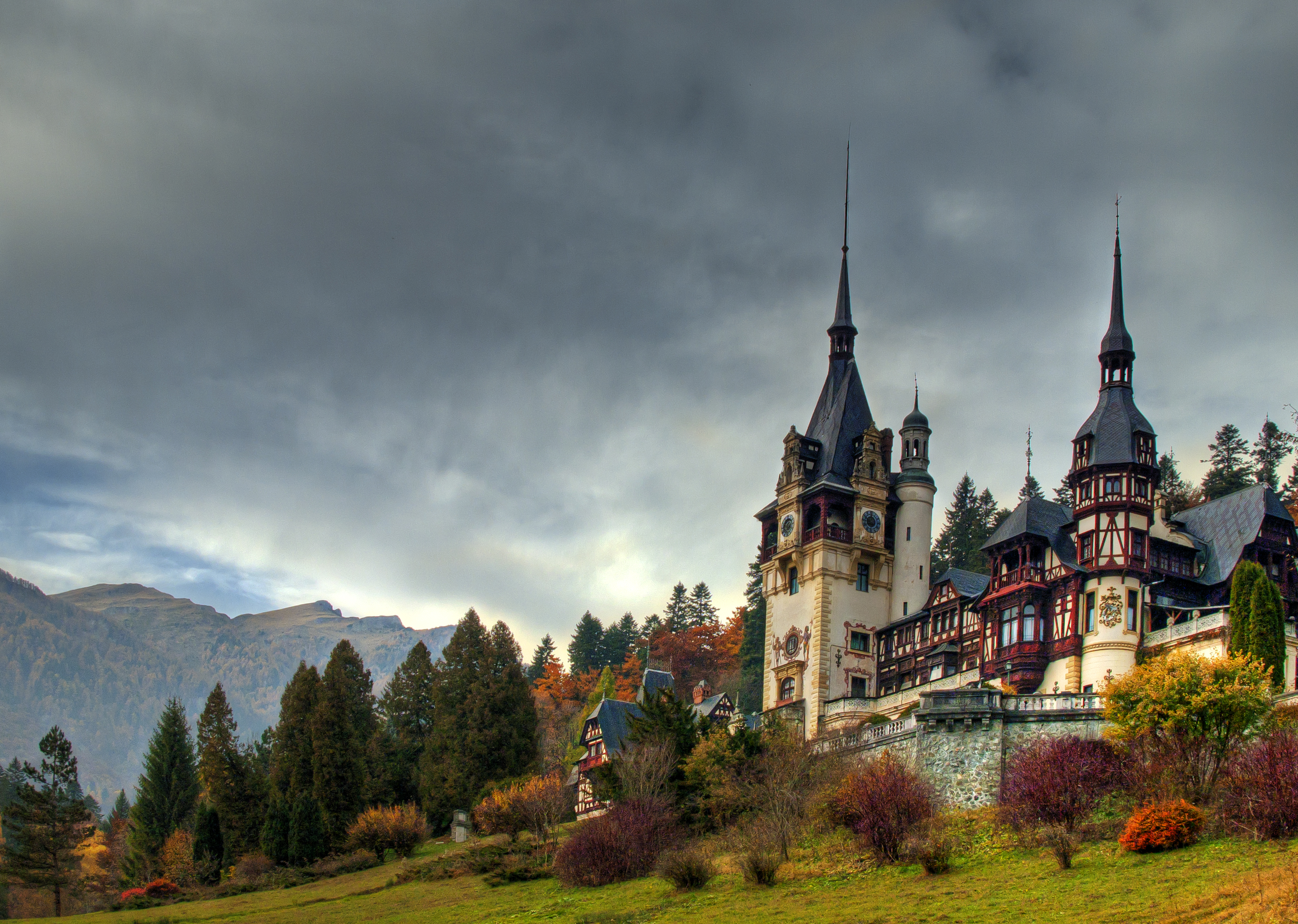
Peleș Castle

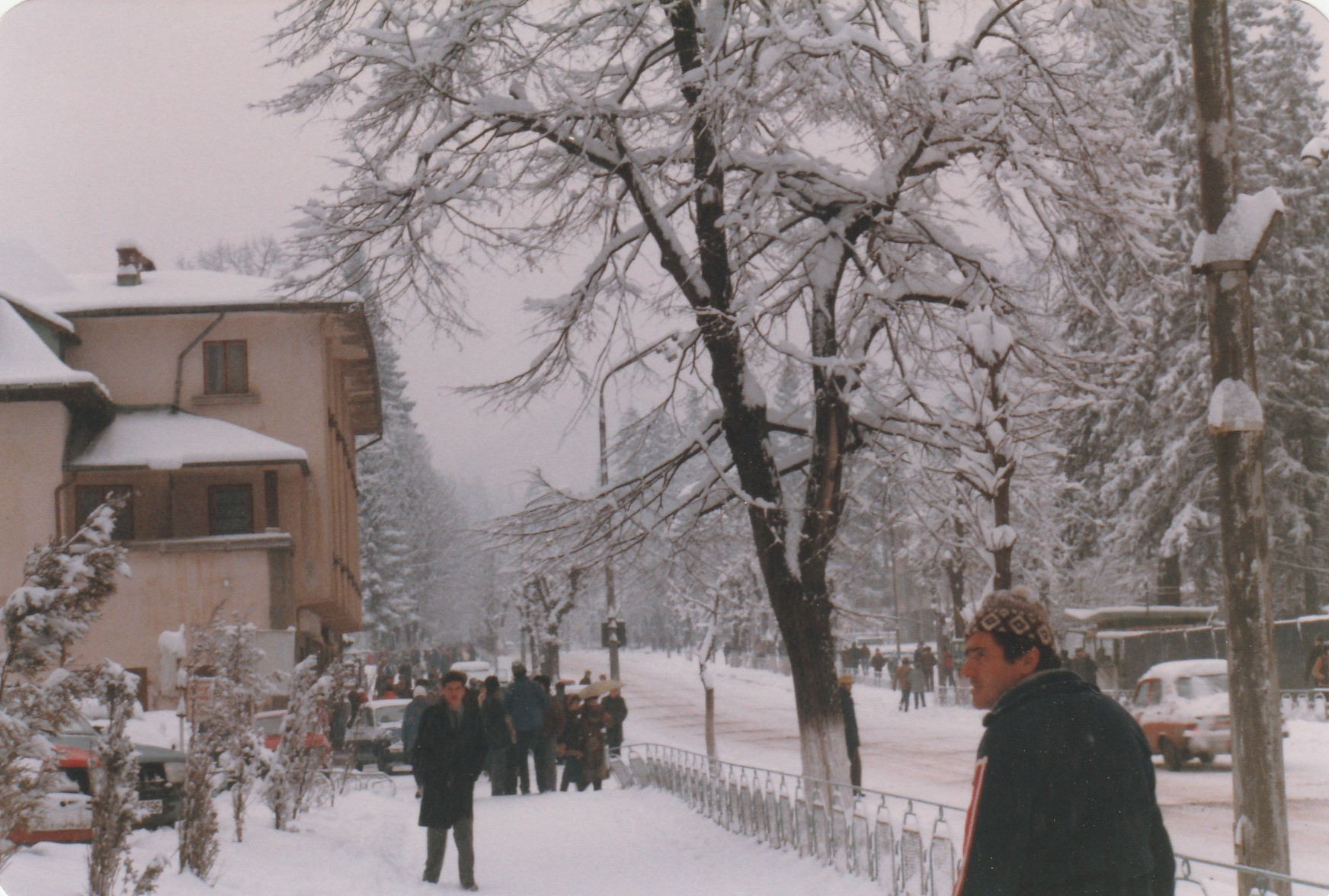
Sinaia during winter, February 1988
