= Death and state funeral of Michael I of Romania =

Funeral of Michael I of Romania
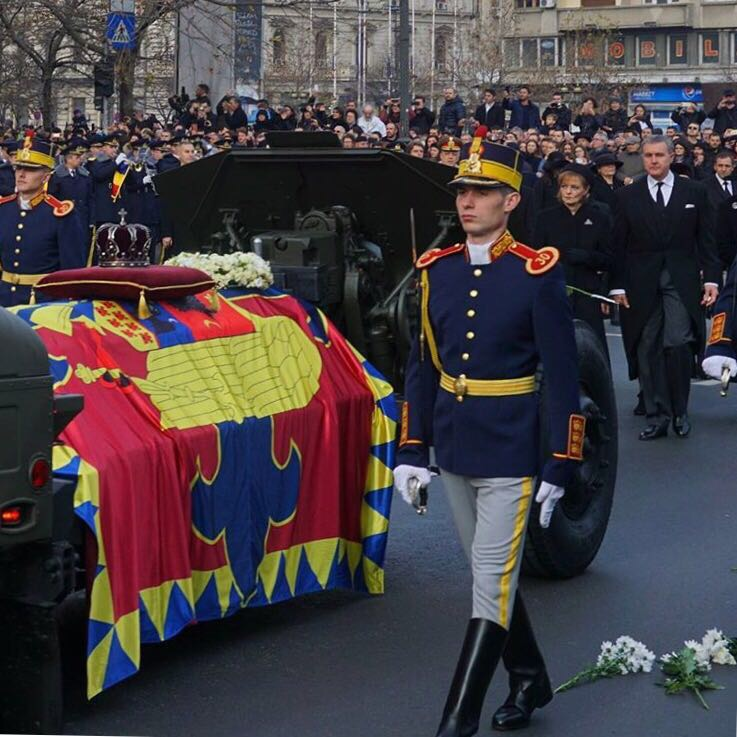
- Date: 16 December 2017
- Time: 10:25–18:40 EET (UTC+02:00)
- Duration: 384 minutes
- Venue: Royal Palace of Bucharest (religious service); Royal Palace Square (military and religious service); Romanian Patriarchal Cathedral (Funeral Mass); Curtea de Argeș Cathedral (burial service); Mausoleum of the Royal Family (resting place)
- Type: State funeral
- Participants: See § Guests
- Lying in state: Greek Orthodox Cathedral of Lausanne (11 – 12 December); Peles Castle (13 December); Royal Palace of Bucharest (13 – 16 December)

On 5 December 2017, Michael I, King of Romania from 1927 to 1930 and 1940 to 1947, died at his private residence in Switzerland at the age of 96, in the presence of his youngest daughter Princess Maria.

== Funeral ==
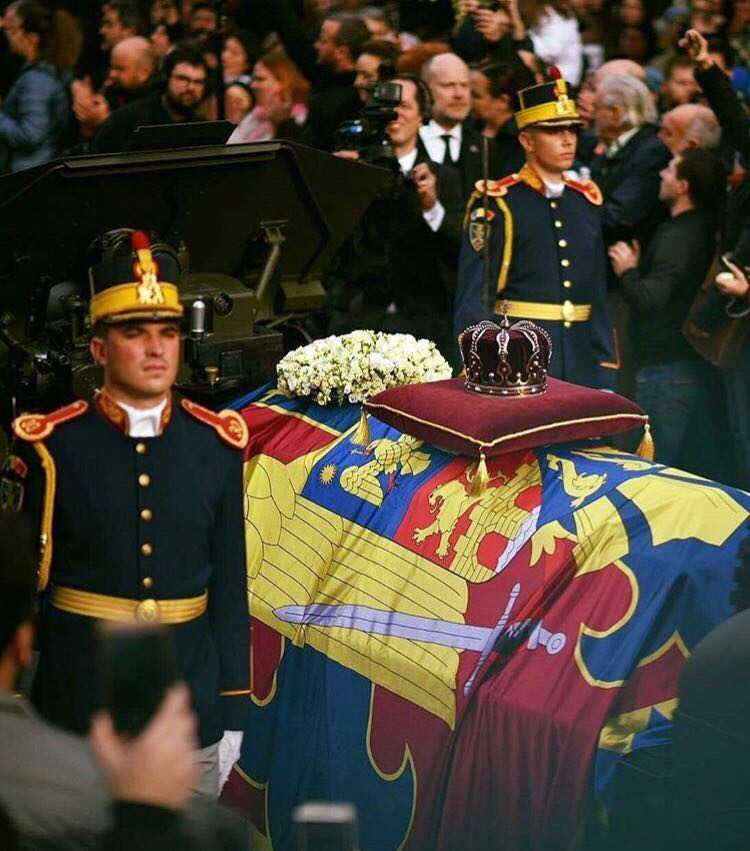
King Michael I's coffin during the funeral procession on Victory Avenue towards the Union Square and the Romanian Patriarchal Cathedral

On 13 December at 11:00 am, King Michael I's coffin, draped with his Royal Standard, was brought back to Romania, arriving at the Otopeni Airport in Bucharest from Lausanne, via Payerne Air Base, escorted by his second daughter, Princess Elena with her husband Alexander Nixon, fourth daughter Princess Sophie and also members of the Royal Household, were transported by the Romanian Air Force's Alenia C-27J Spartan Military Plane, which was flanked by four Mikoyan-Gurevich MiG-21 Military Combat Jets. The coffin was first taken to Peleș Castle at Sinaia in the Carpathian Mountains. Then, it was brought to Bucharest, where it was laid and displayed at the Royal Palace for two days.

Michael was buried on 16 December with full state honours in the Mausoleum of the Royal Family, on the grounds of the Curtea de Argeș Cathedral, together with his wife, Queen Anne, who died in 2016. The funeral ceremony was led by Patriarch Daniel of Romania. A period of national mourning was declared for 14–16 December.

Important Romanian politicians, including President Klaus Iohannis, Prime Minister Mihai Tudose, former President Ion Iliescu, as well as Liviu Dragnea, Călin Popescu-Tăriceanu, Gabriela Firea, Victor Ponta, Ludovic Orban, Dacian Cioloș, Adrian Năstase, Vasile Dîncu and Victor Ciorbea, participated in the funeral or expressed their condolences. A delegation of Moldovan politicians, led by Andrian Candu, also attended the funeral. Candu also proposed for 16 December to be declared a day of national mourning in Moldova, but President Igor Dodon refused, arguing that "King Michael led another state", but expressed his condolences.

His body was transferred from Bucharest to Curtea de Argeș with the help of a funeral train, the Royal Train, and a repainted domestic-traffic carriage, being led by a diesel locomotive. His funeral is stated to have been one of the largest in Romania, with almost a million Romanians flocking to the capital to pay their respects and watch the funeral, with it being comparable to the one of Corneliu Coposu in 1995.

A copy of the Steel Crown of Romania was placed on the coffin of the late king during the funeral.

== Guests ==
=== Romania ===
==== Immediate family ====
- Margareta, Custodian of the Crown of Romania and Prince Radu, The King’s eldest daughter and her husband
- Princess Elena and The Hon. Alexander Nixon, The King’s second daughter and her husband.
  - The Hon. Nicolae de Roumanie-Medforth-Mills and The Hon. Alina de Roumanie-Medforth-Mills, The King’s grandson and granddaughter-in-law
  - The Hon. Elisabeta-Karina de Roumanie-Medforth-Mills, The King’s granddaughter
- Princess Irina, The King’s third daughter
- Princess Sophie, The King’s fourth daughter
- Princess Maria, The King’s youngest daughter
- Archduke Dominik and Archduchess Emanuella of Austria-Tuscany, The King’s first cousin and his wife
- Archduchess Maria Magdalena of Austria-Tuscany and Baron Hans von Holzhausen, The King’s first cousin and her husband
- Baroness Alexandra von Holzhausen, Mrs Ferch, The King’s first cousin once removed

=== Politicians ===
- Klaus Iohannis, President of Romania and First Lady Carmen Iohannis
  - Emil Constantinescu, former President of Romania
- Călin Popescu-Tăriceanu, President of the Senate
- Liviu Dragnea, President of the Chamber of Deputies
- Mihai Tudose, Prime Minister of Romania
  - Dacian Cioloș, former Prime Minister of Romania
- Marcel Ciolacu, Deputy Prime Minister of Romania
- Paul Stănescu, Deputy Prime Minister of Romania
- Mihai Fifor, Minister of Defence
- Petre Daea, Minister of Agriculture and Rural Development

=== Foreign ===
==== Royalty ====
- Crown Prince Leka and Crown Princess Elia of Albania
- Karl, Archduke of Austria
- Archduke Georg of Austria
- Archduke Martin and Archduchess Katharina of Austria-Este
- (Bahrain) Prince Rashid bin Khalifa Al Khalifa
- (Belgium) Princess Astrid, Archduchess of Austria-Este and Prince Lorenz, Archduke of Austria-Este
- Tsar Simeon II of Bulgaria
- Princess Chantal d’Orléans
- Germany
  - Prince Georg Friedrich, Prince of Prussia
  - Duke Eberhard of Württemberg
  - The Prince Maximilian, Margrave of Baden and Princess Valerie, Margravine of Baden
- Queen Anne-Marie of Greece
  - Prince Nikolaos of Greece and Denmark
- Princess Irene of Greece and Denmark
- Prince Emanuele Filiberto of Savoy
- (Jordan) Princess Muna al-Hussein
- (Jordan) Princess Rym al-Ali
- Princess Isabelle, Princess Philipp of Liechtenstein
- The Grand Duke of Luxembourg
- Duarte Pio, Duke of Braganza
- Maria Vladimirovna, Grand Duchess of Russia
- Crown Prince Alexander of Serbia and Crown Princess Katherine
- King Juan Carlos I of Spain and Queen Sofia
- The King and Queen of Sweden
- (United Kingdom) The Prince of Wales

==== Nobility ====
- Princess Tatiana Radziwiłł and Mr Jean Fruchaud
- Princess Anne of Ligne and Mr Charles de Fabribeckers de Cortils et Grâce

=== Dignitaries ===
- France: Frédéric Mitterrand, former Minister of Culture and Communication

==== Ambassadors ====
- Canada: Kevin Hamilton, Ambassador of Canada to Romania
- India: Dr. A.V.S Ramesh Chandra, Ambassador of India to Romania
- Macedonia: Pande Lazarevski, Ambassador of Macedonia to Romania
- Sweden: Anneli Lindahl Kenny, Ambassador of Sweden to Romania
- United States of America: Hans Klemm, Ambassador of the United States of America to Romania
- United Kingdom: Paul Brummell, Ambassador of the United Kingdom to Romania
- Vatican: Archbishop Miguel Maury Buendía, Apostolic Nuncio of the Holy See to Romania
- Vatican: Archbishop Nikola Eterović, Apostolic Nuncio of the Holy See to Germany

== Memorial concert ==
On 8 December 2017, German conductor Matthias Manasi conducted a worldwide broadcast memorial concert for Michael with the National Radio Orchestra of Romania and the Academic Radio Choir at Sala Radio at the Romanian Radio Broadcasting Company in Bucharest. Matthias Manasi conducted the Requiem by Gabriel Fauré with the soloists Veronica Anușca and Ștefan Ignat and pieces by Beethoven, Chausson and Massenet with the Romanian violinist Alexandru Tomescu as the soloist.

== Gallery ==
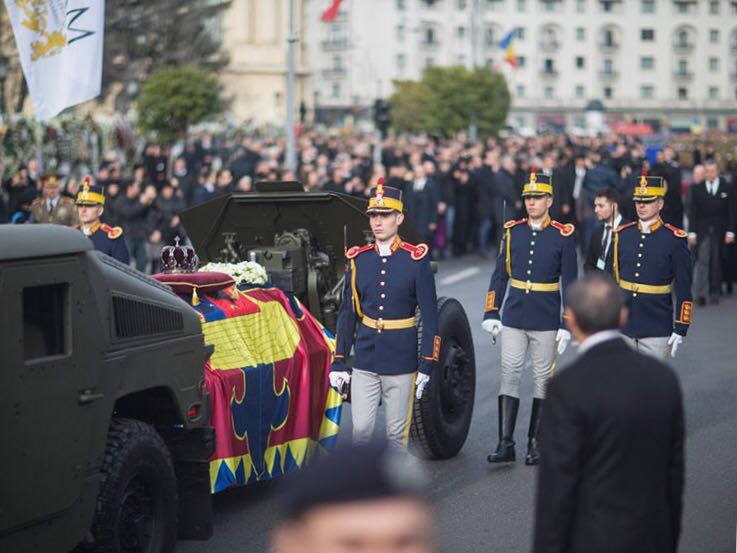

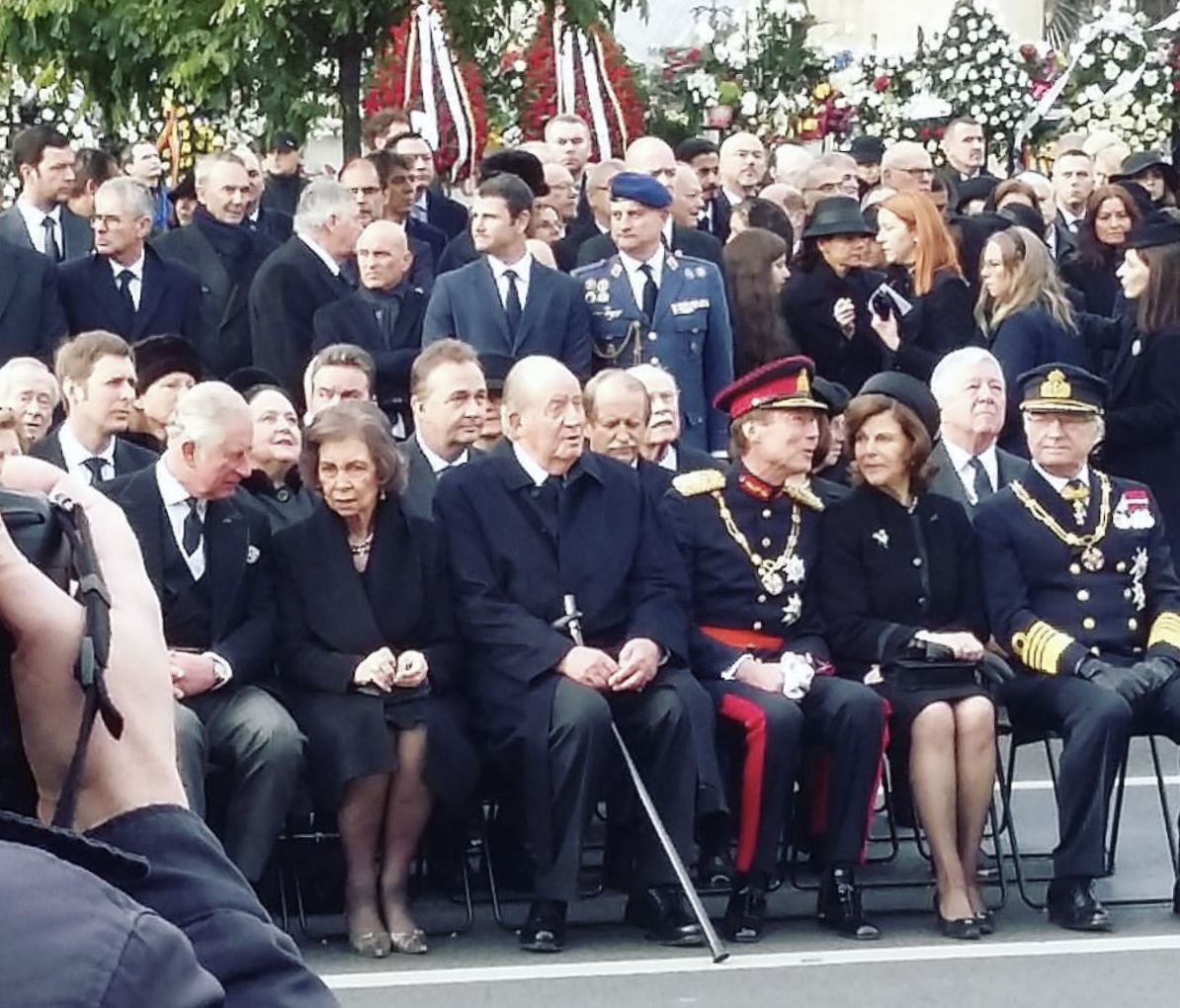
Royalty members at the funeral

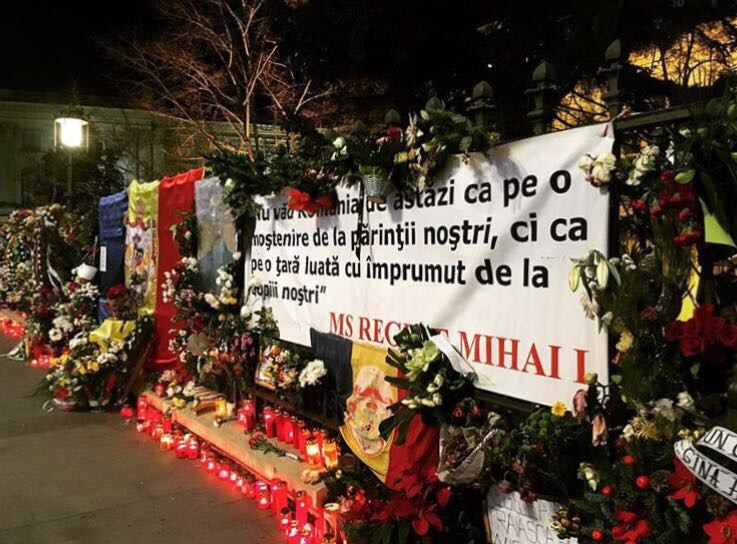

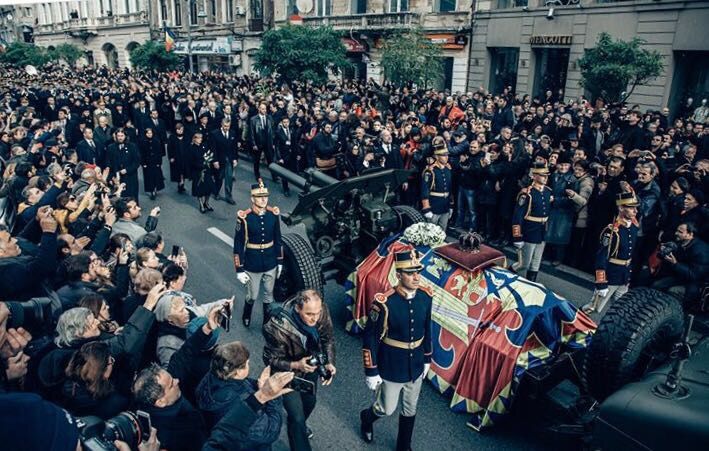

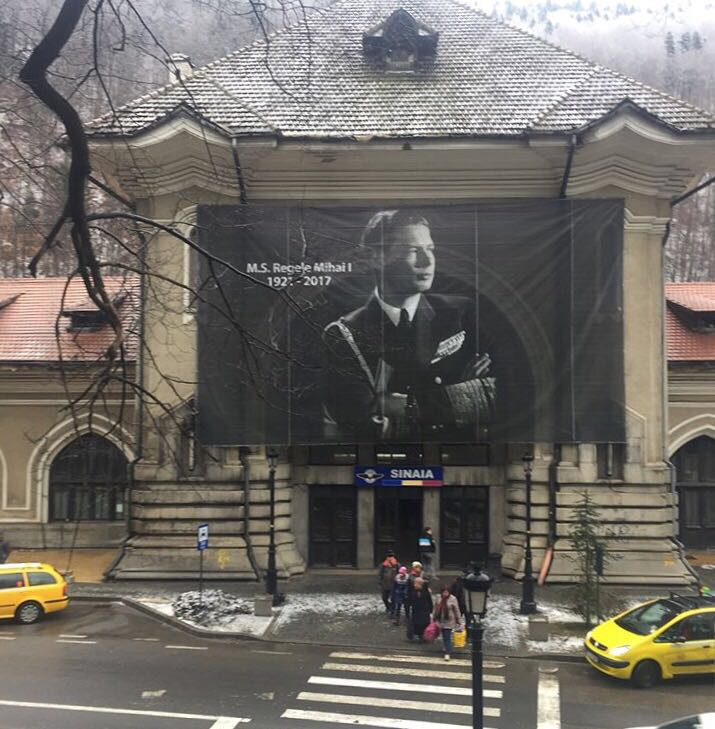
Banner in Sinaia

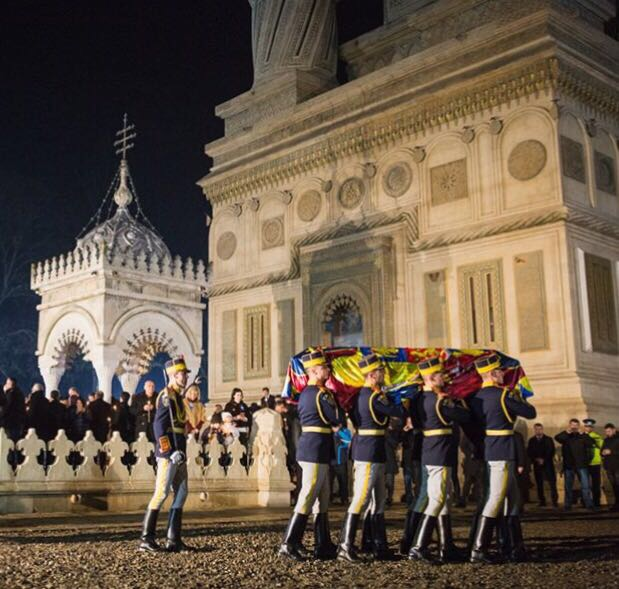
The Royal mausoleum at Curtea de Argeș Monastery

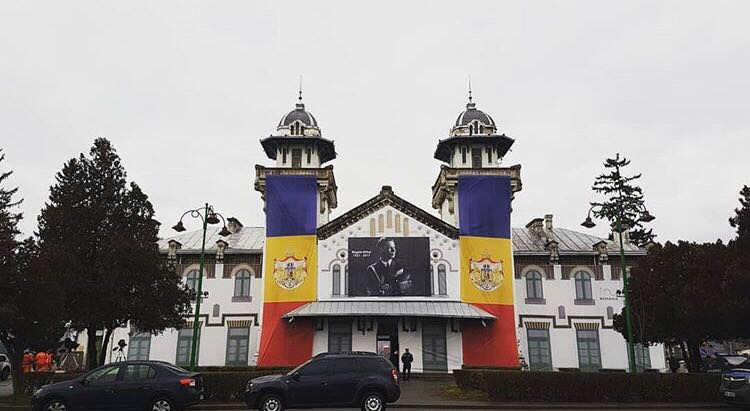

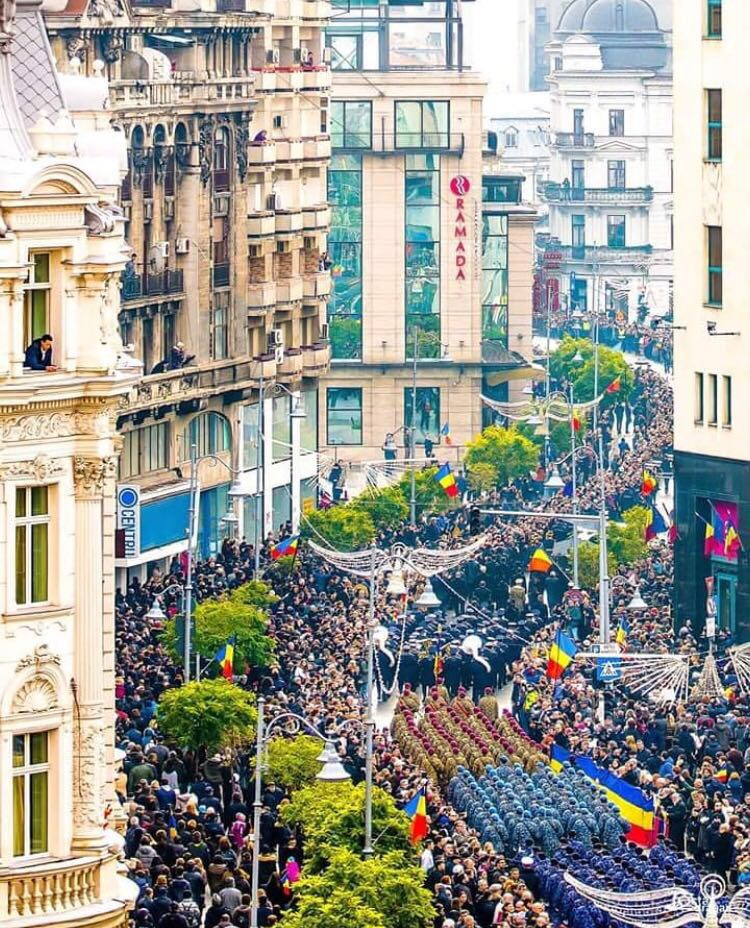

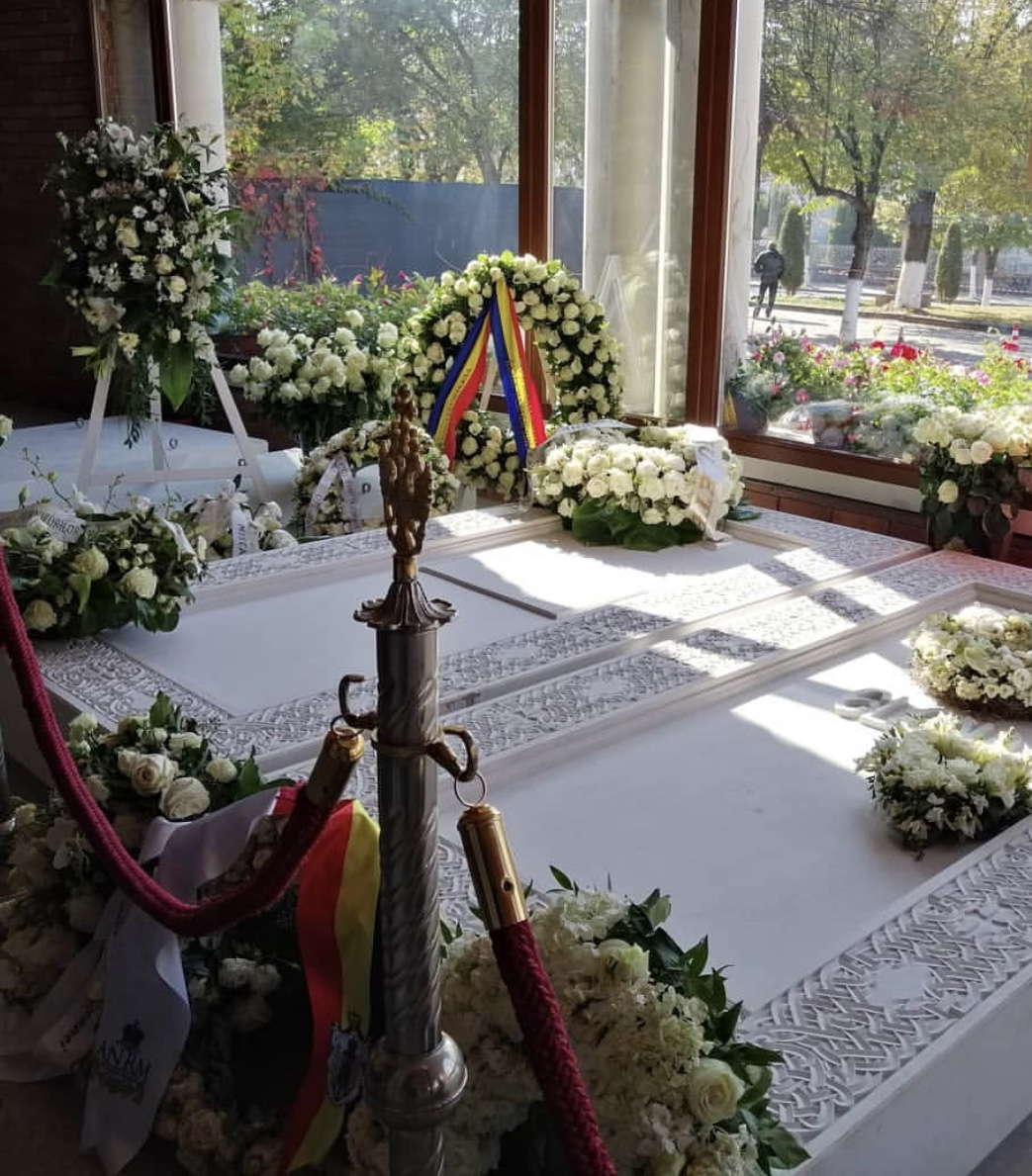
Tomb of King Michael and his wife, Queen Anne of Romania

== See also ==
- Monarchism in Romania
