= Decoration of the Cross of Queen Elisabeth =

Decoration of the Cross of Queen Elisabeth Decoratia Crucea Regina Elisabeta

Awarded by King of Romania
- Type: State decoration
- Religious affiliation: Romanian Orthodox
- Ribbon: Pale Blue with thin Gold stripes on the end of either side.
- Eligibility: Exclusively for Romanian women only.
- Awarded for: Outstanding contributions or services to the wounded, sick, ambulances and hospitals.
- Status: Abolished in 1947
- Sovereign: King Michael I of Romania
- Grades: Dame

Precedence
- Next (higher): Royal Order of the Eagle of Romania
- Next (lower): Decoration of the Cross of Sanitary Merit
- The Ribbon of the Decoration

The Decoration of the Cross of Queen Elisabeth (Romanian: Decorația Crucea Regina Elisabeta) was a Decoration established by Prince Carol I of Romania by Royal Decree 2270 on 6 October 1878 for his wife, Princess Elisabeth of Wied, to award Romanian women she deemed to have achieved outstanding service for caring for the wounded and sick, whether directly in ambulances and hospital campaigns, or indirectly through donations or other actions.

The Decoration was abolished during the abolishment of the Romanian Monarchy in 1947 and wasn't reinstated as a Dynastic Decoration of the Decorations of the Romanian Royal House by Former King Michael I.
