= Princess Elena of Romania =

Romanian royal (born 1950)

Princess Elena
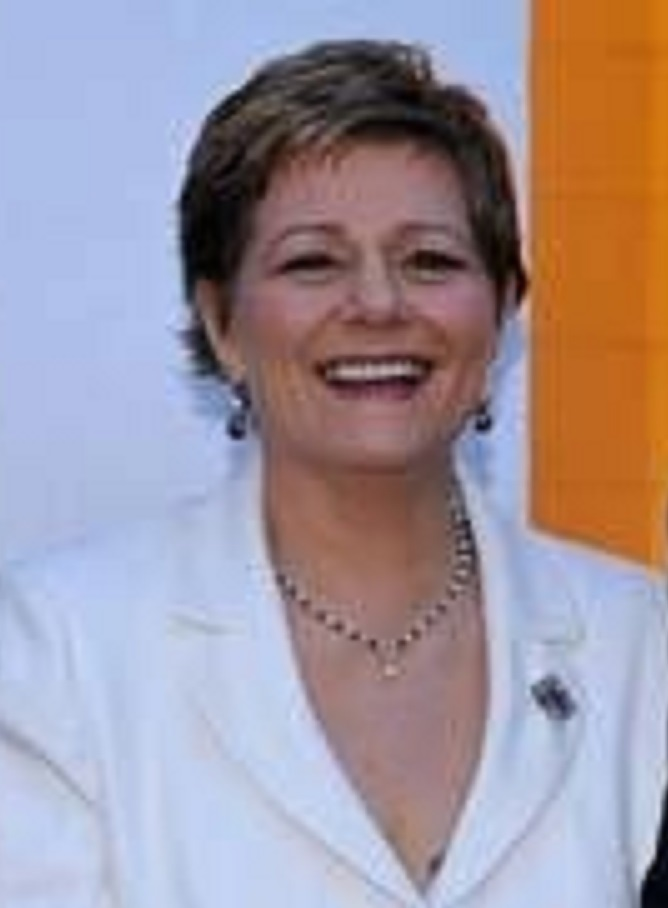
- Elena in 2013
- Born: 15 November 1950 (age 75); Lausanne, Switzerland
- Spouse: Robin Medforth-Mills (m. 1983; div. 1991) Alexander Nixon (m. 1998)
- Issue: Nicholas de Roumanie Medforth-Mills; Elisabeta de Roumanie
- House: Romania (since 2011); Hohenzollern-Sigmaringen (until 2011)
- Father: Michael I of Romania
- Mother: Anne of Bourbon-Parma

Princess Elena of Romania (born 15 November 1950) is the second daughter of King Michael I and Queen Anne of Romania.

Elena is first in the line of succession to the former Romanian throne and headship of the House of Romania as her elder sister Margareta's heir presumptive.

== Early life ==
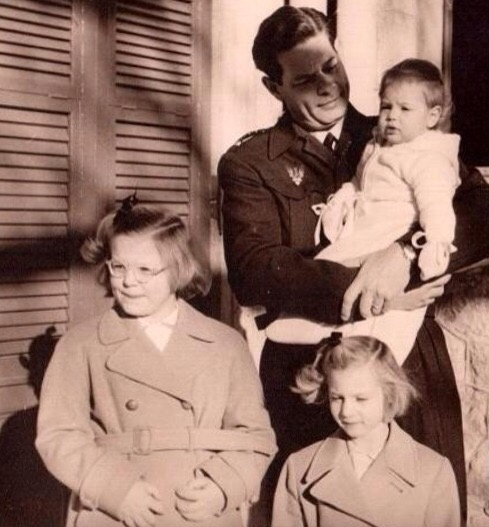
Elena (left) with her two younger sisters, Irina (right) and Sofia held by Michael I of Romania

=== Birth ===
Elena was born on 15 November 1950 at Clinique de Montchoisi in Lausanne, Switzerland as the second daughter of King Michael I and Queen Anne. She was baptised in the Orthodox faith; her godmothers were her paternal grandmother Helen, Queen Mother of Romania (who was also her namesake) and also Queen Mary of the United Kingdom.

=== Childhood ===
Elena spent her childhood at her family homes in Lausanne, Switzerland, and in the United Kingdom at Ayot House, St Lawrence, Hertfordshire; during holidays she and her sisters spent time with their grandmother, Helen, Queen Mother in Florence, Italy at Villa Sparta and in Denmark with Princess Margaret and Prince René. She and her sisters were told "fascinating tales of a homeland they couldn't visit" by their father.

== Education and career ==
Elena received her primary education in Switzerland and her secondary at Effingham House in Little Common, Bexhill-on-Sea, East Sussex; she was fond of sports during her school years, playing on goal defence in the netball team.

In the mid-1970s, Elena taught handicapped children for a short period of time in London and after her leaving, she began a two-year course in art restoration; following the end of her course she worked in an art restoration firm in London.

== Activities ==
In the 1980s Elena along with her first husband Robin Medforth-Mills started a project to train 45 handicapped Ethiopian refugees in printing, bookbinding and leatherwork. In 1982 Elena founded an International school in Gezira, Sudan.

In 1990 along with Elena’s first husband, the then-Lord Mayor of Newcastle, Terry Cooney, and Harry Charrington was a founder-member of the North-East Relief Fund for Romania, which helped victims of the Ceaușescu regime.

On 26 June 2011, Elena and her second husband Alexander Nixon visited the Queen Elizabeth Sixth Form College in Darlington, County Durham, England to present awards to students who went to Romania for voluntary work and helping to build and repair housing in Brașov, a project based around the Roma community.

On 3 October 2011, Elena attended the 100th commemorative anniversary of the historic Western travels of ʻAbdu'l-Bahá in London, as a great-granddaughter of Queen Marie who had converted to the Baháʼí Faith, Elena spoke of how her great grandmother's Baháʼí legacy has inspired her to help those of need.

On 25 April 2012, for the Diamond Jubilee festivities of Queen Elizabeth II, Elena and her second husband inaugurated Royal teas: the UK's only Royal Tea room in Stanhope, County Durham. Following the inauguration, on 19 May Elena along with King Michael I, Crown Princess Margareta, her brother-in-law Prince Radu, her husband Alexander Nixon and her son Prince Nicholas attended a Military parade at Windsor Great Park and a Garden party at Windsor Castle hosted by Prince Andrew, Duke of York and Prince Edward, Earl of Wessex.

Elena also annually attends the Guildhall banquet of the Guild of Freemen of the City of London and the delegation of the Two Sicilian Sacred Military Constantinian Order of Saint George in London.

== In Romania ==
After 50 years of exile of the Romanian royal family from Romania, in 1990 Elena's sisters Crown Princess Margareta and Princess Sofia visited Romania for the first time following the Romanian Revolution and the overthrow of the Communist dictator Nicolae Ceaușescu in December 1989, she along with the royal family were involved in helping the Romanians.

Elena's first official appearance in Romania was on 19 April 1992 on Easter Day along with former King Michael I, his wife Anne, her first husband Robin Medforth-Mills, and her son Nicholas, where they were met with hundreds of thousands of supporters; Elena and her son Nicholas famously waved the Royal Flag from a balcony in Revolution Square. She came again on Christmas Day of 1997 when the entire royal family entered Romania for the first time after 50 years of exile.

Since her first visit Elena occasionally visited Romania for family gatherings and for occasions such as: the 60th-birthday celebration of Crown Princess Margareta and the 90th-birthday celebrations of King Michael I. However, since 2013 Elena has increased her activities in Romania by attending investiture ceremonies, presenting awards, book launches and Christmas gatherings.

Elena was present at the lying in state of King Michael I in December 2017 and Queen Anne in August 2016 (held firstly at Peleș Castle, and then in the Throne Room of the Royal Palace in both cases), at their public funerals in Bucharest and at their burials in Curtea de Argeș.

Elena currently spends her time between Britain with her second husband Alexander and her daughter Elisabeta-Karina at her estate in Easington, County Durham and in Romania at Elisabeta Palace.

== Marriages ==
=== First marriage ===
On 20 July 1983, Elena married Robin Medforth-Mills (1942–2002) in a civil ceremony at Durham, England. On 24 September 1983, they married in a royal ceremony at a Greek Orthodox church in Lausanne, Switzerland. The wedding party included King Michael I, his cousin former King Constantine II of Greece and his wife Queen Anne-Marie, who all served as Koumbaros; bridesmaids included her youngest sister Princess Maria, her second cousins Princess Alexia of Greece and Denmark and Princess Mafalda of Savoy; and also Fabiola Fruchaud, daughter of Princess Tatiana Radziwiłł. Elena and Robin had two children:

- Nicholas Michael de Roumanie Medforth-Mills (b. La Tour Hospital, Meyrin, Geneva, Switzerland 1 April 1985), formerly HRH Prince Nicholas of Romania. He married Alina Maria Binder, a Romanian journalist, in a civil ceremony on 6 October 2017 in Henley-on-Thames. On 30 September 2018 the couple married religiously at Saint Elijah Church in Sinaia, and the party took place at Sinaia Casino. He has three children, a daughter from a previous relationship with Nicoleta Cîrjan, and a daughter and son from his marriage:
  - Iris Anna Cîrjan (born 9 February 2016)
  - Maria Alexandra Medforth-Mills (born 7 November 2020)
  - Mihai de Roumanie-Medforth-Mills (born 15 April 2022)
- Elisabeta Karina de Roumanie Medforth-Mills (b. Princess Mary Maternity Hospital, Newcastle-upon-Tyne, England, 4 January 1989), goddaughter of the novelist Dame Catherine Cookson and Margareta, Custodian of the Romanian Crown. She married civilly Kurt Metcalfe on 26 April 2024 at Barnard Castle. She has a son from her marriage:
  - Augustus Mihai de Roumanie Metcalfe (born 23 May 2024)

They were divorced on 28 November 1991 after 8 years of marriage.

=== Second marriage ===
Elena was remarried on 14 August 1998 in a civil ceremony at Peterlee to Alexander Philips Nixon McAteer (born 22 October 1964). The marriage was private and was attended by the Romanian royal family, the groom's mother, and close friends. The groom was given the style His Excellency Domnul Alexander McAteer. Alexander changed his surname to Nixon. He is a Knight of the Sacred Military Constantinian Order of Saint George, and holds a number of Romanian decorations. He has consistently refused to take any royal title.

Elena and Alexander married religiously at the Coronation Cathedral, Alba Iulia, on 11 September 2013, privately.

== Titles, styles and honours ==
=== Titles and styles ===
- 15 November 1950 – 10 May 2011: Her Royal Highness The Princess Elena of Romania, Princess of Hohenzollern-Sigmaringen (Note: On 10 May 2011, King Michael I severed the Romanian Royal House's historical and dynastic links with the House of Hohenzollern-Sigmaringen. From that date, members of the Romanian royal family ceased using titles conferred by the princely House of Hohenzollern.<ref>"Regele Mihai I rupe legăturile dinastice cu Casa Hohenzollern". romania-actualitati.ro (in Romanian).)
- 10 May 2011 – present: Her Royal Highness The Princess Elena of Romania (Note: Following the death of King Michael I on 5 December 2017 and Margareta's succession as head of the Royal House, Elena became heir to the headship. Although the Fundamental Rules of the Royal House consequently designate her as Crown Princess of Romania, the Royal House generally refers to her in public communications as Princess Elena of Romania.<ref>"ASR Principesa Elena". Casa Majestății Sale.)

=== Honours ===
- House of Romania: Knight Grand Officer of the Royal Order of Carol I
- House of Romania: Knight Grand Cross of the Royal Order of the Crown
- House of Romania: Knight of the Royal Decoration of the Custodian of the Crown of Romania
- House of Romania: Knight of the Royal Decoration of Nihil Sine Deo
- (Kingdom of the Two Sicilies) Two Sicilian Royal Family: Knight Grand Cross of the Royal Order of Francis I
- (Kingdom of the Two Sicilies) Two Sicilian Royal Family: Recipient of the Medal of Merit of Saint George, Special Class
- (Kingdom of Montenegro) Montenegrin Royal Family: Knight Grand Cross of the Royal Order of Prince Danilo I

=== Royal standard ===
Royal standard used by Princess Elena

Princess Elena uses the royal standard assigned to the royal princesses of Romania, which is also used by her sisters Princess Irina, Princess Sofia and Princess Maria. The standard has a blue field and bears the lesser version of the Royal Arms of Romania at its centre.
