= Nicholas Medforth-Mills =

Member of the Romanian royal family

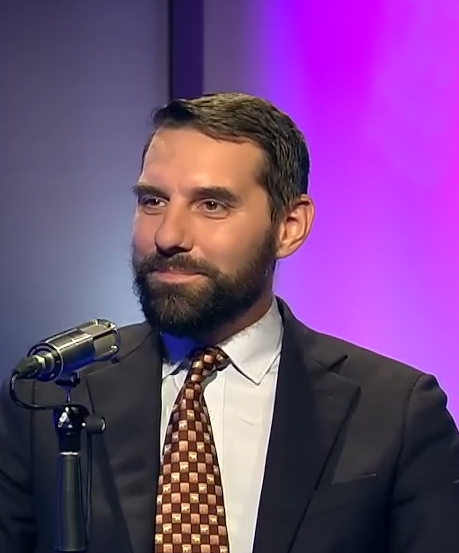
- Nicholas de Roumanie in 2023
- Born: 1 April 1985 (age 41); La Tour Hospital, Meyrin, Switzerland
- Spouse: Alina-Maria Binder (m. 2017)
- Children: 3
- Parents: Robin Medforth-Mills (father); Princess Elena of Romania (mother)
- House: Romania (2007–2015)

Nicholas Michael de Roumanie Medforth-Mills (born 1 April 1985), formerly known as Prince Nicholas of Romania, is the eldest child and only son of Princess Elena of Romania and Robin Medforth-Mills. As a grandson of King Michael of Romania, he was third in line to the defunct throne of Romania according to a new family statute enacted in 2007, that also conferred the title of a "prince of Romania" on him which was removed in 2015. The statute and the titles it confers have no standing in the law of the republic.

== Early life ==
=== Birth ===
Nicholas de Roumanie Medforth-Mills was born on 1 April 1985 at La Tour Hospital in Meyrin, a commuter town near Geneva, Switzerland, the first child and son of Princess Elena of Romania and her first husband Robin Medforth-Mills and the second grandchild of King Michael I of Romania and his wife Queen Anne.

He was baptized in the Orthodox faith, his godparents being Queen Anne (his maternal grandmother) and Crown Princess Margareta of Romania (his maternal aunt).

His sister, Elisabeta-Karina, was born 4 January 1989.

=== Childhood ===
Until the age of four, Medforth-Mills lived with his sister and parents at the Romanian royal family's residence in Versoix, Switzerland. The family moved to England in 1989 where they took up residence at Flass Hall, Esh Winning in County Durham.

Medforth-Mills joined the Beaver Scouts at age five. During his childhood, he developed an interest in cars, an interest shared with his grandfather King Michael I. During holidays in Versoix, Switzerland, with his maternal grandparents, Nicholas spent hours in his grandfather's garage, watching him maintain his Jeep collection. In an interview with historian Filip-Lucian Iorga, Nicholas recalled the time spent with King Michael, and how he had been allowed to drive one of his cars, a Ford which once belonged to General George S. Patton; the vehicle was given to his grandfather by Queen Anne's paternal uncle Prince Felix of Bourbon-Parma as a gift. He also recalled spending time with Queen Anne at Versoix where they used to fish and play golf together.

As a descendant of Queen Victoria of the United Kingdom and King Christian IX of Denmark, he regularly met with many of his extended relatives.

== Education ==
Medforth-Mills attended Argyle House School, Sunderland, England which he left in 1999 with eight GCSEs - English Language, English Literature, Mathematics, Science (Chemistry, Biology and Physics), French, German, Information Technology, and Geography.

In 1999, he enrolled with Shiplake College, Henley-on-Thames, England where he left with three A-levels of French, Business Sciences and Physical Education. During this time he also took part in the Duke of Edinburgh's Award.

Before enrolling for university he took a five-year "Gap year", where:

- In 2004, before enrolling for university, Nicholas was assistant leader of an expedition to South Africa, Namibia, Botswana and Zimbabwe.
- In 2005, he lived in Kenya for four months and joined an expedition to Madagascar.
- In 2006, he was employed in Kenya as a rafting trainer for the British Army.

== Activities in Romania ==
Nicholas’s first major appearance in Romania was on 19 April 1992 on Easter Day along with his grandparents King Michael I and Queen Anne and with his mother and her second husband Alexander Nixon.

Nicholas came again for the second time on Christmas Day 1997, when the entire royal family set foot in Romania for the first time after nearly five decades of exile. In 2002, he visited Romania for the third time; he stayed at Elisabeta Palace. During this visit he started to consider his role as a member of the royal family.

In 2008, de Roumanie Medforth-Mills became more involved in the public life of Romania, taking part, for instance, at the 2008 UNITER theatre gala and in visits throughout the country with his aunt, Crown Princess Margareta, and Radu Duda.

== Royal status ==
=== Prince of Romania ===
Royal monogram of Prince Nicholas

In 1997, Romanian monarchists intended to ask Michael to designate a male heir-presumptive from the House of Hohenzollern in keeping with the rules of the last royal constitution which were based on agnatic primogeniture and Salic law. The monarchists eventually agreed on a compromise and requested him to designate a male rather than female heir-presumptive, in the person of Nicholas. However, under the influence of Queen Anne, Michael rejected the monarchists' request, and at the end of 1997, he designated Princess Margareta as heir presumptive in keeping with the European Convention on Human Rights, which meant Nicholas would only succeed to the headship of the royal family after the deaths of King Michael, Crown Princess Margareta and his mother.

In 2005, King Michael told Nicholas that he could choose to have the chance of becoming a "prince of Romania" which would mean assuming responsibility in a conscious manner by starting to work for the country.

On 30 December 2007, the press office of King Michael announced that Nicholas de Roumanie Medforth-Mills would receive the title "prince of Romania" with the style of "royal highness", coming into effect on Nicholas's 25th birthday. On 1 April 2010, by virtue of his new title, he became a member of the Romanian royal family and was decorated with the Nihil Sine Deo, the highest of royal decorations at the time.

In February 2008, Nicholas stated in an interview with the Romanian daily newspaper Cotidianul that if the Romanian people asked him to become king, he would not refuse.

In September 2012, after his university studies, he moved to Romania to undertake more of the royal family's public activities.

=== Removal of titles and illegitimate daughter ===
On 1 August 2015, former King Michael of Romania signed a document removing the title prince of Romania and the qualification of royal highness from his grandson. Medforth-Mills also has been removed from the line of succession, as defined by his grandfather. The former king took the decision after considering that Romania needed a ruler marked by modesty and moral principles, respect and thought for others after the "reign and life" of his eldest daughter, Crown Princess Margareta, will have finished. In issuing the declaration, the former king expressed the hope that "Nicholas will find in future years a suitable way to serve the ideals and use the qualities that God gave him". Nicholas's mother, Princess Elena, received notification of the former king's decision in a personal letter. The validity of the document has been challenged by Nicholas who has stated there was no signature whatsoever from King Michael.

The move "stunned Romanians" and "sparked speculation that a jealous relative had sought to edge Nicholas out of the succession." The exclusion of Nicholas from the royal succession was due to the birth of an illegitimate daughter, from a short relationship with Nicoleta Cîrjan. The child, Iris Anna Cirjan, born in 2016 in Brașov, was not initially recognized by the former prince.

Nicholas released a press statement on 18 November 2017 from London about the child. Point 2 of the Press release stated, that on learning of the pregnancy, "I returned to Romania in November 2015 to resolve the situation with my alleged child. Due to the constant lack of co-operation from the mother of my alleged child, this situation has remained unclear. So far, there is no medical evidence to support the mother's accusations. Therefore, any accusations that are related to this subject are unfounded." On 27 May 2019, Nicholas confirmed via a Facebook post that paternity tests had confirmed the illegitimate daughter is his, and that he had assumed legal responsibility for her.

=== Allegation of assault ===
On 8 November 2017, during Michael I's final illness, Crown Princess Margareta filed a complaint with Swiss police alleging that Nicholas tried to force his way into his grandfather's home. It alleged that Nicholas "physically and verbally assaulted" three staff members, while he accused his relatives of trying to stop him seeing his grandfather and discrediting his name. The former king died on 5 December 2017. Nicholas was acquitted of all charges by the court of Nyon in October 2021.

== Marriage ==
Nicholas married civilly in Henley-on-Thames on 6 October 2017 to Alina-Maria Binder (born in Constanța on 26 January 1988). On 30 September 2018 the couple married religiously at Saint Elijah Church in Sinaia, and the wedding reception took place at Sinaia Casino. They have a daughter (Maria Alexandra) born on 7 November 2020, and a son (Mihai) born on 15 April 2022.

== Honours ==
- Royal House of Romania: Family Order "Custodian of the Romanian Crown"
- Royal House of Romania: Royal Decoration "Nihil Sine Deo"

== Bibliography ==
- Mosley, Charles. Blood Royal – From the time of Alexander the Great to Queen Elizabeth II (Ruvigny Ltd, London, 2002) (ISBN 0-9524229-9-9) (page 288)
