= Curtea de Argeș Cathedral =

Romanian Orthodox cathedral in Argeș, Romania

- Catedrala Curtea de Argeș
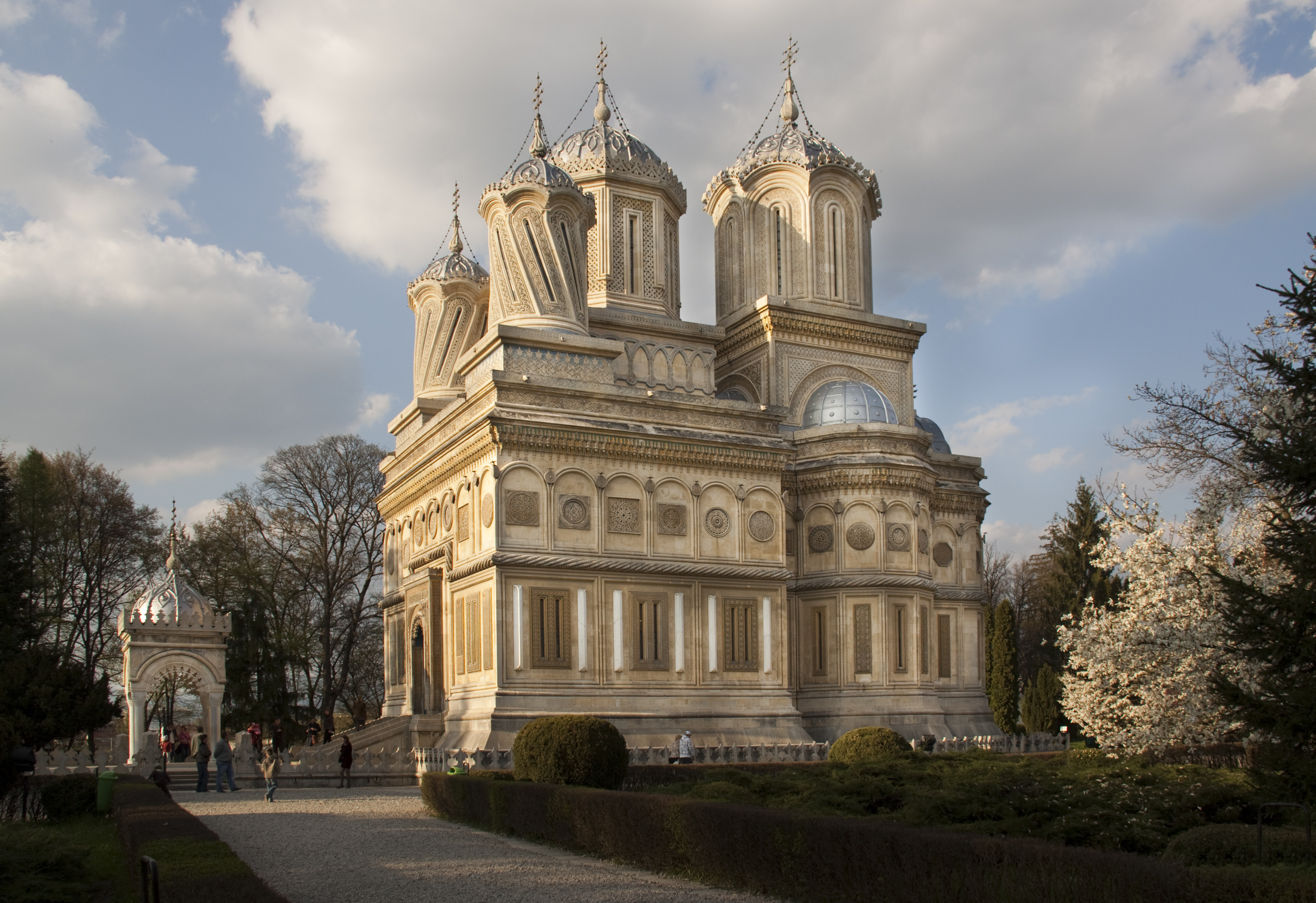

Religion
- Affiliation: Romanian Orthodox Church
- Ecclesiastical or organisational status: Cathedral
- Patron: Dormition of the Mother of God (15 August)
- Year consecrated: 1517 (original); 1886 (following the last restoration)
- Status: Active

Location
- Location: Curtea de Argeș, Argeș County, Romania
- Interactive map of Curtea de Argeș Cathedral
- Coordinates: 45°9′25″N 24°40′31″E

Architecture
- Architects: André Lecomte du Noüy; Nicolae Gabrielescu
- Type: church
- Style: Byzantine
- Founder: Neagoe Basarab
- Groundbreaking: 1512
- Completed: 1517

Specifications
- Length: 30 m (98 ft)
- Width: 10 m (33 ft)
- Height (max): 30 m

The Cathedral of Curtea de Argeș (early 16th century) is a Romanian Orthodox cathedral in Curtea de Argeș, Romania. It is located on the grounds of the Curtea de Argeș Monastery, and is dedicated to the Dormition of the Mother of God. The building is the seat of the Archdiocese of Argeș and Muscel.

The cathedral is faced with pale grey limestone, which was easily chiselled and then hardened on exposure. The interior is of brick, plastered and decorated with frescoes. Nearby on the grounds stands the large Neo-Romanian style Royal Palace built in the late 19th century.

== Architecture ==
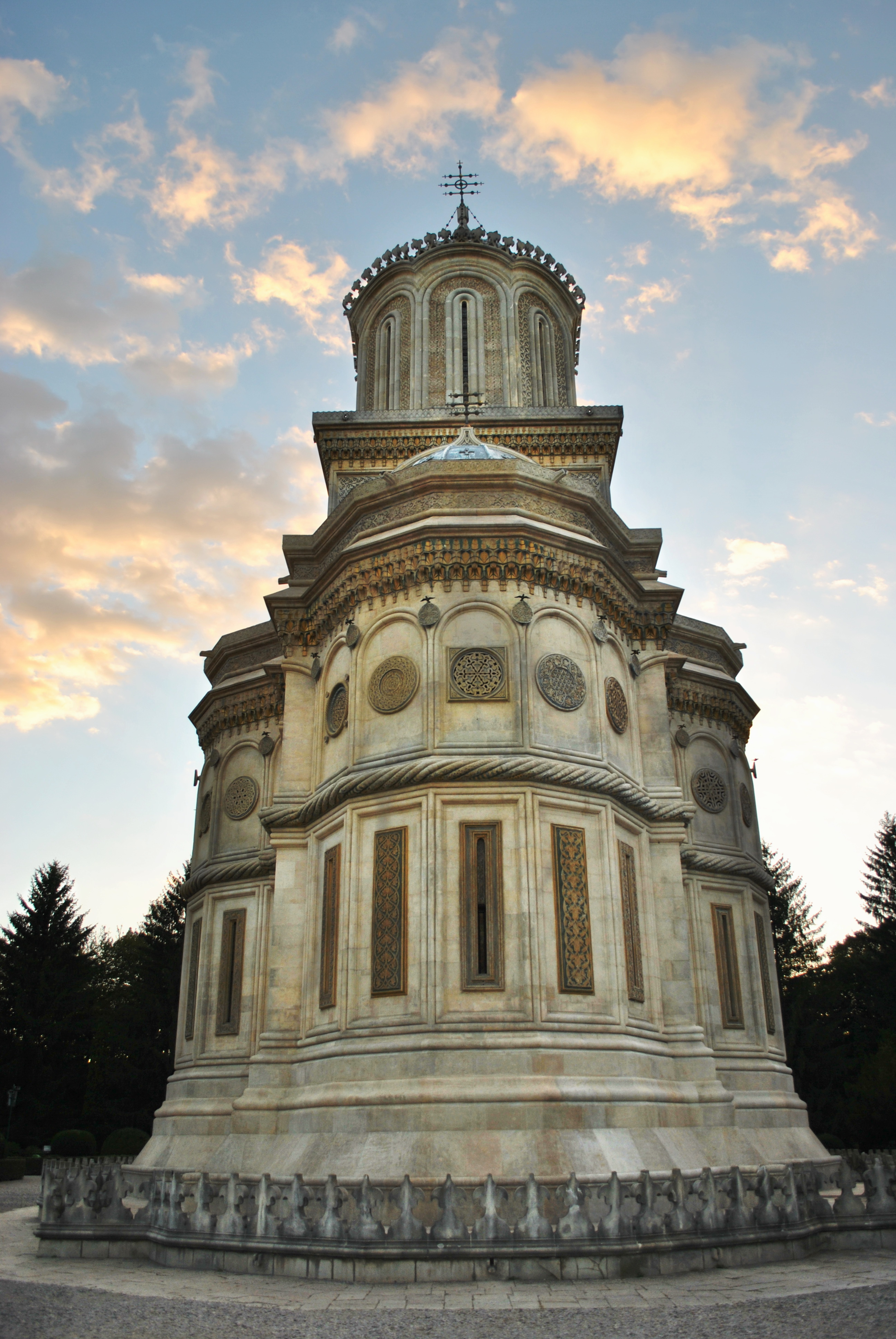
Back view

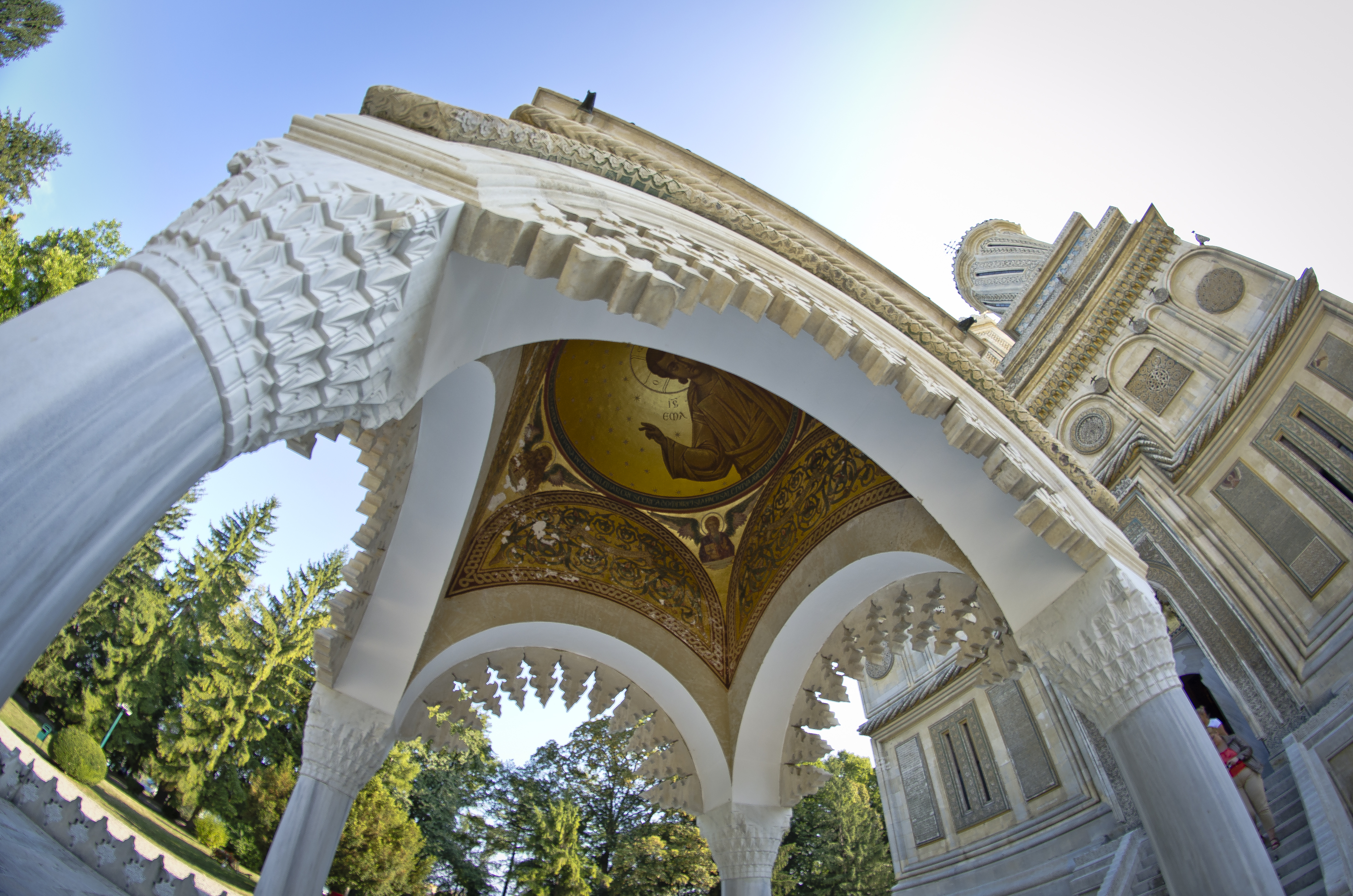
The aghiasmatar (holy water basin) pavilion in front of the Cathedral

The building resembles a very large and elaborate mausoleum, and was built in the Byzantine architectural style, with arabesques. The cathedral sits upon a raised platform, 7 ft (2.1 m) above the surrounding grade, and encircled by a stone balustrade. In shape the structure is oblong, with a many-sided annex at the back.

A dome rises in the center, fronted by two smaller twisting and leaning cupolas, while a secondary dome, broader and loftier than the central one, springs from the annex. Each summit is crowned by an inverted pear-shaped stone, bearing a triple cross, emblematic of the Trinity.

The windows are mere slits; those of the tambours (the cylinders on which the cupolas rest) are curved and slant at an angle of 70 degrees, as though the tambours were leaning to one side.

Between the pediment and the cornice a thick corded moulding is carried round the main building. Above this comes a row of circular shields, adorned with intricate arabesques, while bands and wreaths of lilies are everywhere sculptured on the windows, balconies, tambours and cornices, adding lightness to the fabric.

Facing the main entrance is a small open shrine, consisting of a cornice and dome upheld by four pillars.

== Inscriptions ==
The archives of the cathedral were plundered by Hungarian and Ottoman troops, but several inscriptions, Greek, Slavic, and Romanian, are left.

One tablet records that the founders were Prince Neagoe Basarab (1512–1521) and his wife Milica Despina of Wallachia; another that Prince, Radu of Afumați completed the work in 1526; a third describes the repairs executed in 1681 by Prince Șerban Cantacuzino; a fourth, the restoration, in 1804, by Joseph, the first bishop. Between 1875 and 1885 the cathedral was reconstructed, and in 1886 it was reconsecrated.

== Legends ==
Legends of Curtea de Argeș have inspired many Romanian poets, among them the celebrated Vasile Alecsandri. One traditional legend describes how Neagoe Basarab, while a hostage in Constantinople, designed a splendid mosque for the sultan, returning to build the cathedral out of the surplus materials.

Manole legend

A legend tells of Radu Negru employing a Meșterul Manole or Manoli as architect. With Manole being unable to finish the walls, the prince threatened him and his assistants with death. At last Manole suggested that they should follow the ancient custom of placing a living woman into the foundations; and that she who first appeared on the following morning should be the victim. The other masons warned their families, and Manole was forced to sacrifice his own wife. Thus the cathedral was built.

When Manole and his masons told the prince that they could always build an even greater building, Radu Negru had them stranded on the roof so that they could not build something to match it. They fashioned wooden wings and tried to fly off the roof, but, one by one, they all fell to the ground. A spring of clear water, named after Manole, is said to mark the spot where he fell.

This motif is widespread in South-East Europe, most notably also in Russia, like the blinding of the Masons of Saint Basil's Cathedral by Ivan the Terrible.

== Burials ==
- Neagoe Basarab V, Reigning Prince of Wallachia
- Despina, Princess Consort of Wallachia
- Petru, Prince of Wallachia
- Ion, Prince of Wallachia
- Anghelina, Princess of Wallachia
- Stana, Princess of Wallachia and Princess Consort of Moldavia, wife of Stephen IV of Moldavia
- Radu V, Reigning Prince of Wallachia
- Ruxandra, Princess of Moldavia and Princess Consort of Wallachia, wife of Radu V of Wallachia
- (1914) Carol I, King of Romania (1839–1914)
- (1916) Elisabeth, Queen of Romania (1843–1916), widow of Carol I, King of Romania
- (1916) Maria, Princess of Romania (1870–1874), daughter of Carol I, King of Romania
- (1927) Ferdinand I, King of Romania (1865–1927), nephew of Carol I, King of Romania
- (1938) Marie, Queen of Romania (1875–1938), widow of Ferdinand I, King of Romania
- (2016) Anne, Queen of Romania (1923–2016), wife of Michael I, King of Romania
- (2017) Michael I, King of Romania (1921–2017), son of Carol II, King of Romania
- (2019) Carol II, King of Romania (1893–1953), son of Ferdinand I, King of Romania
- (2019) Helen, Queen Mother of Romania (1896–1982), mother of Michael I, King of Romania
- (2019) Mircea, Prince of Romania (1913–1916), son of Ferdinand I, King of Romania
- (2024) Nicholas, Prince Regent of Romania (1903–1978), son of Ferdinand I, King of Romania
- (2024) Ioana, Princess of Romania (1910–1963), first wife of Nicholas, Prince Regent of Romania

On 16 December 2017, former king Michael I was buried here with a state funeral, his remains joining those of his wife Anne, who had died in 2016. Those attending the funeral included Carl XVI Gustaf of Sweden and Queen Silvia, Juan Carlos I of Spain and Queen Sofia, Charles, Prince of Wales, Henri, Grand Duke of Luxembourg, and Princess Astrid and Prince Lorenz of Belgium.

The remains of Helen, the mother of King Michael, were returned to Romania from the Bois-de-Vaux Cemetery in Switzerland on 18 October 2019. They were interred in the cathedral on 19 October.

Carol II's third wife Princess Elena of Romania was buried in the monastery's cemetery, rather than in the Royal Chapel.

== Gallery ==
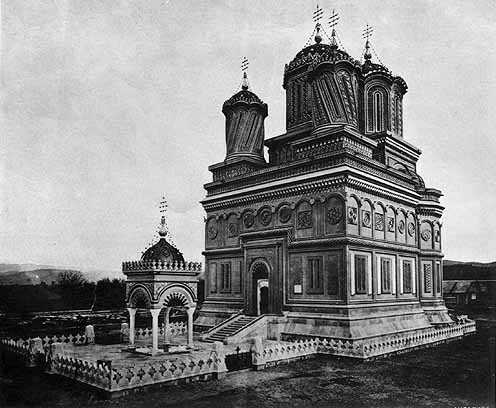
1880 photo
