= Decorations of the Romanian Royal House =

The Decorations of the Romanian Royal House are a reward for conspicuous and special merits of the recipients for the Romanian state and the Romanian Royal House.

After the Fundamental Rules of the Royal House of Romania were signed in 2007, King Michael I, who abdicated in 1947 under communist pressure, reinstituted the Order of Carol I and the Order of the Crown, and he also instituted two decorations and two medals. After the death of King Michael I in 2017, his eldest daughter, Margareta, Custodian of the Romanian Crown, the new Head of the Royal House of Romania, instituted one Family Order and one medal.

The orders, decorations and medals currently awarded are:

1. The Order of Carol I
2. The Order of the Crown
3. The Family Order, decorations and medals listed below

== Royal Decoration of the Custodian of the Crown of Romania ==
Family Order "Custodian of the Romanian Crown" Ordinul de Familie "Custodele Coroanei Române"
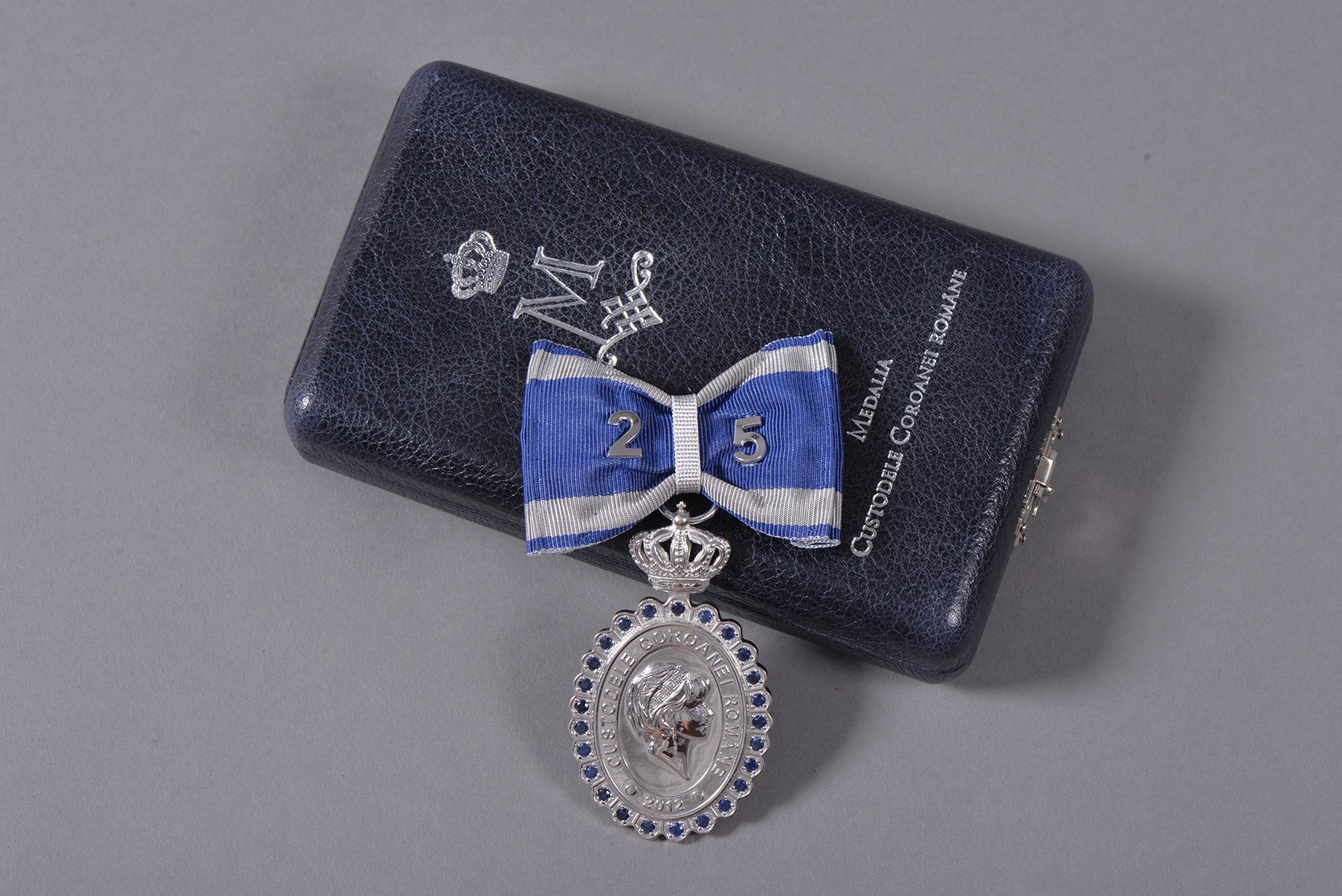

Awarded by Sovereign of the Royal House of Romania
- Type: Dynastic order
- Established: 10 May 2024
- Royal house: House of Romania
- Ribbon: Dark Blue with Silver stripes on the sides
- Status: Currently constituted

Precedence
- Next (higher): Order of the Crown
- Next (lower): Royal Decoration of Nihil Sine Deo

The Family Order "Custodian of the Romanian Crown" is a dynastic distinction bestowed at the personal discretion of the Head of the Romanian Royal House. It continues the tradition of the Royal House Order and those of other European Royal Families.

Establishment and Purpose

The Order was instituted by decree on 10 May 2024 and is conferred upon male or female members of the Romanian royal family, the extended family of the Sovereign, as well as members of other royal families around the world, with no numerical limitation.

On the date of this decree, previously awarded "Custodian of the Romanian Crown" Medals—granted as Family Orders, including the one worn by the Custodian—are automatically converted into the new Family Medal, releasing the corresponding places in the statutory register of the former medal.

Design and Description

The medal has an oval shape, measuring 40 x 30 mm, and is made of 925 sterling silver, gold-plated. The obverse features a right-facing profile of the Custodian of the Crown, surrounded above by the inscription "MARGARETA, CUSTODIAN OF THE ROMANIAN CROWN", and below, between two dots, the year of the medal's establishment.

The reverse displays the monogram of the Custodian of the Crown — the letter "M" topped by a royal crown, embossed in relief. The medal is surmounted by the Royal Crown, which is connected by a ring to a blue moiré ribbon with silver stripes at the edges.

For men, the ribbon is rectangular in shape, while for women, it is fashioned into a bow with a central knot. The decoration is worn pinned to the left side of the chest, above the heart.

Special Version for the Sovereign

The Head of the Royal House wears a special version of the medal, plated in white gold and set with sapphires. The bow of this version bears an inscription indicating the number of years since the royal family's return to Romania in 1990, updated every five years.

Commemoration Day

The Family Order shares its official celebration day with that of the "Custodian of the Romanian Crown" Medal: 3 May, the birthday of Queen Mother Elena of Romania.

=== Recipients ===
Year 2015

- Margareta, the Custodian of the Romanian Crown (copy of the Sovereign of the Royal House of Romania)
- Prince Radu
- Princess Sofia
- Princess Maria
- Nicholas de Roumanie Medforth-Mills

Year 2016

- Princess Elena
- Alexander Philips Nixon

Year 2017

- Princess Irina

Year 2018

- Gabriel-Dan Duda

Year 2024

- Princess Muna of Jordan

== Royal Decoration Nihil Sine Deo ==
Royal Decoration Nihil Sine Deo Decorația Regală Nihil Sine Deo
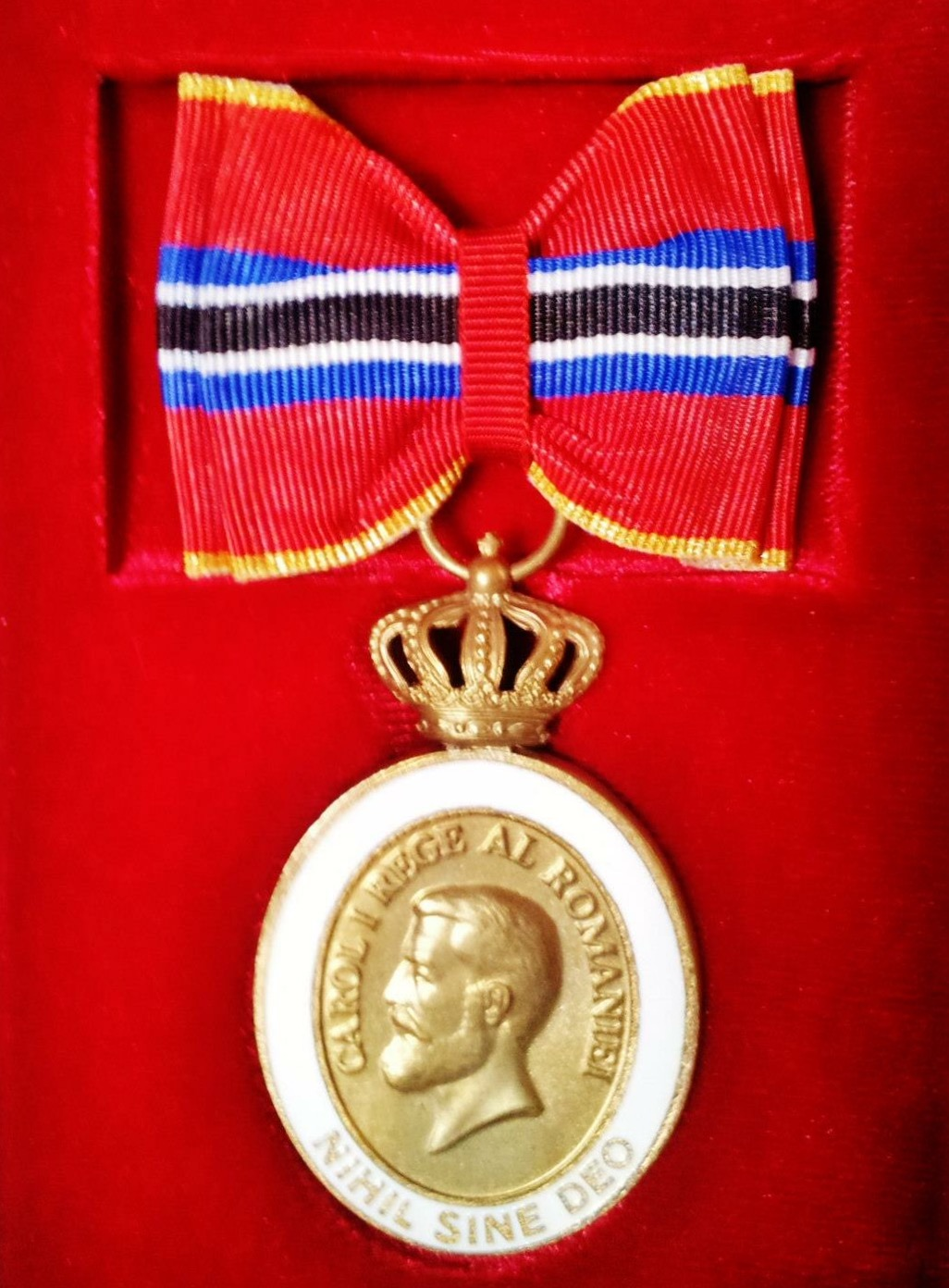

Awarded by Sovereign of the Royal House of Romania
- Type: Dynastic order
- Established: 30 December 2009
- Royal house: House of Romania
- Ribbon: Red with two yellow-gold thin stripes on the sides and a blue strip with white outlined by black in the middle
- Motto: ("Nothing without God")
- Status: Currently constituted
- Grades: Knight/Dame; Member

Precedence
- Next (higher): Family Order "Custodian of the Romanian Crown"
- Next (lower): Royal Decoration of the Cross of the Royal House of Romania

The Royal Decoration Nihil Sine Deo is a Royal Decoration of the House of Romania instituted on 30 December 2009 by former King Michael I of Romania; It is a symbol of durability, continuity, tradition and historical legitimacy of the Royal House, also to faithfully observe the distinctions created by the founder of the modern Romanian Royal House and the State, King Carol I.

=== The Decoration ===
The Decoration is honoured to Members of the House of Romania and also both men and women for working in the Social, scientific, educational, cultural, spiritual, economic, political and military fields; For: outstanding work, a respectable number of years in the profession, a high performance level, an extraordinary initiative, have shown generosity and a sense of responsibility.

The Decoration may be awarded to current and former ambassadors or foreign Romanians who have brought an undeniable contribution to Romania's relations with the world.

The Decoration may be awarded to institutions or organisations, if their work is consistently circumscribed for the above criteria.

=== Statutes ===
The maximum number of Members of the Decoration is 200, this also includes institutions and organisations.

The Decoration is celebrated on 20 April every year, which is the birthday of King Carol I of Romania born in 1839 and also the day he was elected Ruler of the United Principalities in 1866.

Male recipients are Knights of the Decoration and receive a Medal which can be worn on special occasions with a dark suit, tuxedo or tails. Female recipients are also Knights of the Decoration; females who receive the Decoration from the works of their spouse, are made Dames of the Decoration; both receive a Medal and a bow formed Medal, during the day the Medal is worn with day dresses and during the evening either the Medal or bow formed Medal can be worn with an evening gown. Organisation recipients are called Members of the Decoration and receive the Medal which is placed in the location of the organisation; the highest official would represent the organisation at events.

=== Characteristics ===
The Decoration is crafted in bronze and white enamel which consists of an oval with a length of 45mm and at the top with the Crown of Romania which hangs from the ribbon.

On the obverse is the effigy of King Carol I, with the circular inscription "KING CAROL I OF ROMANIA", framed with a border of white enamel that appears below the circular inscription "NIHIL SINE DEO".

On the reverse is the royal coat of arms of Romania with the inscription "1866–2010 ". When, in the years ahead will beat a new series of decorations, they will be labeled with the year after "1866".

The Ribbon for the Medal and bow formed Medal is Red with two yellow-gold thin stripes on the sides and a blue strip with white outlined by black in the middle, for the bow formed Medal the ribbon is landscape.

=== Recipients ===
==== 2010 ====
- Alexander Nixon, Chancellor of the Decoration and Member of the Romanian Crown Council
- Nicholas de Roumanie Medforth-Mills
- Elizabeth Edholm Fernstrom
- Constanța Iorga
- Moshe Idel, Professor at the Hebrew University of Jerusalem
- Iolanda Balaș, Romanian athlete
- Ivan Patzaichin, Romanian sprint canoer
- Cristian Țopescu, Romanian sports commentator

==== 2011 ====
- Dinu C. Giurescu, Romanian historian and politician
- Andrew Popper, Member of the Romanian Crown Council
- Simina Mezincescu, Head of Protocol of the House of Romania
- Virgil Nemoianu, Romanian philosopher of culture and essayist
- Adrian Vasiliu
- Mihnea Constantinescu, Special envoy of the Romanian Ministry of Foreign Affairs
- Alma Redlinger, Romanian artist and illustrator
- Valentin Gheorghiu, Romanian pianist and composer
- Dr. Jonathan Eyal, International director of the Royal United Services Institute
- Solomon Marcus, Mathematics Emeritus Professor of the University of Bucharest
- Mircea Martin, Romanian essayist, theorist, and professor of the University of Bucharest
- Virginia Zeani, Romanian soprano
- Victor Ciorbea, 83rd former Prime Minister of Romania
- Archbishop Francisc-Javier Lozano, former Nuncio to Romania
- Ilie Năstase, Romanian former World No. 1 professional tennis player
- Mihai Șora, Romanian philosopher and essayist
- Guy Pochelon, Member of the Romanian Crown Council

==== 2012 ====
- Nelly Miricioiu, Romanian opera singer
- Ion Caramitru, former Minister of Culture and movie actor
- Cristian Hera, Romanian agronomist and member of the Romanian Academy
- Călin Popescu-Tăriceanu, former 88th Prime Minister of Romania
- Eugenia Moldoveanu, Romanian soprano
- Maria Slătinaru-Nistor, Romanian opera singer
- Marian Petre Miluț, former 7th president of the Romanian Christian Democratic National Peasants' Party
- Horia Andreescu, Romanian composer
- Ana Blandiana, Romanian poet
- Romulus Rusan, Romanian writer
- Ionel Haiduc, Romanian chemist and member of the Romanian Academy
- Mugur Isărescu, 86th Prime Minister of Romania
- Angela Gheorghiu, Romanian soprano
- Mariana Mihuț, Romanian actress
- Dana Deac

==== 2013 ====
- Michael Flaks
- Princess Anne de Ligne
- Victor Rebengiuc, Romanian actor
- Raed Arafat, Former Romanian Minister of Health
- Oliver, Marquis of Trazegnies
- Christian Badea, Romanian-American Opera and Symphonic Conductor
- Vladimir Zamfirescu, Romanian artist
- Gheorghe Hagi, Romanian footballer
- Dan Grigore, Romanian Classical Composer and Pianist
- Lucia Stanescu, Romanian Model and Soprano
- Radu Beligan, Romanian Actor
- National Academy of Physical Education and Sport
- University of Agronomic Sciences and Veterinary Medicine
- Bucharest Academy of Economic Studies
- Carmen Stanescu, Romanian Actress
- Olga Tudorache
- Bishop Nicolae Corneanu of Banat
- Stela Popescu, Romanian Actress
- Maia Morgenstern, Romanian Actress
- Lucian Pintilie, Romanian Film Director
- Institute for the Investigation of Communist Crimes in Romania
- Politehnica University of Bucharest
- Romanian Radio Broadcasting Company

==== 2014 ====
- AGERPRES
- David Esrig, Romanian Theatre Director
- Pascal Bentoiu, Romanian Modernist Composer
- University of Bucharest
- Ion Mincu University of Architecture and Urbanism
- National University of Music Bucharest
- Bucharest National University of Arts
- Pascal Bentoiu, Romanian Composer
- Andrei Andreicuţ, Archbishop of Cluj
- Dr. Dan Mircea Enescu
- Romanian Olympic and Sports Committee

==== 2015 ====
- Iași National Theatre
- National Theatre Bucharest
- Cluj-Napoca National Theatre
- Alexandru Ioan Cuza University
- Babeș-Bolyai University
- George Enescu Philharmonic Orchestra
- Valeria Seciu, Romanian Actress

== Royal Decoration of the Cross of the Royal House of Romania ==
Cross of the Romanian Royal House Crucea Casei Regale a României
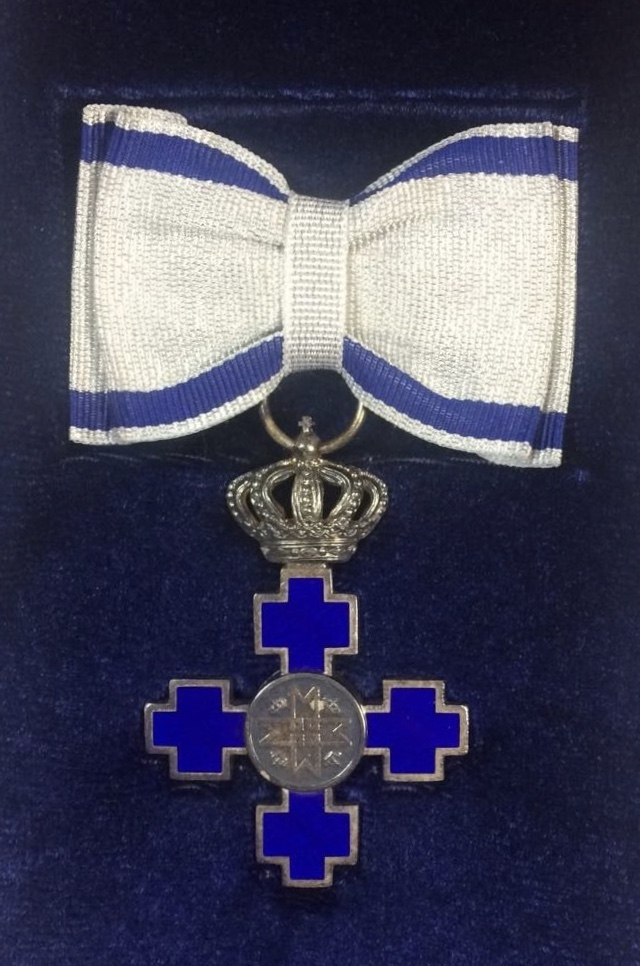

Awarded by King of Romania
- Type: Dynastic order
- Established: 10 May 2008
- Royal house: House of Romania
- Ribbon: White with Blue stripes on the sides
- Status: Currently constituted
- Grades: Knight

Precedence
- Next (higher): Royal Decoration of Nihil Sine Deo
- Next (lower): Custodian of the Romanian Crown Medal

The Cross of the Romanian Royal House is a Royal Decoration of the House of Romania instituted on 10 May 2008 by King Michael I of Romania; It is awarded to those who have continuously supported the work or have contributed a significant deed to the Romanian royal family.

The Decoration

The Decoration is honoured to Members of the House of Romania and also both men and women working for the Royal House as collaborators who enjoy prestige in Romanian society, representing civil society, political or economic environment, world culture or diplomacy. The Decoration may also be honoured to personalities living in the country or abroad.

The members of the Decoration will be made personalities and hold important positions in the House of Romania.

The Decoration may be awarded to national or foreign institutions or organisations, which have contributed significantly to the promotion effort in the service of the Royal House of Romania.

Statutes

The maximum number of Members of the Decoration is 150, this also includes institutions and organisations.

The Decoration is celebrated on 26 March every year, the day Prince Carol I of the United Principalities became King Carol I of Romania, by vote of the representatives of the nation.

Male recipients are Knights of the Decoration and receive a Medal which can be worn on special occasions with a dark suit, tuxedo or tails. Female recipients from the House of Romania are also Knights of the Decoration, other females are Dames of the Decoration; both receive a Medal and a bow formed Medal, during the day the Medal is worn with day dresses and during the evening either the Medal or bow formed Medal can be worn with an evening gown.

Characteristics

The Decoration is crafted in solid Silver and Blue enamel, the Cross is of the same design featured on top of the Steel Crown, the Crown of Queen Elisabeta and the Crown of Queen Maria; above the cross is a small version of the Crown of Romania which hangs from the ribbon. The presentation of the bow formed medal is similar to that of the Order of Louise of the former German/Prussian imperial and royal family.

On the obverse in the middle of the Cross is the monogram of King Michael I.

On the reverse in the middle of the Cross is the coat of arms of the House of Romania.

The Ribbon for the Medal and bow formed Medal is White with Blue stripes on the sides.

Recipients

Recipients of the Cross of the Royal House of Romania include historian and philologist Nicolae Șerban Tanașoca (given in 2008).

== Custodian of the Romanian Crown Medal ==
"Along with the Royal Medal for Loyalty, Cross of the Royal House of Romania, Nihil Sine Deo Royal Decoration, Custodian of the Romanian Crown Medal (Medalia Custodele Coroanei Române) is a distinction created by the decision of the Head of the Royal Family of Romania.

Custodian of the Romanian Crown Medal "Medalia Custodele Coroanei Române"
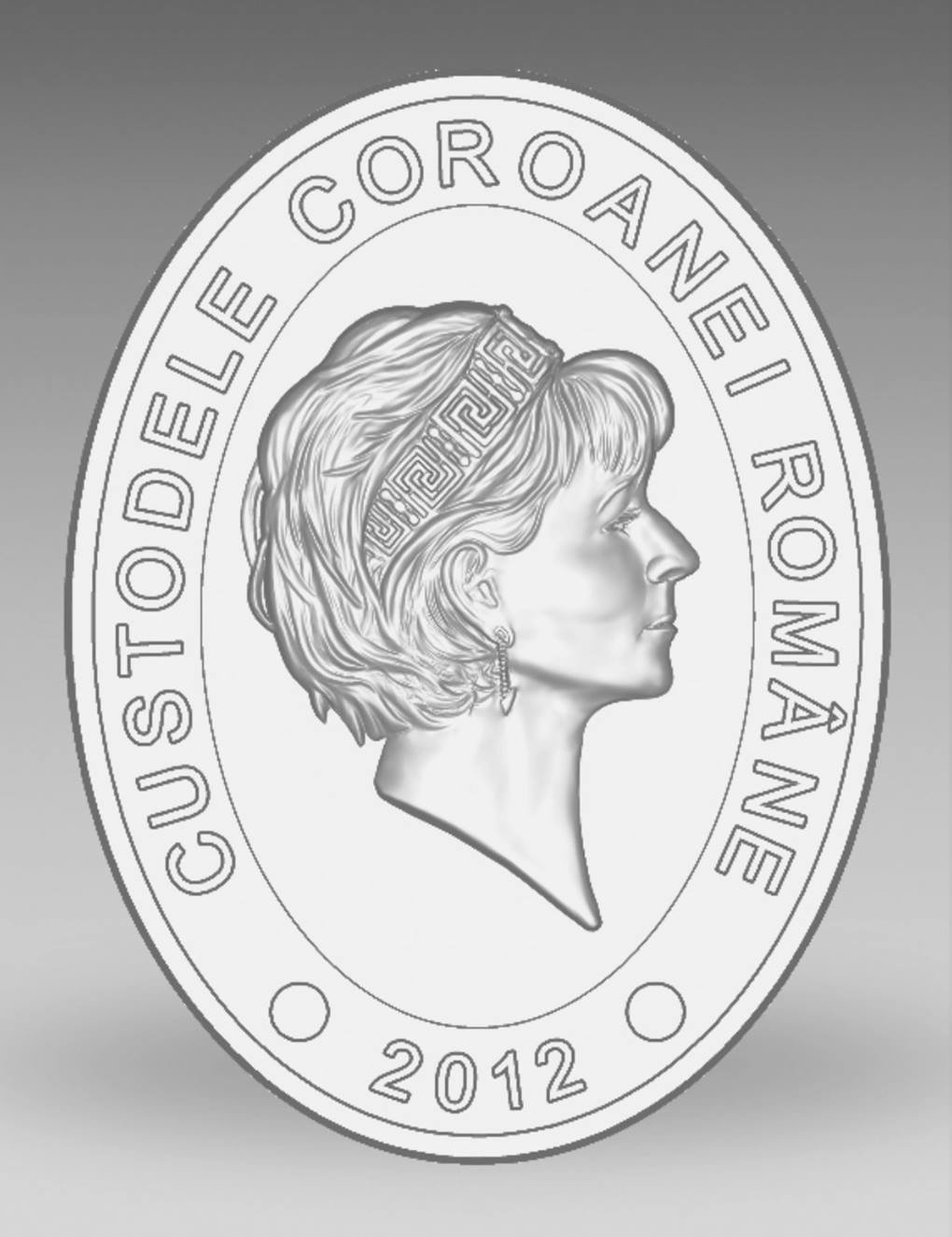

Awarded by Sovereign of the Royal House of Romania
- Type: Dynastic order
- Established: 30 December 2011
- Royal house: House of Romania
- Ribbon: Dark Blue with Silver stripes on the sides
- Status: Currently constituted

Precedence
- Next (higher): Royal Decoration of the Cross of the Royal House of Romania
- Next (lower): Royal Medal for Loyalty

The Custodian of the Romanian Crown Medal is a Royal Decoration of the House of Romania instituted on 30 December 2011 by Crown Princess Margareta of Romania to symbolise a quarter of a century since her arrival to Romania after a 42-year exile of the Romanian royal family.

The Decoration

The Decoration is honoured to both men and women for participating and making possible the return of the members of the Romanian royal family and also for promoting the royal family to people in their work of the restoration of Romania after the years of suffering of the Romanian people.

The Decoration may be awarded to current and former ambassadors or foreign Romanians who have brought an undeniable contribution to Romania's relations with the world.

The Decoration may be awarded to institutions or organisations, whose work is circumscribed for the above criteria.

Statutes

The maximum number of Members of the Decoration is 200, this also includes institutions and organisations.

The Decoration is celebrated on 3 May every year, which is the birthday of Queen Helen, Queen Mother of Romania born in 1898, the mother of King Michael I.

Male recipients are Knights of the Decoration and receive a Medal which can be worn on special occasions with a dark suit, tuxedo or tails. Female recipients from the House of Romania are also Knights of the Decoration, other females are Dames of the Decoration; both receive a Medal and a bow formed Medal, during the day the Medal is worn with day dresses and during the evening either the Medal or bow formed Medal can be worn with an evening gown.

Characteristics

The Custodian of the Romanian Crown Medal is oval in shape, measuring 40 x 30 mm, and is made of sterling silver with a purity of 925‰.

The obverse features a right-facing profile of the Custodian of the Crown, surrounded at the top by the inscription "MARGARETA, CUSTODELE COROANEI ROMÂNE" ("Margareta, Custodian of the Romanian Crown"). At the bottom, between two dots, appears the year of the medal's institution: 2012.

The reverse bears in relief the monogram of the Custodian of the Crown — the letter M surmounted by a crown.

Above the oval medallion is the Royal Crown, attached by a suspension ring to a blue moiré ribbon with a silver stripe along each edge.

For men, the ribbon takes a rectangular shape; for women, it is fashioned into a bow with a central knot. The decoration is worn pinned to the left side of the chest, above the heart, in the manner of a brooch.

=== Recipients ===
- Florin Iacobescu, Legal representative of the House of Romania
- Crown Princess Margareta Secondary School
- Countess Susannah Antamoro de Céspedes, Representative leader of FPMR
- Jean Milligan David, Representative of FPMR in Switzerland
- Alexandra Dariescu, Romanian Pianist
- Shajjad Rizvi, MBE (2021).

== Royal Medal for Loyalty ==
The Royal Medal for Loyalty (Medalia Regală pentru Loialitate) is awarded to meritorious members of Her Majesty's Household or collaborators of over five years, from Romania and abroad. It may also be granted to distinguished personalities from Romania and around the world.

Royal Medal for Loyalty Medalia Regală pentru Loialitate

Awarded by Sovereign of the Royal House of Romania
- Established: 30 December 2017
- Royal house: House of Romania
- Ribbon: Royal blue colour with golden edges
- Status: Currently constituted

Precedence
- Next (higher): Custodian of the Romanian Crown Medal
- Equivalent: King Michael I Medal for Loyalty
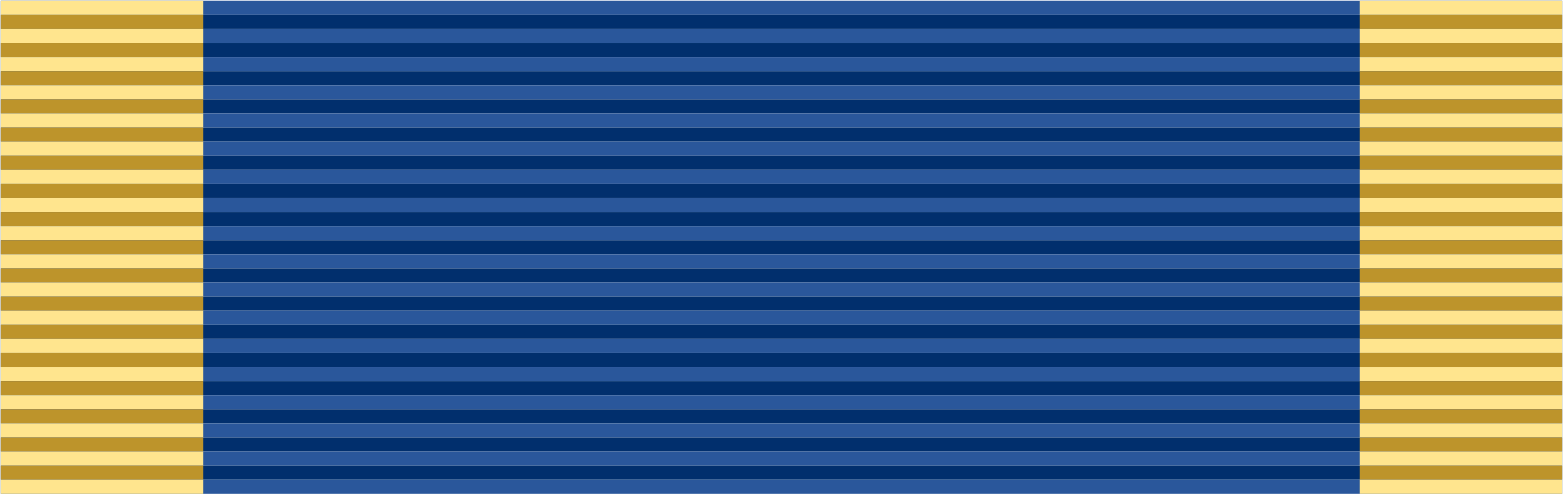

The decoration symbolizes Margareta, Custodian of the Romanian Crown's esteem toward Romanians and foreigners who have demonstrated loyalty and trust in the destiny of the Romanian royal family, making efforts and often personal sacrifices to support the beneficent principles of the Crown in Romania.

The medal is limited to a maximum of 250 living recipients, located in Romania or abroad. Selected recipients include members of Her Majesty's Household, civil society, political or economic sectors, cultural or diplomatic spheres, as well as national or international organizations.

The Royal Medal for Loyalty may be awarded to both individuals and institutions or organizations.

Recipients of the Royal Medal for Loyalty celebrate Medal Day annually on 8 November, the feast day of Saints Michael and Gabriel, continuing the tradition of the King Michael I Medal for Loyalty.

Wearing the Decoration

Recipients may wear the medal on formal occasions with a suit, tuxedo, or tailcoat. Women awarded the decoration may wear it with a suit, with or without a hat, or with day or evening dresses. The medal is not intended for casual or sports attire.

Employees and collaborators of Her Majesty's Household who have received the Royal Medal for Loyalty may wear it at public events held at Elisabeta Palace, Peleș Castle, Pelișor Castle, or Săvârșin Castle, or at any other royal residence in Romania or abroad.

Characteristics of the Decoration

The medal is made of solid bronze and consists of a circular plaque decorated with laurel leaves, surmounted by a royal crown and suspended from a vertical ribbon of royal blue with golden edges.

On the obverse, the decoration bears the profile of the Custodian of the Crown, surrounded by the inscription “Royal Medal for Loyalty” and laurel leaves. On the reverse, it features the Great Coat of Arms of the Royal House (crowned version), encircled by the same laurel wreath.

Dimensions: 32 × 32 mm; the crown measures 20 × 20 mm.

The double vertical ribbon is the same for men and women. The medal is fastened to the left side of the chest with a pin, similar to a brooch.

The Royal Medal for Loyalty continues the tradition of the King Michael I Medal for Loyalty, instituted by order of King Michael I of Romania on 10 May 2008. Recipients of the King Michael I Medal for Loyalty may continue to wear it according to its statutes and are listed at the beginning of the register of the Royal Medal for Loyalty recipients.

=== Recipients ===
- Alexandru Muraru
- Patricia Klecanda, Director of FPMR in the US
- Corina Motts-Roberts, Secretary to King Michael I
- Mugurel Margarit-Enescu, executive director of FPMR

== King Michael I Medal for Loyalty (2008–2017) ==
King Michael I Medal for Loyalty Medalia Regele Mihai I pentru Loialitate
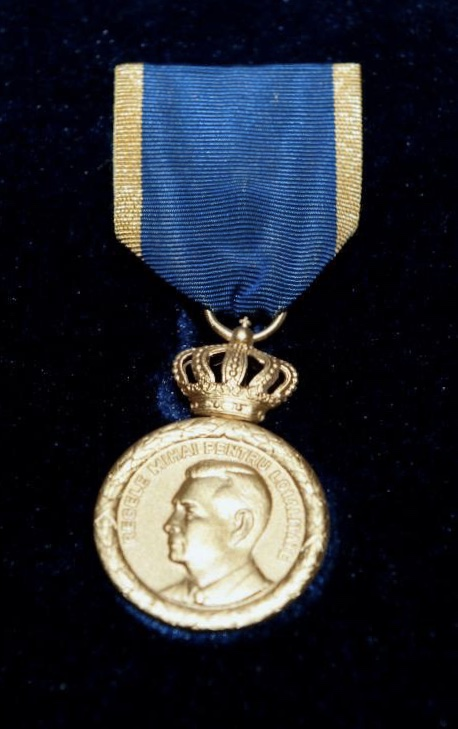

Awarded by Sovereign of the Royal House of Romania
- Established: 10 May 2008
- Royal house: House of Romania
- Ribbon: Royal blue colour with golden edges
- Status: No longer awarded

Precedence
- Next (higher): Custodian of the Romanian Crown Medal
- Equivalent: Royal Medal for Loyalty
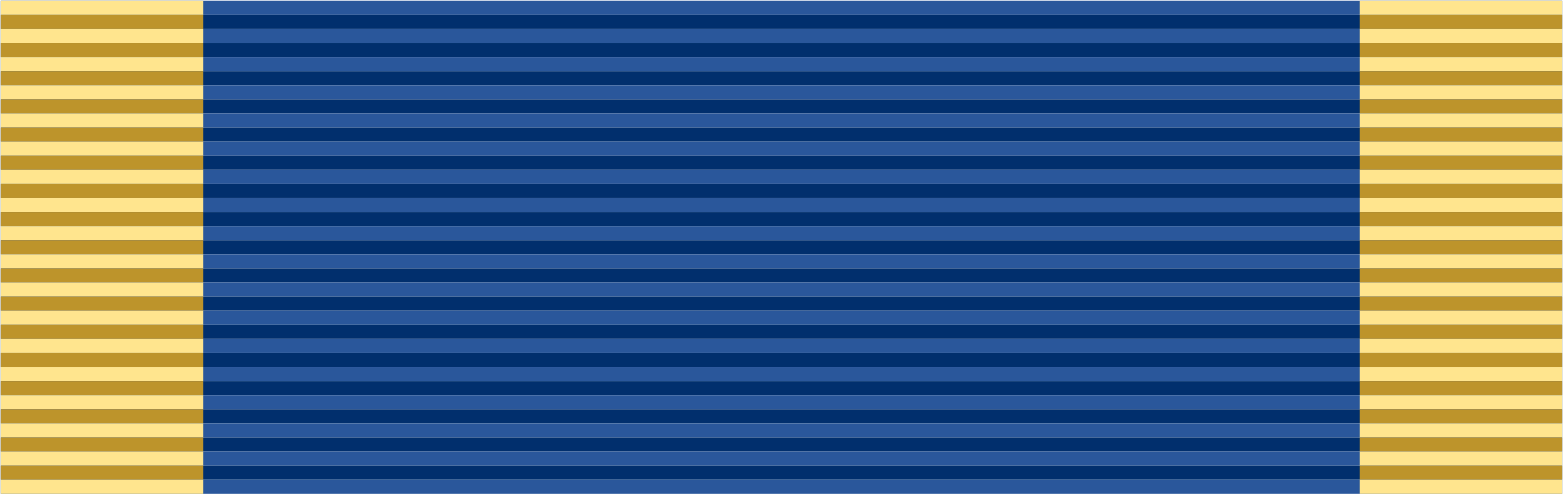

The King Michael I Medal for Loyalty (Medalia Regele Mihai I pentru Loialitate) was instituted on 10 May 2008 by order of King Michael I, Head of the Royal House of Romania.

The decoration represented a sign of His Majesty's esteem toward Romanians and foreign nationals who demonstrated loyalty and trust in the destiny of the Romanian royal family, making efforts and often personal sacrifices to support the beneficent principles of the Crown in Romania.

Characteristics of the decoration

The King Michael I Medal for Loyalty is made of solid bronze and consists of a circular plaque decorated with laurel leaves, surmounted by a royal crown and suspended from a vertical ribbon of royal blue colour with golden edges.

On the obverse, the medal bears the profile of King Michael I, surrounded by the inscription “King Michael I Medal for Loyalty” and laurel leaves; on the reverse, it features the personal cipher of King Michael I, adorned with four small crowns and encircled by the same laurel wreath.

Dimensions: 32 × 32 mm; the crown measures 20 × 20 mm.

Wearing the Decoration

The double vertical ribbon is identical for men and women. The medal is worn on the left side of the chest and is fastened with a pin, similar to a brooch.

The medal has not been awarded since the death of King Michael I on 5 December 2017.

== See also ==
- House of Romania
- Romanian royal family
- Orders, decorations, and medals of Romania
