= Robin Medforth-Mills =

British academic (1942–2002)

- Born: Leslie Robin Medforth-Mills; 8 December 1942; Sproatley, East Riding of Yorkshire, England
- Died: 2 February 2002 (aged 59); Geneva, Switzerland
- Spouse: Princess Elena of Romania (m. 1983; div. 1991)
- Children: Nicholas de Roumanie-Medforth-Mills; Karina de Roumanie-Medforth-Mills
- Parents: Cyril Mills (father); Nora Medforth (mother)

Leslie Robin Medforth-Mills (8 December 1942 – 2 February 2002) was a British professor of Geography at the University of Durham and a United Nations official.

== Family ==
Medforth-Mills was the son of Cyril Mills (1908–1989) and Nora Medforth (1909–1990).

He married Princess Elena of Romania at a civil ceremony on 20 July 1983 in Durham, England, which was followed by a religious ceremony on 24 September 1983 at the Greek Orthodox Church in Lausanne, Switzerland.

The family lived at Flass Hall, Esh Winning, Durham, a Grade II listed residence. The couple divorced on 28 November 1991 in Sutherland, Scotland, after having two children, Nicholas Michael de Roumanie Medforth-Mills (b. 1 April 1985), and Elisabeta Karina de Roumanie Medforth-Mills (b. 4 January 1989), whose godmother was the novelist Dame Catherine Cookson.

== Education ==
Medforth-Mills was educated at South Holderness County Secondary School near Preston, in the East Riding of Yorkshire, where in 1960 he was Head Boy. He graduated from Durham University with a BA degree in Geography. He subsequently obtained a PhD degree, and later became a professor of geography at Durham.

== Career ==
He was a lecturer in Geography at Durham from 1974 to 1983 and subsequently a Research Fellow in the same subject from 1983 to 1990. In addition to his Geography work in Durham, he also worked for the United Nations system, serving as a UN expert in a manpower project implemented by the International Labour Organization in Sudan in the mid-1970s, in UNICEF in its fund-raising office in Geneva in the early 1990s, and later in its humanitarian operations in northern Iraq, in the mid-1990s after the first Gulf War.

According to the security chief of the UNGCI, Poul Dahl, during that time Medforth-Mills was sexually harassing the male UN guards by offering them high-paying UN jobs in return for sex, and threatening them when they reported him.

He was later posted with UNICEF again in Geneva, and also briefly in New York in the late 1990s. For several years after the fall of the Ceauşescu regime, he was involved in efforts to bring humanitarian aid to institutionalised orphans and other destitute people in Romania, and was a founder-member of the North-East Relief Fund for Romania, set up with Princess Elena of Romania, and the then-Lord Mayor of Newcastle upon Tyne, Terry Cooney, and Harry Charrington.
