= Princess Sofia of Romania =

Romanian royal (born 1957)

Princess Sofia
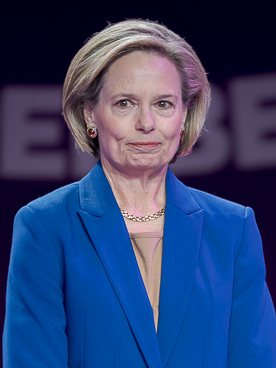
- Sofia in 2025
- Born: 29 October 1957 (age 68); Tatoi Palace, Athens, Greece
- Spouse: Alain Biarneix (m. 1998; div. 2002)
- Issue: Eelaz Biarneix
- House: Romania (since 2011); Hohenzollern-Sigmaringen (until 2011)
- Father: Michael I of Romania
- Mother: Anne of Bourbon-Parma

Princess Sofia of Romania (born 29 October 1957) is a Romanian photographer and member of the deposed Romanian royal family. She is the fourth daughter of Michael I, the last King of Romania, and Queen Anne. Since 2018, she has lived in Romania and has represented her elder sister, Margareta, Custodian of the Romanian Crown, at public engagements.

== Early life and education ==
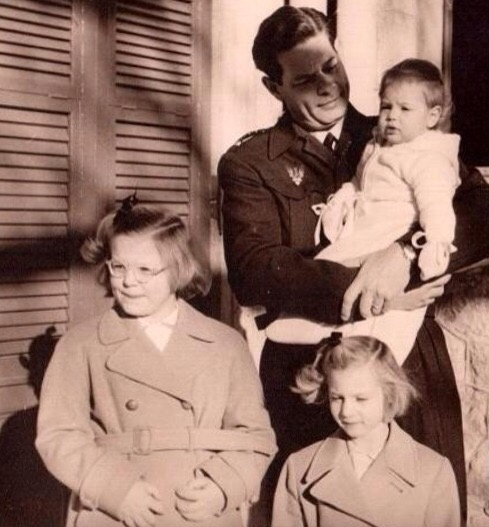
Sofia, held by her father, Michael I of Romania, with her older sisters Elena (left) and Irina (right), 1958.

Princess Sofia was born at Tatoi Palace, Greece, on 29 October 1957. She studied in Switzerland and the United Kingdom before moving to the United States, where she studied fine arts and photography at the University of North Carolina at Asheville. She later studied graphic design and photography at the Corcoran School of the Arts and Design in Washington, D.C.

Following the Romanian Revolution of December 1989, Sofia left the United States and returned to the royal family's residence in Versoix, Switzerland. There, she worked with her father and her sister Margareta in the royal secretariat. In January 1990, Sofia and Margareta made their first visit to Romania.

== Public activities ==
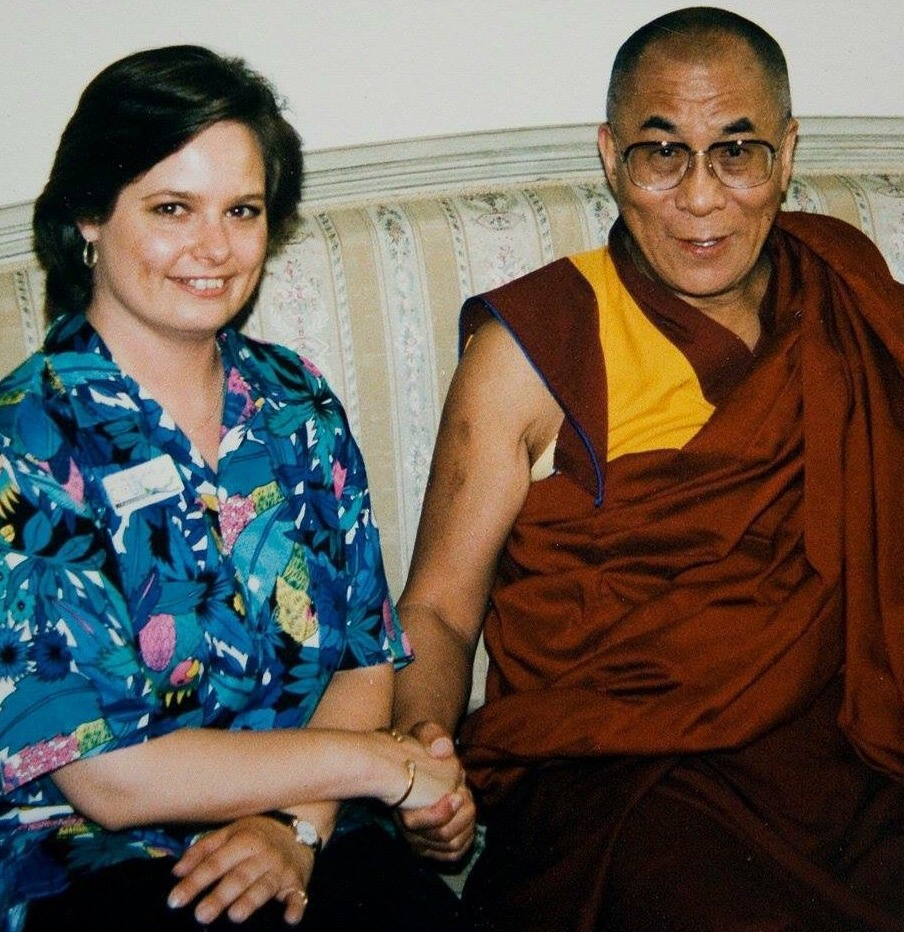
Sofia and the Dalai Lama, 1990

She has lived in Romania since 2018 and participates in cultural, educational and official public events. She is a member of the Royal Council and of the board of the Margareta of Romania Royal Foundation.

== Photography ==
Sofia has worked as a photographer and has exhibited her work in Romania and abroad. Her photography has focused particularly on landscapes, rural communities, religious life, cultural heritage and historic buildings.

In April 2017, her exhibition The Elements of Nature opened at the National Theatre Bucharest. It contained 50 landscape photographs taken in Brittany, France, during the preceding two years. The exhibition was accompanied by the publication of Ultramarine, a collection of 36 photographic postcards.

In 2017, she created the photographic project Romania, A Celebration, conceived as a series of books and exhibitions documenting Romania's cultural, rural and natural heritage.

One of the project's publications was the bilingual photographic album The Romanian Monastery: Celebrating Romania's Spiritual Communities, published in 2021. The album documented everyday life in several Romanian Orthodox monastic communities.

== Personal life ==
In 1998, Princess Sofia married Frenchman Alain Biarneix. The marriage ended in divorce in 2002. They have one child, Eelaz Biarneix, born in Argenteuil, France, on 15 August 1999. Eelaz was given the name Elisabeta-Maria at birth in honour of Romania's first two queens, Queen Elisabeth and Queen Marie. Princess Sofia and her child lived in France until 2018, when they moved to Romania.

== Publications ==
- Copilul Soarelui (The Child of the Sun), Dali Publishing, 1995 – a collection of children's stories.
- When Nature Calls, 2010 – a collection of nature photography.
- Along the Flowers' Way - Au fil des fleurs, 2010 – a bilingual collection combining flower photography with inspirational texts.
- Petit Clin d'Oeil Breton / A Small Wink from Brittany, 2011 – a photographic collection portraying Brittany, France.
- Portfolio, 2013 – a collection of photographs taken in the Mediterranean regions of France.
- The Book of Gifts, 2013 – a book reflecting on her experiences as a photographer.
- Ultramarine, Curtea Veche Publishing, 2017 – a collection of 36 photographic postcards.
- Mănăstirea română. Sărbătorind comunitățile spirituale ale României / The Romanian Monastery. Celebrating Romania's Spiritual Communities, Corint Publishing, 2021 – a bilingual photographic album documenting Romanian monastic communities.
- Calendar regal 2023 (Royal Calendar 2023), with Prince Radu of Romania, Curtea Veche Publishing, 2022 – featuring photographs taken by Princess Sofia.
- Din piatră și oțel. O călătorie în lumea Urbex / Of Stone and Steel. A Voyage into the World of Urbex, Curtea Veche Publishing, 2023 – a bilingual photographic album documenting abandoned historic and industrial buildings in Romania.
- Postcards - Inspirația mea (My Inspiration), Curtea Veche Publishing, 2026 – a collection of photographic postcards.

== Titles, styles and honours ==
=== Titles and styles ===
- 29 October 1957 – 10 May 2011: Her Royal Highness Princess Sofia of Romania, Princess of Hohenzollern-Sigmaringen
- 10 May 2011 – present: Her Royal Highness Princess Sofia of Romania

On 10 May 2011, King Michael I severed the Romanian Royal House's historical and dynastic links with the House of Hohenzollern-Sigmaringen. From that date, members of the Romanian royal family ceased using titles conferred by the princely House of Hohenzollern.

=== Honours ===
==== Dynastic ====
- House of Romania: Grand Cross of the Order of the Crown of Romania
- House of Romania: Recipient of the Family Order of the Custodian of the Romanian Crown

==== Ecclesiastical ====
- Order of Our Lady of Prayer (Romanian Orthodox Church)

=== Royal standard ===
Royal standard used by Princess Sofia

Princess Sofia uses the royal standard assigned to the royal princesses of Romania, which is also used by her sisters Princess Elena, Princess Irina and Princess Maria. The standard has a blue field and bears the lesser version of the Royal Arms of Romania at its centre.
