= Elisabeta Palace =

Heritage site in Bucharest, Romania

Elisabeta Palace Palatul Elisabeta
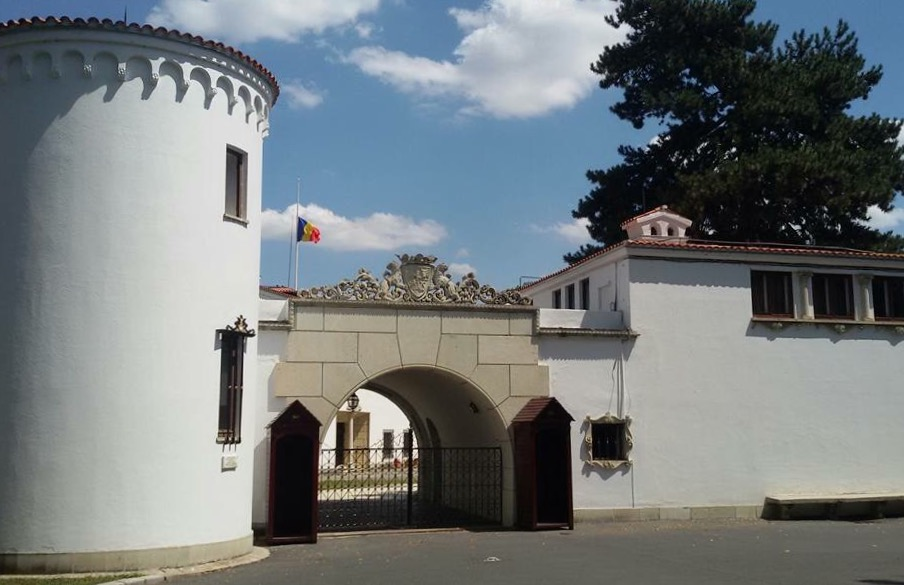

General information
- Architectural style: Moorish; Brancovan elements
- Location: 26 Kiseleff Road; Sector 1, Bucharest, Romania
- Coordinates: 44.470830°N 26.079720°E
- Current tenants: Official Romanian Residence of the Romanian Royal Family
- Construction started: 1936
- Completed: 1937
- Inaugurated: 19 December 1937
- Client: Princess Elisabeth of Romania

Design and construction
- Architects: Constantin Ionescu; Corneliu M. Marcu

Elisabeta Palace (Romanian: Palatul Elisabeta) is a palace on Kiseleff Road in Bucharest, Romania, which serves as an official residence of the former royal family of Romania.

The Palace was designed in 1935 by two architects named Constantin Ionescu and Corneliu Marcu and built in 1937 for Princess Elisabeth of Romania, the daughter of King Ferdinand I and his wife Queen Marie, and also the aunt of King Michael I, who was forced to abdicate on 30 December 1947.

In 2001, the Romanian Senate passed a bill awarding the Palace to the former king for use as a residence during his lifetime. Since then, members of the Royal Family have been living there. Foreign heads of state, royalty and politicians are received there, as well as Romanian political, cultural, economic and academic figures when special events are conducted.

== History ==
In July 1935, Princess Elisabeth, former Queen Consort of Greece, divorced her second cousin, the deposed King George II of Greece. After her divorce, she moved to Romania, where she stayed at Banloc Castle.

For Elisabeth, the Palace was the achievement of a long elusive dream, heightened during the dearth years spent in Greece. In her memoirs, she wrote: "Perhaps the only thing that I really want is a house of my own something that I can call mine. It has always been my greatest longing since the age of 17. My house to create, to improve, to make perfect and love, offering hospitality to and rejoicing with all those who would love it too. I think the possession of a house would really make me happy. I lived on that hope when I came back to Romania".

The Palace was the official residence of Princess Elisabeth until 1944, when King Michael I performed his coup and overthrew the Nazi-supporting government. After the coup, the Royal Palace of Bucharest was bombed by Germany, by that time being the official royal residence of the King of Romania, Michael moved into Elisabeta Palace with his mother to be directly in the centre of the capital; Princess Elisabeth had moved to Copăceni Castle.

On the evening of 30 December 1947, King Michael abdicated. Much later, he claimed that he was forced to do it at gunpoint, with the Palace surrounded by troops from the Tudor Vladimirescu Division, an army unit loyal to the Communists.

Following King Michael's abdication and throughout the period of the "Socialist Republic of Romania", the Palace fell into disuse until 2001, when the former Royal Family returned to Romania after nearly five decades of exile. At that time, they were given official use of the Palace by a bill signed by Traian Băsescu, 4th President of Romania, and approved by the Romanian Senate.

== Present ==
The palace currently serves as a working residence in Romania for Margareta, Custodian of the Crown, her husband Prince Radu, and two of her sisters, Princess Sofia and Princess Maria. It is also the headquarters of Her Majesty's Household Association (Romanian: Asociația Casa Majestății Sale), a non-governmental organization recognised by the government as an "organization of public utility" which supports the activities of the Royal Family.

Margareta and the royal family frequently receive cultural and political leaders at the Elisabeta Palace who have included Romanian presidents and prime ministers among many others. The royal family also receive foreign leaders at the Palace as well as hosting receptions, investitures and dinners. An annual Garden Party is given by Margareta in the grounds of the Palace on 10 May to celebrate Monarchy Day. In June 2021 the Royal Family held a Reception to mark 20 years since their return to the Elisabeta Palace.

From 2020 the Palace was opened to the public on Fridays, Saturdays and Sunday between July and September from 10 AM to 5 PM for guided tours of the public rooms and grounds.

== Image gallery ==
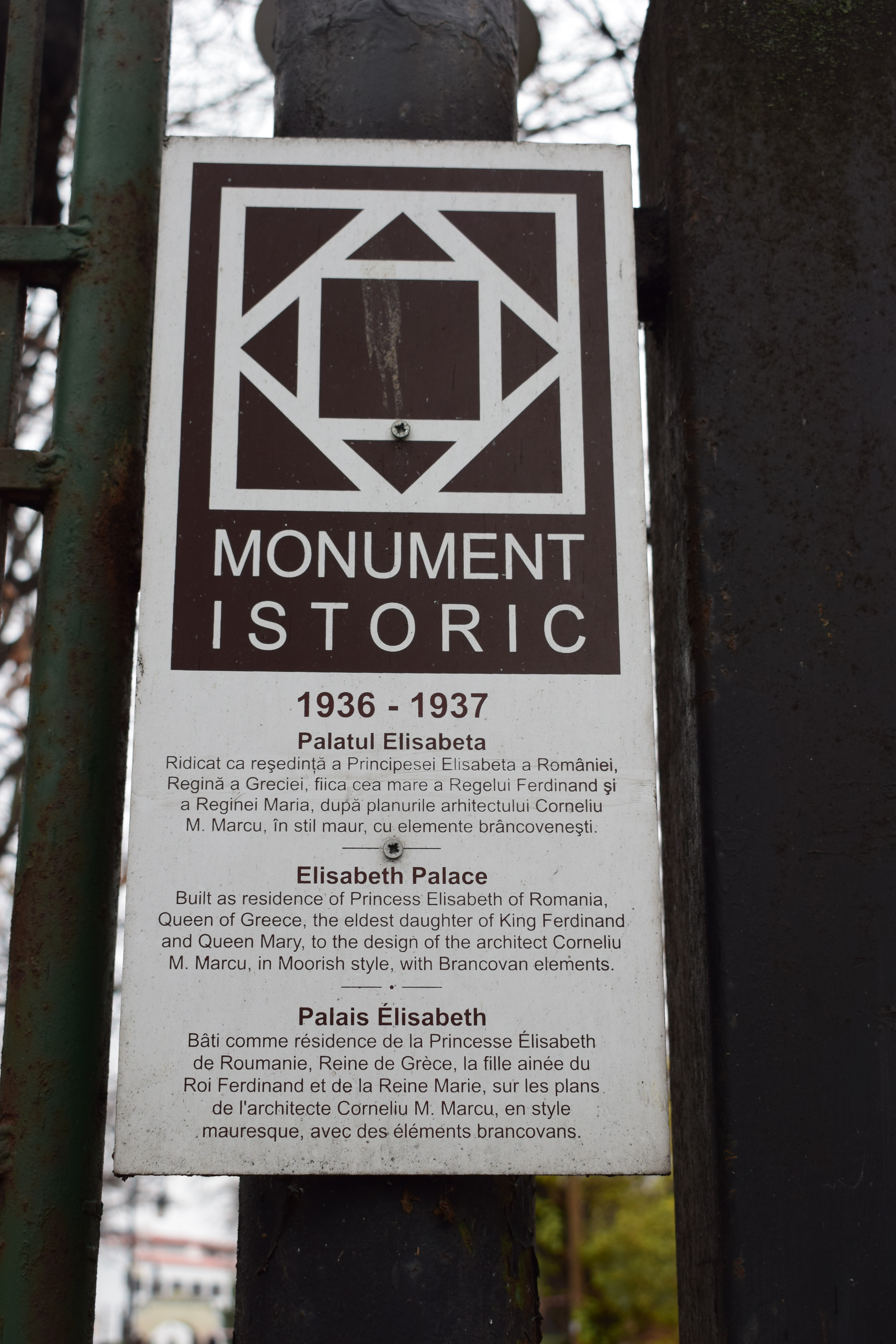
The trilingual plaque at the main gate, briefly tells the story of the building.

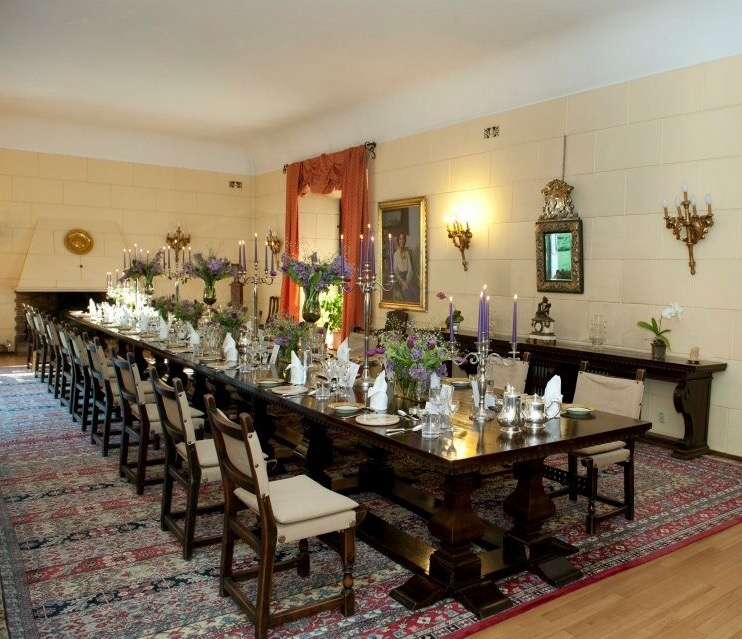
The dining room

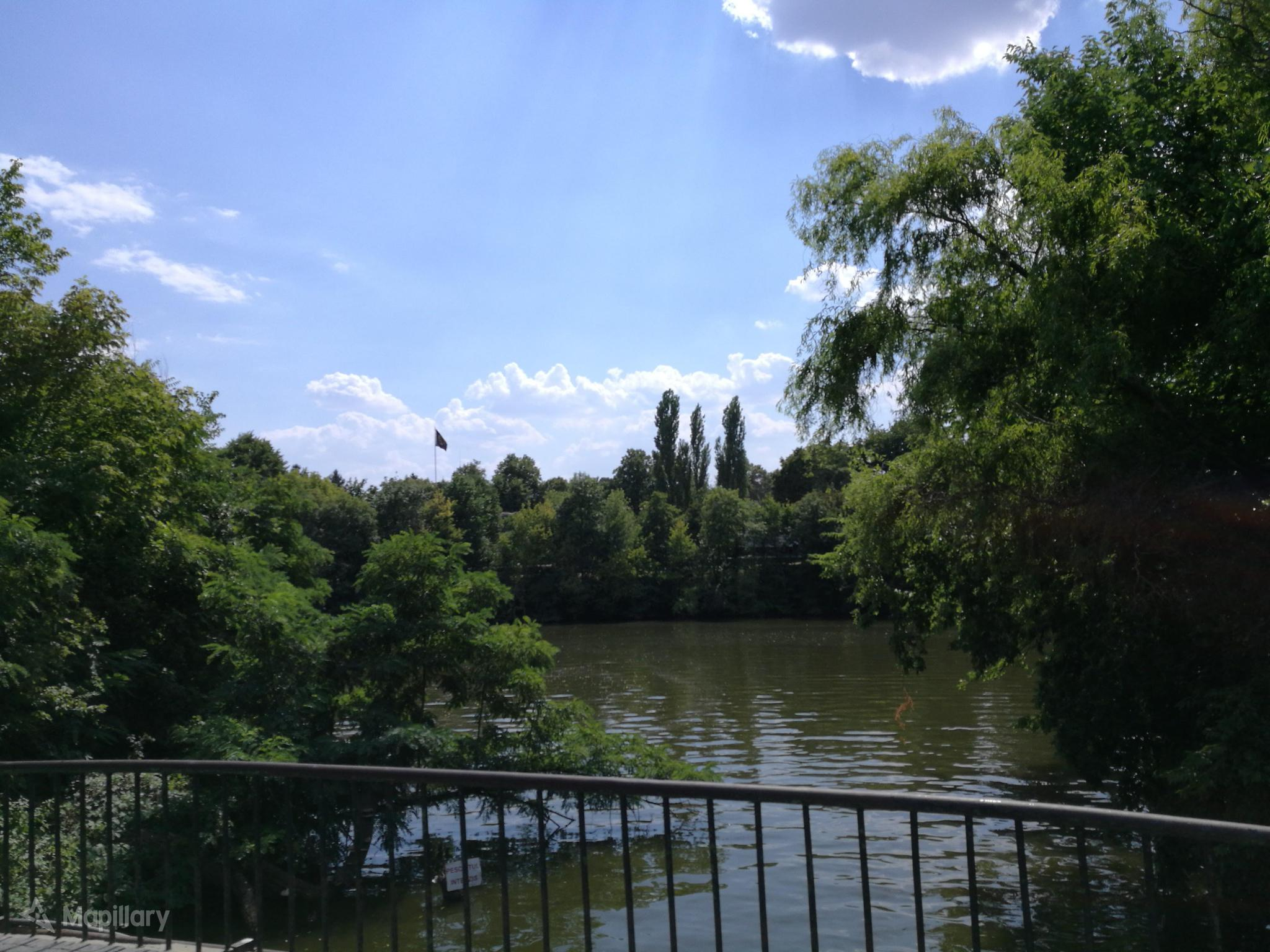
The personal flag of then Crown Princess Margareta of Romania flying over the palace

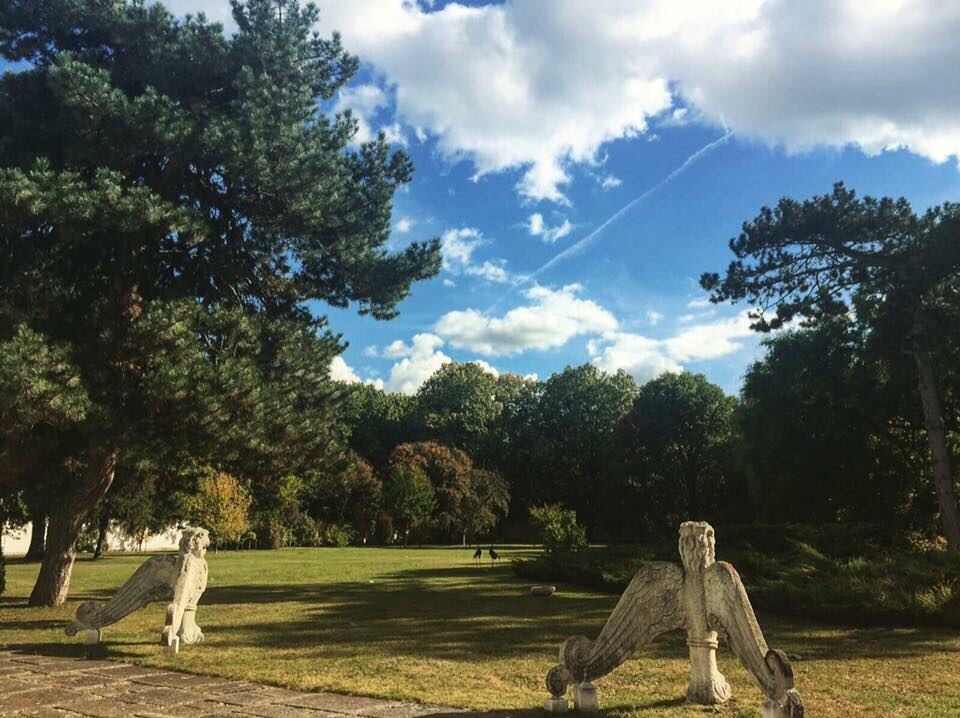
The garden

== See also ==
- Romanian Royal Family
- Săvârșin Castle
- Peleș Castle
- Pelișor Castle
