= Princess Maria of Romania (born 1964) =

Romanian royal

Princess Maria
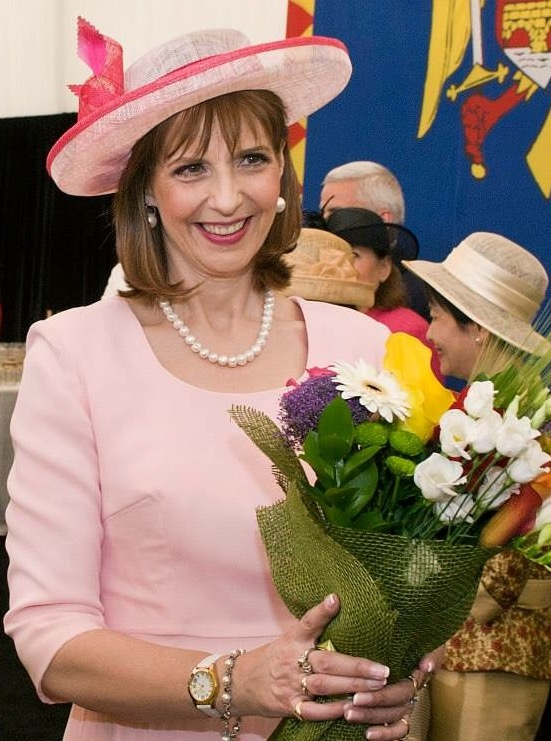
- Maria in 2015
- Born: 13 July 1964 (age 62); Gentofte Hospital, Copenhagen, Denmark
- Spouse: Kazimierz Wiesław Mystkowski (m. 1995; div. 2003)
- House: Romania (since 2011); Hohenzollern-Sigmaringen (until 2011)
- Father: Michael I of Romania
- Mother: Anne of Bourbon-Parma

Princess Maria of Romania (born 13 July 1964) is the fifth and youngest daughter of King Michael I and Queen Anne of Romania.

Since 2015 Maria has lived in Romania and carried out a public role on behalf of the Romanian royal family.

== Early life ==
Maria was born on 13 July 1964 at Copenhagen University Hospital Gentofte in Gentofte, Copenhagen, Denmark as the youngest of five daughters of King Michael I and Queen Anne. Maria was born while her father was in the United States on business for the New York Stock Exchange. Michael was informed by telephone that he'd become a father for the fifth time.

Maria was baptised by the Orthodox Church, with her eldest sister, Princess Margareta, as godmother. Queen Marie, her paternal great-grandmother, was her namesake.

As a young girl, Maria and her sisters were told "fascinating tales of a homeland they couldn't visit" by their father.

Maria was educated at public school Rydal Penrhos (then Penrhos College) and in Switzerland where the family lived during exile, and spent most her early adult life living and working in the United States, including New York and New Mexico.

== Careers ==
Maria's teenage years were spent in Switzerland with her family, where she received her primary and secondary education. She later moved to the United States to pursue her studies in childcare. After completing her studies, Maria worked briefly in the childcare field.

After Maria's brief career in childcare, she pursued a career in New York, doing public relations for private companies. During the Romanian Revolution of 1989, she, along with the rest of the royal family, worked to help the victims of those affected. In New York, she helped console the many U.S relatives of those killed in the uprising. When the situation in Romania eventually calmed down she left her public relations career and moved to New Mexico where she worked in private consulting until she moved to Romania in 2015.

== Activities in Romania ==
Maria visited Romania with her parents and other members of the family in 1997, and from this point onwards began visiting the country regularly for Christmas or family events such as her parents' 60th Wedding Anniversary and King Michael's 90th Birthday celebrations.

On 7 May 2014, Maria was invested with the Grand Cross of the Order of the Crown in a ceremony conducted by Crown Princess Margareta at the Elisabeta Palace to mark Maria's upcoming 50th birthday. This was followed by a dinner at the Palace attended by the Prime Minister of Romania (Victor Ponta) and other guests.

On 21 April 2015 it was announced by the Romanian cosmetic company Farmec that Maria is an official ambassador of the company, where she will participate in projects to promote products created in the research lab of the company, as well as social responsibility activities undertaken by Farmec.

In January 2015 it was announced that Maria would move to Romania permanently to take on activities in support of the royal family, and she was present in the public commemorations in Bucharest of 25 years since the royal family's return later the same month. Maria has represented the royal family at events across the country, acted in support of Margareta, Custodian of the Crown and taken on a number of patronages including Concordia Humanitarian Organisation.

During her father's illnesses, Maria and her elder sisters took turns to be with him at his home in Switzerland and it was during her stay that King Michael died.

== Marriage and divorce ==
On 16 September 1995, Maria married Kazimierz Wiesław Mystkowski (b. 13 September 1958 in Łaś-Toczyłowo), a Polish nobleman from the Mystkowski family and a computer engineer. Raised in a Catholic family, he is the son of Eugeniusz Mystkowski and his wife, Janina Wadelowska. The wedding celebration was held at the Greek Orthodox Holy Trinity Cathedral in New York, and was attended by the Romanian royal family, the parents of Kazimierz, the newly married Crown Prince and Crown Princess of Greece. King Michael I served as the couple's koumbaros (the best man who, during a Greek Orthodox wedding, exchanges the crowns over the couple’s heads). In December 2003, the couple subsequently divorced without producing any children.

== Legal issues ==
In July 2005, the princess was sued by her landlord, Donald Yates. During this court case, her name was given as "Mia Mystkowski." In October 2005, the court ruled in the landlord's favour, and ordered Marie to pay him $1,732.00. The case was administratively closed by the New Mexico judicial system in October 2019.

The next legal dispute in which the princess became entangled involved her HOA, the Sierra Madre Homeowners Association. On 5 December 2008, the homeowner's association filed a general civil complaint against "Marie de Roumanie"; this was followed the next day by a civil summons being issued to the princess. On 12 January 2009, Princess Maria of Romania was booked in Santa Fe County, New Mexico, on the charge of "failure to appear." Although divorced from her husband since 2003, she was booked under the name "Marie Mystkowski." The princess was released the same day on a $200.00 bond. The case was administratively closed in October 2015.

== Patronages ==
- Congress of the Romanian Society of Rhinology.
- Concordia Humanitarian Organization.
- National Recycling Patrol Program, developed by the Romanian Recycling Association RoRec.
- The International Chinological Exhibition in Alba Iulia.
- Annual Equestrian Event organized by the Equestria Club.
- The Caolin Contemporary International Ceramic Festival.
- The Badminton Romanian Federation.
- The 42nd Conventus Latin ENT.
- The National Agency for Equal Opportunities for Women and Men.
- The Children in Distress Foundation.

== National honours ==
=== Dynastic ===
- House of Romania:
  - Knight Grand Cross of the Royal Order of the Crown
  - Knight of the Royal Decoration of the Custodian of the Romanian Crown, 1st Class

=== Ecclesiastical ===
- Order of Our Lady of Prayer (Romanian Orthodox Church)
