= Patriarch Miron of Romania =

Romanian Orthodox patriarch and prime minister (1868–1939)

His Beatitude Patriarch Miron of Romania
- By God's mercy, Archbishop of Bucharest, Metropolitan of Ungro-Vlachia, Locum tenens of the throne of Caesarea Cappadociae; Patriarch of All Romania; Prime Minister of Romania
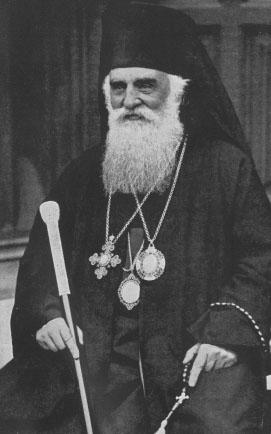
- Miron in 1936
- Church: Romanian Orthodox
- Archdiocese: Bucharest
- Elected: 1919
- Term ended: 1939
- Predecessor: Conon Arămescu-Donici
- Successor: Patriarch Nicodim of Romania

Personal details
- Born: Elie Cristea; 20 July 1868 Toplița, Austria-Hungary
- Died: 6 March 1939 (aged 70) Cannes, France
- Buried: Romanian Patriarchal Cathedral

Prime Minister of Romania
- In office 11 February 1938 – 6 March 1939
- Monarch: Carol II
- Deputy: Armand Călinescu
- Preceded by: Octavian Goga
- Succeeded by: Armand Călinescu

Personal details
- Party: National Renaissance Front
- Profession: priest

Miron Cristea (Romanian pronunciation: [miˈron ˈkriste̯a]; monastic name of Elie Cristea [eˈli.e]; 20 July 1868 – 6 March 1939) was a Romanian cleric and politician.

A bishop in Hungarian-ruled Transylvania, Cristea was elected Metropolitan-Primate of the Orthodox Church of the newly unified Greater Romania in 1919. As the Church was raised to a rank of Patriarchate, Miron Cristea was enthroned as the first Patriarch of the Romanian Orthodox Church in 1925.

In 1938, after Carol II banned political parties and established a royal dictatorship, he chose Cristea to be Prime Minister of Romania, a position in which he served for about a year (between 11 February 1938 and his death on 6 March 1939).

== Biography ==
=== Early life ===
Born in Toplița to Gheorghe and Domnița Cristea, a peasant family, he studied at the Saxon Evangelical Gymnasium of Bistrița (1879–1883), at the Greek-Catholic Lyceum of Năsăud (1883–1887), at the Orthodox Seminary of Sibiu (1887–1890), after which he became a teacher and principal at the Romanian Orthodox school of Orăștie (1890–1891).

Cristea then studied philosophy and modern philology at the University of Budapest (1891–1895), where he was awarded a doctorate in 1895 – with a dissertation about the life and works of Mihai Eminescu (given in Hungarian).

Returning to Transylvania, he was a secretary (between 1895 and 1902), then a counselor (1902–1909) at the Archbishopric of Sibiu. It was then that he was ordained deacon in 1900 and archdeacon in 1901. Cristea became a monk at the Hodoș Bodrog Monastery, Arad County in 1902, taking the monastic name of Miron. He climbed the monastery hierarchy, becoming an archmonk in 1903 and a protosingel in 1908.

In 1908, following the death of bishop Nicolae Popea, the election of the bishop of Caransebeș led to a dispute between the Romanian Orthodox Church and the Imperial authorities, when, twice in a row, the elected bishops were not recognized by emperor Franz Joseph I of Austria, at the recommendation of the Hungarian government. Cristea was the third choice, being chosen on 21 November 1910, and, thanks to the support of Baron Géza Duka de Kádár, obtaining the recognition from the authorities and membership in the House of Magnates; he became an archbishop in 1919.

During World War I, as Romania joined the war on the Allies' side, Cristea signed on 1 September 1916, a public letter to the parishioners printed at Oradea by the Orthodox Bishopric of Transylvania. The letter called to arms all believers against "Romania the new enemy which sinfully covets to ruin the borders, coming to conquer Transylvania". According to some historians, during the Serbian occupation of the Lugoj-Caransebeș Banat in 1918, Bishop Cristea mentioned King Peter I of Serbia in church services instead of King Ferdinand I of Romania.

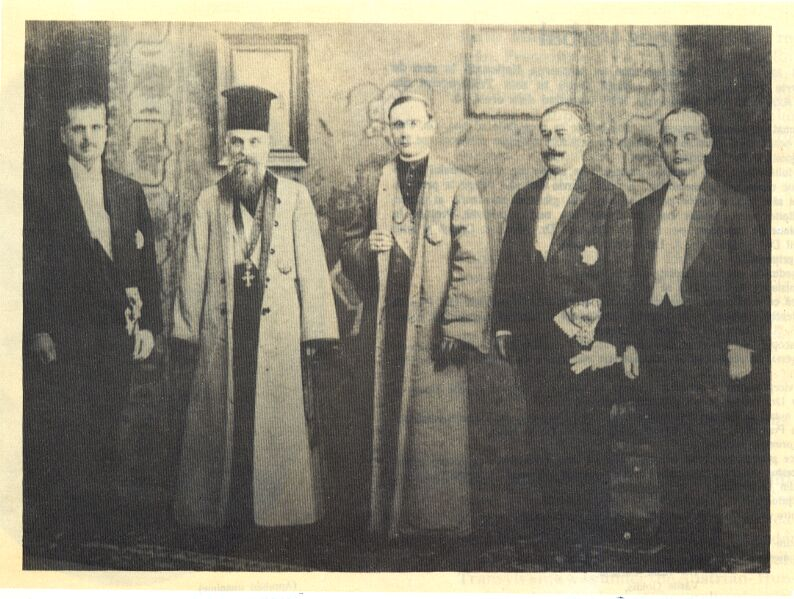
The Transylvanian delegation (Vasile Goldiș, Cristea, Iuliu Hossu, Alexandru Vaida-Voevod, Caius Brediceanu) that brought to Bucharest the Unification Act of Transylvania with Romania

Towards the end of World War I, on 18 October 1918, the Central National Romanian Central Council was formed, an organization which fought for the union of Transylvania and Romania. On 21 November, Cristea, as archbishop of Caransebeș joined the organization and recognized it as the only ruling body of the Romanian nation in Transylvania. On 1 December, he was (with Vasile Goldiș, Iuliu Hossu, and Alexandru Vaida-Voevod) a member of Austro-Hungarian Romanian delegation that called for the unification of Romania and Transylvania.

On 28 May 1919, the King and government of Romania went to the grave of Michael the Brave in Câmpia Turzii and Bishop Cristea lead the religious service of commemoration and held a nationalist speech in which he drew a parallel between King Ferdinand I and Michael the Brave and recommended the King to not stop at Turda, but continuing all the way to the Tisa River.

=== Metropolitan-Primate and Patriarch ===
Because of his collaboration with the German occupation troops, the Metropolitan-Primate Conon Arămescu-Donici was forced to resign on 1 December 1919 and on 31 December 1919, Cristea was chosen by the Great Electoral College as the first Metropolitan-Primate of Greater Romania with 435 votes out of 447. The Romanian Orthodox Church was elevated to a patriarchate in 1925. On 1 November 1925, after a Synod was held, Cristea was named Patriarch of the Romanian Orthodox Church.

As Metropolitan-Primate and later Patriarch, Cristea continued the tradition of his predecessors to support whatever government was in power. The church acted as an agency of the state, for instance, in 1920, Cristea asked the clergymen to aid the state financially by encouraging the faithful to buy government bonds. Cristea's discourse incorporated nationalist and statist elements, arguing that Orthodox religion was integral to the Romanian soul, and he argued that the church's values include "patriotism" and "obedience to [civil] authorities" alongside "faith and morality".

Cristea introduced reforms such as the Gregorian calendar to the church, including, briefly, the celebration of Pascha (Easter) on the same date as the Roman Catholic Church. This was opposed by various groups of traditionalists and Old Calendarists, especially in Moldavia, where Metropolitan Gurie Grosu of Bessarabia refused to accept the orders given by the Patriarchate.

Standard of the Regent of Romania (1927–1930)

In 1927, he was chosen by Ionel Brătianu to be one of the three regents of King Michael I of Romania, alongside Prince Nicholas of Romania and Gheorghe Buzdugan.

Cristea's involvement in politics was, however, controversial, being criticised by journalists at Epoca newspaper, who accused him of trying to play the role of Rasputin and being a member of the palace camarilla. This resulted in the issue being confiscated by the police, and Epoca offices being vandalized by hooligans, allegedly incited by the government.

A dispute arose with philosopher Nae Ionescu after Ionescu attacked Cristea for hypocrisy in newspaper articles following a lavish dinner with Cristea during the Nativity Fast at which they were served, amongst other things, turkey. In retaliation, Cristea requested that the iconographer Belizarie paint Ionescu's face on a figure of the devil in the Patriarchal Cathedral in Bucharest's Apocalypse-themed mural.

In 1929, because of a serious illness (identified as leucocythemia by his medics), Cristea retired for several months to a country house in Dragoslavele, Muscel County, but despite the bleak predictions about his health state, he was soon able to return to Bucharest.

On 6 July 1930, Carol II returned to Romania to assume power. On 7 July, Miron Cristea and Constantin Sărățeanu resigned from the regency and the following day, the Parliament revoked the 1926 law which gave the throne to Mihai, Carol becoming King again.

Cristea kept his loyalty to King Carol II throughout his rule. In March 1937, as the King attempted to suppress the influence of the fascist movement known as the Iron Guard, Cristea responded to the request sent by the Tătărescu government on limiting the relationship between the clergy and the Iron Guard. Cristea invoked a Holy Synod which banned clergy from joining the Legion and disallowed political demonstrations and symbols in the churches.

=== Prime Minister of Romania ===
In a bid for political unity against the Iron Guard, which was gaining popularity, on 10 February 1938, Carol dismissed the government of Prime Minister Octavian Goga and seized emergency powers. He suspended the constitution, suspended all political activity, and ruled by decree. Cristea was named Prime Minister on 11 February 1938. He headed a government that included seven former prime ministers and members of all major parties except for Codreanu's Iron Guard and Goga's Lăncieri, which had violently clashed. Time magazine described him as a "puppet Premier" of Carol II, whereas historian Joseph Rothschild considered that it was Cristea's vice-prime-minister, Armand Călinescu, who held the power in the Cristea government.

In his inaugural speech, Cristea denounced liberal pluralism, arguing that "the monster with 29 electoral heads was destroyed" (referring to the 29 political parties which were to be banned) and claiming that the king shall bring salvation.

The new government stopped the antisemitic violence that was unleashed under Goga's rule, but the antisemitic legislation in place was not altered, as Nichifor Crainic's racist, fascist ideology fit comfortably with the social views and political theology of the Romanian Orthodox Church.

At Carol's direction, Cristea's government declared state of siege, which allowed among other things, searches without warrant and the military appropriation of privately held guns. He also imposed harsh press censorship and restored the death penalty. However, Cristea promised prosperity through some constitutional and social reforms, which were to include the "organized emigration of Jewish surplus population", that is, expulsion of all Jews who came to Romania during or after World War I. However, it eased the antisemitic restrictions imposed by the Goga government.

The external politics of the Cristea government were based on seeking an alliance with the United Kingdom and France, away from the friendship with the Berlin-Rome Axis supported by the Goga government. Cristea also visited Poland, with which Romania had an alliance and with which it tried to create a neutral block between Nazi Germany and the USSR.

Among the policies Cristea introduced during his rule as Prime Minister was a crackdown on the Protestant minority, by disallowing religious service to small congregations with less than 100 heads of families, basically banning the services in around 1500 small chapels belonging to various non-Orthodox Christian denominations. Despite worldwide protests from the Baptists, the ban was only lifted after Cristea's death by his successor, the National Renaissance Front's Armand Călinescu.

On 20 February, a new constitution was announced, which organized Romania as a "corporatist state" similar to the one of Fascist Italy, with a parliament made up of representatives of the guilds of farmers, workers and intellectuals. Four days later, on 24 February, the constitution was approved, with 99.87% of votes for, through a plebiscite, described by a contemporary article in The Manchester Guardian as a "farse" for its lack of vote secrecy and the lack of information given to rural voters .

Upon the approval of the new constitution, Cristea's government resigned on 30 March. He formed a new government later that day. The new government banned all political parties, their activity being only suspended before that.

In March 1938, Corneliu Zelea Codreanu, the leader of the Iron Guard, attacked in a letter the politicians who supported Carol II, including Prime Minister Cristea and members of his government. Codreanu was arrested for slander against Nicolae Iorga and killed "while attempting to escape".

By the end of 1938, Carol II introduced even more Fascist-inspired elements. In December 1938, the National Renaissance Front was formed as the only legally permitted party. On 1 January 1939; Cristea's government visited the Royal Palace wearing uniforms. When they met Carol, Cristea and the ministers greeted him with the Fascist salute.

=== Deteriorating health and death ===
His health deteriorated in January 1939, suffering from two heart attacks, which prompted his doctors to recommend him to stay in a warmer place for a few months, in order to avoid the harsher Romanian winter. In response, on 1 February 1939, Călinescu took over most of Cristea's powers, while Cristea remained nominally the Prime Minister at the King's insistence.

On 24 February 1939, Cristea arrived in Cannes, France, but contracted pneumonia while waiting for his niece in the Nice railway station. He stayed in Cannes for treatment, but died two weeks later, on 6 March, of bronchopneumonia complicated by heart disease.

His body was sent by train to Bucharest, the funeral train stopping in all stations in Romania to permit believers to pay their last respects and say prayers before the body. On 7 March, a state of national mourning was ordered and all festivities were canceled. A week later, on 14 March, funeral services were held in Bucharest, Cristea being buried in the Patriarchal Cathedral.

== Political positions and policies ==
Cristea's political positions were nationalistic, seeing for Romania external threats from both the east, in the form of communism and the Soviet Union and from the capitalist and modernist west.

=== Toward other Christian denominations ===
As he became the head of the Orthodox Church in Greater Romania, a multiethnic and multireligious state, Cristea feared that the ethnic minorities, as well as Romanians belonging to non-Orthodox creeds such as the Greek-Catholicism and the Jews would challenge the privileged status which the Orthodox Church had in pre-World War I Romania.

Nevertheless, Cristea attempted an ecumenical close-up with the Anglican Church, by visiting Cosmo Gordon Lang, the Archbishop of Canterbury, in 1936.

Cristea strongly opposed the idea of a Concordat with the Vatican and the Romanian Orthodox Church issued a statement against it saying that "the treaty subordinates the interests of the country and the sovereignty of the state to a foreign power". The Romanian Senate ratified it anyway on 26 May 1929, and Cristea, as a member of the regency, was forced to sign it. This has led again to discussions about the incompatibility between his two posts and there were discussions on whether Cristea would have resigned rather than sign the Concordat.

After Cristea introduced reforms such as switching to the Gregorian calendar, the Old Calendar Romanian Orthodox Church, led by Glicherie Tănase seceded many parishes from the Orthodox Church and by 1936 they had built more than 40 churches. However, after 1935, the Romanian government began to suppress any opposition to the Orthodox Church and the churches were razed and some of the activists imprisoned, while a number of clerics, including hieromonk Pambo and five monks from the Old Calendarist Cucova Monastery, were beaten to death. Protests against the authorities' actions were met with repression by police and the leader of Old Calendarists, Tănase, was accused of being an instigator and sentenced to death.

In 1937, William Temple, the Archbishop of York, sent a letter to Cristea in which he questioned religious freedom in Romania, referring especially to the treatment of the Baptists. Cristea denied such claims and responded in a long document in which he said Temple was misled by the "perverse propaganda" and the "false mystification" of the Magyars, as well as the "ferocious and barbaric proselytism of the Pope". He further added, referring to neo-Protestants, that Romania should not allow to be "undermined by foreigners dressed in innocent pseudo-religious garb".

=== Toward the Jews ===
Early during his tenure as Patriarch, Cristea supported tolerance towards the Jewish people. For instance, in 1928, he made an appeal towards the Romanian students to observe the Golden Rule and he expressed regrets for attacks and profanations of synagogues.

In the 1930s, as the Fascist Iron Guard rose in popularity, initially, Cristea's position towards them was of acceptance, especially since their program included loyalty to Orthodoxism. Many Orthodox priests were attracted by the movement and it was common that their banners were blessed in churches.

In 1937, Cristea realized that the Iron Guard was decreasing the loyalty of both the Orthodox Christians and the lower-ranked clergy to the church hierarchy and began to oppose the Guard, while adopting their antisemitic and xenophobic rhetoric: he supported the revocation of the Romanian citizenship for Jewish people and their deportation, the Jews being in his opinion the major obstacle in "assuring preponderant rights to ethnic Romanians".

On 18 August 1937, he issued a statement which called the Romanian nation "to fight the Jewish parasites" who spread "epidemics of corruption" throughout Romania and that the Romanians have "a national and patriotic duty" to protect themselves against the Jews:

"The duty of a Christian is to love himself first and to see that his needs are satisfied. Only then can he help his neighbor. . . . Why should we not get rid of these parasites [Jews] who suck Romanian Christian blood? It is logical and holy to react against them."

In 1938, during a meeting with Wilhelm Fabricius, the German ambassador, Cristea praised the antisemitic policy conducted by Nazi Germany and supporting such a policy in Romania, and the British Ambassador wrote in his report to London that "Nothing would induce him [i.e., Cristea] to talk about anything but the Jewish problem."

== Legacy ==
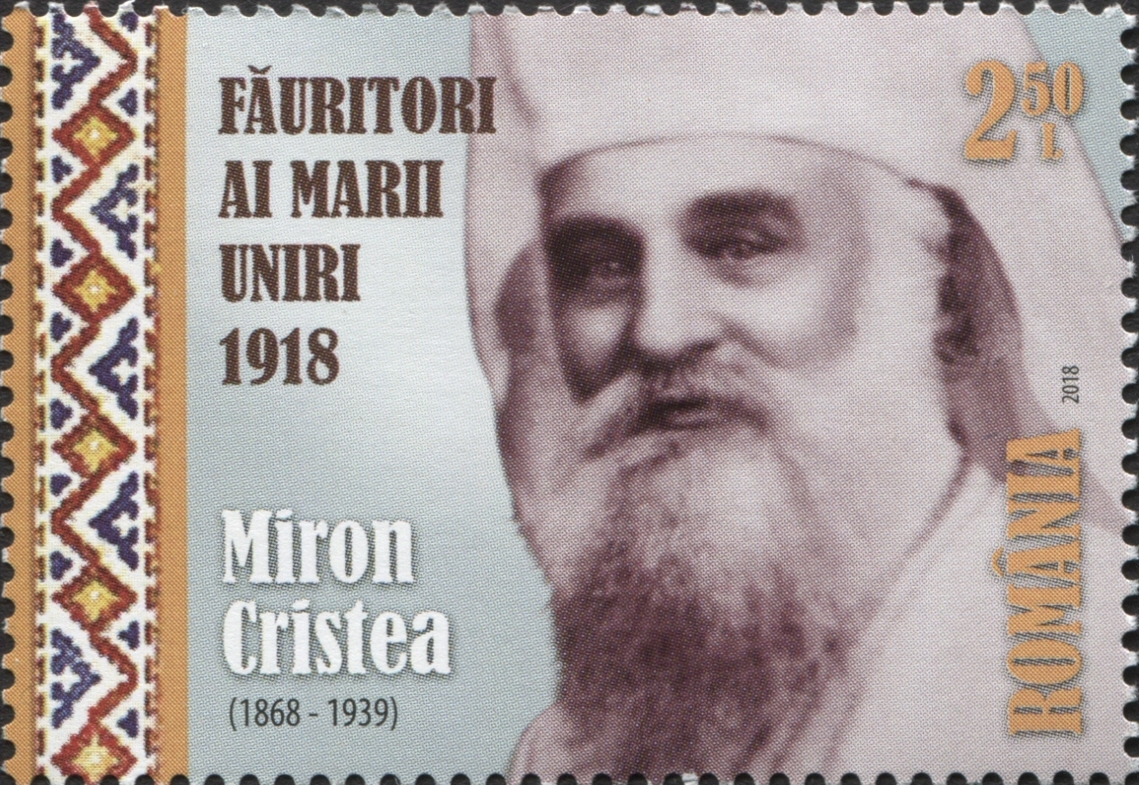
Miron on a 2018 stamp of Romania

His birthplace home in Toplița is currently a museum dedicated to his life. Each year, on Cristea's birthday, the Romanian Orthodox Patriarchate organizes the "Miron Cristea Days", dedicated to the first patriarch of the Church and which feature various cultural activities.

In July 2010, the National Bank of Romania minted a commemorative coin bearing Cristea's image as a part of a collectors' series of five coins showing the Patriarchs of All Romania. In response, Radu Ioanid, international archives director at the United States Holocaust Memorial Museum, called for the coin be withdrawn. On 20 August, the National Bank of Romania announced that it would not withdraw the Cristea coin.

Patriarch Miron was awarded Order of Karađorđe's Star by Serbia.

Eastern Orthodox Church titles
Preceded by Conon Arămescu-Donici	Metropolitan of All Romania; 1919–1925	Title Renamed
New title	Patriarch of All Romania; 1925–1939	Succeeded by Nicodim Munteanu
Political offices
Preceded by Octavian Goga	Prime Minister of Romania; 1938–1939	Succeeded by Armand Călinescu
