= Prince Nicholas of Romania =

Prince Regent of Romania from 1927–1930

Prince Nicholas
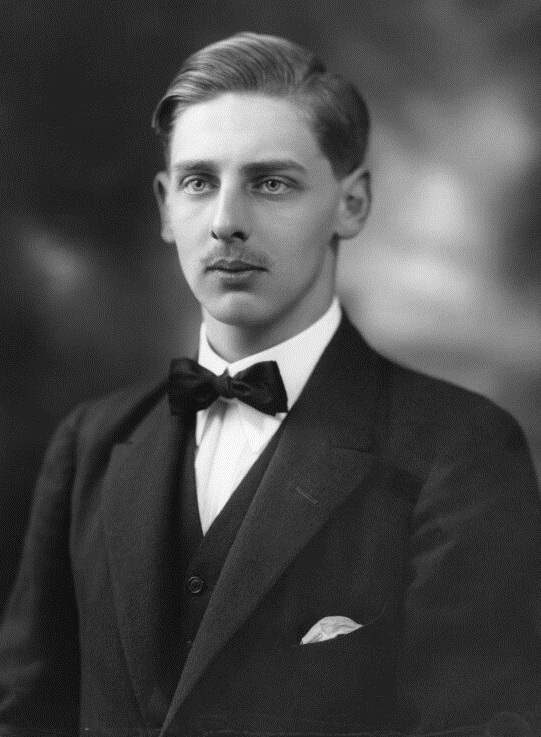
- Nicholas in 1922

Prince Regent of Romania
- Tenure: 20 July 1927 – 8 June 1930
- Monarch: Michael I
- Born: 5 August 1903; Peleş Castle, Sinaia, Kingdom of Romania
- Died: 9 July 1978 (aged 74); Madrid, Spain
- Burial: The New Archbishopric and Royal Cathedral in Curtea de Argeș
- Spouses: Ioana Dumitrescu-Doletti (m. 1931; died 1963) Thereza Lisboa Figueira de Mello (m. 1967)
- House: Hohenzollern-Sigmaringen
- Father: Ferdinand I of Romania
- Mother: Marie of Edinburgh

Prince Nicholas of Romania (Romanian: Principele Nicolae al României; 5 August 1903 – 9 July 1978), later known as Prince Nicholas of Hohenzollern-Sigmaringen, was the fourth child and second son of King Ferdinand I of Romania and his wife Queen Marie.

In 1927 after the death of his father, Nicholas was appointed as one of the three regents for his minor nephew King Michael I. His position as regent ended in 1930 with the return of his older brother Prince Carol to Romania to take over as King of Romania.

In later 1930, he was stripped of his titles and privileges and exiled from the Royal Court, due to King Carol II's disapproval of his marriage. On 10 July 1942, after the removal of King Carol II from the throne, during King Michael's second reign, Nicholas was given by the king the title of Nicholas of Hohenzollern — of the house to which he belonged.

He died in exile on 9 July 1978 in Madrid, Spain.

== Early life ==
Nicholas was born on 5 August 1903 in Peleș Castle, Sinaia as the second son of Crown Prince Ferdinand of Romania and his wife Princess Marie of Saxe-Coburg and Gotha and Edinburgh. His siblings were Carol II of Romania, Elisabeth of Romania, Queen Maria of Yugoslavia, Princess Ileana of Romania and Prince Mircea of Romania. Nicholas was named after his mother’s first cousin, Nicholas II, the last Emperor of Russia.

In her memoirs, his mother wrote: "He was exceedingly independent, and always funny. He never could be still for a second; he was for ever “up and doing.” Although far from good or obedient, he had a way of getting people to do what he wanted. Wherever Nicky went, he went to rule and order about, not because he was imperious and aggressive, but because he was funny. His funniness was of the good-humoured, irresistible kind which amuses even the dullest. Even as a tiny tot, his repartees were so comic that, instead of receiving the scolding he deserved he roused instead fun and laughter. Comically sly, he always had his own way, breaking down every defence or restriction." He had a long nose, piercing blue eyes and silvery hair. His mother recalled him often tugging his sister Mignon's hair.

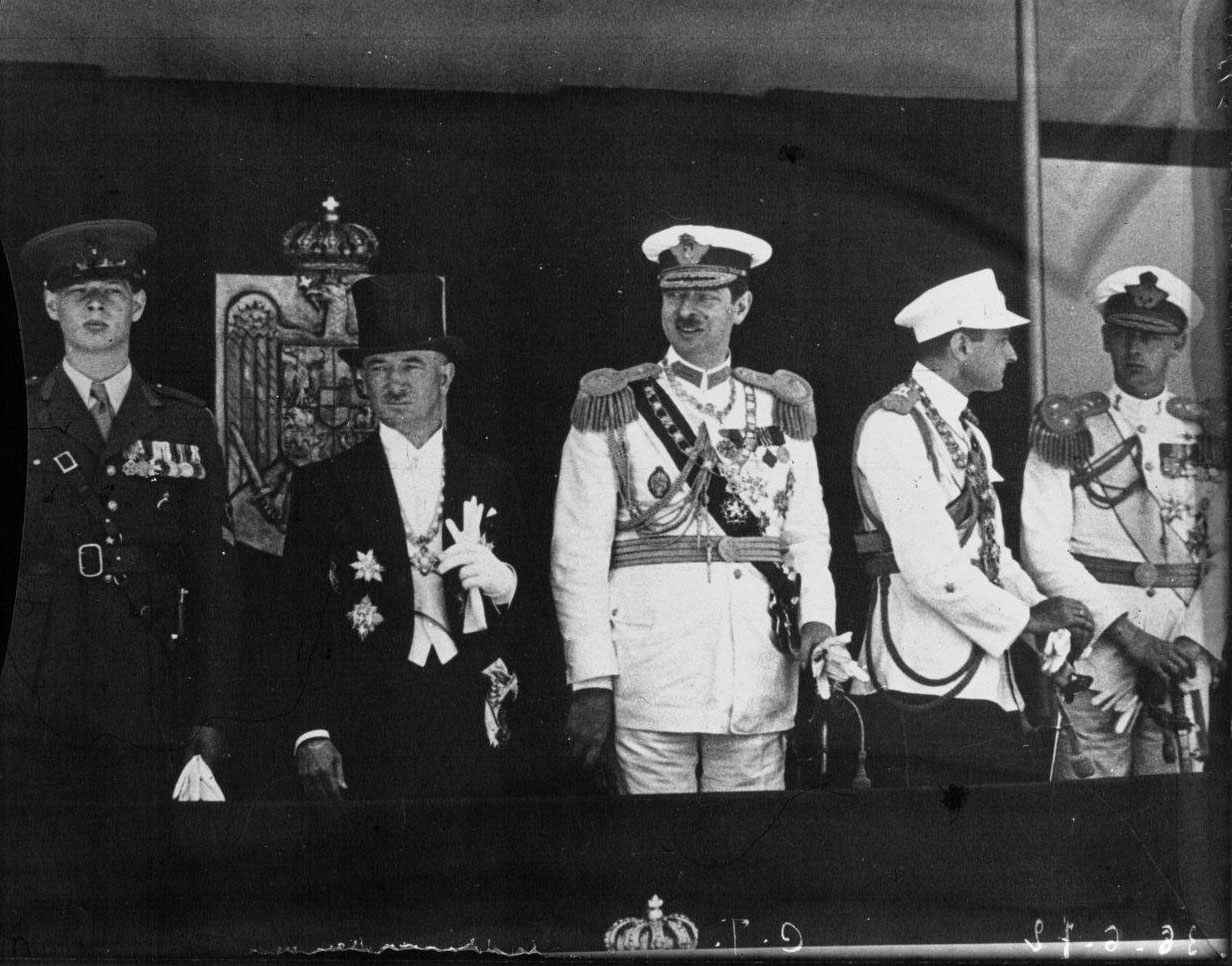
Prince Nicholas of Romania (first from right) with his brother, King Carol II (centre), together with Yugoslav Prince Regent Paul (second from right), Prince Michael of Romania (first from left) and the Czechoslovak President Edvard Beneš (second from left), in Bucharest in 1936.

== Biography ==
Nicholas was the younger brother of Carol, heir apparent, who renounced his rights of succession on 12 December 1925. When Ferdinand died in 1927, he was succeeded as King by Carol's five-year-old son, Michael; Nicholas himself had been proposed as heir-apparent when Carol married the commoner Zizi Lambrino in 1918 (a marriage later annulled). Given Michael's youth, a regency council had to be formed (20 July), and Prince Nicholas was forced to abandon his career in the British Royal Navy—in which he held the honorary rank of sub-lieutenant—in order to return home to serve on the council, alongside Gheorghe Buzdugan and Patriarch Miron Cristea.

Standard of the Regent of Romania (1927-1930)

Although unofficially referred to as "the first-ranking regent", Nicholas resented having to abandon his naval career and had no interest in politics. He tried to continue his father's cooperation with the National Liberals (PNL), and to contain the opposition of the National Peasants' Party (PNŢ) to the regency by appointing a national government under Ion I. C. Brătianu. Refused by Brătianu, he witnessed a change in Carol's stance in mid-1927, when the latter argued that he had been forced to give up his throne. The cooperation between Carol and the PNŢ was successfully neutralized by the PNL, but Brătianu's death in 1927 restored contacts and increased the appeal of the PNŢ. By then, the regency was widely perceived as consisting of figureheads, and, after Constantin Sărăţeanu (an appointee of PNŢ leader Iuliu Maniu) succeeded the deceased Buzdugan in 1929, it was believed to be torn apart by contrasting political ambitions. According to Nicolae Iorga, Miron Cristea himself had said:

"The Regency does not work because it has no head. The Prince smokes his cigarettes, Sărăţeanu looks through his books, and I, as a priest, can only try to reconcile."

Nicholas was at first delighted when Carol returned home to Romania on 8 June 1930 (becoming King Carol II and thus putting an end to the regency arrangement). He welcomed the Parliament session that voted to repeal the 1926 legislation, and accompanied his newly arrived brother from Băneasa Airfield to Cotroceni Palace.

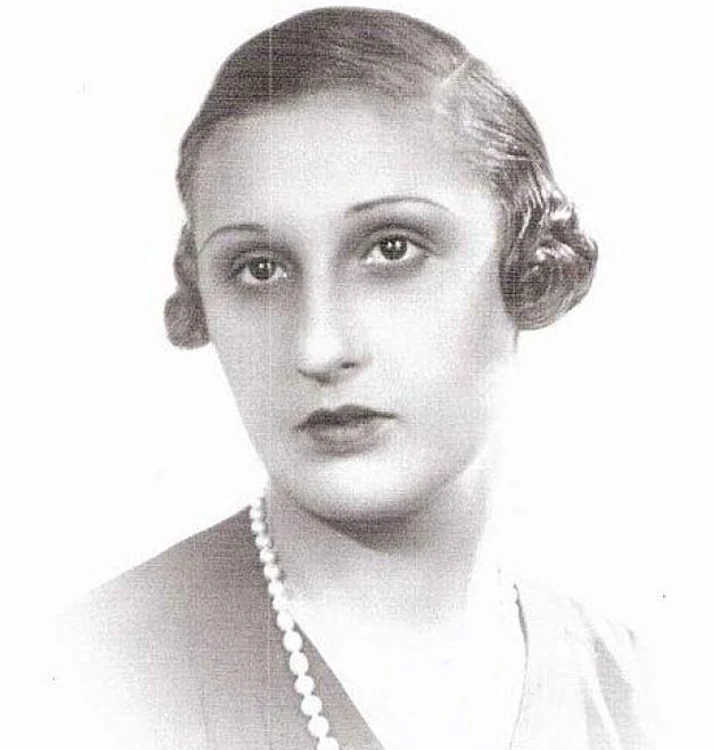
The first wife of Prince Nicholas of Romania, Ioana Dumitrescu-Doletti.

However, the cordial relations between Nicholas and Carol were short-lived. Nicholas wanted to marry Ioana Dumitrescu-Doletti, a divorced woman belonging to a Tohani landowning family, but was aware it might prove embarrassing for the king to authorize such a marriage. Carol himself suggested that the couple should marry without first seeking his consent (even though members of the royal family were required to obtain the king's consent before marrying). Carol had intimated that under these circumstances he would accept the marriage as a fait accompli, but after the wedding Carol promptly used it as an excuse to deprive Nicholas of his royal privileges and titles and to exile him from Romania. He left for Spain, and ultimately settled in Switzerland.

Nicholas was married twice. His first marriage took place in Tohani, Romania, on 7 November 1931, the bride being Ioana Dumitrescu-Doletti (24 September 1910 in Bucharest – 19 February 1963 in Lausanne). Dumitrescu-Doletti's first husband had been Romanian politician Radu Săveanu (son of Nicolae Săveanu), whom she married on 11 December 1924. Nicholas' second marriage took place on 13 July 1967 in Lausanne to Brazilian Maria Thereza Lisboa Figueira de Mello (10 June 1913 in Rome – 30 March 1997 in Madrid), daughter of Col. Jerónimo de Ávila Figueira de Melo and his wife, Cândida Ribeiro Lisboa, and the sister of Francisco Lisboa Figueira de Melo, former ambassador of Portugal to Germany (born 12 March 1912 in Vienna). Figueira de Mello's first husband was Venezuelian heir Andrés Boulton Pietri (1910 in Caracas – 1998), whom she married in Caracas on 2 July 1936, a union that produced four children: Roger (born 1937), Maria Thereza (born 1939), Andres (born 1943) and William (born 1945).

The Prince also took an interest in motor racing, competing in the 1933 24 Hours of Le Mans and the 1935 24 Hours of Le Mans driving his own Duesenberg Model SJ.

== Archives ==
Prince Nicholas's personal papers (including family correspondence and photographs) are preserved in the "Nicolas, Prince of Romania Papers" collection in the Hoover Institution Archives (Stanford, California, USA). There is also correspondence of Prince Nicholas preserved in the "Mother Alexandra Papers" collection, also in the Hoover Institution Archives (Stanford, California, USA).

== Honours ==
=== National ===
- Kingdom of Romania: Knight Grand Cross with Collar of the Order of Carol I - Revoked
- Kingdom of Romania: Knight of the Order of Michael the Brave, 3rd Class
- Kingdom of Romania: Knight Grand Cross of the Order of the Star of Romania - Revoked
- Kingdom of Romania: Knight Officer of the Order of the Crown - Revoked
- Kingdom of Romania: Knight Officer of the Order of Faithful Service - Revoked
- House of Hohenzollern-Sigmaringen: Knight Grand Cross of the House Order of Hohenzollern
- Romania: Air marshal Badge of the Romanian Air Force - Post Revoked

=== Foreign ===
- Czechoslovakia: Knight Grand Cross of the Order of the White Lion
- France: Knight Grand Cross of the Legion of Honour
- Sovereign Military Order of Malta: Knight Grand Cross in Obedience of the Sovereign Military Order of Malta
- Poland: Knight Grand Cross of the Order of the White Eagle
- (Kingdom of Yugoslavia) Yugoslavian Royal Family: Knight Grand Cross of the Order of the White Eagle
- Kingdom of Bulgaria: Great Cross of the Order of St Alexander (Grand Necklace) (1934)

Honorary Military Rank and other awards

- United Kingdom: Honorary Lieutenant Badge of British Royal Navy
- Romania: 1'st President of the Romanian kennel club

== Ancestry ==
Ancestors of Prince Nicholas of Romania

8. Karl Anton, Prince of Hohenzollern
4. Leopold, Prince of Hohenzollern
9. Princess Josephine of Baden
2. Ferdinand I of Romania
10. Ferdinand II of Portugal
5. Infanta Antónia of Portugal
11. Maria II of Portugal
1. Prince Nicholas of Romania
12. Prince Albert of Saxe-Coburg and Gotha
6. Alfred, Duke of Saxe-Coburg and Gotha
13. Victoria of the United Kingdom
3. Princess Marie of Edinburgh
14. Alexander II of Russia
7. Grand Duchess Maria Alexandrovna of Russia
15. Princess Marie of Hesse and by Rhine
