= Gheorghe Buzdugan =

Romanian judge (1867-1929)

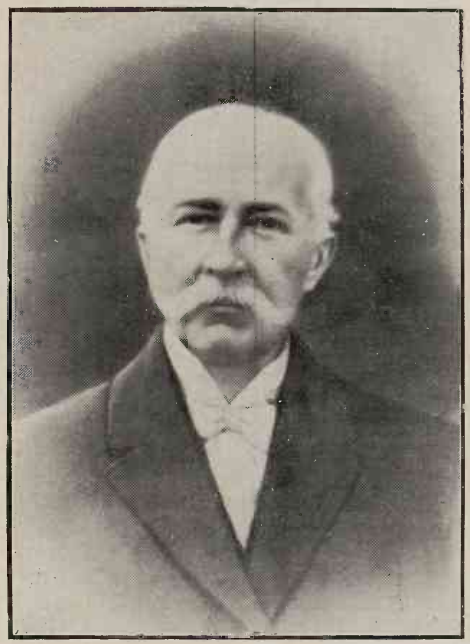

10th President of the High Court of Cassation and Justice
- In office August 5, 1924 – July 27, 1927
- Appointed by: King Ferdinand I
- Preceded by: Victor Râmniceanu
- Succeeded by: Oscar Niculescu

Regent of Romania
- In office July 27, 1927 – October 7, 1929
- Monarch: Michael I

Personal details
- Born: 10 February 1867 Focșani, Romania
- Died: October 7, 1929 (aged 62) Bucharest, Kingdom of Romania
- Resting place: Faraoani, Bacău County
- Education: University of Bucharest
- Profession: Lawyer
- Awards: Honorary member of the Romanian Academy

Gheorghe V. Buzdugan (February 10, 1867 – October 7, 1929) was a Romanian jurist and politician.

Born in Focșani, Buzdugan studied law at the University of Bucharest, after which he served as a judge. Assigned to Piatra Neamț in early 1892, he was transferred to Râmnicu Sărat late that year. He later moved to Galați, serving until 1900, when he was sent to Dorohoi. He also worked in Brăila. He reached Bucharest in 1902, joining the appeals court in 1905, and the High Court of Cassation and Justice in 1910. He became section president there in 1919, and was overall president from 1924 to 1927.

He resigned from the magistracy in order to become a member of the regency (alongside Prince Nicholas and Patriarch Miron Cristea) acting on behalf of the minor King Michael. Elected an honorary member of the Romanian Academy in 1929, he died the same year, being replaced by Constantin Sărățeanu.

After lying in state at the Romanian Athenaeum, Buzdugan was buried in the family crypt at Faraoani, Bacău County. A nearby village was renamed Gheorghe Buzdugan; this lasted until the early communist regime, which called the place Gheorghe Doja.
