= Constantin Sărățeanu =

Romanian judge and politician (1862-1935)

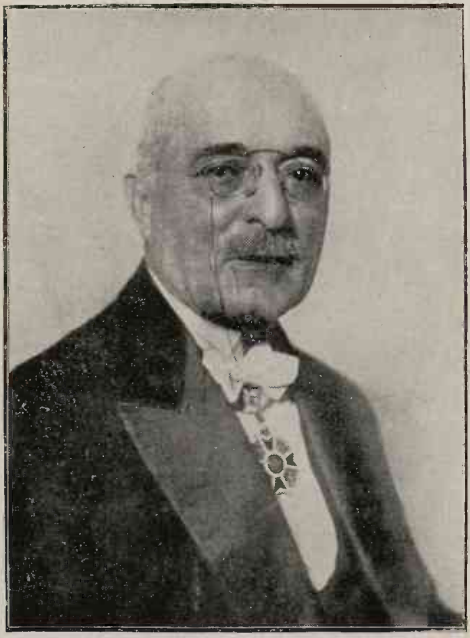
- Sărățeanu in 1929

Regent of Romania
- In office 9 October 1929 – 8 June 1930
- Monarch: Michael I
- Prime Minister: Iuliu Maniu
- Preceded by: Gheorghe Buzdugan

Minister of the Interior
- In office 29 January 1918 – 4 March 1918
- Monarch: Ferdinand I
- Prime Minister: Alexandru Averescu
- Preceded by: Alexandru C. Constantinescu
- Succeeded by: Alexandru Marghiloman

Personal details
- Born: June 18, 1862 Buzău, Romanian United Principalities
- Died: May 23, 1935 (aged 72) Bucharest, Romania

Constantin Sărățeanu (18 June 1862 - 23 May 1935) was a Romanian politician and judge who served on the regency council of Michael I in his first reign.

Born in Buzău, Sărățeanu was educated in Bucharest and pursued a legal career in the magistrate courts of Romania. He eventually became a counsellor at High Court of Cassation and Justice - Romania's highest court - and also had a short political career that saw him serve as the Minister of the Interior for a few months in 1918. In 1929, he was elected to replace Gheorghe Buzdugan on the regency council of the child King Michael I, but was widely seen as too obedient to Prime Minister Luliu Maniu. In his appointment, he promised to not oppose Prince Carol if he sought the throne. In June 1930, Carol became King and the regency council was dissolved. Historian Cristian Manolachi characterised Sărățeanu as obedient and dull, with very little charisma.

== Biography ==
=== Early life ===
Sărățeanu was born on 18 June 1862 in the town of Buzău. His father was Constantin D. Sărăţeanu and he served as the prosecutor general at the High Court of Cassation and Justice. Sărăţeanu received his secondary education in the Romanian capital Bucharest at the prestigious Saint Sava National College. He studied law at the University of Bucharest and graduated in the legal sciences.

=== Magistracy and Minister of the Interior ===
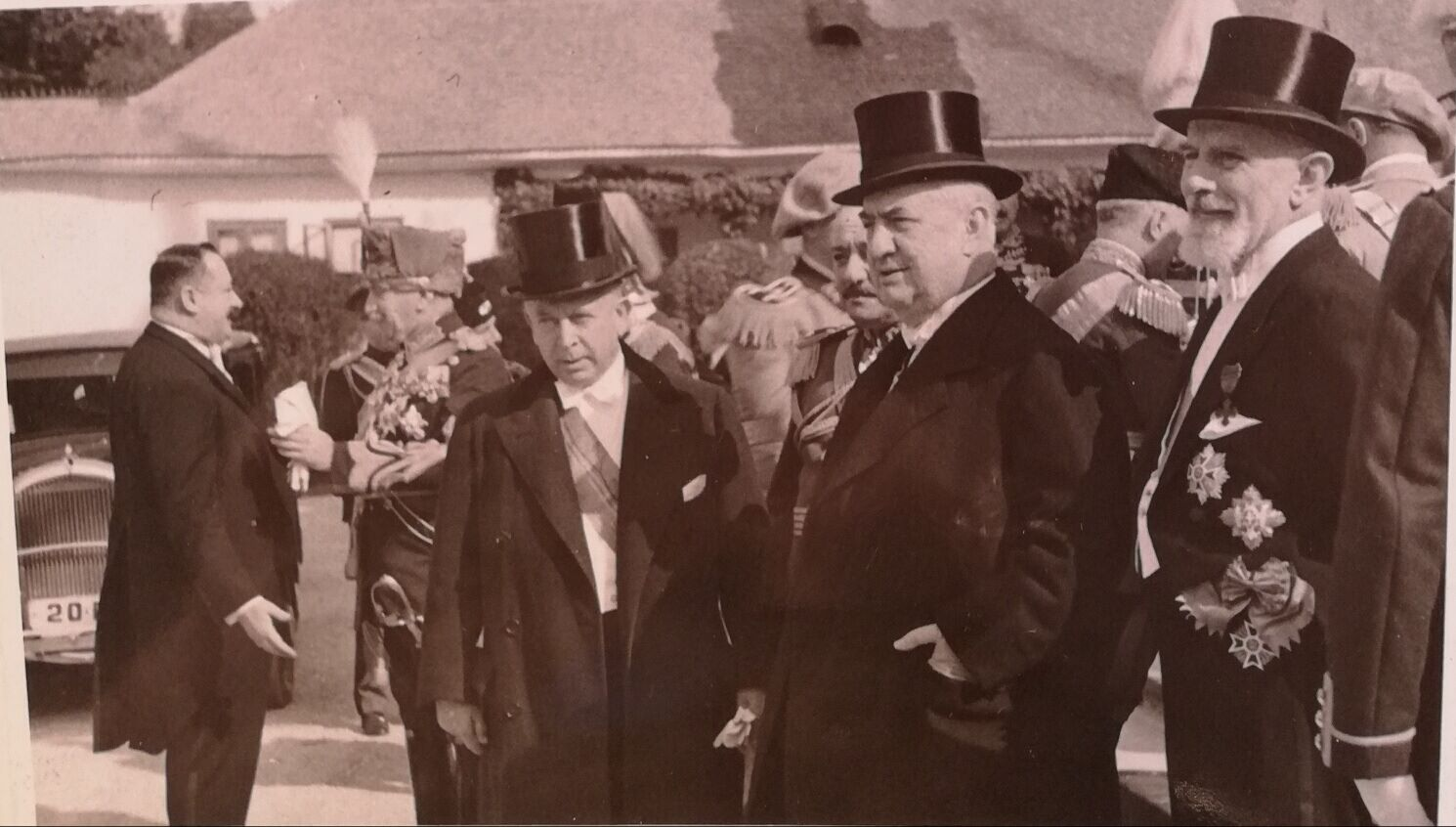
Sărăţeanu in the front at the centre between Averescu and Ioan Culcer in 1918, at the investiture ceremony of Averescu's government.

After graduating, Sărățeanu made a career in the magistracy, serving on several tribunals. He first served in 1887 as a substitute judge at the Râmnicu Sărat Tribunal. He became a prosecutor at the Vlaşca Tribunal in 1890, an investigating judge at the Ilfov Tribunal in 1892, the first prosecutor at the Covurlui Tribunal in 1896, and a prosecutor at the Iași Court of Appeal in January 1900. In 1901, Sărățeanu joined the National Liberal Party and was elected a deputy in the 1901 general election. He served in the Chamber of Deputies for a single term and did not seek re-election in the 1905 general election. Instead, Sărățeanu returned to Romania's magistracy and became President of the Iași Court of Appeal until he was promoted to counsellor at the High Court of Cassation and Justice.

Sărăţeanu was appointed Minister of the Interior in the cabinet of Prime Minister Alexandru Averescu on 29 January 1918. At the time, large swaths of Romania were occupied by the Central Powers following the Romanian Campaign of World War I. The main task of Averescu's government was signing an armistice with the Central Powers. Armistice negotiations yielded little results as Averescu was strongly opposed to their demands. He and his cabinet resigned and Sărățeanu resumed his role at the High Court.

=== Regent of Romania ===
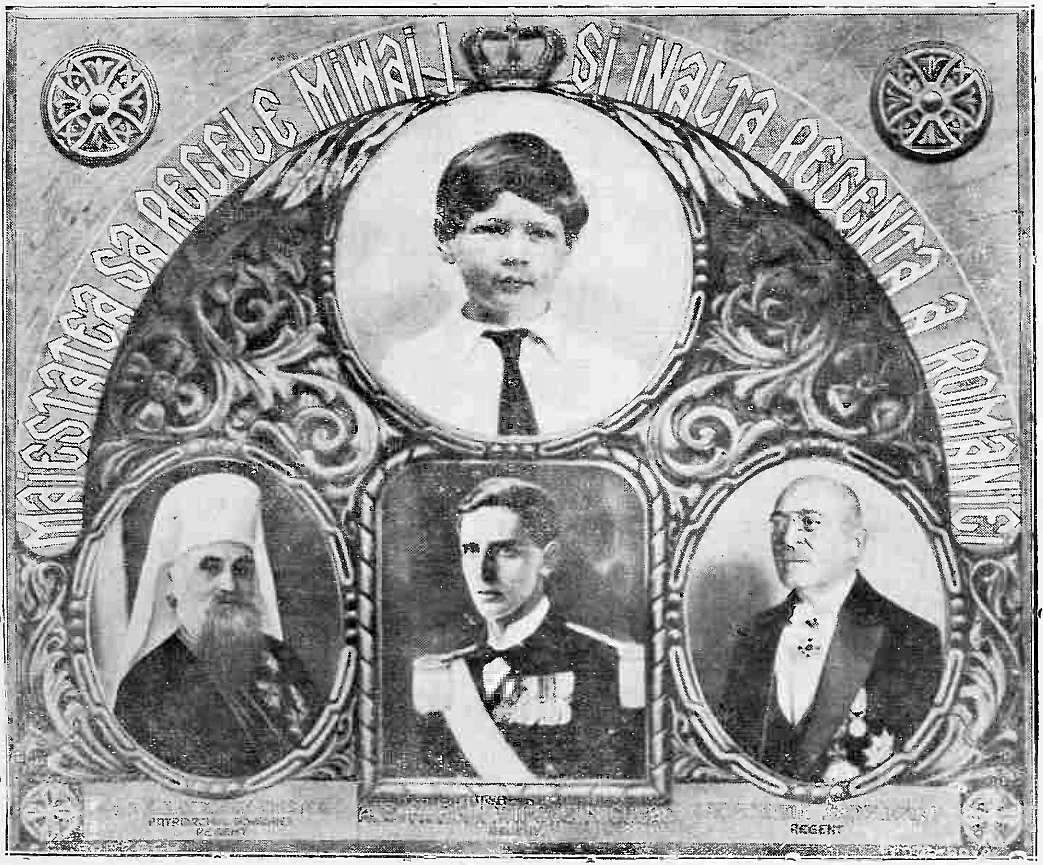
King Michael I (top), Miron Cristea (left), Prince Nicholas (middle), and Sărățeanu (right)

Ferdinand I, King of Romania, died on 20 July 1927 and was succeeded by his five-year-old grandson Michael I. Michael had served as Crown Prince since his father, Carol, was pressured to renounce his rights to the throne in 1925 as a result of his controversial relationship with Magda Lupescu. A regency council was formed to function on Michael's behalf and included his uncle Prince Nicholas, Orthodox patriarch Miron Cristea, and Chief Justice Gheorghe Buzdugan as regents.

When Buzdugan died on 7 October 1929, Parliament met two days later to elect a new regent to replace him. They elected Sărățeanu at the suggestion of Prime Minister Luliu Maniu. His election was opposed by the Parliament's opposition parties. Ion G. Duca of the National Liberal Party stated that "Maniu's attempt to lower the Regency to the level of party and family combinations remains and constitutes a serious damage to an institution which, by its nature, must be a supreme arbiter outside and above all political parties." Sărățeanu himself had personal ties to the incumbent National Peasant's Party (PNŢ). His brother-in-law was PNŢ Vice-president Mihai Popovici, who closely collaborated with Maniu. A large reasoning behind why Maniu supported Sărățeanu was because he did not oppose Prince Carol becoming King, which Maniu would work to help bring about. In 1936, he stated that Sărățeanu had promised Maniu that "if the Romanian nation wanted [Prince Carol], he would not oppose it." Additionally, Maniu appreciated Sărățeanu's professionalism. As said by contemporary politician Nicolae Iorga, he was an "illustrious unknown" who had the "advantage" of being a relative of Popovici.

However, Sărățeanu's appointment harmed public reception of the regency, now viewed as subordinate to the incumbent PNŢ led by Maniu. His erased personality and bibliophile manner also did not help the regency council's cohesion and public appearance. Cristea had confessed to Iorga that the "regency does not work because it has no head. [Prince Nicholas] smokes his cigarettes, Sărăţeanu examines the books, I, a priest, can only try to reconcile." Pompiliu Mureşan described the regent Sărățeanu as "a tall and dry old man who barely speaks. It gives the impression that he has long since lost if not its memory, its control over it. He's a man with one foot in the hole. Embarrassing, Luliu Maniu, however, is satisfied. From now on he has a serious foot in the Regency. The mannequin will play as he will pull the strings from behind the scenes. It's just what Luliu Maniu needs."

On 6 June 1930, Prince Carol returned to Romania and staged a coup with the support of Maniu's government, usurping the throne from his son and becoming King Carol II on June 8. Subsequently, the regency council was dissolved. Sărăţeanu resumed his legal career after the regency, up until his death on 23 May 1935.
