= Michael I of Romania =

King of Romania (r. 1927–1930, 1940–1947)

Michael I
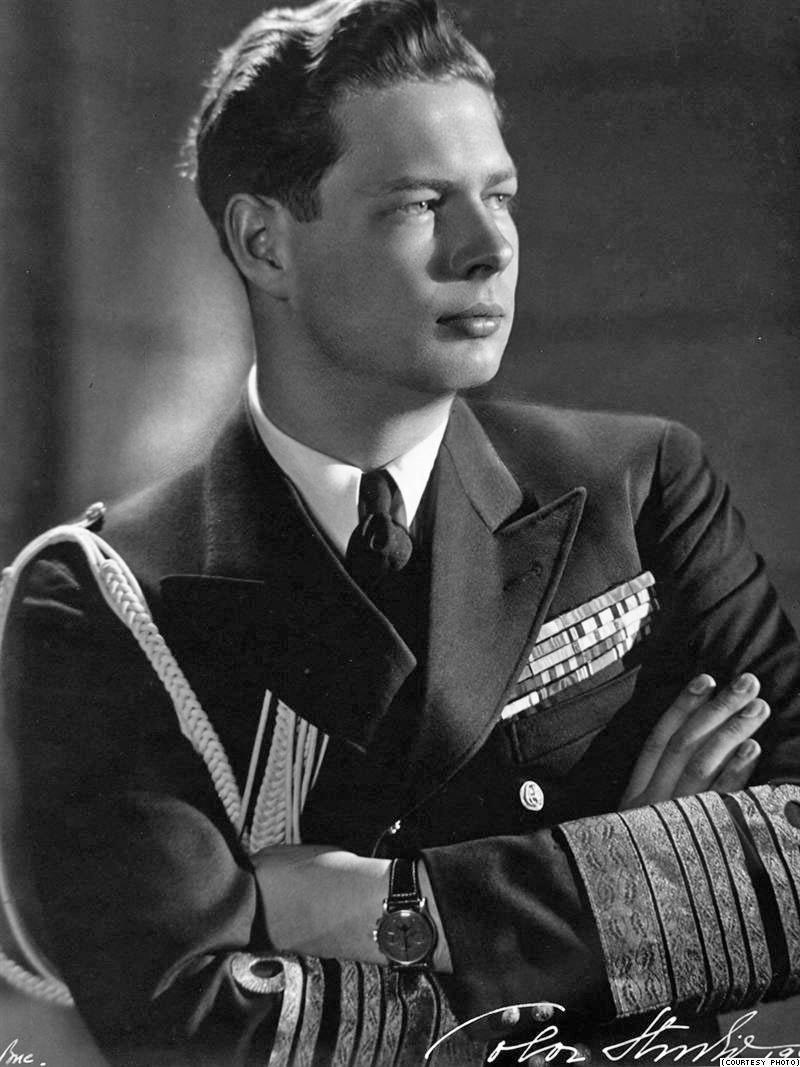
- Michael I in 1947

King of Romania
- First reign: 20 July 1927 – 8 June 1930
- Predecessor: Ferdinand I
- Successor: Carol II
- Regents: See list: Prince Nicholas (1927–1930); Miron Cristea (1927–1930); Gheorghe Buzdugan (1927–1929); Constantin Sărăţeanu (1929–1930)
- Second reign: 6 September 1940 – 30 December 1947
- Coronation: 6 September 1940
- Predecessor: Carol II
- Successor: Monarchy abolished; Constantin Ion Parhon as President of the Provisional Presidium of the Republic

Head of the House of Romania
- Tenure: 30 December 1947 – 5 December 2017
- Successor: Margareta
- Born: 25 October 1921; Peleș Castle, Sinaia, Romania
- Died: 5 December 2017 (aged 96); Aubonne, Switzerland
- Burial: 16 December 2017; Royal Cathedral, Curtea de Argeș Monastery, Curtea de Argeș, Romania
- Spouse: Anne of Bourbon-Parma (m. 1948; died 2016)
- Issue: Margareta, Custodian of the Crown of Romania; Princess Elena; Princess Irina; Princess Sofia; Princess Maria
- House: Romania (from 2011); Hohenzollern-Sigmaringen (until 2011)
- Father: Carol II of Romania
- Mother: Helen of Greece and Denmark

Michael I (Romanian: Mihai I Romanian: [miˈhaj ɨnˈtɨj]; 25 October 1921 – 5 December 2017) was the last king of Romania, reigning from 20 July 1927 to 8 June 1930 and again from 6 September 1940 until his forced abdication on 30 December 1947.

Shortly after Michael's birth, his father, Crown Prince Carol, had become involved in a controversial relationship with Magda Lupescu. In 1925, Carol was pressured to renounce his rights (in favour of his son Michael) to the throne and moved to Paris in exile with Lupescu. In July 1927, following the death of his grandfather Ferdinand I, Michael ascended the throne at age five, the youngest crowned head in Europe. As Michael was still a minor, a regency council was instituted, composed of his uncle Prince Nicolas, Patriarch Miron Cristea and Chief Justice Gheorghe Buzdugan. The council proved to be ineffective and, in 1930, Carol returned to Romania and replaced his son as monarch, reigning as Carol II. As a result, Michael returned to being heir apparent to the throne and was given the additional title of Grand Voievod of Alba-Iulia.

Carol II was forced to abdicate in 1940, and Michael once again became king. Under the government led by the military dictator Ion Antonescu, Romania became aligned with Nazi Germany. In 1944, Michael participated in a coup against Antonescu, appointed Constantin Sănătescu as his replacement, and subsequently declared an alliance with the Allies. In March 1945, political pressures forced Michael to appoint a pro-Soviet government headed by Petru Groza. From August 1945 to January 1946, Michael went on a "royal strike" and unsuccessfully tried to oppose Groza's communist-controlled government by refusing to sign and endorse its decrees. In November 1947, Michael attended the wedding of his cousins, the future Queen Elizabeth II of the United Kingdom and Prince Philip of Greece and Denmark in London. Shortly thereafter, on the morning of 30 December 1947, Groza met with Michael and compelled him to abdicate, while the monarchy was abolished. Michael was forced into exile, his properties confiscated, and his citizenship stripped. In 1948, he married Princess Anne of Bourbon-Parma, with whom he had five daughters. The couple eventually settled in Switzerland.

Nicolae Ceaușescu's communist dictatorship was overthrown in December 1989, and the following year Michael attempted to return to Romania, only to be arrested and forced to leave upon arrival. In 1992, Michael was allowed to visit Romania for Easter, where he was greeted by huge crowds; a speech he gave from his hotel window drew an estimated one million people to Bucharest. Alarmed by Michael's popularity, the post-communist government of Ion Iliescu refused to allow him any further visits. In 1997, after Iliescu's defeat by Emil Constantinescu in the presidential election of the previous year, Michael's citizenship was restored and he was allowed to visit Romania again. Several confiscated properties, such as Peleș Castle and Săvârșin Castle, were eventually returned to his family.

== Early life ==
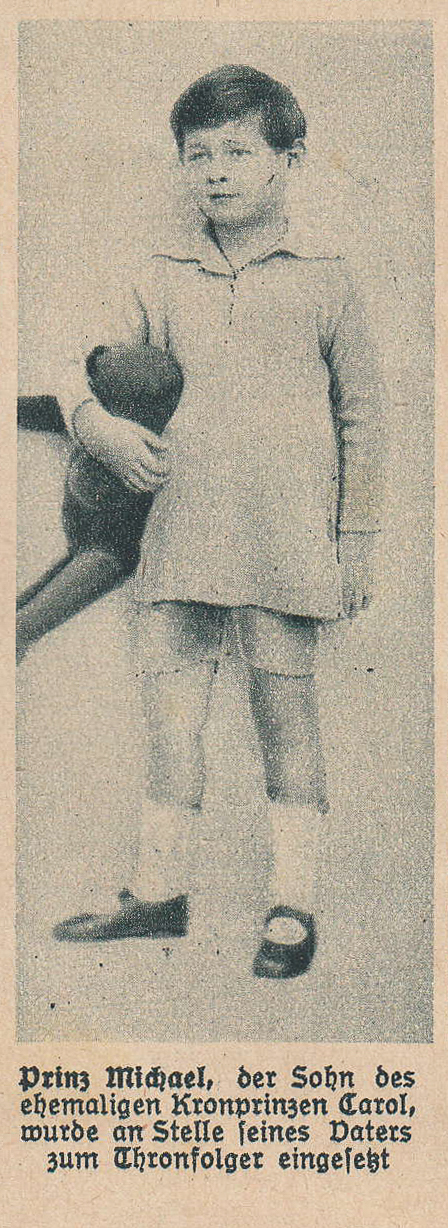
Prince Michael, aged 5

Michael was born in 1921 at Foișor Castle on the Royal Complex of Peleș in Sinaia, Romania, the son of Crown Prince Carol of Romania and Crown Princess Elena. He was born as the paternal grandson of the then reigning King Ferdinand I of Romania and maternal grandson of the then reigning King Constantine I of Greece. Michael's parents had married on 10 March 1921, and he was thus born just seven months after the wedding.

When Carol eloped with his mistress Elena Magda Lupescu and renounced his rights to the throne in December 1925, Michael was declared heir apparent. Michael succeeded to the throne of Romania upon Ferdinand's death in July 1927, before his sixth birthday. Later, Michael attended a special school established in 1932 by his father.

== Reign ==
=== 1930s and the Antonescu era ===
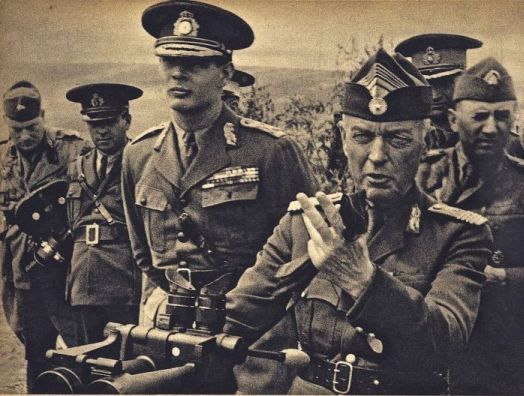
King Michael and General Ion Antonescu on the banks of the Prut River, 1941

A regency, which included his uncle, Prince Nicolae, Patriarch Miron Cristea, and the country's Chief Justice (Gheorghe Buzdugan, and from October 1929, Constantin Sărăţeanu) functioned on behalf of the five-year-old Michael, when he succeeded Ferdinand in 1927. Notably, Queen Maria was absent from the regency, despite having been a figure of authority until then. The oath was taken before parliament on 20 July 1927. The main political parties had different attitudes toward the regency: the National Liberal Party supported it, while the National Peasants' Party even discussed the possibility of bringing Carol II back to the country. In 1930, Carol II returned to the country at the invitation of politicians dissatisfied with the regency in the context of the Great Depression, and was proclaimed king by the Parliament. Michael was demoted to crown prince with the title "Grand Voivode of Alba Iulia". This title had been proposed by Mihail Manoilescu and provoked protests in parliament from Nicolae Iorga. Following his father's restoration, Michael's mother was exiled to Florence, and a strict visiting regime was imposed, allowing her to see her son only for a few weeks each year. In November 1939, Michael joined the Romanian Senate, as the 1938 Constitution guaranteed him a seat there upon reaching the age of eighteen.

Just days after the Second Vienna Award, the pro-Nazi anti-Soviet regime of Prime Minister Marshal Ion Antonescu staged a coup d'état against Carol II, whom he claimed to be "anti-German". Antonescu suspended the Constitution, dissolved the Parliament, and re-installed the 18-year-old Michael as king, by popular acclaim in September 1940. (Although the Constitution was restored in 1944, and the Romanian Parliament in 1946, Michael did not subsequently take a formal oath nor have his reign approved retroactively by Parliament.) Michael was crowned with the Steel Crown and anointed King of Romania by the Orthodox Patriarch of Romania, Nicodim Munteanu, in the Patriarchal Cathedral of Bucharest, on the day of his accession, 6 September 1940. Although King Michael was formally the Supreme Head of the Army, named Conducător ("Leader of the people"), and entitled to appoint the Prime Minister with full powers, in reality he was forced to remain a figurehead for most of the war, until August 1944. Michael had lunch with Adolf Hitler twice—once with his father in Bavaria in 1937, and with his mother in Berlin in 1941. He also met Benito Mussolini in Italy in 1941.

=== Turning against Nazi Germany ===
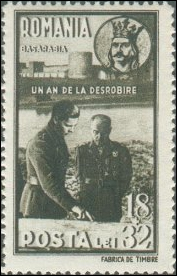
Romanian stamp from 1942, commemorating the first anniversary of the recapture of Bessarabia from Soviet occupation, featuring Michael and dictator Antonescu below the text Un an de la desrobire ("A year since liberation"), a portrait of Stephen the Great and the fortress of Bender in the background

By 1944, the military situation in World War II had deteriorated significantly for the Axis powers, but Antonescu remained in control of Romania. By August 1944, the Soviet conquest of Romania had become inevitable, and was expected in a few months. On 23 August 1944, Michael joined the pro-Allies politicians, a number of army officers, and armed Communist-led civilians in staging a coup against Antonescu. Michael ordered his arrest by the Royal Palace Guard. On the same night, the new Prime Minister, Lt. General Constantin Sănătescu—appointed by King Michael—gave custody of Antonescu to the communists (in spite of alleged instructions to the contrary by the King), and the latter delivered him to the Soviets on 1 September. In a radio broadcast to the Romanian nation and army, Michael issued a ceasefire just as the Red Army was penetrating the Moldavian front, proclaimed Romania's loyalty to the Allies, announced the acceptance of the armistice offered by the United Kingdom, the United States, and the Soviet Union, and declared war on Germany. However, this did not avert a rapid Soviet occupation and capture of about 130,000 Romanian soldiers, who were transported to the Soviet Union where many perished in prison camps.

Although the country's alliance with Nazi Germany was ended, the coup sped the Red Army's advance into Romania. The armistice was signed three weeks later on 12 September 1944, on terms the Soviets virtually dictated. Under the terms of the armistice, Romania recognized its defeat by the USSR and was placed under occupation of the Allied forces, with the Soviets, as their representative, in control of media, communication, post, and civil administration behind the front. The coup effectively amounted to a "capitulation", an "unconditional" "surrender". It has been suggested by Romanian historians that the coup may have shortened World War II by six months, thus saving hundreds of thousands of lives.

At the end of the war, King Michael was awarded the highest degree (Chief Commander) of the American Legion of Merit by U.S. President Harry S. Truman. He was also decorated with the Soviet Order of Victory by Joseph Stalin "for the courageous act of the radical change in Romania's politics towards a break-up from Hitler's Germany and an alliance with the United Nations, at the moment when there was no clear sign yet of Germany's defeat", according to the official description of the decoration. With the death of Michał Rola-Żymierski in 1989, Michael became the sole surviving recipient of the Order of Victory.

=== Reign under Communism ===
In March 1945, political pressures forced King Michael to appoint a pro-Soviet government headed by Petru Groza. For the next two-plus years, Michael functioned again as little more than a figurehead. Between August 1945 and January 1946, during what was later known as the "royal strike", King Michael tried unsuccessfully to oppose the Groza government by refusing to sign its decrees. In response to Soviet, British, and American pressures, King Michael eventually gave up his opposition to the communist government and stopped demanding its resignation.

He did not pardon Mareșal Antonescu, the former Prime Minister, who was sentenced to death "for betrayal of the Romanian people for the benefit of Nazi Germany, for the economic and political subjugation of Romania to Germany, for cooperation with the Iron Guard, for murdering his political opponents, for the mass murder of civilians and crimes against peace". Nor did King Michael manage to save such leaders of the opposition as Iuliu Maniu and the Bratianus, victims of Communist political trials, as the Constitution prevented him from doing so without the counter-signature of Communist Justice Minister Lucrețiu Pătrășcanu (who himself was later eliminated by Gheorghiu-Dej's opposing Communist faction). The memoirs of King Michael's aunt Princess Ileana quoted Emil Bodnăraș—her alleged lover, Romania's Communist minister of defence, and a Soviet spy—as saying: "Well, if the King decides not to sign the death warrant, I promise that we will uphold his point of view." Princess Ileana was sceptical: "You know quite well (...) that the King will never of his free will sign such an unconstitutional document. If he does, it will be laid at your door, and before the whole nation your government will bear the blame. Surely you do not wish this additional handicap at this moment!"

=== Forced abdication ===
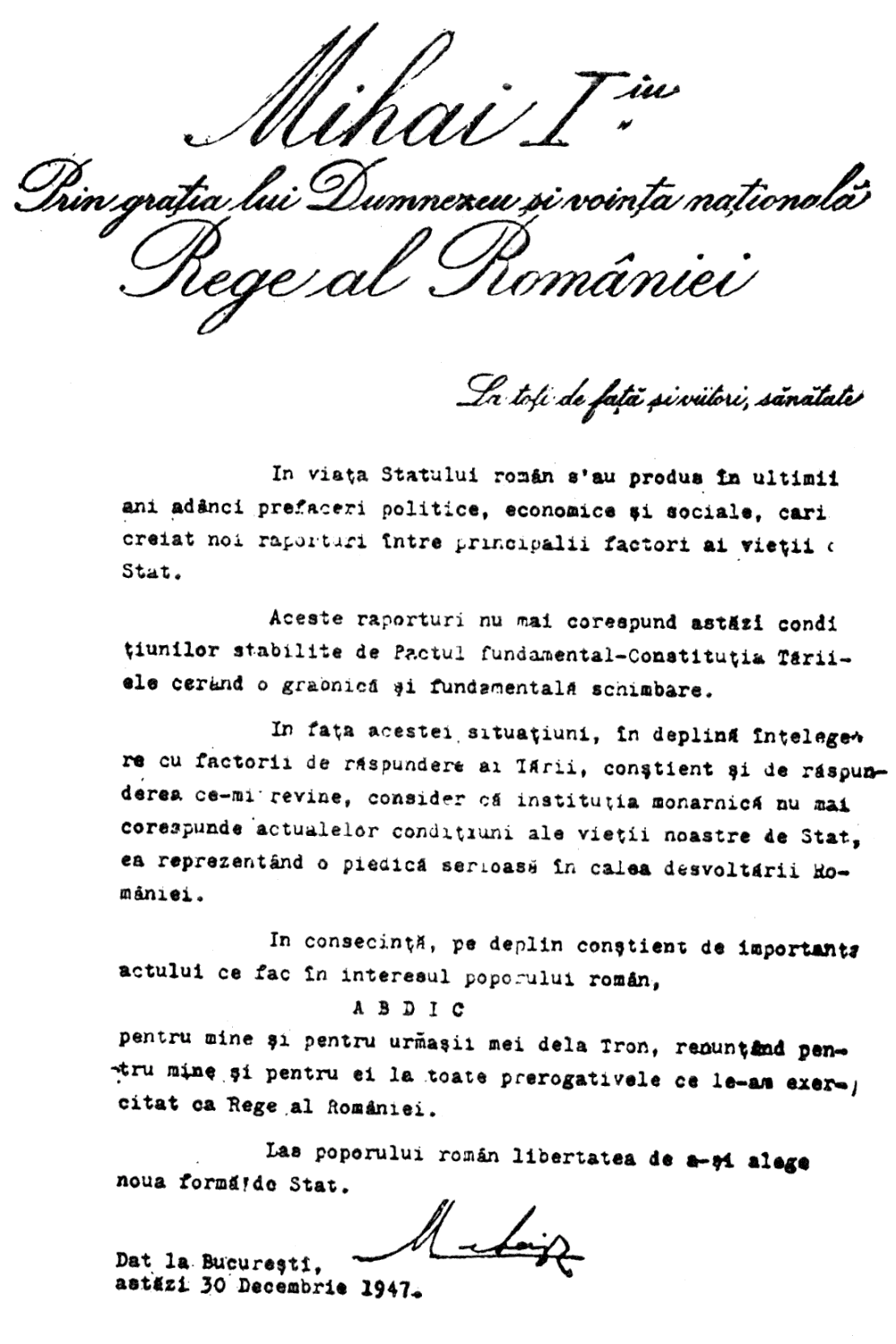
Abdication act, 1947

In November 1947, King Michael travelled to London for the wedding of his cousins, Princess Elizabeth (later Queen Elizabeth II) and Prince Philip of Greece and Denmark, an occasion during which he met Princess Anne of Bourbon-Parma (his second cousin once removed), who was to become his wife. According to his own account, King Michael rejected any offers of asylum and decided to return to Romania, contrary to the confidential, strong advice of the British Ambassador to Romania.

Early on the morning of 30 December 1947, Michael was preparing for a New Year's party at Peleș Castle in Sinaia, when Groza summoned him back to Bucharest. Michael returned to Elisabeta Palace in Bucharest, to find it surrounded by troops from the Tudor Vladimirescu Division, an army unit completely loyal to the Communists. Groza and Communist Party leader Gheorghe Gheorghiu-Dej were waiting for him, and demanded that he sign a pre-typed instrument of abdication. Unable to call in loyal troops, due to his telephone lines allegedly being cut, Michael signed the document. Later the same day, the Communist-dominated government announced the abolition of the monarchy, and its replacement by a People's Republic, broadcasting the King's pre-recorded radio proclamation of his own abdication. On 3 January 1948, Michael was forced to leave the country, followed over a week later by Princesses Elisabeth and Ileana, who collaborated so closely with the Soviets that they became known as the King's "Red Aunts". He was the last monarch behind the Iron Curtain to lose his throne.

Michael's own account of the abdication varied over time, and was gradually embellished, especially after 1990. Thus, in accounts published in 1950 and 1977, Michael only mentioned seeing armed groups with machine-guns on their shoulders around the palace, while in much later accounts these were described as "heavy artillery, ready to fire at any moment". The story of the supposed blackmail also evolved: in the 1950 account, Groza tried to negotiate some form of material compensations for the abdication, noting he could not guarantee for Michael's life in case he refused, and his refusal could lead to thousands of arrests and possibly a civil war; in a hearing before the United States House of Representatives in 1954, Michael mentioned Groza's generic threats regarding his personal security, bloodshed and ruin of the country, as well as "vague hints" of persecution, with Groza suggesting the government had a large dossier on Michael; the possible arrest of thousands and a generic threat of bloodshed is also mentioned in the 1977 account; however, beginning with 1990, Michael claimed that Groza threatened to shoot 1,000 students that had already been arrested for publicly showing their attachment to the throne. Thus, while according to a Time article published in 1948, Groza threatened to arrest thousands of people and order a bloodbath unless Michael abdicated, in an interview with The New York Times from 2007, Michael recounted: "It was blackmail. They said, 'If you don't sign this immediately we are obliged'—why obliged I don't know—'to kill more than 1,000 students' that they had in prison." In historian Ioan Scurtu's opinion, the new account was created in order to leverage the recent Revolution of 1989, presented at the time as a revolution of the youth and the students. Another new element in Michael's account after 1990 was that Groza had threatened him at gunpoint; in earlier accounts Michael mentioned that Groza had shown him the pistol he was carrying only after Michael signed the abdication.

According to the autobiography of the former head of the Soviet intelligence agency NKVD, Major General Pavel Sudoplatov, the Deputy Soviet Foreign Commissar Andrey Vyshinsky personally conducted negotiations with King Michael for his abdication, guaranteeing part of a pension to be paid to Michael in Mexico. According to a few articles in Jurnalul Național, Michael's abdication was negotiated with the Communist government, which allowed him to leave the country with the goods he requested, accompanied by some of the royal retinue.

According to Albanian Communist leader Enver Hoxha's account of his conversations with the Romanian Communist leaders on the monarch's abdication, it was Gheorghiu-Dej, not Groza, who forced Michael's abdication at gunpoint. He was allowed to leave the country accompanied by some of his entourage and, as confirmed also by the Soviet leader Nikita Khrushchev recounting Gheorghiu-Dej's confessions, with whatever properties he desired, including gold and rubies. Hoxha also wrote that pro-Communist troops surrounded the palace, to counter army units who were still loyal to the King.

In March 1948, Michael denounced his abdication as illegal, and contended he was still the rightful King of Romania. According to Time magazine, he would have done so sooner, but for much of early 1948, he had been negotiating with the Communists over properties he had left in Romania.

There are reports that Romanian Communist authorities allowed King Michael to depart with 42 valuable Crown-owned paintings in November 1947, so that he would leave Romania faster. Some of these paintings were reportedly sold through the famed art dealer Daniel Wildenstein. One of the paintings belonging to the Romanian Crown, which was supposedly taken out of the country by King Michael in November 1947, returned to Romania in 2004 as a donation made by John Kreuger, the former husband of King Michael's daughter Irina.

In 2005, Romanian Prime Minister Călin Popescu-Tăriceanu denied these accusations about King Michael, stating that the Romanian government has no proof of any such action by King Michael and that, prior to 1949, the government had no official records of any artwork taken over from the former royal residences. However, according to some historians, such records existed as early as April 1948, having been, in fact, officially published in June 1948.

According to Ivor Porter's authorized biography, Michael of Romania: The King and The Country (2005), which quotes Queen Mother Helen's daily diary, the Romanian royal family took out paintings belonging to the Romanian Royal Crown, on their November 1947 trip to London to the wedding of the future Queen Elizabeth II; two of these paintings, signed by El Greco, were sold in 1976.

According to declassified Foreign Office documents that were the subject of news reports in 2005, when he left Romania, the exiled King Michael's only assets amounted to 500,000 Swiss francs. Recently declassified Soviet transcripts of talks between Joseph Stalin and the Romanian Prime Minister Petru Groza show that shortly before his abdication, King Michael received from the communist government assets amounting to 500,000 Swiss francs. King Michael, however, repeatedly denied that the Communist government had allowed him to take into exile any financial assets or valuable goods besides four personal automobiles loaded on two train cars.

== Marriage ==
=== Engagement ===
In November 1947, Michael I met a distant relative, Princess Anne of Bourbon-Parma, who was visiting London for the wedding of Princess Elizabeth and Philip Mountbatten, Duke of Edinburgh. A year before this, Queen Helen, the Queen Mother, had invited Princess Margaret of Denmark and her children, who included Anne, to make a visit to Bucharest, but the plan did not come off. Meanwhile, King Michael I had glimpsed Princess Anne in a newsreel and requested a photograph from the film footage.

She did not want to accompany her parents to London for the royal wedding as she wished to avoid meeting Michael I in official surroundings. Instead, she planned to stay behind, go alone to the Paris railway station and, pretending to be a passerby in the crowd, privately observe the king as his entourage escorted him to his London-bound train. However, at the last moment she was persuaded by her first cousin, Prince Jean, Hereditary Grand Duke of Luxembourg, to come to London, where he planned to host a party. Upon arrival in London, she stopped by Claridge's to see her parents, and found herself being introduced unexpectedly to King Michael I. Abashed to the point of confusion, she clicked her heels instead of curtseying, and fled in embarrassment. Charmed, the king saw her again the night of the wedding at the Luxembourg embassy soirée, confided in her some of his concerns about the Communist takeover of Romania and fears for his mother's safety, and nicknamed her Nan. They saw each other several times thereafter on outings in London, always chaperoned by her mother or brother.

A few days later, she accepted an invitation to accompany Michael and his mother when he piloted a Beechcraft aeroplane to take his aunt Princess Irene, Duchess of Aosta, back home to Lausanne. Sixteen days after meeting, Michael proposed to Anne while the couple were out on a drive in Lausanne. She initially declined, but later accepted after taking long walks and drives with him. Although Michael gave her an engagement ring a few days later, he felt obliged to refrain from a public announcement until he informed his government, despite the fact that the press besieged them in anticipation.

Michael I returned to Romania, where he was told by the prime minister that a wedding announcement was not "opportune". Yet within days it was used as the government's public explanation for Michael's sudden "abdication", when in fact the king was deposed by the Communists on 30 December. Princess Anne was unable to get further news of King Michael I until he left the country. They finally reunited in Davos on 23 January 1948.

=== Wedding ===
As a Bourbon, Anne was bound by the canon law of the Roman Catholic Church, which required that she receive a dispensation to marry a non-Catholic Christian (King Michael I was Orthodox). At the time, such a dispensation was normally only given if the non-Roman Catholic partner promised to allow the children of the marriage to be raised as Roman Catholics. Michael refused to make this promise since it would have violated Romania's monarchical constitution, and would be likely to have a detrimental impact upon any possible restoration. The Holy See (which handled the matter directly since King Michael I was a member of a reigning dynasty) refused to grant the dispensation unless Michael made the required promise.

Helen, Queen Mother of Romania and her sister Princess Irene, Duchess of Aosta (an Orthodox married to a Catholic Prince) met with the fiancée's parents in Paris, where the two families resolved to take their case to the Vatican in person. In early March, the couple's mothers met with Pope Pius XII who, despite the entreaties of the Queen Mother and the fact that Anne's mother, Princess Margaret, pounded her fist on the table in anger, refused permission for Anne to marry King Michael I.

It has been surmised that the Pope's refusal was, in part, motivated by the fact that when Princess Giovanna of Savoy married Anne's cousin, King Boris III of Bulgaria, in 1930, the couple had undertaken to raise their future children as Roman Catholics, but had baptized them in the Orthodox faith in deference to Bulgaria's state religion. However, King Michael I declined to make a promise he could not keep politically, while Anne's mother was herself the daughter of a mixed marriage between a Catholic (Princess Marie d'Orléans) and a Protestant (Prince Valdemar of Denmark), who had abided by their pre-ne temere compromise to raise their sons as Protestant and their daughter, Margaret, as Catholic.

Although under a great deal of stress, the engaged couple resolved to proceed. Anne's paternal uncle, Prince Xavier of Bourbon-Parma, issued a statement objecting to any marriage conducted against the will of the Pope and the bride's family. It was he, not the Pontiff, who forbade Anne's parents to attend the wedding. King Michael I's spokesman declared on 9 June that the parents had been asked and had given their consent, and that the bride's family would be represented at the nuptials by her maternal uncle, the Protestant Prince Erik of Denmark, who was to give the bride away.

The wedding ceremony was held on 10 June 1948 in Athens, Greece, in the throne room of the Royal Palace; the ceremony was performed by Archbishop Damaskinos, and Michael's maternal uncle King Paul I of Greece served as koumbaros. Guests at the wedding included: Michael's mother The Queen Mother of Romania, aunts Queen Frederica, The Dowager Duchess of Aosta, Lady Katherine Brandram; cousins Prince Amedeo, 5th Duke of Aosta, Princess Sophia of Greece and Denmark, Crown Prince Constantine of Greece and Princess Irene of Greece and Denmark, the three youngest ones serving as bridesmaids and pageboy; Anne's maternal uncle Prince Erik of Denmark; Michael's grandaunt Grand Duchess Elena Vladimirovna of Russia, Princess Olga of Greece and Denmark, Princess Elizabeth of Yugoslavia, Prince George Wilhelm of Hanover and many other dignitaries. King Michael I's father, Carol, and his sisters, Maria, Queen Mother of Yugoslavia, Princess Elisabeth of Romania (ex-Queen Consort of Greece) and Princess Ileana of Romania were notified, but not invited.

As no papal dispensation was given for the marriage, when it was celebrated according to the rites of the Eastern Orthodox Church, it was deemed invalid by the Roman Catholic Church, but perfectly legal by every other authority. The couple eventually took part in a religious ceremony again, on 9 November 1966, at the Roman Catholic Church of St Charles in Monaco, thus satisfying Roman Catholic canon law.

=== Family ===
Michael and Anne had five daughters:

- Margareta, Custodian of the Crown of Romania (b. 26 March 1949), married Radu Duda in 1996.
- Princess Elena of Romania (b. 15 November 1950), married Robin Medforth-Mills on 20 July 1983 and was divorced on 28 November 1991. They have two children. She married secondly Alexander McAteer on 14 August 1998.
- Princess Irina of Romania (b. 28 February 1953), married John Kreuger on 4 October 1983, from whom she was divorced on 24 November 2003. They have two children. She married secondly John Wesley Walker on 10 November 2007. In August 2013, Irina and Walker were arrested for being part of an illegal cockfighting ring and federally charged with operating an illegal gambling business on their ranch near Irrigon, Oregon. In October 2014, they pleaded guilty to operating an illegal gambling business and were sentenced to three years of probation. On 29 October 2014, Michael altered the line of succession, stripping Irina of her royal titles and removing her and all of her descendants from the line of succession. In September 2020, Irina's sister, Margareta, reinstated her titles.
- Princess Sofia of Romania (b. 29 October 1957), married Alain Michel Biarneix on 29 August 1998 and was divorced in 2002, with one child.
- Princess Maria of Romania (b. 13 July 1964), married Kazimierz Wiesław Mystkowski on 16 September 1995 and divorced in December 2003.

== Life in exile ==
Michael would never see his father again, after Carol II's 1940 abdication. Michael could see no point in meeting his father who had humiliated his mother so many times via his open affairs and did not attend his father's funeral in 1953.

In January 1948, Michael began using one of his family's ancestral titles, "Prince of Hohenzollern", instead of using the title of "King of Romania". After denouncing his abdication as forced and illegal in March 1948, Michael resumed use of the kingly title. In June 1948, he married Princess Anne of Bourbon-Parma.

Michael and Princess Anne lived near Florence, Italy, until 1948, near Lausanne, Switzerland, until 1950, and then in Hertfordshire, England, until 1956. After that, the couple settled near Versoix, Switzerland, where they would live for the next 45 years. The Communist Romanian authorities stripped Michael of his Romanian citizenship in 1948.

During exile, Michael had a variety of occupations including farming, stockbroker, entrepreneur, and pilot. In 1957, he worked in Switzerland as a test pilot for a predecessor of aerospace manufacturer Learjet.

Together with his wife, he took part in the ship tour organized by Queen Frederica and her husband King Paul of Greece in 1954, which became known as the “Cruise of the Kings” and was attended by over 100 royals from all over Europe.

He had five daughters with his wife between 1949 and 1964.

== Return and rehabilitation ==
On 25 December 1990—a year after the revolution which overthrew the dictatorship of Nicolae Ceaușescu—Michael, accompanied by several members of the royal family, landed at Otopeni Airport and entered Romania for the first time in 43 years. Using a Danish diplomatic passport, Michael was able to obtain a 24-hour visa. He intended to reach Curtea de Argeș Cathedral, pray at the tombs of his royal ancestors and attend the Christmas religious service. However, on their way to Curtea de Argeș, the former King and his companions were stopped by a police blockade, taken to the airport and forced to leave the country.

In 1992, the Romanian government allowed Michael to return to Romania for Easter celebrations, where he drew large crowds. His speech from the balcony of a Hotel Continental 1st Fl. room drew over 100,000 people. His visit in Bucharest drew over a million people in the streets of the capital to see him. Michael refused the offer of the president of the National Liberal Party, Radu Câmpeanu, to run for elections as president of Romania. Michael's popularity alarmed the government of President Ion Iliescu, and he was forbidden to re-visit Romania, being denied entry twice in 1994 and 1995.

In 1997, after Iliescu's defeat by Emil Constantinescu, the Romanian government restored Michael's citizenship and again allowed him to visit the country. He then lived partly in Switzerland at Aubonne and partly in Romania, either at Săvârșin Castle in Arad County or in an official residence in Bucharest—the Elisabeta Palace—voted by the Romanian Parliament by a law concerning arrangements for former heads of state. Besides Săvârșin Castle, the former private residences Peleș Castle and Pelișor Castle were also restituted. While Peleș and Pelișor are open to the public, Elisabeta Palace and Săvârșin are used as private residences.

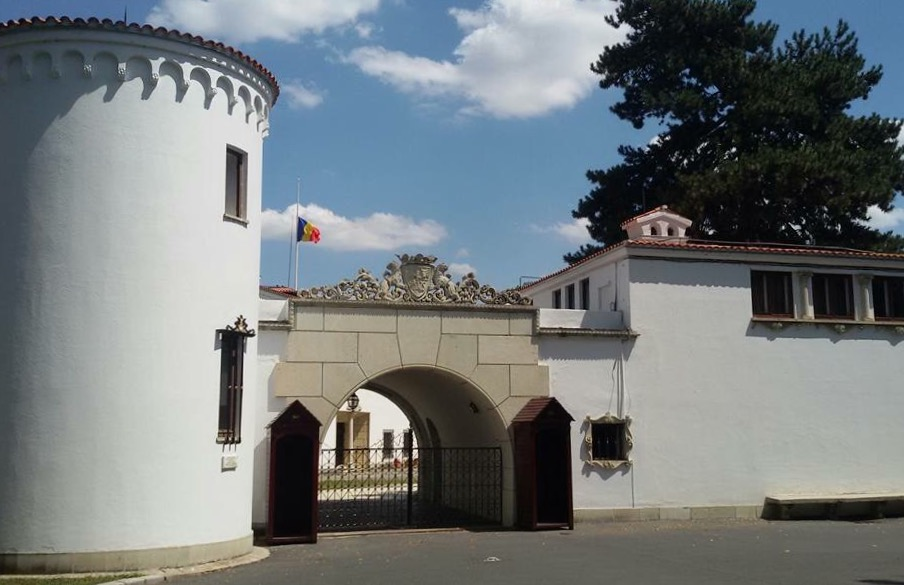
Elisabeta Palace, Bucharest

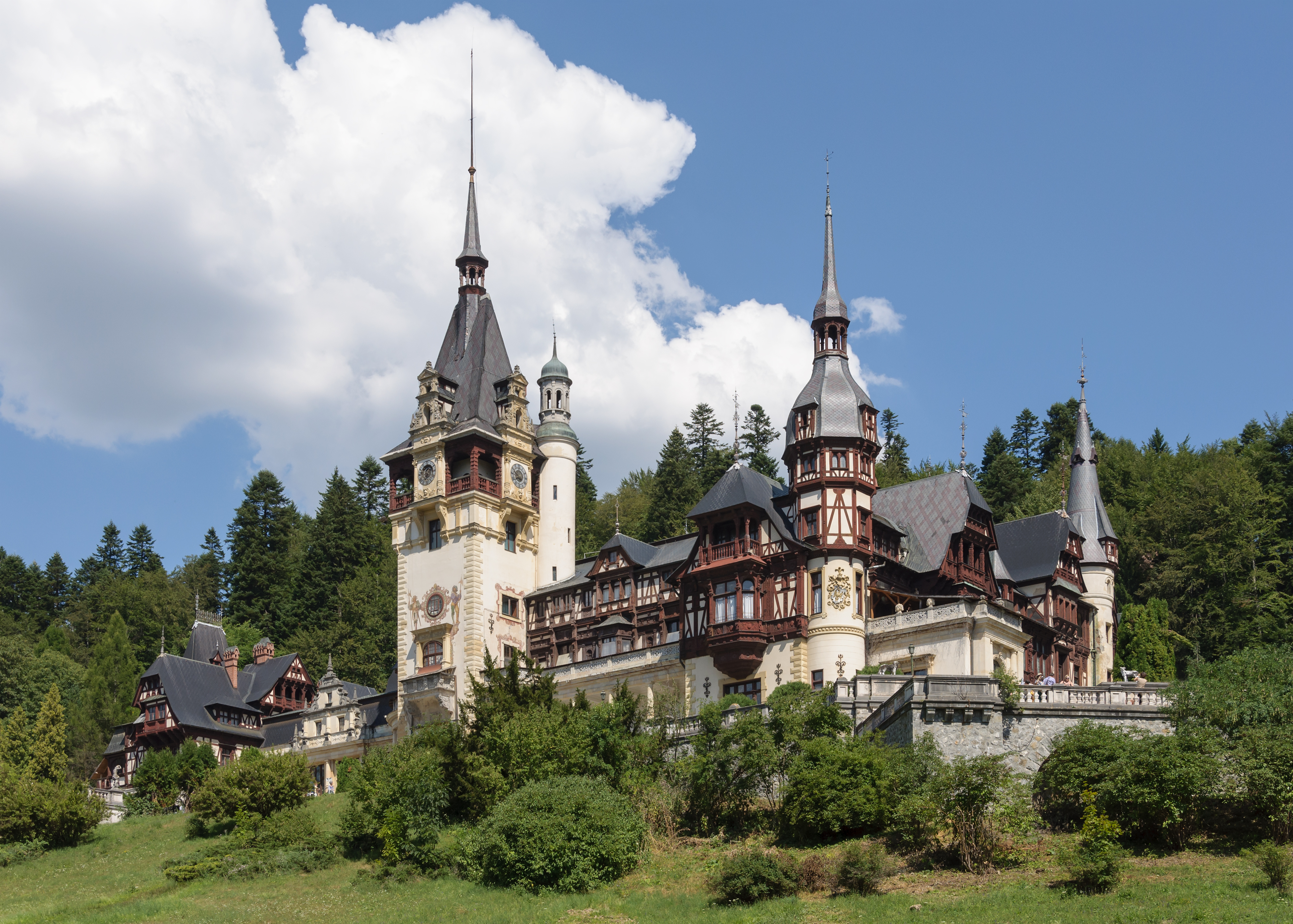
Peleș Castle, Sinaia

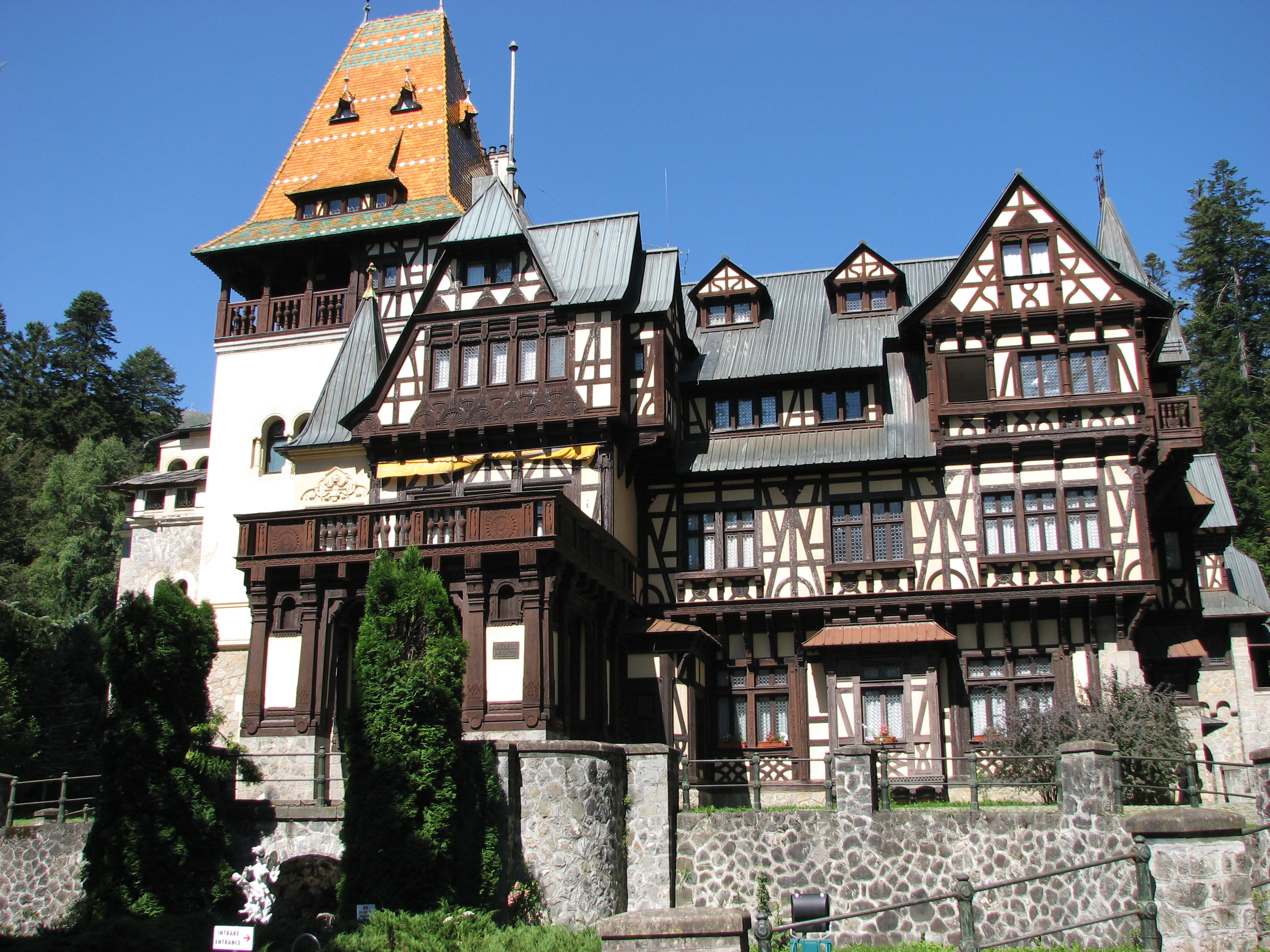
Pelișor Castle, Sinaia

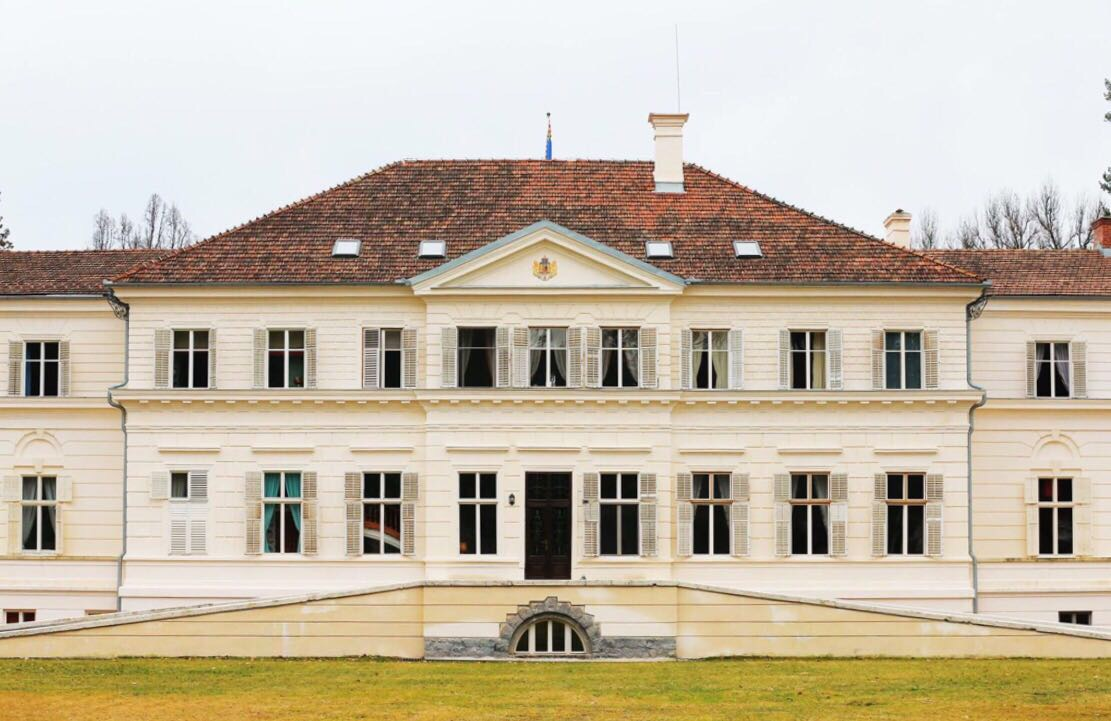
Săvârșin Castle, Arad County

== Later years ==
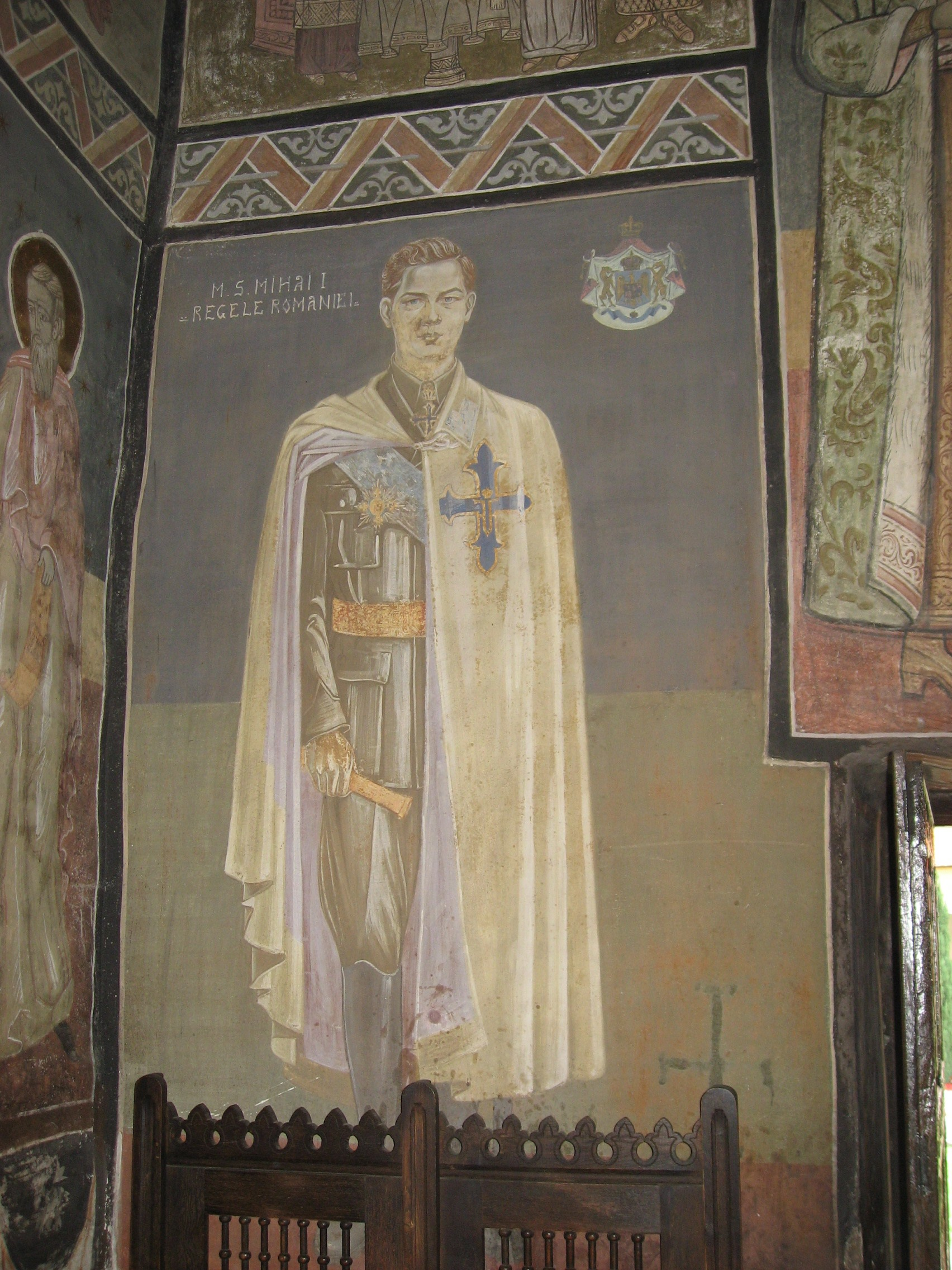
Fresco of King Michael I on the walls of Sâmbăta Monastery

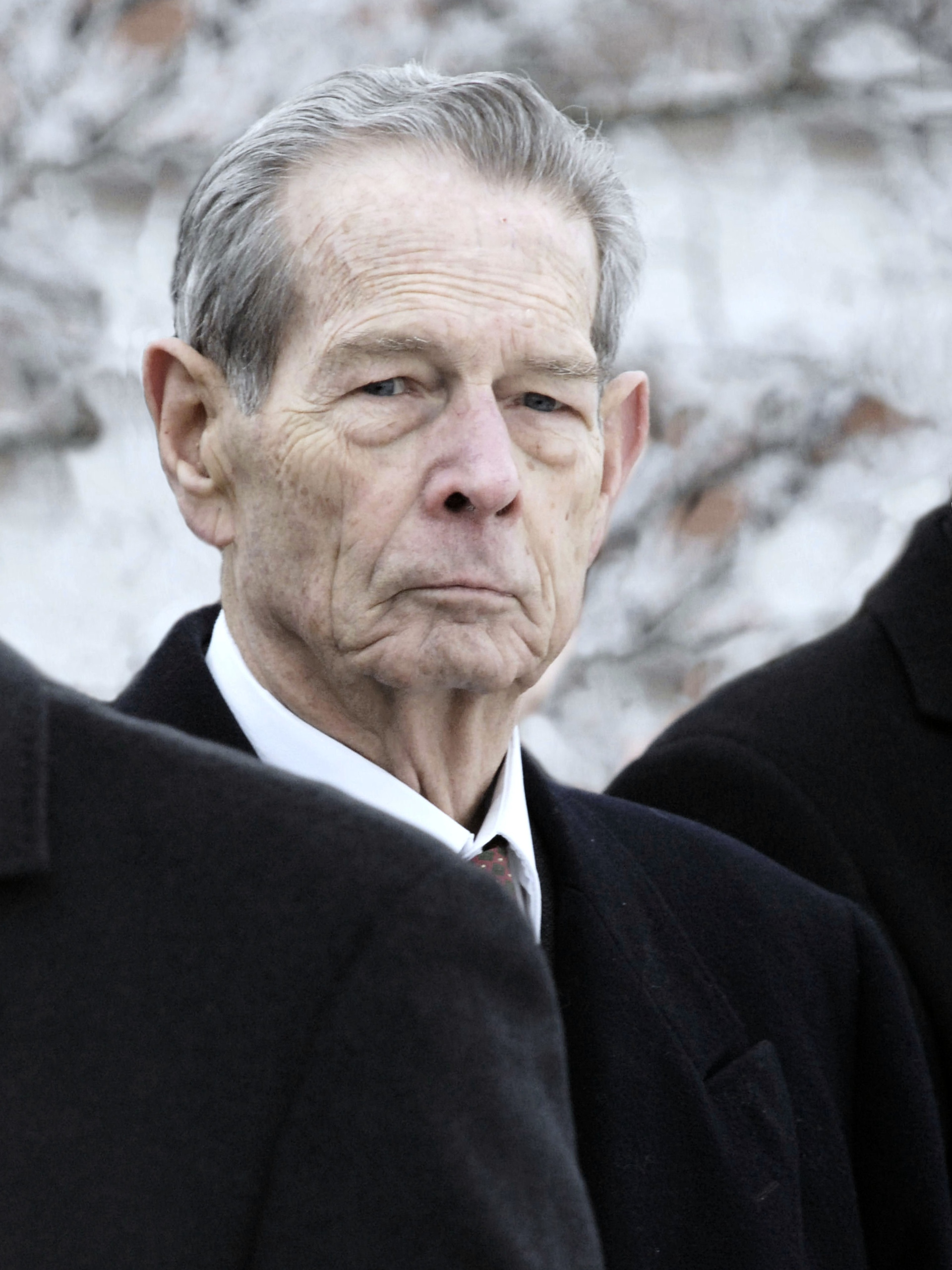
Michael I in Alba Iulia, 2007

Michael neither encouraged nor opposed monarchist agitation in Romania and royalist parties have made little impact in post-communist Romanian politics. He took the view that the restoration of the monarchy in Romania can only result from a decision by the Romanian people. "If the people want me to come back, of course, I will come back," he said in 1990. "Romanians have had enough suffering imposed on them to have the right to be consulted on their future." King Michael's belief was that there is still a role for, and value in, the monarchy today: "We are trying to make people understand what the Romanian monarchy was, and what it can still do [for them]."

According to a 2007 opinion poll conducted at the request of the Romanian royal family, only 14% of Romanians were in favour of the restoration of the monarchy. Another 2008 poll found that only 16% of Romanians are monarchists. Michael himself, however, was shown to be much more popular personally with the Romanian people: In a July 2013 survey, 45% of Romanians had a good or very good opinion of Michael, with 6.5% thinking the opposite. The royal family also enjoyed similar numbers, with 41% having a good or very good opinion of it, and just 6.5% having a poor or very poor one.

Michael undertook some quasi-diplomatic roles on behalf of post-communist Romania. In 1997 and 2002 he toured Western Europe, lobbying for Romania's admission into NATO and the European Union, and was received by heads of state and government officials.

In December 2003, to the "stupefaction of the public opinion in Romania", Michael awarded the "Man of The Year 2003" prize to Prime Minister Adrian Năstase, leader of the Social Democratic Party (PSD), on behalf of the tabloid VIP. The daily Evenimentul Zilei subsequently complained that 'such an activity was unsuited to a king and that Michael was wasting away his prestige', with the majority of the political analysts 'considering his gesture as a fresh abdication'.

On 10 May 2007, King Michael received the Prague Society for International Cooperation and Global Panel Foundation's 6th Annual Hanno R. Ellenbogen Citizenship Award, previously awarded to Vladimir Ashkenazy, Madeleine Albright, Václav Havel, Lord Robertson, and Miloš Forman. On 8 April 2008, King Michael and Patriarch Daniel were elected as honorary members of the Romanian Academy.

Michael participated in the Victory Parade in Moscow in 2010 as the only living Supreme Commander-in-Chief of a European State in the Second World War. The name of Michael I is listed on the memorial in the Grand Kremlin Palace as one of only 20 recipients of the Order of Victory.

In old age, Michael enjoyed a strong revival in popularity. On 25 October 2011, on the occasion of his 90th birthday, he delivered a speech before the assembled chambers of the Romanian Parliament. An opinion poll in January 2012 placed him as the most trusted public figure in Romania, far ahead of the political leaders. Later, in October 2012, celebrating Michael's 91st birthday, a square in Bucharest was renamed after him.

On 1 August 2016, he became a widower when Queen Anne died at the age of 92.

=== Health issues ===
On 2 March 2016, the Royal Council announced King Michael's retirement from public life; with tasks assumed by Crown Princess Margareta, his daughter. After surgery, Michael was diagnosed with chronic leukemia and metastatic epidermoid carcinoma and faced a complex and lengthy treatment.

In June 2017, the Royal House stated in a press release that "His Majesty's health is fragile but stable. King Michael is quiet, has soulful appreciation and appreciates the care of his medical team. Along with the King, they are permanently employed by His Majesty's House, detached in Switzerland, and two Orthodox nuns."

At the end of August 2017, the Royal House announced that King Michael was "in a fragile but balanced state, and has a good mood," stating that Princess Elena had completed a visit to Switzerland for a few days to see her father, at the private residence. According to the Royal House, Michael remained "daily under close supervision of physicians, medical staff of various specialties, and in the presence of devoted members of the staff of His Majesty's House, stationed in Switzerland." Two Orthodox nuns, detached from the Romanian Orthodox Church, remained at the private residence.

== Death and state funeral ==
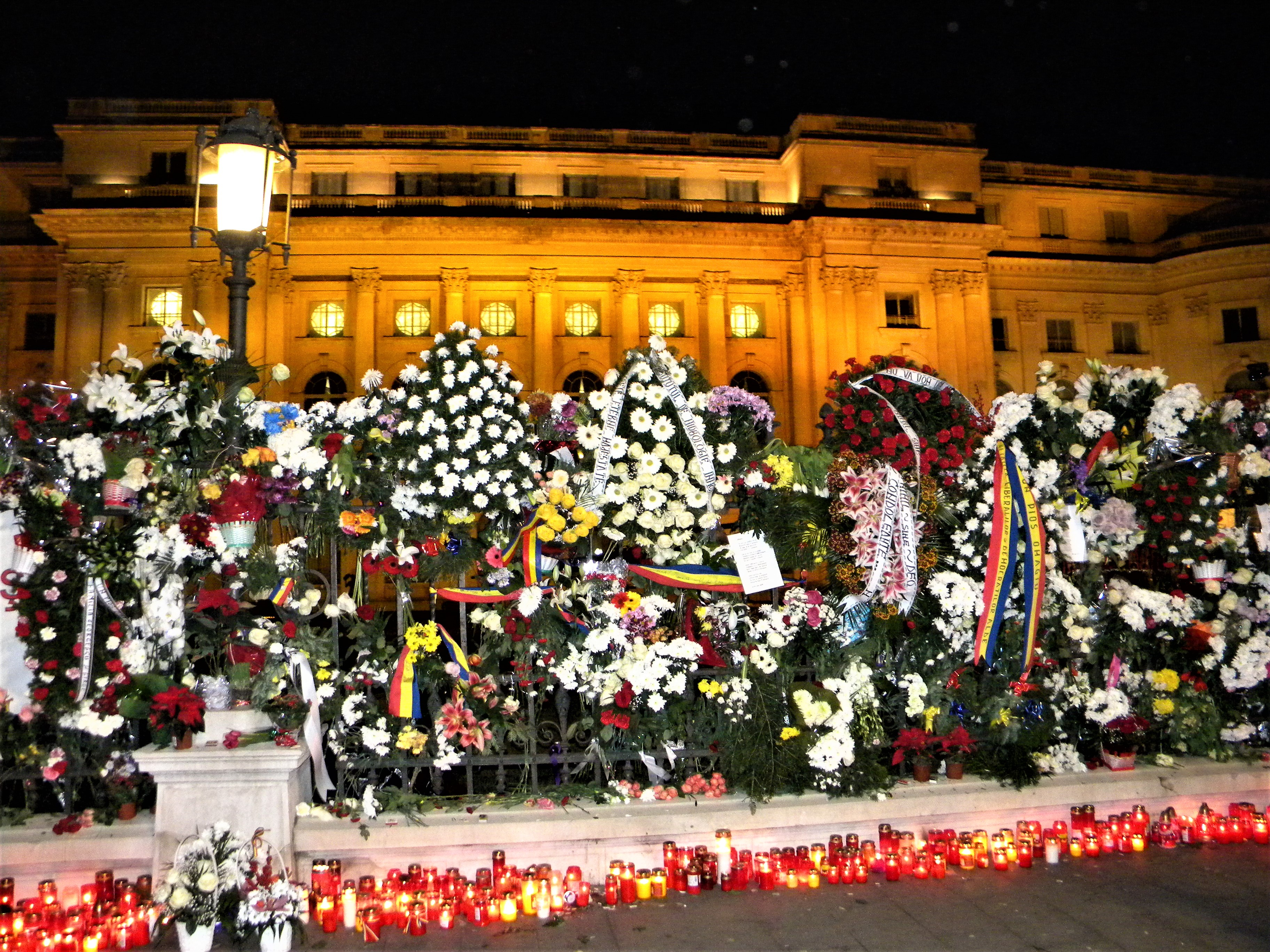
Tributes to King Michael in Bucharest, December 2017

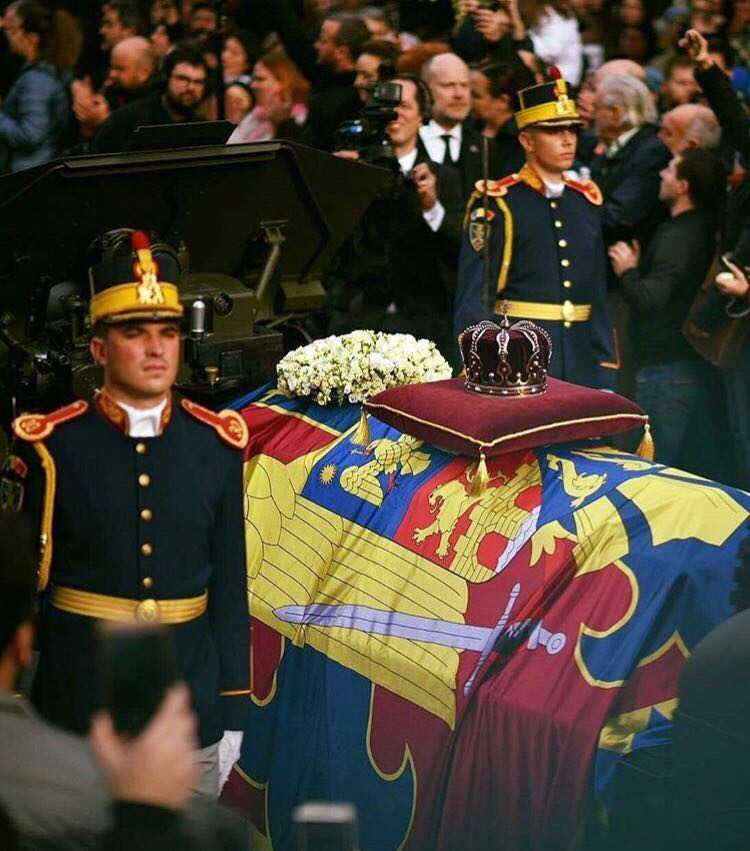
King Michael I's coffin during the funeral procession on Victory Avenue towards the Union Square and the Romanian Patriarchal Cathedral

On 5 December 2017, Michael died at his residence in Switzerland at the age of 96, in the presence of his youngest daughter Princess Maria. His coffin, draped by his Royal Standard, was brought back to Romania on 13 December, arriving at the Otopeni Airport in Bucharest from Lausanne, via Payerne Air Base, escorted by his second daughter, Elena with her husband Alexander Nixon, fourth daughter Sofia and also members of the Royal Household. They were transported by the Romanian Air Force's Alenia C-27J Spartan transport aircraft, which was flanked by four Mikoyan-Gurevich MiG-21 jet fighters.

The coffin was first taken to Peleș Castle at Sinaia in the Carpathian Mountains. Then, it was brought to Bucharest, where it was laid and displayed at the Royal Palace for two days. King Michael I was buried on 16 December with full state honours in the Mausoleum of the Royal Family, on the grounds of the Curtea de Argeș Cathedral together with his wife Queen Anne who died in 2016. His body was transferred from Bucharest to Curtea de Argeș with the help of a funeral train, the Royal Train, and a repainted domestic-traffic carriage, being led by a diesel locomotive. His funeral is stated to have been one of the largest in Romania, with almost a million Romanians flocking to the capital to pay their respects and watch the funeral, with it being comparable to the one of Corneliu Coposu in 1995.

== Line of succession ==
According to the succession provisions of the Romanian kingdom's last democratically approved monarchical constitution of 1923, upon the death of King Michael without sons, the claim to the Crown devolves once again upon the Hohenzollern family. However, on 30 December 2007, on the 60th anniversary of his abdication, King Michael signed the Fundamental Rules of the Royal Family of Romania, by which he designated Princess Margareta as his heir. The document has no legal standing, as it regulates an institution that is no longer extant.

On 10 May 2011, on a background of lawsuits in Germany brought against his family by Michael's German relatives regarding the former name Hohenzollern-Veringen of his son-in-law, Radu, and of fears expressed by some that the German Hohenzollerns may claim succession to the headship of the Romanian royal house, Michael severed all of the dynastic and historical ties with the princely house of Hohenzollern, changed the name of his family to "of Romania", and gave up all princely titles conferred upon him and his family by the German Hohenzollerns.

On 1 August 2015, Michael signed a document removing the title Prince of Romania and the qualification of Royal Highness from his grandson, Nicholas Medforth-Mills, who was also removed from the line of succession. The former king took the decision "with an eye on Romania's future after the reign and life of his eldest daughter, Margareta". The former king hoped that "Nicholas will find in future years a suitable way to serve the ideals and use the qualities that God gave him". Nicholas's mother, Princess Elena, received notification of the former king's decision in a personal letter.

== Personality and personal interests ==
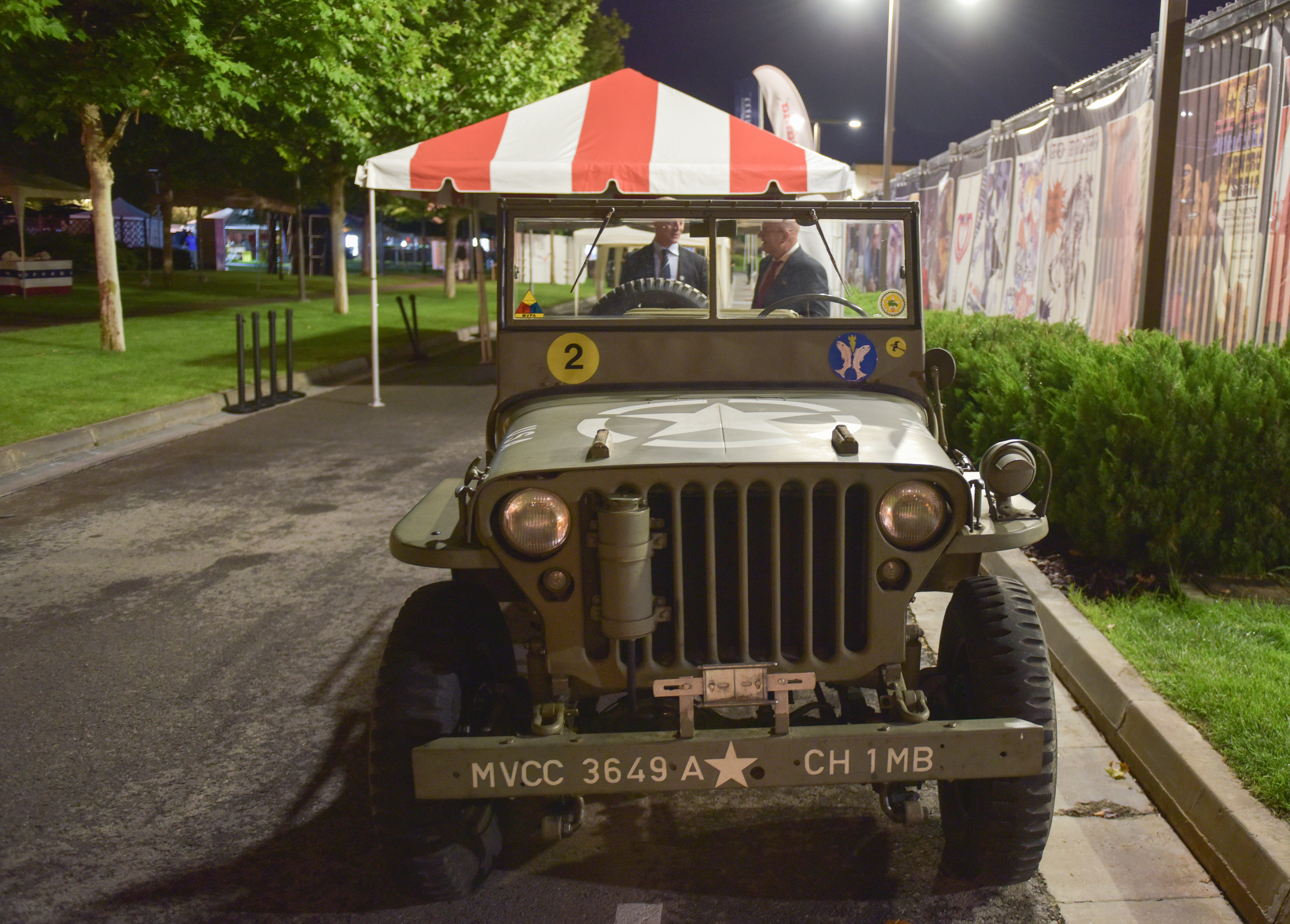
A 1944 Willys Jeep from Michael's collection that belonged to General George S. Patton

Aged 16, when Michael was crown prince, he hit a bicyclist while driving a car, causing the cyclist's death. The incident was censored in contemporary press, but appears in the official Censorship Records, and is confirmed by the memoirs of the former prime minister Constantin Argetoianu.

Michael was head of the Romanian Boy Scouts in the 1930s. He was passionate about cars, especially military jeeps. He was also interested in aircraft, having worked as a test pilot during exile.

Shortly after the Second World War, Michael became interested in Moral Rearmament, which was introduced to him by his first cousin Prince Richard of Hesse-Cassel, and as Swiss residents after 1956 he and Queen Anne paid numerous visits to the MRA conference centre of Caux, where he found solace for the loss of his country and his émigré status as well as new hope for future reconciliation.

== Honours, awards and arms ==
| Arms of dominion of Michael I as King | Standard of Michael I as King |

=== Honours ===
- Belgium: Knight Grand Cross of the Order of Leopold I
- Independent State of Croatia: Grand Order with Sash and Danica star of the Order of the Crown of King Zvonimir (10th April 1942)
- Czechoslovakia: Grand Cross with Collar of the Order of the White Lion
- Czech Republic: Recipient of the Medal of Merit of the Ministry of Defence, Special Class
- Denmark: Recipient of the Royal Medal of Recompense, Special Class
- Finland: Grand Cross with Collar of the Order of the White Rose
- France
  - France: Grand Cross of the Order of the Legion of Honour
  - (Kingdom of France) House of Orléans: Knight Grand Cross with Collar of the Order of Saint Lazarus
- (Greece) Greek Royal Family: Knight Grand Cross of the Royal Order of the Redeemer
- (Greece) Greek Royal Family: Knight Grand Cross with Collar of the Royal Order of Saints George and Constantine
- (Greece) Greek Royal Family: Knight Grand Cross of the Royal Order of George I
- (Kingdom of Greece) Greek Royal Family: Knight of the Royal Decoration of the Greek Royal House, Special Class
- Greek Royal Family: Recipient of the Centenary Medal of the Kingdom of Greece
- (Kingdom of Italy) Italian Royal Family: Knight of the Royal Order of the Most Holy Annunciation
- (Kingdom of Italy) Italian Royal Family: Knight Grand Cross of the Royal Order of Saints Maurice and Lazarus
- (Kingdom of Italy) Italian Royal Family: Knight Grand Cross the Royal Order of the Crown
  - Sovereign Military Order of Malta: Bailiff Knight Grand Cross of Honour and Devotion of the Order of Saint John
- Empire of Manchukuo: Knight Grand Cordon with Collar of the Order of the Orchid Blossom
- Poland: Grand Cross of the Order of the White Eagle
- Russia
  - Soviet Union: Member of the Order of Victory
  - Russia: Recipient of the 60 Years of Victory in the Great Patriotic War of 1941–1945 Commemorative Jubilee Medal
- Serbia
  - (Kingdom of Yugoslavia) Serbian Royal Family: Knight Grand Cross of the Royal Order of the Star of Karađorđe
  - (Kingdom of Yugoslavia) Serbian Royal Family: Knight Grand Cross of the Royal Order of Saint Sava
  - Republic of Serbia: Recipient of the Military Virtue Medal
- Sweden: Recipient of the 50th Birthday Medal of King Carl XVI Gustaf
- United Kingdom: Honorary Knight Grand Cross of the Royal Victorian Order
- United Kingdom: Recipient of the King George VI Coronation Medal
- United States: Chief Commander of the Legion of Merit

=== Awards ===
==== National awards ====
- Romania: Honorary Citizen of Călărași County
- Romania: Honorary Citizen of the City of Techirghiol (in Constanța county)
- Romania: Honorary Citizen of the City of Craiova
- Romania: Honorary Citizen of the Village of Stremț (in Alba county)
- Romania: Honorary Degree from the Bucharest University of Economic Studies
- Romania: Honorary Degree from the University of Agronomic Sciences and Veterinary Medicine (in Bucharest)
- Romania: Honorary Degree from the Dimitrie Cantemir Christian University (in Bucharest)
- Romania: Honorary Degree from the Politehnica University of Bucharest
- Romania: Honorary Degree from the University of Pitești
- Romania: Honorary Degree from the University of Bucharest
- Romania: Honorary Degree from the Victor Babeș University of Medicine and Pharmacy, Timișoara
- Romania: Honorary Degree from the Polytechnic University of Timișoara
- Romania: Honorary Degree from the University of Agricultural Sciences and Veterinary Medicine of Cluj-Napoca
- Romania: Honorary Degree from the Carol I National Defence University (in Bucharest)
- Romania: Honorary Degree from the Alexandru Ioan Cuza University (in Iași)
- (Romania) Romanian Jewish community: Recipient of the Alexandru Șafran Medal

==== Foreign awards ====
- Czech Republic: Honorary Citizen of the City of Kroměříž
  - Prague:
    - Prague Society for International Cooperation: Sixth Recipient of the Hanno R. Ellenbogen Citizenship Award
- United Kingdom: Freeman of the City of London
- United Kingdom: Liveryman of the Worshipful Company of Wax Chandlers

== Military ranks ==
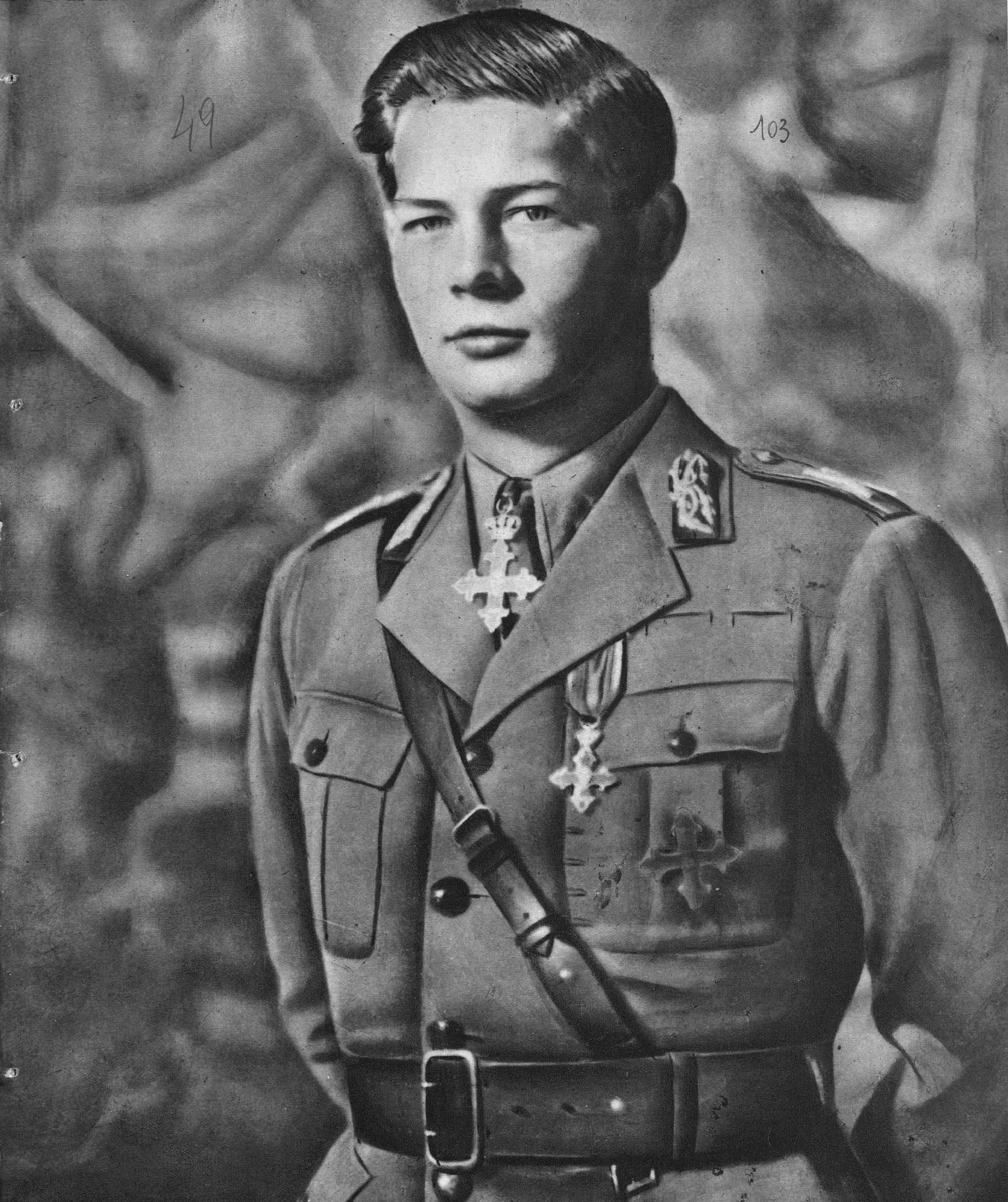
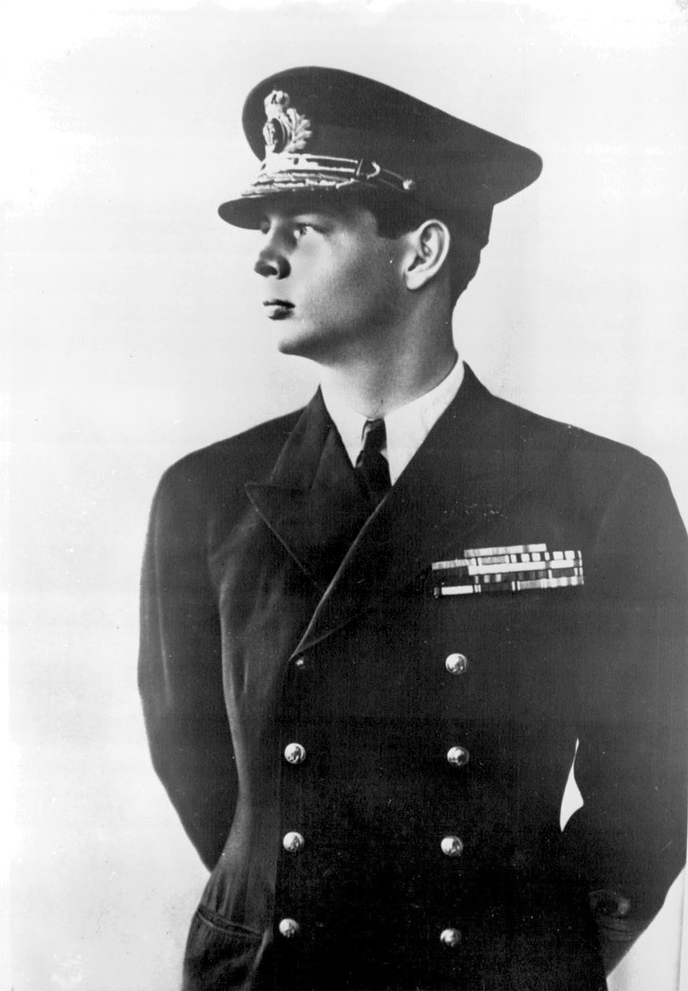
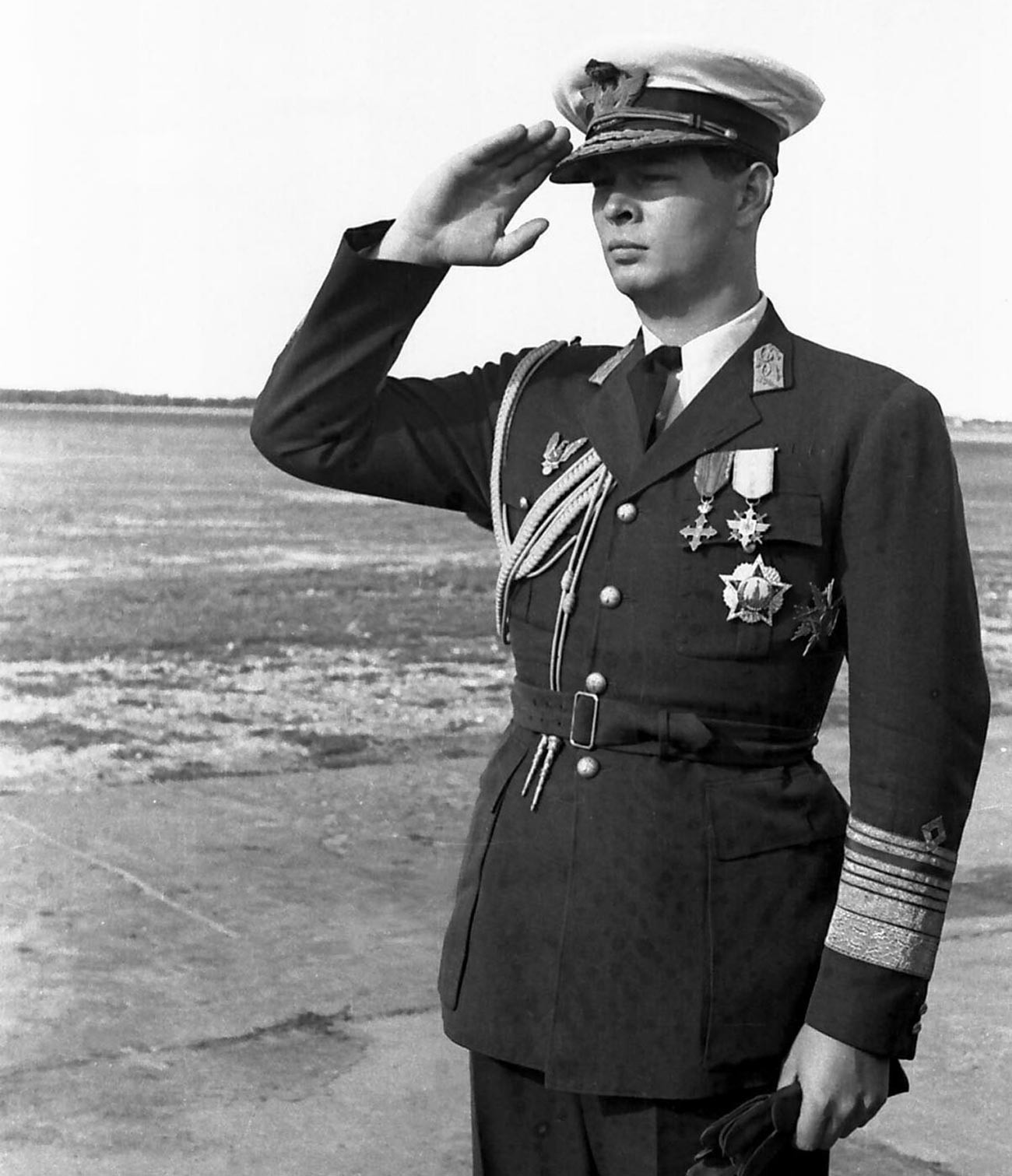
Michael in the Romanian Army (left), Navy (center), and Air Force (right) Marshal uniforms

Kingdom of Romania

- Marshal of the Romanian Armed Forces
  - Supreme Commander–in–Chief General of the Romanian Land Forces
  - Supreme Commander–in–Chief Marshal of the Romanian Air Force
  - Supreme Commander–in–Chief Admiral of the Romanian Naval Forces

Kingdom of Greece

- Honorary Air Chief Marshal of the Hellenic Air Force

== Honorific eponyms ==
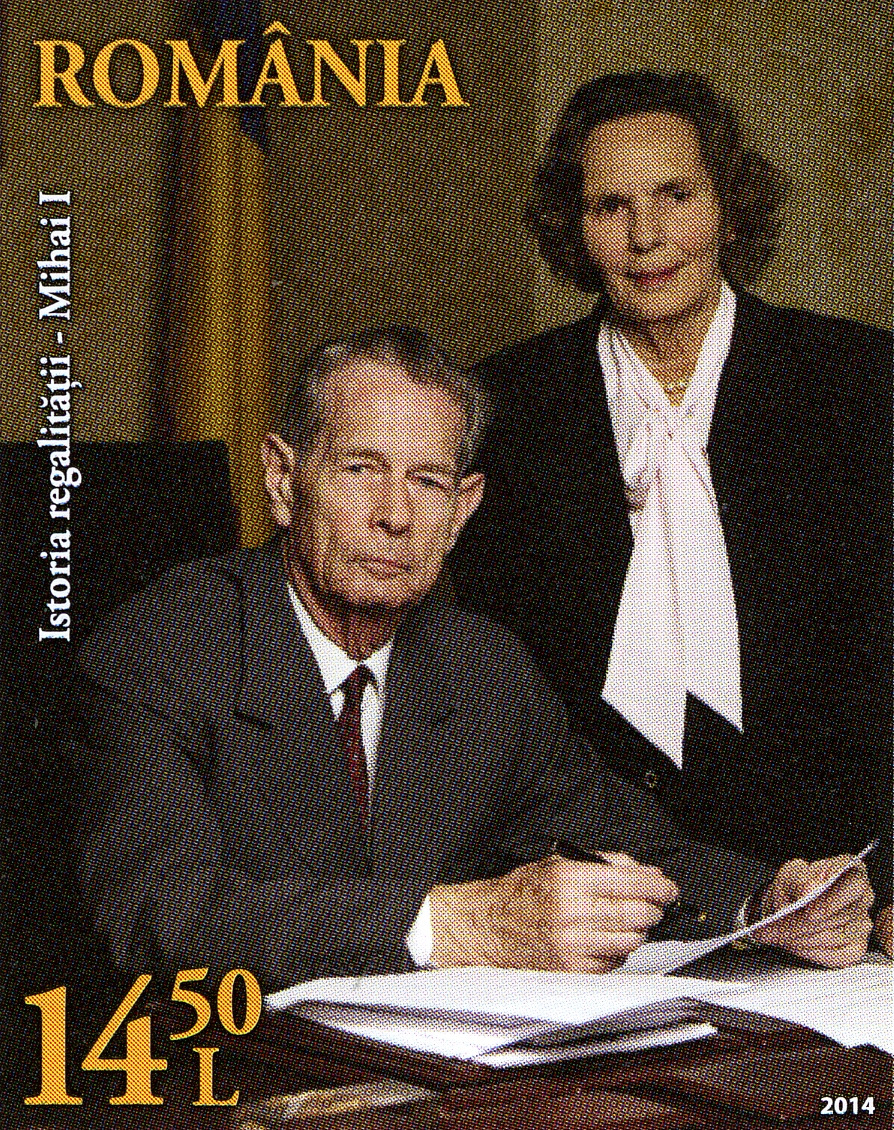
Michael I and Anne on a 2014 Romanian stamp

- Romania
  - House of Romania: King Michael I Medal for Loyalty
  - Bucharest:
    - King Michael I Park
    - King Michael I Boulevard
    - King Michael I Square
    - King Michael I High School
    - King Michael I Railway Technical College
  - Banat: King Michael I Banat University of Agricultural Sciences and Veterinary Medicine
  - Curtea de Argeș: King Michael I Technological High School
  - Drobeta-Turnu Severin: King Michael I High School
  - Pucioasa: King Michael I Technical High School
  - Săvârșin: King Michael I Technological High School
- Moldova
  - Cimișeni: King Michael I High School

=== Statues and monuments ===
On 25 October 2012, a large monument to Michael including a large bronze bust was unveiled at King Michael I Square in Bucharest. Michael attended and unveiled the statue.

On 25 October 2021, a statue of Michael was unveiled in the town of Sinaia, on the occasion of the centenary of his birth. Minister of Culture Bogdan Gheorghiu was in attendance, along with Margareta of Romania, other government representatives, and members of parliament. Representatives of the Army also attended.

Michael I of Romania House of Romania Born: 25 October 1921
Regnal titles
| Preceded by Ferdinand I | King of Romania; 20 July 1927 – 8 June 1930 | Succeeded by Carol II |
| Preceded by Carol II | King of Romania; 6 September 1940 – 30 December 1947 | Monarchy abolished Constantin Ion Parhon as head of state of Romania |
Titles in pretence
| Monarchy abolished | — TITULAR — Head of the Romanian royal family 30 December 1947 – 5 December 2017; Reason for succession failure: Kingdom abolished in 1947 | Succeeded by Disputed; Margareta or Paul or Karl |
