= Princess Tania de Bourbon Parme =

French designer

Princess Tania
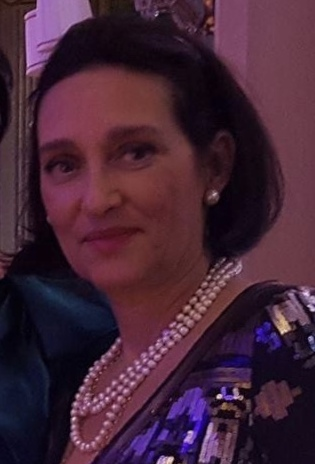
- Princess Tania in 2017
- Born: 13 November 1961 (age 64); Paris, France
- Spouse: Gilbert Jacques Marcel Bécaud (m. 1988; div. 2007) Louis-Arnaud L'Herbier (m. 2007)
- Issue: Marguerite Bécaud; Héléna Bécaud; Dagmar Bécaud
Names
- Sophie Tania de Bourbon-Parme
- House: Bourbon-Parma
- Father: Prince André of Bourbon-Parma
- Mother: Marina Gacry
- Occupation: Designer; businesswoman

Princess Sophie Tania of Bourbon-Parma (born 13 November 1961) is a French designer, businesswoman, and member of the House of Bourbon-Parma. She designs luxury goods, jewelry, and tableware. She has worked as a partner with the French luxury company S. T. Dupont and served as an advisor to Stephen Hung for his luxury casino-resort in Macau, 'The 13'. One of her designs, the Louis XIII Fleur de Parme, was recorded in the Guinness Book of World Records as the world's most expensive lighter. Princess Tania is the founder and chairwoman of L'Art Autrement Dit, an organization that promotes French art to international buyers.

== Early life and family ==
Tania was born on 13 November 1961 in Paris to Prince André of Bourbon-Parma and Marina Gacry. Her father, the son of Prince René of Bourbon-Parma and Princess Margaret of Denmark, was a younger brother of Queen Anne of Romania. A member of the House of Bourbon-Parma, she is a distant relative of the Spanish royal family and a descendant of the Capetian dynasty. She is a great-granddaughter of Robert I, Duke of Parma and a grandniece of Zita of Bourbon-Parma, the last Austrian empress.

When she was a child, her parents moved into her grandmother's house. Her grandmother, Princess Margaret, was a granddaughter of Christian IX of Denmark. Her grandmother taught her etiquette, royal protocol, and family history, particularly the family connections to the House of Bourbon.

She studied graphic design, art, and interior decorating at the Penninghen School of Arts in Paris.

== Career ==
Princess Tania works as a jewelry, tableware, and fashion accessories designer.

Stephen Hung appointed Princess Tania as a special adviser for his hotel project in Macau. The real estate project was created through Louis XIII Holdings, later renamed The 13 Holdings Limited.

Since 2008 she has served as the chairwoman of L'Art Autrement Dit, an organization she founded that promotes French art to foreign buyers. She has partnered with S. T. Dupont, a French luxury brands company, to create luxury accessories. One of her designs from this partnership was the world's most expensive lighter, the Louis XIII Fleur de Parme, which was recorded in the Guinness Book of World Records.

In May 2010 she hired the law firm Jones Day to provide legal assistance in a pre-litigation matter concerning another member of her family using a similar trademark and the family name for their business.

== Personal life ==
Princess Tania married Gilbert "Gaya" Jacques Marcel Bécaud, the son of Gilbert Bécaud, in 1988. They had a civil ceremony on 8 July in La Bussière, Vienne and a Catholic ceremony on 9 August in Le Buisson, Lozère. They have three children, Marguerite, Héléna (or Hélèna), and Dagmar. The couple divorced in 2007. Later that year she married, a second time, to Louis-Arnaud L'Herbier, an event producer.

On 2 June 2017 Princess Tania attended a charity ball to raise money for children with visual impairments. In 2019 she attended the Rallye des Grâces, a women's empowerment event in Beirut.
