= Mira Adanja Polak =

Serbian journalist

- Мира Адања Полак
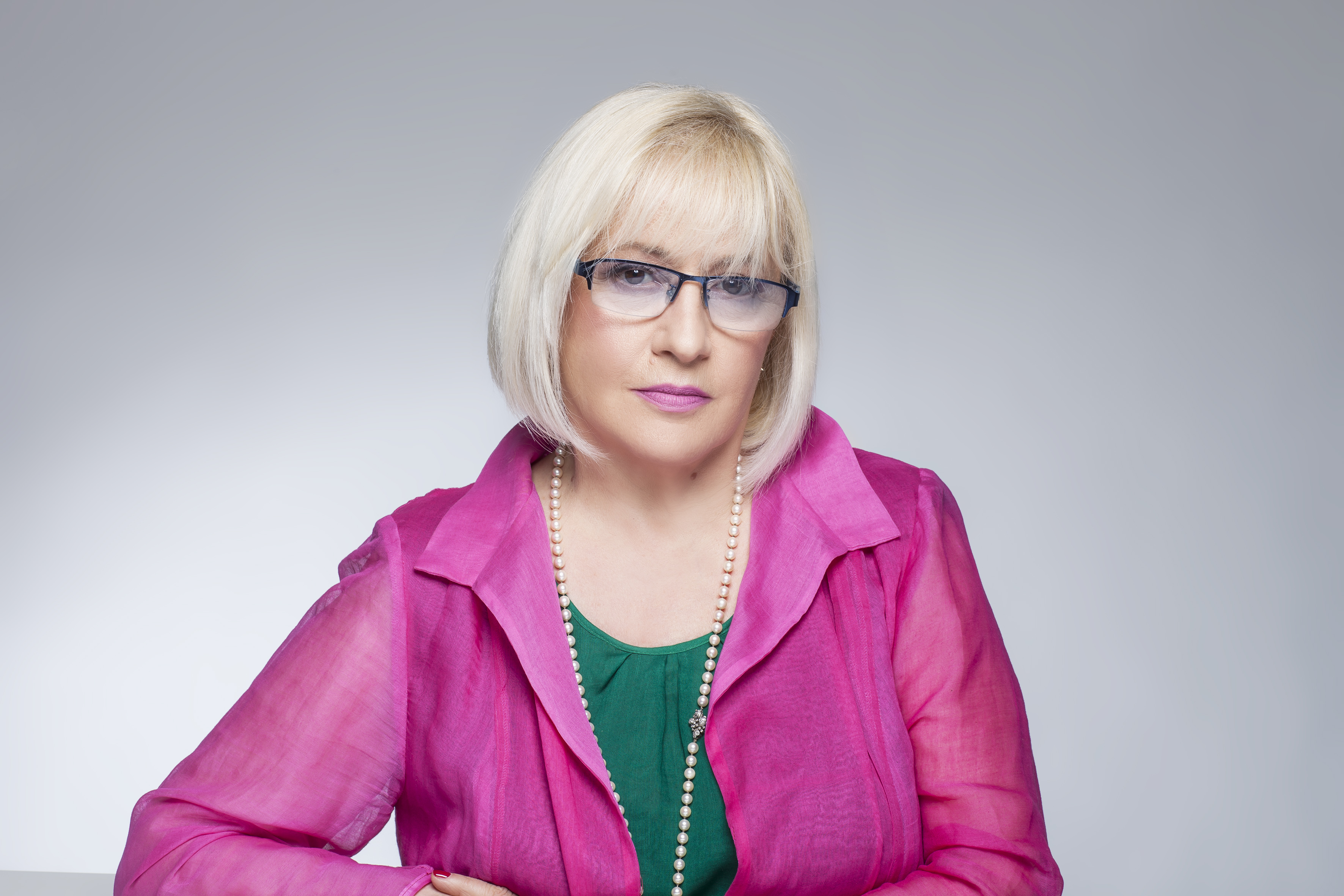
- Adanja Polak in 2016
- Born: Mira Adanja; 22 August 1942 (age 84); Budapest, Kingdom of Hungary
- Education: Faculty of Philosophy, University of Belgrade
- Occupations: Producer, journalist, presenter, researcher and author
- Employer(s): Radio Television of Serbia; ITN; People Magazine; NBC; Royalty Magazine
- Known for: Mira Adanja-Polak – Exclusive and Mira Adanja-Polak and You shows
- Spouse: Martin Darko Polak
- Parents: Solomon Adanja (father); Katarina Adanja (mother)

Mira Adanja Polak (Serbian Cyrillic: Мира Адања Полак; born 22 August 1942) is a Serbian journalist, producer, researcher, author and TV host.

Her TV show Mira Adanja-Polak – Exclusive is broadcast weekly on Radio Television Serbia.

She has a large number of exclusive interviews with famous artists, politicians, businessmen, celebrities and royal family members.

Interviews include: Henry Kissinger, David Rockefeller, Lord Carrington, Lord David Owen, Robert MacNamara, Willy Brandt, Armand Hammer, Lawrence Eagleburger, Valery Giscard D'Estaing, Graham Greene, Fredrick Forsyth, Peter Ustinov, Igor Ustinov, Art Buchwald, Mstislav Rostropovic, Carlo Ponti, Sophia Loren, Shimon Peres, long lasting president of Israel, Heinz Fischer, president of Austria, Princess Elizabeth of Yugoslavia, Elie Wiesel, Oriana Falacci, Indira Gandhi, Barbara Walters, Dan Rather, David Bailey, Kirk Douglas, Jovanka Broz, Erica Jong, Princess Leonide Romanoff, Prince Michael Feodorovich Romanoff, Bojko Borisov, prime minister of Bulgaria, Borut Pahor, president of Slovenia, Ivo Pogorelic, pianist, Hugo Vickers, biographer of the British royal family, Lord Aitken.

== Investigative documentaries ==
Mira Adanja-Polak is the author of over 400 investigative documentaries:

- Risk of Love (New York) – introducing the problem of AIDS in Eastern Europe
- Hospis – the art of dying
- File on Russian Tsar
- Russian Cemetery in the West (Paris)
- Meeting the Son of Hitler's Assassin (Graf von Staufenberg) (Munich)
- Life of Aircraft Carrier Nimitz
- Royal Divorce (London)
- Christie's – New York
- Visit to a Women's Jail – Killing the Husband (Belgrade)
- Road of a Drug (Amsterdam)
- Widow of Communism (Tito's wife Jovanka Broz after 16 years of silence) (Belgrade)
- Hand of St. John the Baptist (Montenegro)
- Woman Without Breasts (Belgrade)
- Adopting a Handicapped Child
- Berlin Wall (Before and After)
- Behind Closed Doors (West on Balkans)
- Love Letters From Mileva to Albert Einstein
- The Balkans and Yugoslavia 1941–45
- Television series on AIDS

== Working assignments ==
Foreign desk consultant for ITN in London – working on the Channel Four News programme. During the Bosnian Conflict she secured interviews for the programme with the Serbian President, Slobodan Miloševic, and the leaders of the Bosnian Serbs – Radovan Karadžic and General Ratko Mladic. These interviews were included in special reports on the crisis in Srebrenica. They achieved International Broadcasting Awards for Channel Four News – ITN.

Field Producer for People Magazine (New York) on the first visit of the Royal family to Belgrade after 60 years of exile, presenting the newly elected President Vojislav Koštunica to the Western world in a special profile, NBC TV's Nightline programme – covering the visit of Princess Elizabeth of Yugoslavia to her native country.

Contributor for The Dictionary of Art (London) – supplying various articles and photographs on Eastern European Art.

Exclusive Reports for Royalty Magazine (London).

Consultant to ABC Television – Pierre Salinger's Broadcasts – during the 1984 Winter Olympics in Sarajevo.

== Publications ==
- Amerikanci (The Americans) – the result of research into American Society.

== Publication entries about Mira Adanja-Polak ==
- International Who's Who 2013, Routledge, Taylor and Francis Group
- The International Who's Who of Women 2002
- International Headers in Achievement 1991
- International Who's Who of Intellectuals 1992
- British National Union of Journalists Freelance Directory
- Who's Who (Yugoslavia)
