= List of Romanian royal consorts =

Consorts of Romanian monarchs were persons married to the Romanian monarch during his reign. All monarchs of modern Romania were male with the title of King of the Romanians, but all Romanian consorts were women with the title of Queen of Romania and style Majesty, rather than Queen of the Romanians. The following women were Queens of Romania as spouses of the kings of modern Romania between 1859 and 1927, while Helen of Greece and Denmark was Queen Mother between 1940 and 1947.

== Princesses of the United Principalities ==
=== House of Cuza ===
Picture	Name	Father	Birth	Marriage	Became princess	Ceased to be princess	Death	Spouse
	Elena Rosetti	Postelnic Iordache Rosetti (Rosetti)	17 June 1825	1844	24 January 1859; Union of Moldavia and Wallachia	11 February 1866 husband's abdication	2 April 1909	Alexandru Ioan Cuza

=== House of Hohenzollern-Sigmaringen ===
Picture	Name	Father	Birth	Marriage	Became princess	Ceased to be princess	Death	Spouse
	Pauline Elisabeth Ottilie Luise of Wied	Hermann, Prince of Wied (Wied)	29 December 1843	15 November 1869		1 March 1881 husband's change of title	2 March 1916	Carol I

== Queens of Romania ==
=== House of Hohenzollern-Sigmaringen ===
Picture	Name	Father	Birth	Marriage	Became queen	Ceased to be queen	Death	Spouse
	Pauline Elisabeth Ottilie Luise of Wied	Hermann, Prince of Wied (Wied)	29 December 1843	15 November 1869	1 March 1881; Kingdom created	10 October 1914 husband's death	2 March 1916	Carol I
	Marie Alexandra Victoria of Edinburgh	Prince Alfred, Duke of Edinburgh (Saxe-Coburg and Gotha)	29 October 1875	10 January 1893	10 October 1914 husband's accession	20 July 1927 husband's death	18 July 1938	Ferdinand I
	Helen of Greece and Denmark	Constantine I of Greece (Gluecksburg)	2 May 1896	10 March 1921	Queen Mother: 6 September 1940 son's accession	30 December 1947 son's abdication	28 November 1982	Carol II

== Consorts of the House of Romania ==
=== House of Romania ===
Picture	Name	Father	Birth	Marriage	Became consort	Ceased to be consort	Death	Spouse
	Anne Antoinette Françoise Charlotte Zita Marguerite of Bourbon-Parma	Prince René of Bourbon-Parma (Bourbon-Parma)	18 September 1923	10 June 1948		1 August 2016		Michael I
	Radu Duda	René Corneliu Duda	7 June 1960	24 July 1994	5 December 2017 wife’s accession	Incumbent		Margareta I

== See also ==
- List of consorts of Transylvania
