= Princess Margaret of Denmark =

Princess René of Bourbon-Parma (1895–1992)

Princess Margaret
- Princess René of Bourbon-Parma
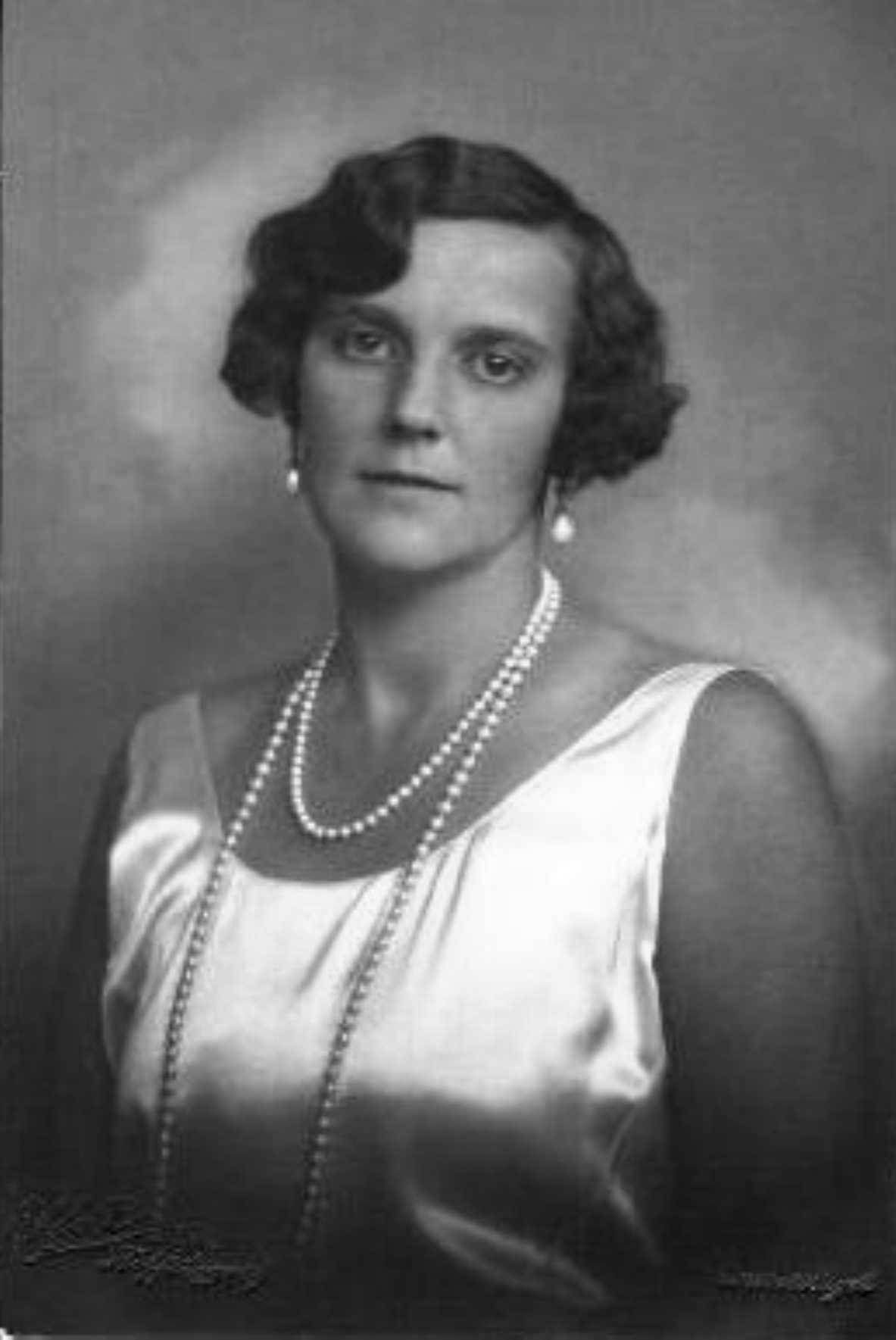
- Margaret in 1921
- Born: 17 September 1895; Bernstorff Palace, Gentofte, Denmark
- Died: 18 September 1992 (aged 97); Copenhagen, Denmark
- Burial: Roskilde Cathedral
- Spouse: Prince René of Bourbon-Parma (m. 1921; died 1962)
- Issue Detail: Prince Jacques; Anne, Queen of Romania; Prince Michel; Prince André
Names
- Margrethe Françoise Louise Marie Helene
- House: Glücksburg
- Father: Prince Valdemar of Denmark
- Mother: Princess Marie of Orléans

Princess Margaret of Denmark (Margrethe Françoise Louise Marie Helene; 17 September 1895 – 18 September 1992) was a Danish princess by birth and a princess of Bourbon-Parma as the wife of Prince René of Bourbon-Parma. She was the youngest grandchild of King Christian IX of Denmark.

== Biography ==
=== Family and background ===
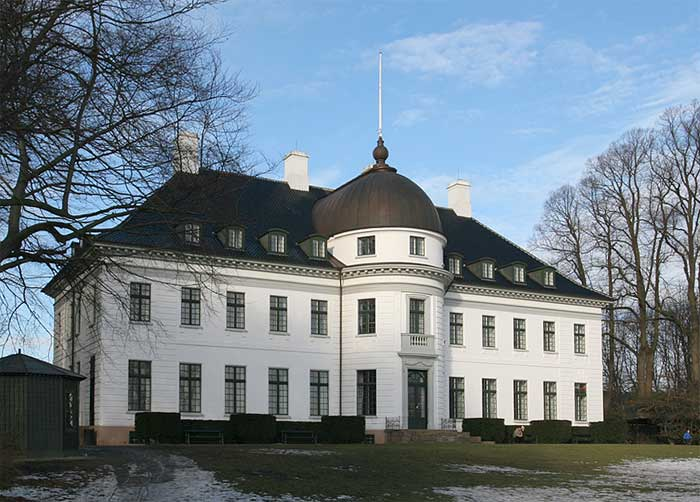
Bernstorff Palace: Princess Margaret's birthplace

Princess Margaret was born on 17 September 1895, in Bernstorff Palace north of Copenhagen. She was the fifth child and only daughter of Prince Valdemar of Denmark, and his wife Princess Marie of Orléans. Margaret's connections to European royalty were extensive. Her father, Prince Valdemar, was one of the six children of King Christian IX of Denmark. Valdemar had two older brothers and three sisters – King Frederick VIII of Denmark, King George I of Greece, Queen Alexandra of the United Kingdom, Empress Maria Feodorovna of Russia and Thyra, the titular queen of Hanover.

Margaret's mother was the eldest daughter of Prince Robert, Duke of Chartres and Princess Françoise of Orléans. Her parents' marriage had been arranged by their families, as was the custom among European royalty in that era. It had been agreed at the time of her parents' wedding that all their sons would be raised Lutheran, their father's religion, and all their daughters Roman Catholic, their mother's religion. Margaret, the only daughter, thus became the first Danish princess since the Reformation to be raised a Roman Catholic.

Princess Margrethe grew up with her brothers between her parents' residence in Copenhagen, the Yellow Palace next to the Amalienborg Palace complex in central Copenhagen, and their country residence, Bernstorff Palace, in Gentofte, north of the city. She was only fourteen years old when her mother died in 1909.

=== Marriage ===
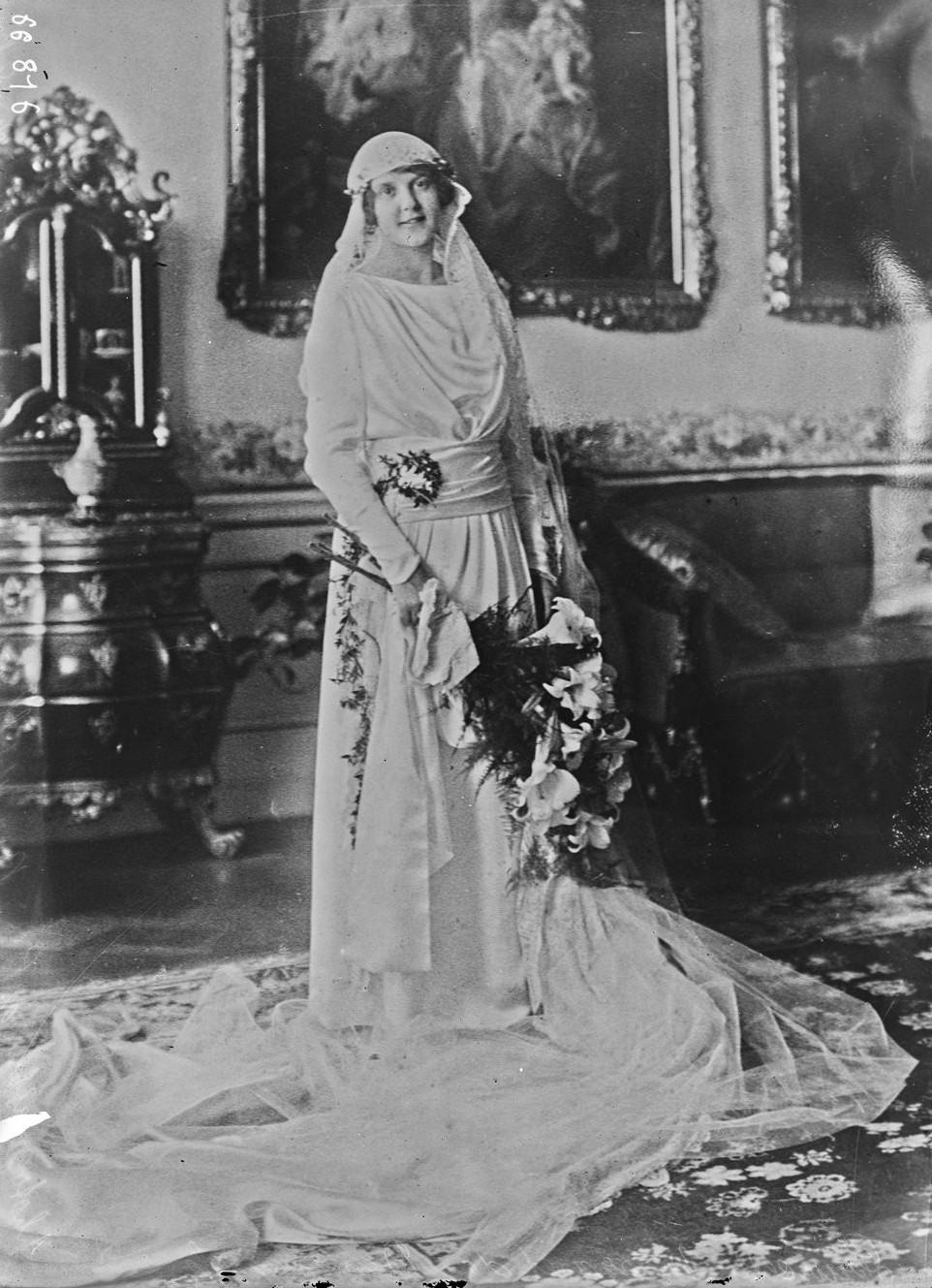
Margaret on her wedding day, 1921

Raised a Catholic, Margaret married a Catholic prince, her mother's relative, Prince René of Bourbon-Parma (Schwarzau, 17 October 1894 – Hellerup, Copenhagen, 30 July 1962) on 9 June 1921 at Sacred Heart of Jesus Church in Copenhagen. His father was Robert I, Duke of Parma. His mother was the Duke's second wife Infanta Maria Antonia of Portugal, daughter of the exiled King Miguel I of Portugal. René was the brother of Empress Zita of Austria and Prince Felix of Bourbon-Parma, the consort of Grand Duchess Charlotte of Luxembourg.

René and Margaret had four children:

- Prince Jacques of Bourbon-Parma (9 June 1922 – 5 November 1964; traffic accident outside Roskilde) married Countess Birgitte of Holstein-Ledreborg (descendant of Count Ludvig Holstein-Ledreborg, former Prime minister of Denmark), on 9 June 1947. They had three children and two grandsons.
- Princess Anne of Bourbon-Parma (18 September 1923 – 1 August 2016) she married King Michael I of Romania on 10 June 1948. They had five daughters.
- Prince Michel of Bourbon-Parma (4 March 1926 – 7 July 2018) he married firstly Princess Yolande de Broglie-Revel on 9 June 1951 and they had five children and twelve grandchildren. They divorced in 1966. He married secondly Princess Maria Pia of Savoy, daughter of King Umberto II of Italy, on 17 May 2003.
- Prince André Marie of Bourbon-Parma (6 March 1928 – 22 October 2011) he married Marina Gacry on 2 May 1960. They had three children and six grandchildren:
  - Sophie Tania (b.1961) married Gilbert Silly dit Bécaud (b.1953)
  - Astrid Marie (b.1964)
  - Axel André Pierre Marie (b. 19 Sep 1967) married Raphaële de Montagnon (b.Paris 9 Jun 1971). They had three children:
    - Côme Axel Marie (b.1997)
    - Alix Jehanne Marina (b.2000)
    - Aure Ghislaine Marie (b.2004)

=== Later life ===
The family was poor compared to other royalty. They chiefly resided in France, where all of their children were born. In 1939 the family fled from the Nazis and escaped to Spain. From there they went to Portugal and then to the United States. There, in New York, Margaret made a living making hats while her husband worked at a gas company and her daughter as a shop assistant. Her sons were studying in Montreal. They returned to Paris after the war. In June 1951, Margaret was travelling in a car her husband was driving when they ran over a 22-year-old man, Jaja Sorensen, who died soon after being taken to hospital.

Together with her husband and their sons Jacques and André, she took part in the ship tour organized by King Paul and Queen Frederica of Greece in 1954, which became known as the “Cruise of the Kings” and was attended by over 100 royals from all over Europe.

She died one day after her 97th birthday, on the 69th birthday of her daughter Anne. She was the last surviving grandchild of Christian IX.
