= Prince Radu of Romania =

Husband of Margareta, Custodian of the Crown of Romania (born 1960)

Radu
- Prince consort of Romania (titular)
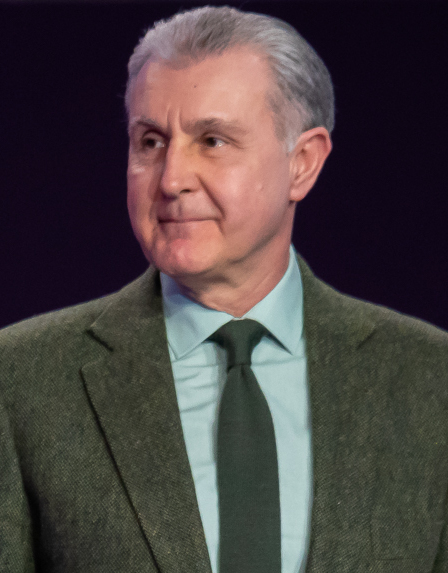
- Radu in 2024
- Born: Radu Duda; 7 June 1960 (age 66); Iași, Romanian People's Republic
- Spouse: Viorica Tanta Begnescu (m. 1989; div. 1992) Margareta of Romania (m. 1996)
- Father: René Corneliu Duda
- Mother: Gabriela Eugenia Constandache
- Religion: Romanian Orthodox

Prince Radu of Romania (born Radu Duda on 7 June 1960, formerly known as Prince Radu of Hohenzollern-Veringen from 1999 to 2007) is the husband of Margareta of Romania, who is the head of the House of Romania and a disputed pretender to the former Romanian throne. On 1 January 1999, he was given the name, not title, of "Prince of Hohenzollern-Veringen" by Friedrich Wilhelm, Prince of Hohenzollern, the head of the Sigmaringen branch of the Hohenzollern family. He has also called himself "Radu Hohenzollern-Veringen-Duda". Since 2007, when he had his legal name changed from "Radu Duda" to "Radu al României Duda", Radu no longer uses the name of Hohenzollern. The Fundamental Rules of the Romanian Royal Family, proclaimed by former King Michael I on 30 December 2007, gave Radu the title of "Prince of Romania", with the style of "Royal Highness", which King Michael had given him earlier on 5 January 2005.

On 16 August 1989 at Bucharest, Radu Duda married Viorica Tanta Begnescu; this marriage was dissolved by divorce on 12 November 1992. In 1996 (24 July, civilly; 21 September, religiously), he married Princess Margareta, eldest daughter of King Michael I of Romania and Queen Anne.

As spouse of Princess Margareta, Radu often accompanies his wife, sometimes solo, to support social projects and promote the Romanian economy. He is also the patron and a member of numerous Romanian charities and organisations.

== Early life ==
Radu was born in Iași, Socialist Republic of Romania, the elder of the two children of Professor Dr. René Corneliu Duda and his wife, Dr. Gabriela Eugenia Duda née Constandache. His only brother is Professor Gabriel Dan Duda.

== Education and work ==
Radu graduated from the Costache Negruzzi High School in Iași in 1979, and from the University of Drama and Film in Bucharest in 1984, and had over twenty years of artistic activity in Romania as well as in other European countries, the Americas, Asia, and Africa. He was the artistic director of the first art therapy project for abandoned children in Romanian orphanages. The project, started in 1993, was developed in eight cities over six years. In 1994, while working as an art therapist in orphanages, he met Princess Margareta, when she was touring the programmes of her Princess Margareta Foundation. On 24 July 1996, Margareta married Duda in a civil wedding at Versoix. On 21 September 1996 they were married religiously in Lausanne, and on 1 January 1999 he was granted the title "Radu, Prince of Hohenzollern-Veringen".

In 2002, he graduated from the National College of Defence of Romania, and the George C. Marshall College, Garmisch, Germany. In August 2004 he participated in the two-week Program for Senior Executives in National and International Security at the John F. Kennedy School of Government at Harvard University.

In September 2002, he was appointed as Special Representative of the Romanian Government for Integration, Co-operation and Sustainable Development. He is also Patron of the British-Romanian Chamber of Commerce, Member of the Board of Directors of "House of NATO" Association in Bucharest, and Honorary Member of the Senate of "Aurel Vlaicu" University of Arad and of the University of Oradea, Romania.

Prince Radu is the author of several books: Dincolo de mască (Bucharest: Unitext, 1997), L'Âme du masque (Brussels, 1998), Război, un exil, o viață (Bucharest, 2000; translated into English as Anne of Romania: A War, an Exile, a Life, Bucharest: Romanian Cultural Foundation, 2002), Michael of Romania: A Tribute (San Francisco and Bucharest, 2001), Kildine (Bucharest, 2003; a translation into Romanian of the fairy-tales book of Queen Marie of the Romanians), Seven (Bucharest: Nemira, 2003), The Royal Family of Romania (Bucharest: Humanitas, 2004), Persona (Bucharest: Nemira, 2006), The Elisabeta Palace (Bucharest: Humanitas, 2006).

Prince Radu's lectures address topics related to Romania's integration into the Euro-Atlantic structures, defense, and security, geopolitics and diplomacy, culture, economics, and education. He has equally spoken out about the issue of ethnic minorities, in particular about the Romani minority, an important issue for Romania and South Eastern Europe today, through conferences in Romania and around Europe, in countries such as the United Kingdom, France, Finland, etc. His activity report "2005 Annual Report and 2002–2004 Retrospective" is available in English and Romanian on his official website.

Prince Radu currently serves on the Board of Advisors to the Global Panel Foundation, an NGO that works behind the scenes in crisis areas around the world.

== Initiatives ==
=== Europe of Regions ===
Radu initiated a project to promote Romania's major interests and to strengthen Romania's bilateral relations. Its aims are to encourage and promote economic, cultural, and educational partnerships between Romanian regions and different European regions, as well as to raise awareness about Romania through meetings, conferences, and lectures. It will involve Prince Radu visiting up to four different regions a year, meeting local businessmen, political and local administration leaders, university teachers and students, Romanian communities and the press. Regions covered so far are the Italian regions of Tuscany and Sicily (provinces of Palermo, Caltanisetta, Enna, and Catania), the French regions of Provence-Alpes-Côte d’Azur and Aquitaine (Pays Beaumontois). The Europe of Regions initiative will continue with visits to the Lands of Germany, to Spain, and further regions of France and Italy.

=== The Friendship Tour ===
The Friendship Tour is a similar initiative created to promote Romania's major interests, mainly in the United States of America, aiming to encourage, promote, and support Romanian partnerships in the economic, educational, and cultural domains. Visits are planned to 3–4 states each year to meet local businessmen and women, politicians, and local administration, university teachers and students, as well as the Romanian diaspora. The aim is also to raise awareness about Romania's potential and to strengthen bilateral relations. The Friendship Tour kicked off with a ten-day visit to the states of Illinois, Indiana, and Massachusetts, during which Prince Radu met with governors, mayors, state congressmen, professors, students, businessmen, journalists, and American citizens of Romanian origin. The Friendship Tour II and The Friendship Tour III plan to reach five other USA states.

== Personality ==
In an interview for Observator Plus, Prince Radu talked frankly about himself. He says that during communism he had lived in an amoral world that lacked role models and where it was difficult to have principles. He discovered the latter only when he met King Michael, when he realized that "life can be marked, here and there, by principles."

== Controversies ==
=== Corruption accusations ===
BAE Systems, one of the donors to Princess Margareta's charity, and its representatives, have been involved in a corruption scandal regarding the purchase by the Romanian Government of two decommissioned UK Royal Navy frigates refurbished by BAE, for which an alleged £7 million bribe was paid. Some of this money, it is also alleged, "ended up in the pockets of the royal family of Hohenzollern". The Gardianul newspaper, noting that both Margarita and Radu, as Special Representative of the Government, had met a number of times formally or informally with the BAE Systems representatives before and after the signing of the governmental contract, inquired whether the royal family was involved in any lobbying on behalf of the company. In an official communique sent to the newspaper, Radu denied any such lobbying activities, stating that as patron of the British-Romanian Chamber of Commerce in which BAE Systems is a member, he met with this as well as other British companies' representatives.

=== Securitate informer ===
Radu has been the target of press attacks for having been an informer for Communist Romania's dreaded Securitate, the secret police, during Nicolae Ceaușescu's dictatorship.

Căminul românesc magazine from Geneva published an article by Nicolette (Nicoleta) Franck, a journalist close to King Michael, about whom she wrote many books. The article alleged that Radu Duda was a Securitate agent infiltrated in the Royal House so as to compromise it, on orders from Ion Iliescu, the former high ranking Communist who served as President of Romania and was, allegedly, a friend of Radu's father, also a former high ranking Communist. No proof of these allegations was offered.

In an article published by the Adevărul daily, Radu denied allegations of his supposed involvement with the Securitate: "I have not collaborated with the Securitate…in 1986 there was an attempt to recruit me. I refused politely and I was never contacted again." The article revealed that in 1989 Radu's name was found on a list of 1,000+ people entitled "support persons" of the Securitate. In another interview for the same daily, Radu explained that in 1986 he had been asked by the Securitate to collaborate due to his successful career as an actor: "Everybody who was somebody knew that there was this risk" to be called upon by Securitate to become an informer. At that time Radu had been working on an Iași stage as a theatre graduate for two years and was about to go on his second and last theatre tour abroad to Israel, accompanying two renowned Romanian actors. The former head of the local Iași branch of the Securitate explained in an interview that a "support person" such as Duda and the other people on the 1,000+ list were not informers, did not sign any agreement with the Securitate, nor did they receive money, but were Communist Party members, in particular people who traveled abroad, targeted by the Securitate with the Party's approval to carry out well-defined missions for a limited period of time. He also confirmed in a subsequent interview that the list in question is real.

It has also been reported that "many of the royal family's supporters have stopped offering financial aids after Radu Duda joined the Royal House. Wealthy Romanians in exile, who have been surveyed by the communist era political police Securitate even in subway stations, considered the compromise as intolerable."

In 2005 Radu sued Marco Houston and Sena Julia Publications, the publishers of Royalty Magazine. The case arose due to an article that was published in the magazine in 2004. On 15 July 2010, Radu obtained a Statement in Open Court from Marco Houston, editor of Royalty Magazine, acknowledging that all the accusations were untrue, that Radu was never a member or collaborator of the Securitate, and that this should never have been published. The statement also confirmed that the Collegium of the National Council for the Study of the Securitate Archives has found Prince Radu did not support in any way the Securitate.

=== Princely title ===
On 1 January 1999, Friedrich Wilhelm, Prince of Hohenzollern, granted Radu an ad personam title of "Prince of Hohenzollern-Veringen" (German: Prinz von Hohenzollern-Veringen). In August 2004, representatives of Friedrich Wilhelm's eldest son Karl Friedrich, Hereditary Prince of Hohenzollern, accused Radu of using the Hohenzollern name without permission as well as of having demanded "considerable" sums of money from whoever may be interested in buying it. Karl Friedrich also warned Radu that the Hohenzollern family would take "legal measures" in case these things were to happen again and demanded that he cease to use the title of "Prince of Hohenzollern-Veringen". In a 2009 interview, Karl Friedrich re-iterated these demands and stated that his father has no right to issue titles in a republic, calling Radu's title "of Hohenzollern-Veringen" a "farce." Since then King Michael has severed all ties with the House of Hohenzollern-Sigmaringen, ordering that all such titles once used were no longer appropriate for use by any member of the Romanian Royal House.

=== Military rank ===
Some sources have contested the legality of Radu's rapid rise in the Romanian Army from a reserve lieutenant (locotenent-major in Romanian) to the rank of active colonel in much less time than that prescribed for ordinary advancements. The former Chief of Army Staff has argued that his activation was done at Radu's own request, while his promotion was granted for "extraordinary" merits, such as Radu's lobby for Romania's admission into NATO. Radu's official response argues, however, that his own activation was not as a result of any unilateral request, but of a joint request of both the Royal House and the Defence Ministry.

== Political support ==
Between September 2002 and September 2008, Radu maintained an official position as Special Representative of the Romanian Government under two successive administrations, that of the centre-left Partidul Social Democrat (PSD) coalition government as well as that of the centre-right Justice and Truth Alliance coalition government. Meanwhile, the main pro-monarchist party Christian-Democratic National Peasants' Party (PNȚCD), which holds no seats in the parliament, has been rejecting any role for him or Princess Margareta in a restored monarchy. In 2003, however, the Cluj branch of PNȚCD officially invited Princess Margareta to be its candidate to the Senate in the upcoming elections. The former president of Romania Traian Băsescu does not appreciate Prince Radu and thinks he is detrimental to the Romanians' public perception of the idea of monarchy. The Romanian historian and avowed monarchist Neagu Djuvara also considers Radu as detrimental, as an "undertaker" to the cause of the Romanian monarchy. On 17 September 2008 Radu resigned his governmental position.

In a 2004 poll conducted by the PSD, of whose coalition government he was at that time the Special Representative, Prince Radu scored just 3.4% as a potential candidate in the upcoming Romanian presidential elections. In a more recent 2006 opinion poll taken by an institute affiliated with the Royal House in running many of its public events and its hospitality management school, 48.80% of those questioned answered that it would be good for Prince Radu to accept a state function, while 46.41% were of the opposite opinion. The same 2006 poll showed that 66% of the Romanians interviewed would like to see a more active involvement of the Royal House in the democratisation and development of Romania. In a 2008 poll, Radu was preferred as president of Romania by 2.6% of the Romanian electorate. In the presence of Princess Margareta, Prince Radu announced his candidacy for the Romanian Presidency in a press conference at the Elisabeta Palace in Bucharest, Romania, on 9 April 2009. Five months later, on 2 September 2009, he retracted his candidacy.

== Honours ==
=== Dynastic ===
- Knight Grand Cross of the Order of Carol I
- Knight Grand Cross of the Order of the Crown of Romania
- Member, Special Class of the Royal Decoration of the Custodian of the Crown of Romania

=== Ecclesiastical ===
- Romanian Orthodox Church: Knight of the Order of the Mother of God of Prayer

=== National ===
- Romania: Recipient of the Medal of Honour of the Land Forces

=== Foreign ===
- Czech Republic: Recipient of the Medal of the Cross of Merit of the Ministry of Defence, 2nd Class
- Sovereign Military Order of Malta: Knight Grand Cross of the Order of Merit
- Sweden: Recipient of the 70th Birthday Medal of King Carl XVI Gustaf
- United Kingdom: Recipient of the King Charles III Coronation Medal

=== Awards ===
==== National ====
- Romania: Honorary Citizen of the Cluj County
- Romania: Honorary Citizen of Iași

==== Foreign ====
- Switzerland: Honorary degree of the Geneva School of Diplomacy and International Relations

== Ranks ==
- Romania: Colonel of the Romanian Armed Forces

== Filmography ==
- Laissez-passer (2002) .... Andrejew
- Ciocârlia (2002) (TV) ....
- Capitaine Conan (1996) .... Insp. Stefanesco

Prince Radu of Romania House of Romania Born: 7 June 1960
Titles in pretence
Vacant Title last held by Princess Anne of Bourbon-Parma as queen consort (titular)	— TITULAR — Prince consort of Romania; 5 December 2017 – present Reason for succession failure: Soviet occupation of Romania and forced abdication of King Michael I leads to Abolition of monarchy	Incumbent
