= Prince René of Bourbon-Parma =

Son of Robert I, Duke of Parma

Prince René
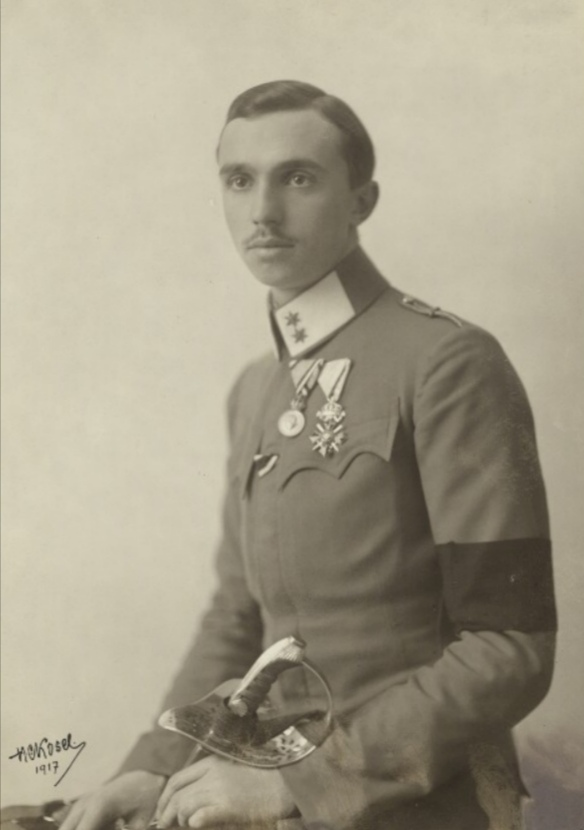
- René in 1917
- Born: 17 October 1894; Schwarzau am Steinfeld
- Died: 30 July 1962 (aged 67); Copenhagen, Denmark
- Spouse: Princess Margaret of Denmark (m. 1921)
- Issue: Prince Jacques; Anne, Queen of Romania; Prince Michel; Prince André
Names
- Italian: Renato Carlo Maria Giuseppe di Borbone-Parma
- House: Bourbon-Parma
- Father: Robert I, Duke of Parma
- Mother: Infanta Maria Antonia of Portugal

Prince René of Bourbon-Parma (17 October 1894 – 30 July 1962) was the seventh surviving son of Robert I, Duke of Parma, and his second wife, Infanta Maria Antonia of Portugal. In 1921, he married Princess Margaret of Denmark. They had four children including Anne, the wife of Michael I, former King of Romania.

== Early life ==
Prince René of Bourbon-Parma was the nineteenth child among the twenty four children of the last reigning Duke of Parma, Robert I (1848–1907). Prince Rene's mother was Duke Robert's second wife, Princess Maria Antonia, a daughter of the exiled King Miguel I of Portugal. By his father's first and second marriages, Rene had seventeen siblings who survived childhood. Two of the most famous included Empress Zita of Austria and Prince Felix, the consort of Charlotte, Grand Duchess of Luxembourg. Prince Rene was born in Schwarzau am Steinfeld. He was raised in Austria. Educated at the Theresianum in Vienna, he graduated from a military academy and served at the Imperial and Royal armed forces as a cavalry officer.

During World War I, René's brothers, Princes Sixtus and Xavier decided to fight for the cause of the allies, while René and his brothers, Elias, Duke of Parma and Felix fought on the opposite side joining the Austrian Army and the cause of the central powers. Their sister, Zita, was married to Archduke Charles of Austria, who became the Austrian Emperor on November 21, 1916. At the fall of Habsburg monarchy in 1918, Prince René moved to France.

== Marriage and children ==
On 9 June 1921, Prince René married Princess Margaret of Denmark in Copenhagen. She was a daughter of Prince Valdemar of Denmark (himself a younger son of Christian IX of Denmark) by his wife Princess Marie of Orléans. Though her father was a Lutheran, Margaret had been raised in her mother's Catholic faith. Her parents had agreed before the marriage that all their sons would be raised as Lutherans, their father's religion, and that all their daughters would be raised as Roman Catholics.

The couple had four children:

Name	Birth	Death	Notes
Prince Jacques of Bourbon-Parma	9 June 1922	5 November 1964 (aged 42)	married 1947 to Countess Birgitte Alexandra Maria af Holstein-Ledreborg (1922–2009), descendant of Count Ludvig Holstein-Ledreborg, former Prime minister of Denmark; had issue
Princess Anne of Bourbon-Parma	18 September 1923	1 August 2016 (aged 92)	married king Michael I of Romania; had issue
Prince Michel of Bourbon-Parma	4 March 1926	7 July 2018 (aged 92)	married 1st, Princess Yolande de Broglie-Revel, 5 children; married 2nd, Princess Maria Pia of Savoy, daughter of King Umberto II of Italy, no issue
Prince André of Bourbon-Parma	6 March 1928	1 October 2011 (aged 83)	married 1960 to Marina Gacry; had issue (including Princess Tania de Bourbon Parme). His descent from Louis XIII was confirmed by DNA in 2013.

Prince René was a French citizen. A few weeks before the birth of their first child, René and his wife traveled to Paris for a few weeks in order to ensure he was born on French soil. The birth was witnessed by René's three brothers. Although Prince René's father had been very wealthy, René's own personal fortune was not large. Nevertheless, he enjoyed a comfortable existence with his wife and their children. They lived in a large villa in Saint-Maurice, Val-de-Marne. The family's prosperity was reduced during financial crisis in the 1920s and 1930s.

== Later life ==
At the outbreak of World War II, Prince René tried to join the French Army, unable to do it, he traveled to Finland, where he volunteered for service with the Finnish army. He received a mission from the commander-in-chief, Field Marshal Baron Mannerheim, to acquire support for Finland from France and Italy, a task more suitable for him than fighting.

His three eldest children joined the allied effort. His sons, Jacques and Michel, fought in Europe and the Far east. His daughter, Anne, trained as a mechanic in Morocco. René's wife, Princess Margaret, fled from the Nazis in 1939 and escaped to Spain. From there she went to Portugal and then to the United States. In September 1944, Prince René witnessed the liberation of Luxembourg, where his brother, Prince Felix, was the consort of Grand Duchess Charlotte.

After the war ended, Prince René settled with his wife in Denmark. In 1947, they took their daughter, Anne, to the wedding of Queen Elizabeth II and Prince Philip, both of whom, like Princess Margaret, were direct descendants of Christian IX of Denmark. At the wedding, Princess Anne met her future husband King Michael I of Romania.

In 1953, Prince René was halted by irate motorists for driving while intoxicated, according to a police statement. As a result, Frederik IX of Denmark forbade René from driving an automobile in Denmark for a year. Frederick apparently told René to find someone else to drive him if the Prince desired to travel somewhere within the year.

Together with his wife and their children Jacques and André, he took part in the ship tour organized by Queen Frederica and her husband King Paul of Greece in 1954, which became known as the “Cruise of the Kings” and was attended by over 100 royals from all over Europe.

In 1964, René's eldest son, Prince Jacques, was killed. He was a motor sport enthusiast, and died in a traffic accident on a highway in Denmark. René himself died on 30 July 1962 at the age of 67.

== Ancestry ==
Ancestors of Prince René of Bourbon-Parma

8. Charles II, Duke of Parma
4. Charles III, Duke of Parma
9. Princess Maria Teresa of Savoy
2. Robert I, Duke of Parma
10. Prince Charles Ferdinand, Duke of Berry
5. Princess Louise of Artois
11. Princess Marie Caroline of Naples and Sicily
1. Prince René of Bourbon-Parma
12. John VI of Portugal and Brazil
6. Miguel I of Portugal
13. Infanta Carlota Joaquina of Spain
3. Infanta Maria Antónia of Portugal
14. Constantine, Hereditary Prince of Löwenstein
7. Princess Adelaide of Löwenstein
15. Princess Agnes of Hohenlohe-Langenburg
