= Prince Michel of Bourbon-Parma =

French soldier and racer (1926–2018)

Prince Michel
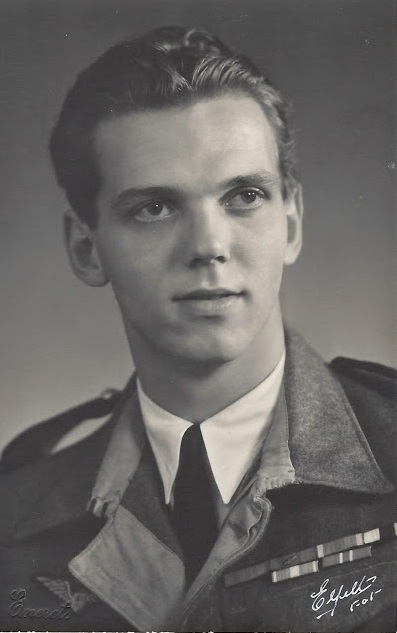
- Michel of Bourbon-Parma in 1948
- Born: 4 March 1926; Paris, France
- Died: 7 July 2018 (aged 92); Neuilly-sur-Seine, France
- Spouse: Princess Yolande de Broglie-Revel (m. 1951; div. 1999) Princess Maria Pia of Savoy (m. 2003)
- Issue: Princess Inès; Prince Erik; Princess Sybil, Mrs. Richards; Princess Victoire, Mrs. Rodriguez; Prince Charles-Emmanuel; Princess Amélie
Names
- Michel Marie Xavier Waldemar Georg Robert Karl Eymar
- House: Bourbon-Parma
- Father: Prince René of Bourbon-Parma
- Mother: Princess Margaret of Denmark
- Religion: Roman Catholicism

Prince Michel of Bourbon-Parma (Michel Marie Xavier Waldemar Georg Robert Karl Eymar de Bourbon-Parme; 4 March 1926 – 7 July 2018) was a French prince, businessman, soldier and racing car driver, who was a member of the deposed sovereign royal and ducal House of Bourbon-Parma.

He was a son of Prince René of Bourbon-Parma and his wife Princess Margaret of Denmark. Paternally, he was a grandson of Robert I, Duke of Parma (1848–1907), while through his mother he was a great-grandson of Christian IX of Denmark. Prince Michel was also the younger brother of Anne of Romania.

== Biography ==
Prince Michel grew up in Paris, where his father worked for a propane gas tank manufacturer. In 1940, Prince Michel and his family fled the German invasion and left for New York City, where his mother worked in a hat shop. Michel was enrolled in a Jesuit school in Montreal, the Collège Jean-de-Brébeuf.

Three years later, at age 17, he joined the U.S. Army with his father's permission, and was commissioned as a lieutenant. Serving in Operation Jedburgh, he was parachuted into Nazi-occupied France as part of a three-man sabotage team (with Maj. Tommy Macpherson and Sgt O. A. Brown) to operate deep behind German lines.

After the liberation of France, Prince Michel was deployed to the First Indochina War in order to fight against the Viet Minh. Dropped on 28 August 1945 by parachute, he was captured the same day by the Viet Minh, who kept him prisoner for eleven months, during which his group of six captives attempted several escapes and were recaptured. They were led from camp to camp through the dense jungle, bound together with strips of bamboo. Each lived on a bowl of rice a day. Toward the end of the ordeal, the men were asked to sign statements saying that they had been well treated, which they refused. Four of them were killed before the two survivors finally made it back to France due to the French negotiating a ceasefire agreement with the Viet Minh at the Geneva Conference. Prince Michel was one of 3000 prisoners to survive of the 12,000 French prisoners taken by the Viet Minh. A chevalier of France's Legion of Honour, for his services during war, he was also awarded the British Military Cross and the Croix de Guerre.

Demobilized at the age of 20, the prince became a race car driver, participating in the Le Mans 24 Hours in 1964 and 1966. Both times his car failed to finish. In 1964, he also raced in the Tour de France Automobile where he finished second. At the Monaco Grand Prix in 1967, he was a nearby spectator when the Lorenzo Bandini accident occurred: With the help of a marshal he managed to extract the driver from the burning wreck of his Ferrari.

Prince Michel started civilian life at the age of 20, engaging in business over the following decades. He worked for a company that had created the Zodiac inflatable rubber boat, which enjoyed huge commercial success after the war. Later, he negotiated contracts for French companies with Mohammad Reza Pahlavi, Shah of Iran, until he was deposed in the Islamic revolution of 1979. In later life, he lived between his house in Neuilly-sur-Seine, France and his house in Palm Beach, Florida.

== Marriages and children ==
Following a civil wedding in Paris on 23 May 1951, on 9 June, the thirtieth anniversary of his parents' wedding, he married religiously at Chaillot, Princess Yolande de Broglie-Revel (1928–2014), daughter of Prince Joseph de Broglie-Revel (1892–1963) and his wife, Marguerite de La Cour de Balleroy (1901-1976).

Although the couple separated legally on 26 June 1966 and reconciled 19 December 1983, the marriage ended in divorce in 1999. They had five children together:

- Princess Inès Marie Joseph Margarethe Yolande Tatiana of Bourbon-Parma (9 May 1952 – 20 October 1981), she had a daughter out of wedlock:
  - Marie Mélodie de Bourbon (born Geneva, 4 June 1977). Adopted by her grandfather, Prince Michel, 20 November 1982.
- Prince Erik Marie Joseph René Michel Pierre of Bourbon-Parma (28 August 1953 – 21 January 2021 in Copenhagen), married in Ledreborg, Denmark, on 8 August 1980 Countess Lydia of Holstein-Ledreborg (born 22 February 1955), daughter of Princess Marie Gabrielle of Luxembourg, divorced in 1999. They had five children:
  - Princess Antonia Monica Charlotte Marie of Bourbon-Parma (born Roskilde, 10 June 1981). Married on 15 May 2010 to Martin Krusbaek at Ledreborg Castle, Denmark. They have four children.
  - Princess Marie Gabrielle Yolande Camilla Philippine of Bourbon-Parma (born Paris, 23 December 1982). Married on 17 October 2022 to Martin Kjeldsen at Ledreborg Castle, Denmark. She had one son (out of wedlock).
  - Princess Alexia Thérèse Sybille Erica Marie of Bourbon-Parma (born Palm Beach, Florida, 7 March 1985). Married in 2007 to Fabian Davis. They have two daughters.
  - Prince Michel Knud John Joseph Marie of Bourbon-Parma (born Roskilde, 12 February 1989). Married in 2024 Countess Anna Luisa Schaffgotsch genannt Semperfrei von und zu Kynast und Greifenstein. They have one son:
    - Prince Erik (b. 2024).
  - Prince Henri Luitpold Antoine Victor Marie Joseph of Bourbon-Parma (born Roskilde, 14 October 1991). Married on 12 September 2020 to his second cousin, Archduchess Gabriella of Austria, at Tratzberg Castle, Jenbach, Tyrol, Austria. They have three daughters:
    - Princess Victoria Antonia Marie-Astrid Lydia of Bourbon-Parma (b. 30 October 2017, Geneva, Switzerland).
    - Princess Anastasia Erika Alexandra Marie Yolande of Bourbon-Parma (b. 3 July 2021, Geneva, Switzerland).
    - Princess Philippine Alexandra Marie-Gabrielle Immaculata of Bourbon-Parma (b. 8 December 2022, Geneva, Switzerland)
- Princess Sybil Marie Josephine Anne Victorie of Bourbon-Parma (born Paris, 10 November 1954), married in 1997 Craig Richards.
- Princess Victoire Maria Pia Joseph Philippe Isaure of Bourbon-Parma (8 November 1957 – 2001), married on 26 February 1974 in Beaumont-le-Roger and divorced before 1988, Baron Ernst Alexis von Gecmen-Waldek (born Prague, 11 July 1943) before remarrying in 1993, with Carlos Ernesto Rodriguez. She had two children with her first husband:
  - Baroness Tatiana von Gecmen-Waldek (born 22 June 1974), married Michael Berger-Sandhofer in September 1995 in Versailles.
  - Baron Vincent Nicholas von Gecmen-Waldek (born 30 August 1981)
- Prince Charles-Emmanuel Joseph Jacques Hély of Bourbon-Parma (born Paris, 3 June 1961), married on 25 May 1991, Baroness Constance de Ravinel (born Paris, 18 July 1971), daughter of Yves, Baron de Ravinel and Alix de Castellane-Esperron (of the Dukes of Almazán de Saint Priest). They have four children:
  - Prince Amaury Yves Michel Marie Joseph of Bourbon-Parma (born Boulogne-Billancourt, 30 October 1991). Married civilly on 4 June 2023 and religiously on 8 July in Sully to Pélagie de Mac Mahon (born 24 June 1990), daughter of 4th Duke of Magenta. They have two daughters:
    - Princess Sybille Marie Zita Amélie Constance Joseph of Bourbon-Parma (born Paris, 25 December 2023).
    - Princess Aliénor Yolande Cherry Charlotte Marie Joseph of Bourbon-Parma (born September 2025)
  - Princess Charlotte Alexe Yolande Marie Joseph of Bourbon-Parma (born Boulogne-Billancourt, 18 July 1993). Married on 25 June 2022 to Javier Valladares Urruela at the Church Saint-Aubin de Tourouvre, Tourouvre au Perche, Normandy, France.
  - Princess Elisabeth Flore Angélique Marie Joseph of Bourbon-Parma (born Boulogne-Billancourt, 12 June 1996). Married on 6 July 2024 to Xavier Denis at the Church Saint-Aubin, Tourouvre au Perche, Normandy, France.
  - Princess Zita Angélique Inès Marie Joseph of Bourbon-Parma (born Boulogne-Billancourt, 1 April 1999)

Prince Michel had a daughter out of wedlock with Laure Le Bourgeois (born 1950):

- Amélie (born 13 March 1977), legally adopted by her father on 5 June 1997, assuming the surname "de Bourbon-Parme". She married in October 2009 to Igor Bogdanoff at Château de Chambord.

In 2003, he married Princess Maria Pia of Savoy (born 1934), daughter of King Umberto II and Queen Maria José of Italy, who had divorced Prince Alexander of Yugoslavia.

== Ancestry ==
Ancestors of Prince Michel of Bourbon-Parma

8. Charles III, Duke of Parma
4. Robert I, Duke of Parma
9. Princess Louise of Artois
2. Prince René of Bourbon-Parma
10. Miguel I of Portugal
5. Infanta Maria Antónia of Portugal
11. Princess Adelaide of Löwenstein
1. Prince Michel of Bourbon-Parma
12. Christian IX of Denmark
6. Prince Valdemar of Denmark
13. Princess Louise of Hesse-Kassel
3. Princess Margaret of Denmark
14. Prince Robert, Duke of Chartres
7. Princess Marie of Orléans
15. Princess Françoise of Orléans

== Bibliography ==
- (in French) Michel de Bourbon, En parachute, Presses de la Cité, 1949 ASIN B0000DPIAZ
- (in Danish) Michel de Bourbon, Faldskaermsjaeger : Fra den franske maquis til Indo-Kinas jungle, Hasselbalch, 1949
- (in French) Michel de Bourbon-Parme et Jean-Louis Tremblay, Un prince dans la tourmente, Nimrod, 2010 ISBN 291524328X
