= Stephen Hung =

Hong Kong businessman

- 洪永時
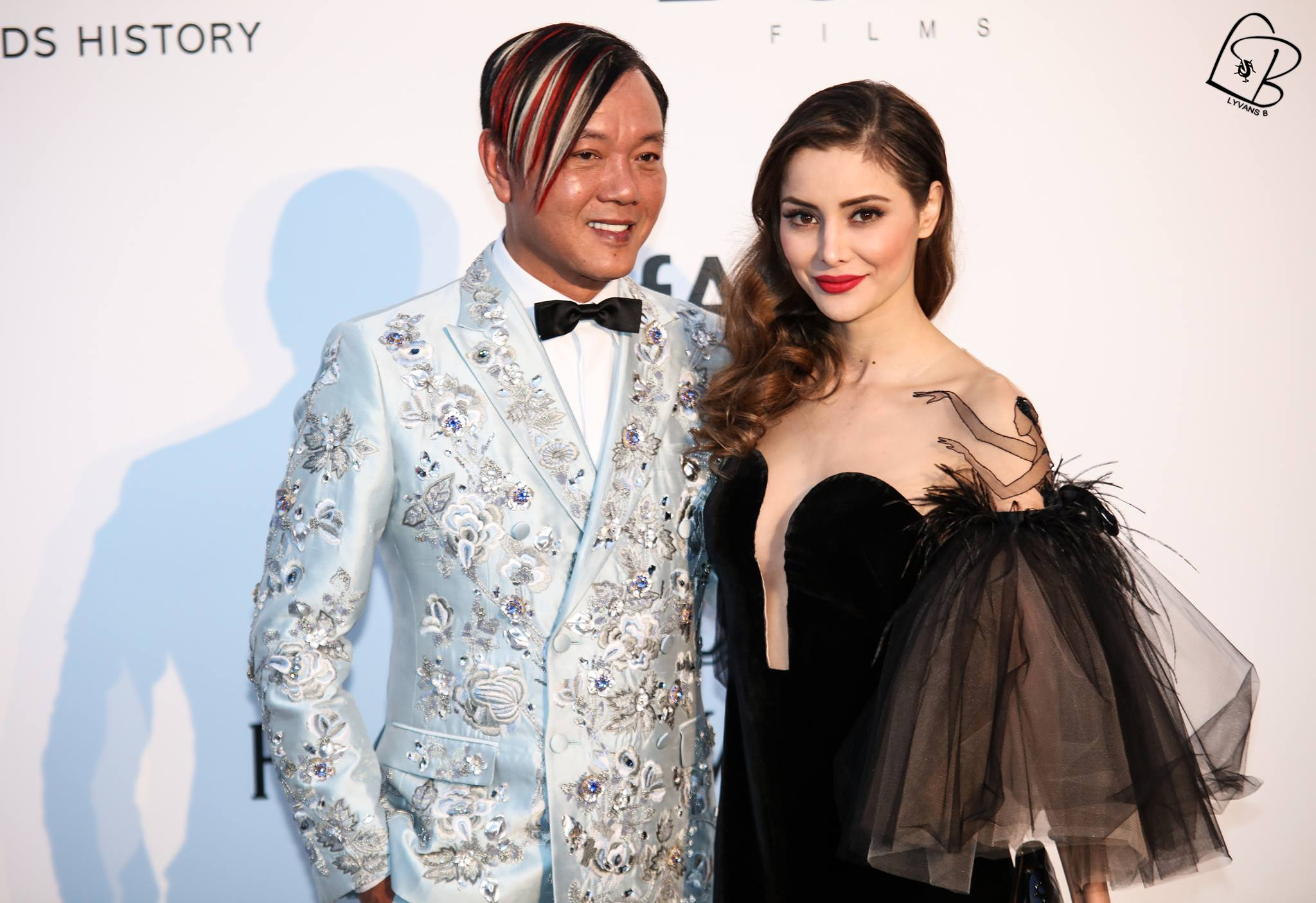
- Hung and wife in 2016
- Born: 1959 (age 66–67)
- Education: Columbia University; University of Southern California
- Occupation: Businessman
- Spouse: Deborah Valdez Hung
- Website: www.the13.com

Stephen Hung (born 1959, Chinese: 洪永時) is a Hong Kong businessman.

He was the joint chairman of Hong Kong-listed The 13 Holdings Limited. He is the chairman of The Taipan Investment Group and vice-chairman of Rio Entertainment Group, which operates the Rio Hotel & Casino in Macau.

== Career ==
Hung was educated at Columbia University and the University of Southern California, where he earned a master's degree in business administration.

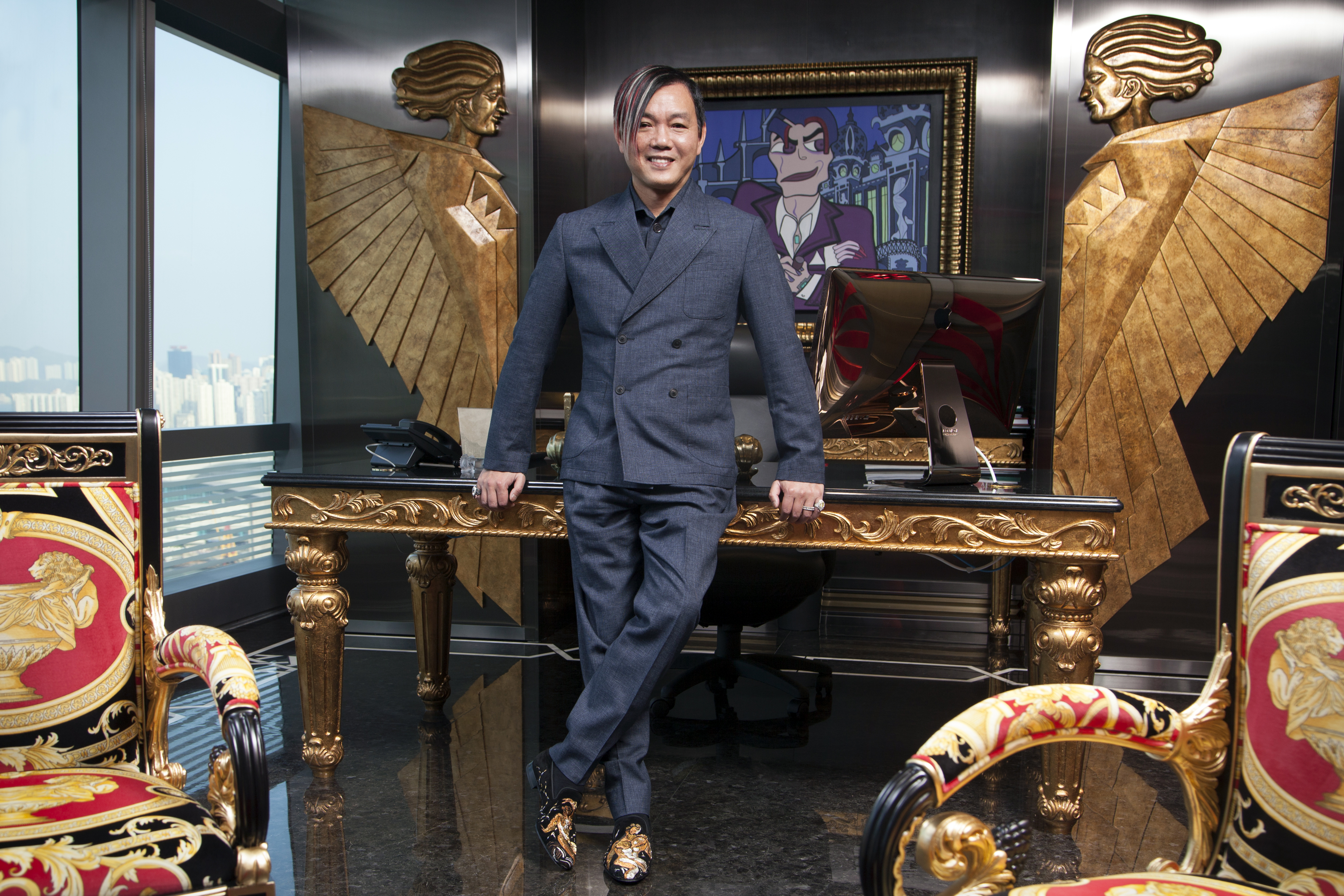
Stephen Hung in 2014

=== Operations ===
He later formed his own investment company. Hung has also previously served as the Vice Chairman of eSun Holdings and as a non-executive director of Lippo Group's AcrossAsia Limited.

In 2013 he set about developing a luxury casino-resort in Macau, under the name Louis XIII, with the help of Princess Tania de Bourbon Parme. By 2017, the project was lavishly built and under a new name 'The 13', but was in financial difficulties, having neither opened nor been awarded a casino licence.

Hung's main vehicle and the operating company for the project, 13 Holdings Limited, had targeted extremely wealthy officials and the business elite from the People's Republic of China. However, in 2014, Chinese Communist Party's general secretary Xi Jinping, in Macau for its 15th anniversary as an SAR, announced his government's displeasure at such ostentatious excess, as part of his crackdown on corruption, which severely impacted the project's ambitions. The company sold a 52 percent stake in its engineering subsidiary Paul Y Engineering.

== Family ==
Hung's parents were property agents.
