= Prince Jacques of Bourbon-Parma =

French Prince

Prince Jacques
- Born: 9 June 1922; Longwy, France
- Died: 5 November 1964 (aged 42); Near Roskilde, Denmark
- Spouse: Countess Birgitte of Holstein-Ledreborg (m. 1947)
- Issue: Prince Philippe; Princess Lorraine Charlotte; Prince Alain
Names
- Jacques Marie Antoine Robert Valdemar Charles Felix Sixte Ansger
- House: Bourbon-Parma
- Father: Prince René of Bourbon-Parma
- Mother: Princess Margrethe of Denmark

Prince Jacques of Bourbon-Parma (Jacques Marie Antoine Robert Valdemar Charles Felix Sixte Ansger; 9 June 1922 – 5 November 1964) was a French prince, pilot and racing car driver, from the House of Bourbon-Parma.

He was the brother of Anne of Romania and a first cousin of Tsar Boris III of Bulgaria and Jean, Grand Duke of Luxembourg.

== Life ==
Jacques was born in Longwy, France, on 9 June 1922, his parents' first wedding anniversary. He was the eldest child of Prince René of Bourbon-Parma and Princess Margrethe of Denmark. His parents were residing in Luxembourg but crossed the border for his birth as they wanted their son to be a French citizen. Paternally, he descended from Robert I, Duke of Parma; maternally, he descended from King Christian IX of Denmark. He was raised in Paris and attended the American School MacJannet in Saint-Cloud where his classmates included Prince Philip of Greece and Denmark.

After the fall of Paris, Jacques and his mother and siblings fled to Portugal via Spain. From there, the Danish Consulate in Paris secured him and his mother passage to New York on the SS Excalibur. They arrived in New York in October 1940, staying initially at the Waldorf Astoria Hotel. Jacques and his brother were sent to Collège Jean-de-Brébeuf, a Jesuit school in Montreal. Here, he trained in the Canadian Officers' Training Corps.

On 23 November 1942, Jacques enlisted in the Royal Norwegian Air Force. Though recent policy changes had been enacted to curb the number of foreign volunteers in the service, Jacques's application was accepted, likely because King Haakon VII of Norway was his mother's cousin. He trained in Canada and the United Kingdom. He flew ambulance service in northern Norway, even after the war's end, before being discharged on 1 May 1946.

On 9 June 1947, Jacques married Countess Birgitte of Holstein-Ledreborg (1922–2009), a descendant of Count Ludvig of Holstein-Ledreborg, sometime council president of Denmark. They had three children:

- Prince Philippe George Karl Valdemar René Joseph Marie of Bourbon-Parma (born 22 January 1949) who married Annette Smith in 1979. They have two sons.
- Princess Lorraine Charlotte Tatjana Ebba Johanna Maria Antonia Josephine Renée of Bourbon-Parma (born 27 July 1951)
- Prince Alain Jean Knud Bernhard Felix Maria René Joseph of Bourbon-Parma (born 15 May 1955) who married Inge Birgitte Vedel Andersen in 2001, without issue.

After the war, he settled in Denmark. He worked for Danish Air Lines and Danish Air Taxa before retiring from flying in 1949 and working for the meat company Kristoffersen & Dehn. In the 1950s, he became interested in motor racing. He was protector of the Roskilde Ring and chairman of the Roskilde Motor and Rally Club. He won the 1959 Danish Touring Car Championship in the 1001-1300 cm3 class.

Jacques was killed on 5 November 1964 when he collided with a truck head-on near Roskilde. He is buried in Lejre near Ledreborg, the ancestral seat of his wife's family.

== Honours ==
- 1947: King Christian X's Liberty Medal

== Ancestry ==
Ancestors of Prince Jacques of Bourbon-Parma

8. Charles III, Duke of Parma
4. Robert I, Duke of Parma
9. Princess Louise of Artois
2. Prince René of Bourbon-Parma
10. Miguel I of Portugal
5. Infanta Maria Antónia of Portugal
11. Princess Adelaide of Löwenstein
1. Prince Jacques of Bourbon-Parma
12. Christian IX of Denmark
6. Prince Valdemar of Denmark
13. Princess Louise of Hesse-Kassel
3. Princess Margrethe of Denmark
14. Prince Robert, Duke of Chartres
7. Princess Marie of Orléans
15. Princess Françoise of Orléans
