= Katarina Adanja =

Yugoslav art historian

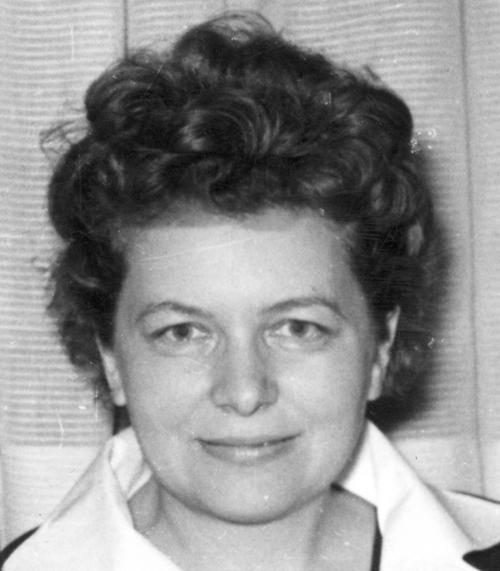
- Born: 17 December 1921; Subotica, Kingdom of Serbs, Croats, and Slovenes (present-day Serbia)
- Died: 12 September 1989 (aged 67); Belgrade, SFR Yugoslavia
- Education: University of Belgrade
- Occupation: Art historian
- Spouse: Solomon Adanja
- Children: Mira Adanja-Polak; Đorđe Adanja; Gordana Adanja-Grujić

Katarina Adanja (Subotica, December 17, 1921 – Belgrade, September 12, 1989), was an art historian from Yugoslavia.

== Biography ==
Katarina Adanja was born on December 17, 1921, in Subotica in a Sephardic Jewish family, daughter to Aladar and Olga Baruch. Aladar Baruch was the owner before the Second World War, and after the war an advisor in an export-import company that sold poultry in England, Germany, and Switzerland. Olga Baruch worked in the family business as an auditor and bookkeeper. After finishing primary school, Katarina studied at lyceums in Vienna and Switzerland. In Belgrade, Katarina met her future husband, Solomon Adanja, who would become a renowned Yugoslav urologist and surgeon in the Yugoslav People's Army. Solomon, by then working as a visiting physician, came to Katarina's family, which had arrived from Budapest to visit her sick aunt and relatives in the then Danube Banovina.

During World War II, she hid with her husband and was captured and retained in a camp in Budapest for a time. Katarina's father survived the horrors of the Bergen-Belsen concentration camp, and her mother and sister Vera were killed in Auschwitz. Together, they had three children: Mira Adanja-Polak, a journalist and TV host, Đorđe Adanja, a urologist and surgeon, and Gordana Adanja-Grujić, a biochemist expert in gastroenterology.

== Professional career ==
After World War II, she worked in the Hungarian editorial office of Radio Yugoslavia, and graduated in art history at the Faculty of Philosophy of the University of Belgrade. As a Hungarian-Serbo-Croatian translator, she worked with the different delegations that negotiated the borders in Bač and the Danube–Tisa–Danube Canal. Together with Agnes Sass and Egon Steiner, she translated Janos Kadar's "Politics of Socialist Hungary" from 1973. She wrote the guidelines for the Yugoslav Encyclopedia of Fine Arts.

As an art curator, she worked at the Postal-Telegraph-Telephone (PTT) Museum, wrote for the museum magazine PTT Glasnik and for PTT Vesnik, an organ of the Association of Workers of the Yugoslav Post, Telegraph and Telephone company. She published the texts in the PTT Vesnik column "Tragom proslosti". She designed and compiled a large number of catalogs and brochures used when postage stamps were published. She published articles about Yugoslavian art in magazines and newspapers such as Politika, Bazaar, Ilustrovana Politika, Književni novini, Nova Makedonija, Pobjeda, Oslobodjenje, Jevrejski pregled, Umetnosti, Telegrama, Jugoslovenske revije, Sveta kulture as well as the French magazine Le Monde de philatelists.

As a member of the Diplomatic International Club, she gave numerous lectures on Yugoslav culture. She opened the exhibition of sculptor Denis Michel at the Cultural Center of Belgrade in 1974. She participated in the work of the jury of the October Salon from 1960 to 1985, and was a member of the Jury Council of the Yugoslav Ceramics Triennial in 1980 and the World Ceramics Festival within the Festival of Yugoslav Art "Marble and Sounds". From 1974 until her death, she was a member of the Postal History Society from New York. She was an honorary member of the Applied Artists and Designers Association of Serbia (ULUPUDS). In 1971, she received a letter of thanks from Kenneth Megill for her contribution, help, and support to the Jewish community in Yugoslavia.

== Works ==
- Niz kataloga za pojedinačne i grupne izložbe likovnih stvaralaca: Gordana Glid (1971), Lucija Bancov Veber (1971), Kosta Đorđević (1972), Đorđe Isakov (1972), Vesna Radosavljević (1972), Mira Sandić (1974), Vladanka Rašić (1978), Stanislava Knez Milošević (1978), Dušan Jovanović (1981), Josip Karakas, Zoran Prvanović, Ljubica Vukobratović, Danica Beba Cigarčić, Arigo Vitler, Mirjana Lehner Dragić
- Yugoslav mosaic, 1969
- Biseri izdatih serija jugoslovenskih maraka, 1971
- Poštonoše u Starom Egiptu, 1971
- Počeci poštanske službe u Rusiji, 1974
- Biblija i saobraćaj
- Kako je funkcionisala pošta u koncentracionim logorima, 1974
- Umetnička dela kao motivi na poštanskim markama, Nemački ministar za belim stolom nezvanično, 1976
- Mai Beográdi müvészet, 1977 (katalog)
- Ljubica D. Vukobradović: watercolours, 1980 (catalog)
- 100 slikara i kipara, 1985
- Ilija Filipović: Likovna galerija Savremenici, 1988 (catalog)
- Ingrid Krane: akvareli, 1989 (catalog)
- Tragika porodice Baruh, (book)

== Death ==
Adanja died in 1989. After her death, she was posthumously awarded with the ULUPUDS Lifetime Achievement Award in 1989.
