= Anne of Romania =

Wife of former King of Romania (1923–2016)

Anne
- Queen consort of Romania (titular)
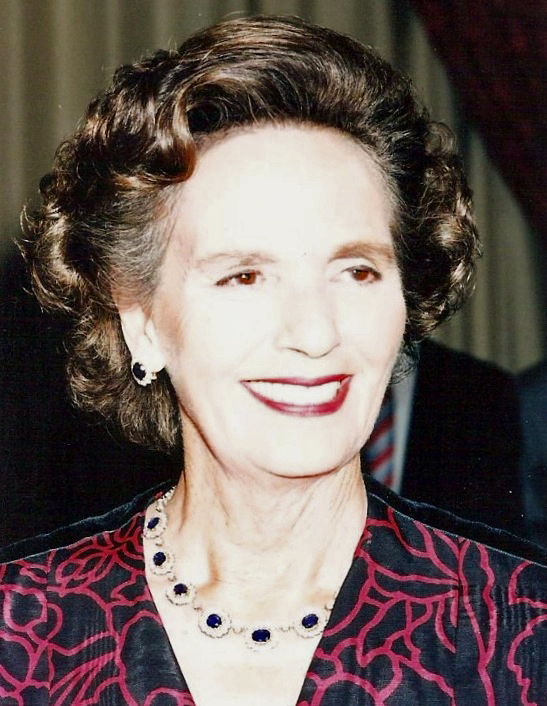
- Anne at the Romanian French Community gala in Paris, 1991
- Born: Princess Anne of Bourbon-Parma; 18 September 1923; Paris, France
- Died: 1 August 2016 (aged 92); Morges, Vaud, Switzerland
- Burial: 13 August 2016; Curtea de Argeș Cathedral, Romania
- Spouse: Michael I of Romania (m. 1948)
- Issue: Margareta, Custodian of the Crown of Romania; Princess Elena; Princess Irina; Princess Sofia; Princess Maria
Names
- Anne Antoinette Françoise Charlotte Zita Marguerite
- House: Bourbon-Parma
- Father: Prince René of Bourbon-Parma
- Mother: Princess Margaret of Denmark

Anne (born Princess Anne Antoinette Françoise Charlotte Zita Marguerite of Bourbon-Parma; 18 September 1923 – 1 August 2016) was the wife of King Michael I of Romania. She married Michael in 1948, the year after he had abdicated the throne. Nonetheless, she was known after the marriage as Queen Anne (Romanian: Regina Ana).

== Early life ==
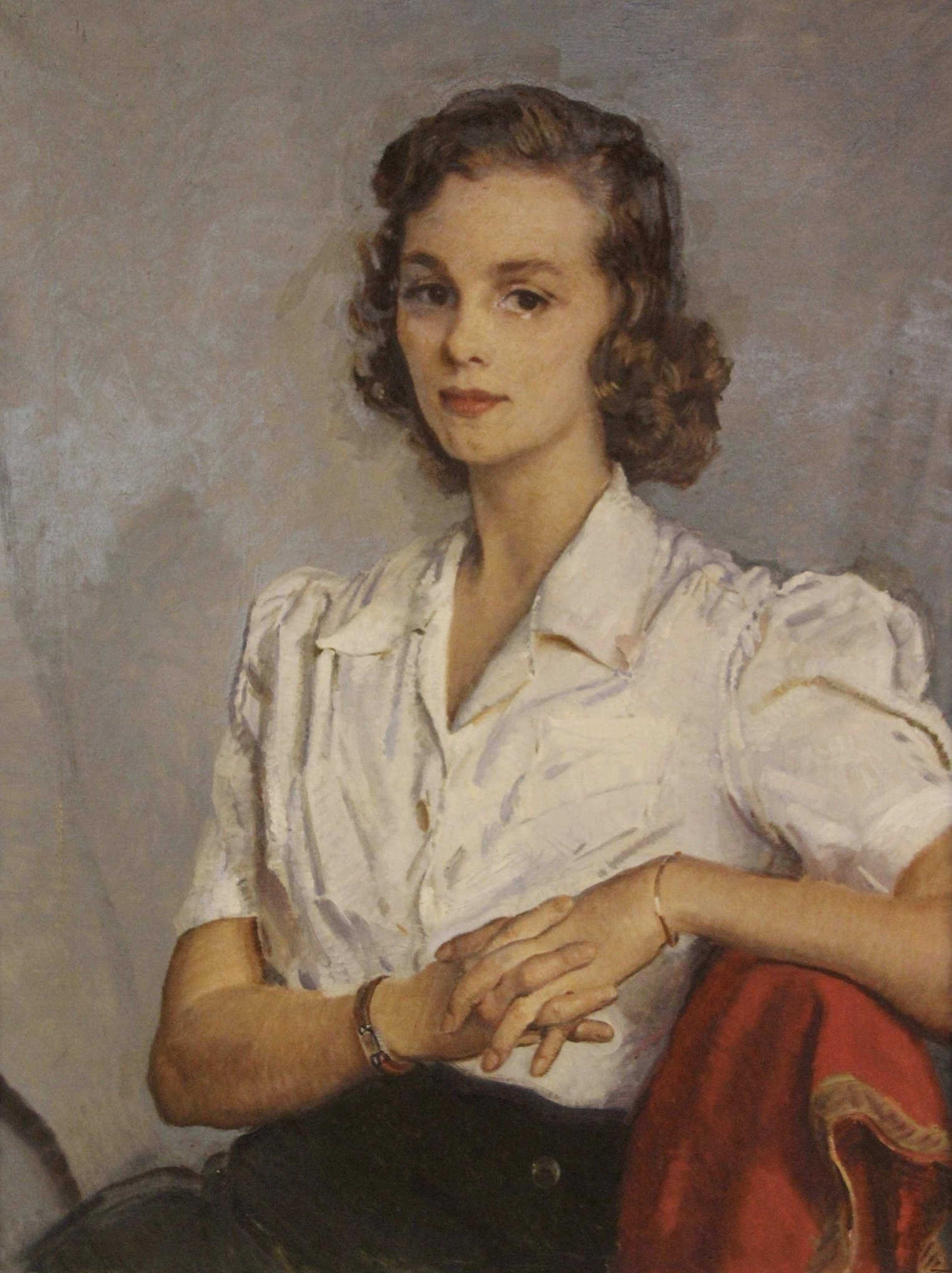
Princess Anne of Bourbon-Parma. Portrait by Ned Murray, 1943.

Princess Anne of Bourbon-Parma was born on 18 September 1923 in Paris, France, as the only daughter of Prince René of Bourbon-Parma and Princess Margaret of Denmark. With her three brothers she spent her childhood in France. To her family she was known as Nane (in English Nan).

Their holidays were spent alternately at the Villa Pianore in Lucca with their paternal grandmother the Dowager Duchess of Parma, or at Bernstorff Palace in Copenhagen with their maternal grandfather. Anne's paternal aunt was the last Austrian Empress Zita while her maternal great aunts were Empress Maria Feodorovna of Russia and Queen Alexandra of the United Kingdom. In 1939, her family fled from the Nazis and escaped to Spain. From there they went on to Portugal and then to the United States. She attended the Parsons School of Design in New York City from 1940 to 1943. She also worked as a sales assistant at Macy's department store. In 1943, she volunteered for military service in the French Army. She served in Algeria, Morocco, Italy, Luxembourg and in liberated Germany, as an ambulance driver. Anne received the French Croix de Guerre for her wartime service.

== Marriage ==
=== Engagement ===
In November 1947, Anne met Michael I of Romania, who was visiting London for the wedding of Princess Elizabeth and Philip Mountbatten. A year earlier, Queen Mother Helen had invited Anne, her mother, and brothers for a visit to Bucharest, but the plan did not come off. Meanwhile, Michael had glimpsed Anne in a newsreel and requested a photograph from the film footage.

Anne did not want to accompany her parents to London for the royal wedding as she wished to avoid meeting King Michael in official surroundings. Instead, she planned to stay behind, go alone to the Paris railway station and, pretending to be a passerby in the crowd, privately observe the king as his entourage escorted him to his London-bound train. However, at the last moment she was persuaded by her first cousin, Prince Jean of Luxembourg, to come to London, where he planned to host a party. Upon arrival in London, she stopped by Claridge's to see her parents, and found herself being introduced unexpectedly to King Michael. Abashed to the point of confusion, she clicked her heels instead of curtseying, and fled in embarrassment. Charmed, the king saw her again the night of the wedding at the Luxembourg embassy soirée, confided in her some of his concerns about the Communist takeover of Romania and fears for his mother's safety, and nicknamed her Nan. They saw each other several times thereafter on outings in London, always chaperoned by her mother or brother.

A few days later, Anne accepted an invitation to accompany Michael and his mother when he piloted a Beechcraft aeroplane to take his aunt Princess Irene, Duchess of Aosta, back home to Lausanne. Sixteen days after meeting, Michael proposed to Anne while the couple were out on a drive in Lausanne. She initially declined, but later accepted after taking long walks and drives with him. Although Michael gave her an engagement ring a few days later, he felt obliged to refrain from a public announcement until he informed his government, despite the fact that the press besieged them in anticipation.

Michael returned to Romania, where he was told by the prime minister that a wedding announcement was not "opportune". Yet within days it was used as the government's public explanation for Michael's sudden abdication, which according to royalty "expert" Marlene A. Eilers Koenig was in fact the king's deposition by the Communists on 30 December. Anne was unable to get further news of Michael until he left the country. They finally reunited in Davos on 23 January 1948.

=== Wedding ===
As a Bourbon, Anne was bound by the canon law of the Catholic Church, which required that she receive a dispensation to marry a non-Catholic Christian (Michael was Orthodox). At the time, such a dispensation was normally only given if the non-Catholic partner promised to allow the children of the marriage to be raised as Catholics. Michael refused to make this promise since it would have violated Romania's monarchical constitution, and would be likely to have a detrimental impact upon any possible restoration. The Holy See (which handled the matter directly since Michael was a member of a reigning dynasty) refused to grant the dispensation unless Michael made the required promise.

Helen, Queen Mother of Romania and her sister Princess Irene of Greece and Denmark, Duchess of Aosta (an Orthodox married to a Catholic prince) met with the fiancée's parents in Paris, where the two families resolved to take their case to the Vatican in person. In early March, the couple's mothers met with Pope Pius XII who, despite the entreaties of the Queen Mother and the fact that her mother pounded her fist on the table in anger, refused permission for Anne to marry Michael.

It has been surmised that the Pope's refusal was, in part, motivated by the fact that when Princess Giovanna of Italy married Anne's cousin, Tsar Boris III of Bulgaria, in 1930, the couple had undertaken to raise their future children as Catholics, but had baptized them in the Orthodox faith in deference to Bulgaria's state religion. However, Michael declined to make a promise he could not keep politically, while Anne's mother was herself the daughter of a mixed marriage between a Catholic (Marie d'Orléans) and a Protestant (Prince Valdemar of Denmark), who had abided by their pre-ne temere compromise to raise their sons as Protestant and their daughter, Margrethe, as Catholic.

Although under a great deal of stress, the engaged couple resolved to proceed. Anne's paternal uncle, Xavier, Duke of Parma, issued a statement objecting to any marriage conducted against the will of the Pope and the bride's family. It was he, not the Pontiff, who forbade her parents to attend the wedding. Michael's spokesman declared on 9 June that the parents had been asked and had given their consent, and that the bride's family would be represented at the nuptials by her maternal uncle, the Protestant Prince Erik of Denmark, who was to give the bride away.

The wedding ceremony was held on 10 June 1948 in Athens, Greece, in the throne room of the Royal Palace; the ceremony was performed by Archbishop Damaskinos, and King Paul of Greece served as koumbaros. Guests at the wedding included: Michael's mother Helen, Queen Mother of Romania, aunts Queen Frederica, Princess Irene of Greece and Denmark, Duchess of Aosta, Princess Katherine of Greece and Denmark; cousins Alexandra, Queen Consort of Yugoslavia, Prince Amedeo, Duke of Aosta, Princess Sophia of Greece and Denmark, Crown Prince Constantine of Greece and Princess Irene of Greece and Denmark, the three youngest ones serving as bridesmaids and pageboy; Anne's maternal uncle Prince Erik of Denmark; Princess Nicholas of Greece and Denmark, Princess Olga of Yugoslavia, Princess Elizabeth of Yugoslavia, Prince George William of Hanover and many other dignitaries. Michael's father, Prince Carol, and his sisters, Maria, Queen Mother of Yugoslavia, Princess Elisabeth of Romania (ex-Queen Consort of Greece) and Princess Ileana of Romania were notified, but not invited.

As no papal dispensation was given for the marriage, when it was celebrated according to the rites of the Eastern Orthodox Church, it was deemed invalid by the Catholic Church. The couple eventually took part in a religious ceremony again, on 9 November 1966, at the Catholic Church of St Charles in Monaco, thus satisfying canon law.

== Adult life ==
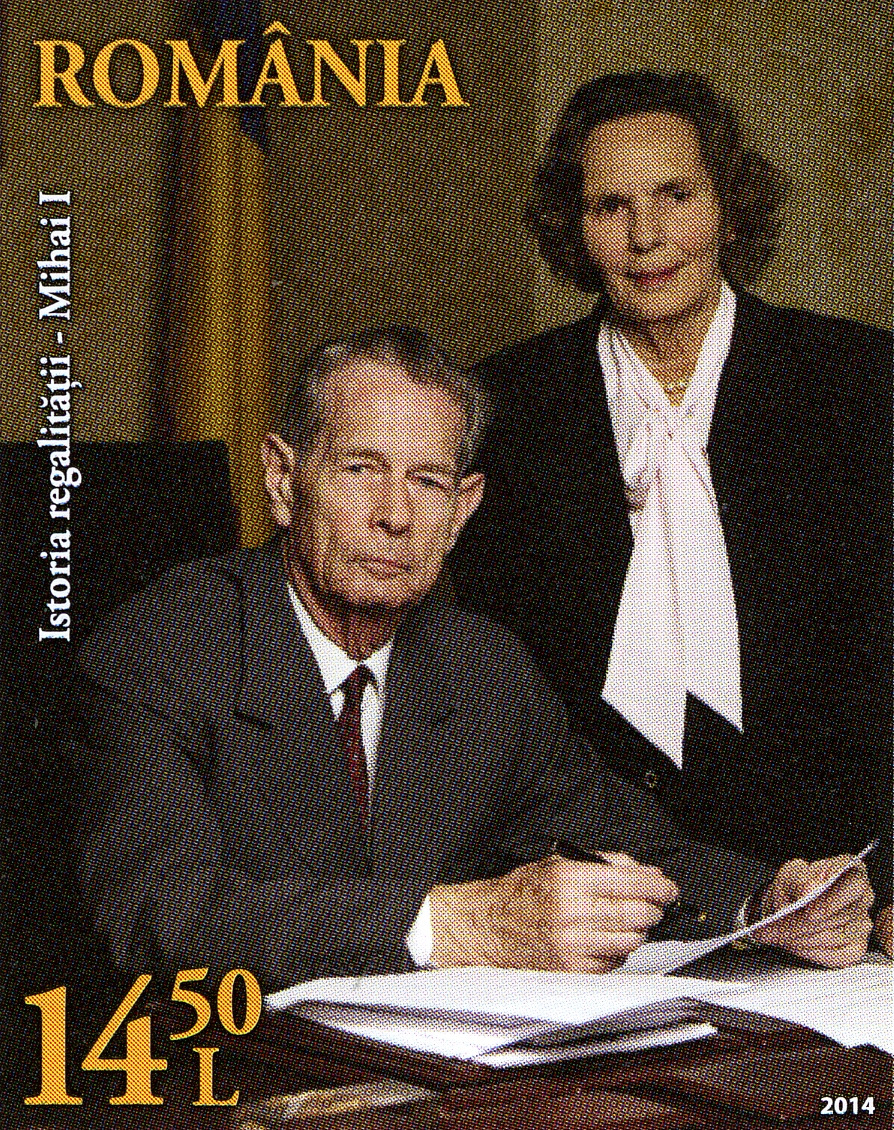
Michael and Anne on a 2014 Romanian stamp

After their wedding in 1948, Anne and Michael rented a house in Hertfordshire for four years, where they became market gardeners and farmed poultry. In 1956 they moved to Versoix on Lake Geneva, and raised five daughters there. In 1992, they visited Romania for three days; it was her first visit to the country. From 1993 to 1997, despite repeated attempts, Michael was refused entry to Romania by the hostile Romanian government. During these years Anne visited the country a number of times representing her husband. After 1997, there were no restrictions on Anne and Michael's entry into Romania. Elisabeta Palace was put at their disposal by the government, and they recovered some properties from the state, including Săvârşin Castle and Peleş Castle.

In June 2008, Anne and Michael celebrated their diamond wedding anniversary with three days of events in Romania, which was the largest celebration the couple ever had since their wedding in June 1948.

- Events were:
  - On the 10th, a concert by the George Enescu Philharmonic Orchestra was held in their honour at the Romanian Athenaeum.
  - On the 11th, there was a reception held at Athenee Palace in Bucharest where members of the Romanian Government and Diplomatic corps had the chance to congratulate the couple.
  - On the 12th, in the morning at the National Museum of Romanian History there was a book release about Anne and King Michael's 60 years together published by Agerpres. In the evening there was a private formal dinner held at Peleș Castle in Sinaia.

Guests at the events included: their two eldest daughters Crown Princess Margareta and Princess Elena, their sons-in-law Prince Radu and Alexander Nixon and Princess Elena's two children: Prince Nicholas and Elisabeta-Karina; Michael's maternal cousins ex-King Constantine II of Greece, Queen Sofía of Spain, Prince Amedeo, Duke of Aosta and Princess Irene of Greece and Denmark who were the original attendants at their wedding in 1948; Queen Anne-Marie of Greece, King Simeon II of Bulgaria and his wife Queen Margarita, Crown Prince Alexander of Yugoslavia and his wife Crown Princess Katherine, Duarte Pio, Duke of Braganza, Maximilian, Margrave of Baden and his wife Archduchess Valerie, Prince Lorenz of Belgium, Archduke of Austria-Este, Princess Silvia, Duchess of Aosta, Princess Marie Astrid of Luxembourg, Prince Philip of Bourbon-Parma and his wife Princess Anette. Attendees also included Representatives of Romania and of the Romanian Government, such as: Prime Minister Călin Popescu-Tăriceanu, Bogdan Olteanu, President of the Chamber of Deputies, Ionel Haiduc, President of the Romanian Academy, Patriarch Daniel and also members of the Diplomatic corps.

== Family ==
Anne and King Michael had five daughters, all of whom have been married and three of whom have children:

- Margareta, Custodian of the Crown of Romania (b. 26 March 1949), married Radu Duda in 1996.
- Princess Elena of Romania (b. 15 November 1950), married Robin Medforth-Mills on 20 July 1983 and was divorced on 28 November 1991. They have two children. She married secondly Alexander McAteer on 14 August 1998.
- Princess Irina of Romania (b. 28 February 1953), married John Kreuger on 4 October 1983, from whom she was divorced on 24 November 2003. They have two children. She married secondly John Wesley Walker on 10 November 2007.
- Princess Sofia of Romania (b. 29 October 1957), married Alain Michel Biarneix on 29 August 1998 and was divorced in 2002, with one child.
- Princess Maria of Romania (b. 13 July 1964), married Kazimierz Wiesław Mystkowski on 16 September 1995 and divorced in December 2003.

Anne was the younger sister of Prince Jacques of Bourbon-Parma and elder sister to Prince Michel of Bourbon-Parma who was the second husband of Princess Maria Pia of Savoy (eldest child of King Umberto II of Italy and Queen Marie José), and Prince André of Bourbon-Parma.

As a granddaughter of Robert I, Duke of Parma she was first cousin to: King Boris III of Bulgaria; Robert Hugo, Duke of Parma; Infanta Alicia, Duchess of Calabria; Carlos Hugo, Duke of Parma; Crown Prince Otto of Austria; and Grand Duke Jean of Luxembourg.

== Death ==
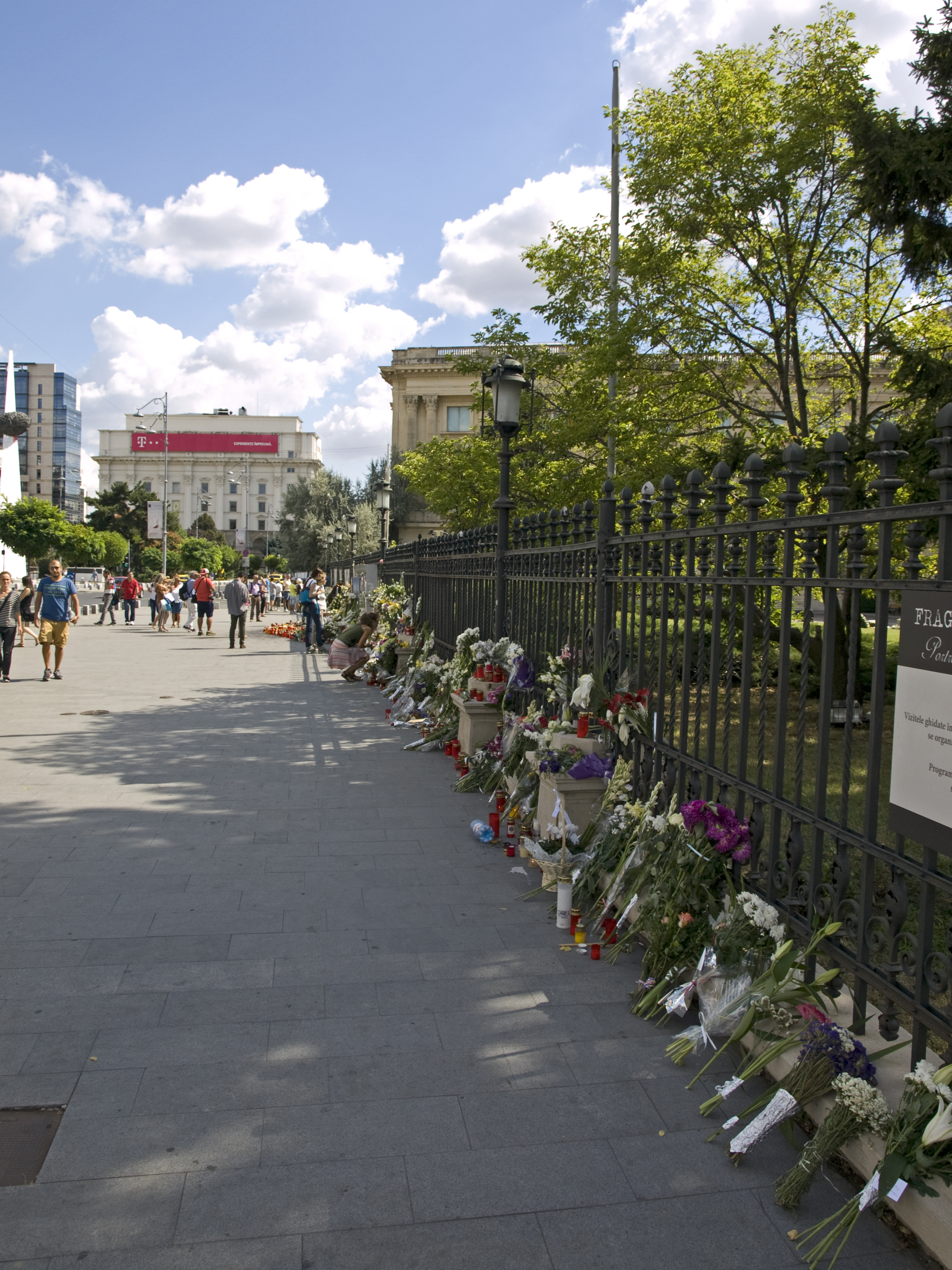
Flowers and candles in front of the fence of the former Royal Palace in Bucharest on 13 August 2016

Anne died on 1 August 2016 in Ehc - Hospital Morges in Morges, Switzerland, at the age of 92. Although the offer to confer a posthumous military medal on her was declined by her family, Romania's President Klaus Iohannis offered condolences to King Michael and the royal family, issuing a statement which described the deceased as devoted to the country whose name she bore, "Her Majesty Queen Ana of Romania will remain forever in memory and in our hearts as one of the most important symbols of wisdom, dignity and, especially, as a model of moral conduct.". The government of Romania declared that 13 August 2016 shall be a national day of mourning, during which the Romanian flag when displayed is to fly at half-mast at all institutions and buildings, private, cultural and partisan as well as public, and television and radio broadcasts are to adapt their programming appropriately in memory of Anne of Romania, whose funeral would be conducted that day at the Curtea de Argeș Cathedral. On 5 August 2016, President Nicolae Timofti of Moldova likewise decreed national mourning on 13 August in memory of Queen Anne, also calling for the republic to observe a moment of silence at 10 am on that day.

In July 2023, to celebrate a century since her birth, the National Bank of Romania launched a 10 Lei silver coin into the numismatic circuit. The obverse of the coin shows Săvârșin Castle with the inscription "ROMANIA" in a circular arc, the coat of arms of Romania, the nominal value "10 LEI" and the year of issue "2023". The reverse of the coin shows the portrait and cipher of Queen Anne and the inscriptions "QUEEN ANE" and "100 YEARS OF BIRTH".

== Honours ==
- France: Recipient of the Croix de Guerre Medal 1939–1945
- Sovereign Military Order of Malta: Dame Grand Cross of Obedience of the Sovereign Military Order of Malta, 2nd Class

=== Dynastic ===
- House of Romania: Knight Grand Cross with Collar of the Order of Carol I
- House of Romania: Knight Grand Cross of the Order of the Crown
- Austrian Imperial and Royal Family: Dame of the Order of the Starry Cross, 1st Class
- Orléans-French Royal Family: Dame Grand Cross of the Order of Saint Lazarus

== Ancestry ==
Ancestors of Anne of Romania

8. Charles III, Duke of Parma
4. Robert I, Duke of Parma
9. Princess Louise of Artois
2. Prince René of Bourbon-Parma
10. Miguel I of Portugal
5. Infanta Maria Antonia of Portugal
11. Princess Adelaide of Löwenstein
1. Queen Anne of Romania
12. Christian IX of Denmark
6. Prince Valdemar of Denmark
13. Princess Louise of Hesse-Kassel
3. Princess Margaret of Denmark
14. Prince Robert, Duke of Chartres
7. Princess Marie of Orléans
15. Princess Françoise of Orléans

Anne of Romania House of Bourbon-Parma Cadet branch of the House of Bourbon Born: 18 September 1923 Died: 1 August 2016
Titles in pretence
Vacant Title last held by Princess Marie of Edinburgh	— TITULAR — Queen consort of Romania; 10 June 1948 – 1 August 2016; Reason for succession failure: Soviet occupation of Romania leads to Abolition of monarchy	Vacant Title next held by Radu Duda as prince consort (titular)
