= Schwarzau am Steinfeld =

- Municipality
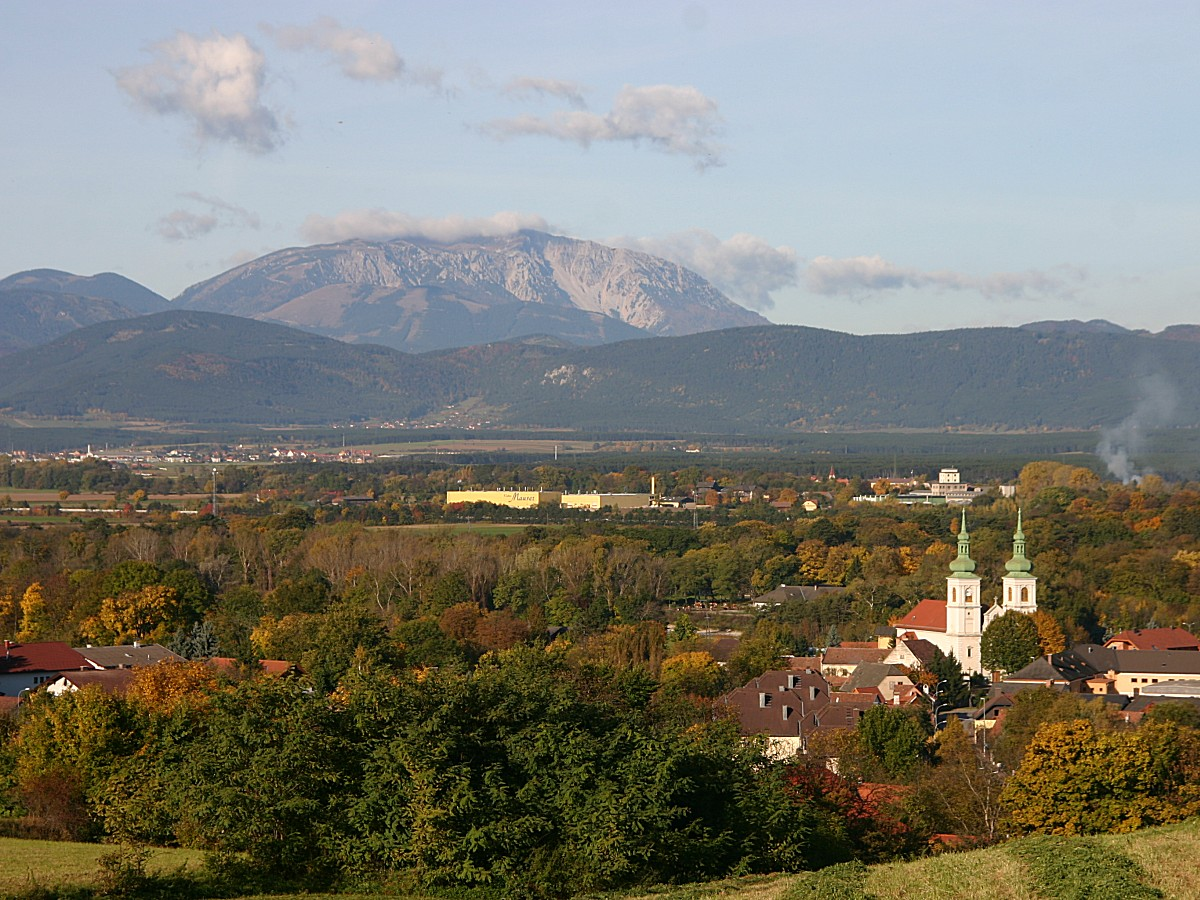
- View of Schwarzau am Steinfeld

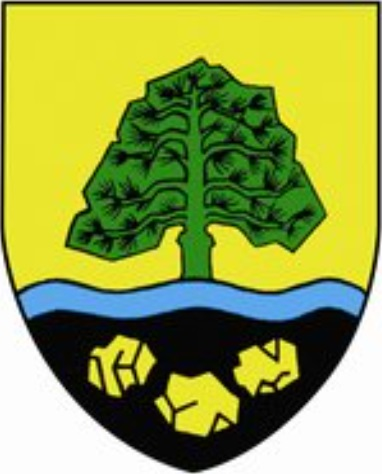
- Coat of arms

- Location within Austria
- Coordinates: 47°43′N 16°10′E
- Country: Austria
- State: Lower Austria
- District: Neunkirchen

Government
  - Mayor: Evelyn Artner (ÖVP)

Area
  - Total: 9.72 km^{2} (3.75 sq mi)
- Elevation: 329 m (1,079 ft)

Population (2018-01-01)
  - Total: 1,924
  - Density: 198/km^{2} (513/sq mi)
- Time zone: UTC+1 (CET)
  - Summer (DST): UTC+2 (CEST)
- Postal code: 2625
- Area code: 02627
- Website: www.schwarzau.at

Schwarzau am Steinfeld is a town in the district of Neunkirchen in the Austrian state of Lower Austria.

== Population ==
Historical population
Year	Pop.	±%
1869	706	—
1880	735	+4.1%
1890	856	+16.5%
1900	954	+11.4%
1910	1,182	+23.9%
1923	1,045	−11.6%
1934	983	−5.9%
1939	1,177	+19.7%
1951	1,136	−3.5%
1961	1,354	+19.2%
1971	1,407	+3.9%
1981	1,364	−3.1%
1991	1,612	+18.2%
2001	1,703	+5.6%
2011	1,890	+11.0%
