= Royalty Magazine =

Royalty Magazine or Royalty Monthly as it was originally called was founded in 1981 by journalist Bob Houston. Houston had previously been the launch editor of Majesty Magazine, a similar publication. Royalty Magazine's launch coincided with the engagement of Prince Charles to Lady Diana Spencer in 1981.

== Publishing history ==
Royalty Magazine was first published in June 1981. The magazine is now edited by Marco Houston who is the son of the founder Bob Houston.

The publisher of the magazine since 1993 has been Sena Julia Publicatus Ltd. Previous publishers have included Quavertree Limited and Bacall Limited. Both companies entered into insolvency and were eventually liquidated.

== Circulation information ==
In 1988, the magazine's circulation was more than 40,000 copies in the United States. By 2007, it was stated that circulation in the United Kingdom was 6,000 copies but worldwide circulation was not disclosed.
