= Romanian royal family =

Former reigning dynasty of Romania

House of Hohenzollern (Romanian branch) House of Hohenzollern-Sigmaringen (Romanian branch) House of Hohenzollern-Romania House of Romania
- Parent house: Hohenzollern (Swabian branch)
- Country: Romania
- Founded: 10 May 1866
- Founder: Carol I
- Current head: Margareta
- Final ruler: Michael I
- Titles: Prince (Domnitor, or Principe) (1866–1881), King (Rege) (1881–1947), Custodian of the Crown of Romania (Custode al Coroanei Române) (2017–present)
- Deposition: 30 December 1947

The Romanian royal family (Romanian: Familia regală a României) constitutes the Romanian subbranch of the Swabian branch of the House of Hohenzollern (also known as the House of Hohenzollern-Sigmaringen), and was the ruling dynasty of the Kingdom of Romania, a constitutional monarchy in Central-Eastern Europe. The kingdom existed from 1881, when Carol I was proclaimed king, until 1947, when the last king, Michael I, was forced to abdicate and the Parliament proclaimed Romania a republic. Soon after, upon the establishment of the constitution of 13 April 1948, Romania became a people's republic, a state that lasted until the Romanian Revolution in 1989.

Current members of the former royal family include the daughters of the late, former King Michael of Romania. Some descendants have adopted the surname "of Romania". There are also descendants of Michael's older half-brother Carol Lambrino (also known as "Carol Hohenzollern" and "Carol Mircea Grigore of Romania" or, in Romanian, al României, on his amended, Romanian birth certificate), whose legitimacy was disputed and who were not recognised as royal during the reigns of Ferdinand, Carol II and Michael.

King Michael publicly renounced for himself, the former queen, and their five daughters any claim to the titles of "Prince/Princess of Hohenzollern", styles which were in any case not recognised under German laws since 1919 but had been attributed, along with the Romanian royal titles, to members of the Romanian dynasty in such subsequently published sources as the Almanach de Gotha and Burke's Guide to the Royal Family.

== Descendants of King Michael ==
The list below includes members of the Romanian royal family, Descendants of King Michael I.

- King Michael I (1921–2017)
  m. (1948) Queen Anne (1923-2016)
  - Margareta, Custodian of the Romanian Crown (born 1949)
    m. (1996) Radu Duda, assumed the title Prince Radu of Romania (b. 1960)
  - Princess Elena (b. 1950)
    div. (1983–1991) Leslie Robin Medforth-Mills (1942–2002)
    m. (1998) Alexander Philips Nixon (McAteer) (b. 1964)
    - Nicholas Michael de Roumanie Medforth-Mills (b. 1985)
      m. (2017) Alina Maria Binder (b. 1988)
      - Maria Alexandra de Roumanie Medforth-Mills (b. 2020)
      - Michael de Roumanie Medforth-Mills (b. 2022)
    - Elisabeta Karina de Roumanie Medforth-Mills (b. 1989)
      m. (2024) Kurt Metcalfe (b. 1990)
      - Augustus Mihai de Roumanie Metcalfe (b. 2024)
  - Princess Irina (b. 1953)
    div. (1983–2003) John Kreuger (b. 1945)
    m. (2007) John Wesley Walker (1945–2024)
    - Michael Torsten de Roumanie Kreuger (b. 1985)
      m. (2011) Tara Marie Littlefield (b. 1982)
      - Kohen Kreuger (b. 2012)
    - Angelica Margareta Bianca de Roumanie Kreuger (b. 1986)
      div. (2009-2018) Richard Robert Knight (b. 1984)
      - Courtney Bianca Knight (b. 2007)
      - Diana Knight (b. 2011)
  - Princess Sofia (b. 1957)
    div. (1998–2002) Alain Michel Léonce Biarneix (aka de Laufenborg) (b. 1957)
    - Eelaz (born Elisabeta-Maria Bianca Elena) de Roumanie Biarneix (b. 1999)
  - Princess Maria (b. 1964)
    div. (1995–2003) Kazimierz Wiesław Mystkowski (b. 1958)

Daughters of Romania's kings, such as Margareta, Elena, Irina, Sofia and Maria, as well as their descendants, had no rights of succession to the Romanian throne during the monarchy's existence, in accordance with the Salic law enshrined in both the defunct royal Romanian Constitution of 1938 and the Statute of the Romanian royal house, dated 1884. On 30 December 2007 in a private ceremony, King Michael issued a declaration in the form of a statute, an act of symbolic significance in the absence of its approval by the Parliament, promulgating new Fundamental Rules of the Royal Family of Romania.

Michael decided to add his daughters and their children to the headship of the royal house, further explicitly banning any other foreigners belonging to any other royal or princely house from succeeding. On the same occasion he asked the Romanian Parliament to abolish the Salic law, should it consider restoring the monarchy. By the same act, Michael designated his grandson Nicholas Medforth-Mills as a future member of the deposed royal family and future "Prince of Romania" with the style of "Royal Highness," effective either on his 25th birthday, 1 April 2010, or upon Michael's death, whichever might occur sooner. On 1 August 2015, however, King Michael issued a declaration retracting the style "Royal Highness" and "of Romania" previously conferred upon Nicholas, also excluding him from the line of succession to the headship of the dynasty, noting that his successors in that capacity should be persons of "principled modesty and morality." Children and consorts of the members of the family who do not bear a royal title are not recognised as members of the former royal family, according to the new rules.

== Line of succession ==
According to the succession provisions of the Romanian kingdom's last democratically approved monarchical constitution of 1923, upon the death of King Michael without sons, the claim to the Crown devolves once again upon the Hohenzollern family. However, on 30 December 2007, on the 60th anniversary of his abdication, King Michael signed the Fundamental Rules of the Royal Family of Romania, by which he designated Princess Margareta as his heir. The document has no legal standing, as it regulates an institution that is no longer extant.

However the Fundamental Rules designated Margareta as heir presumptive to the defunct throne. On the same occasion, Michael also requested that, should the Romanian Parliament consider restoring the monarchy, the Salic law of succession not be reinstated, allowing female succession. According to the new statute of the Romanian Royal House as declared by Michael, no illegitimate descendants or collateral lines may claim dynastic privileges, titles or rank and any such are excluded from the Royal House of Romania and from the line of succession to the throne.

On 10 May 2011, on a background of lawsuits in Germany brought against his family by Michael’s German relatives regarding the former name Hohenzollern-Veringen of his son-in-law, Radu, and of fears expressed by some that the German Hohenzollerns may claim succession to the headship of the Romanian royal house, Michael severed all of the dynastic and historical ties with the princely house of Hohenzollern, changed the name of his family to "of Romania", and gave up all princely titles conferred upon him and his family by the German Hohenzollerns.

On 1 August 2015, Michael signed a document removing the title Prince of Romania and the qualification of Royal Highness from his grandson, Nicholas Medforth-Mills, who was also removed from the line of succession. The former king took the decision "with an eye on Romania's future after the reign and life of his eldest daughter, Margareta". The former king hoped that "Nicholas will find in future years a suitable way to serve the ideals and use the qualities that God gave him". Nicholas's mother, Princess Elena, received notification of the former king's decision in a personal letter.

== Family of Carol Mircea Hohenzollern ==
- Paul-Philippe of Romania (born 1948), son of Carol Mircea Lambrino
  wed Lia-Georgia Hohenzollern (née Triff) (born 1949), with issue:
  - Carol Ferdinand al României (born 2010)
- Alexander Hohenzollern (born 1961), son of Carol Mircea Lambrino, unmarried.

== Past members of the royal family ==
- King Carol I (1839–1914) (Reign as Domnitor: 1866–1881) (Reign as King: 1881–1914)
  m. Queen Elisabeth (1843–1916)
  - Princess Maria (1870–1874)
- King Ferdinand I (1865–1927) (Reign: 1914–1927)
  m. Queen Marie (1875–1938)
  - King Carol II (1893–1953) (Reign: 1930–1940)
    m. Queen Helen (1896–1982)
    - King Michael I (1921–2017) (Reign: 1927–1930 and 1940–1947)
      m. Queen Anne (1923–2016)
  - Princess Elisabeth (1894–1956)
  - Princess Maria (1900–1961)
  - Prince Nicholas (1903–1978)
  - Princess Ileana (1909–1991)
  - Prince Mircea (1913–1916)

== Family tree ==
Family tree

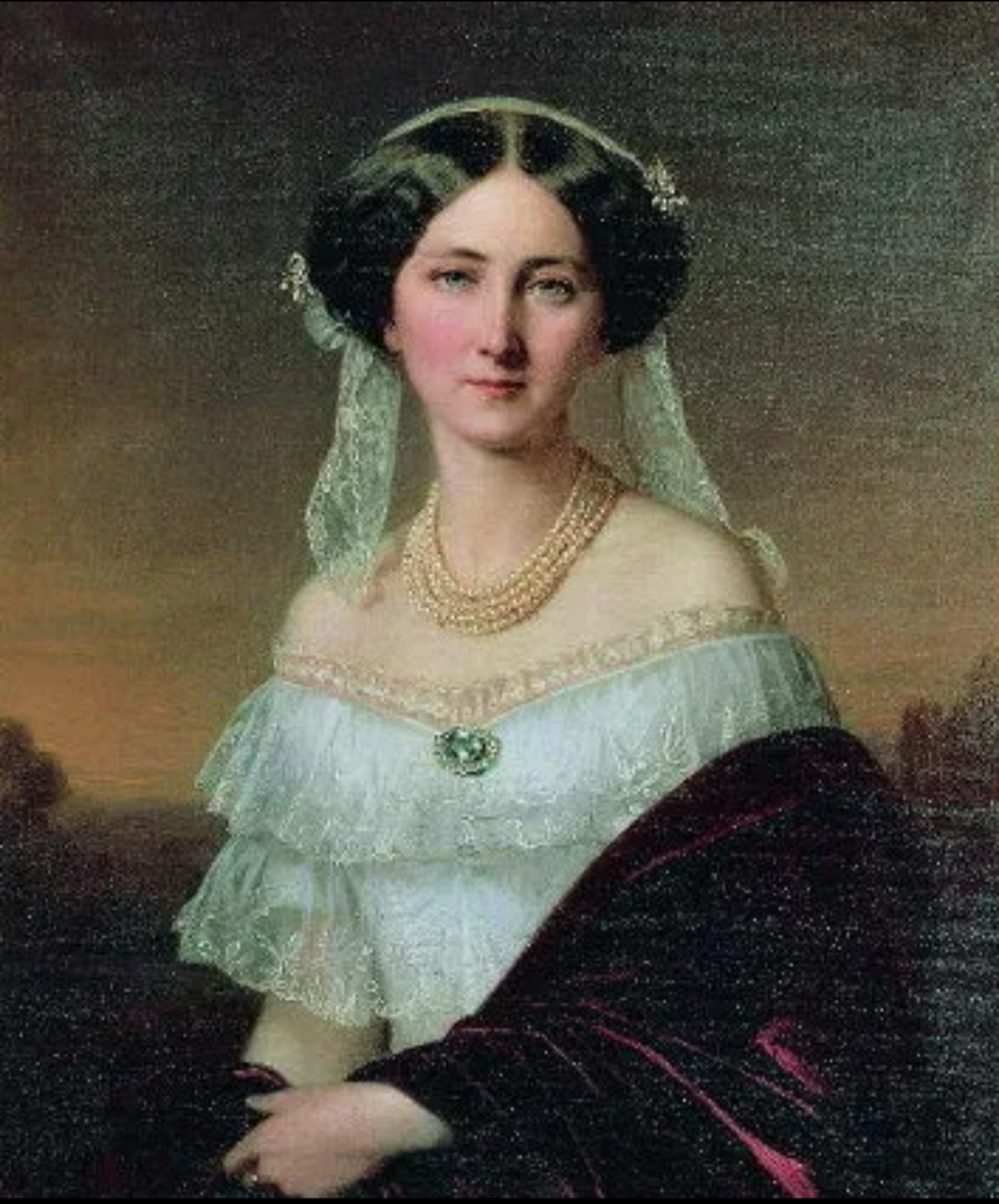
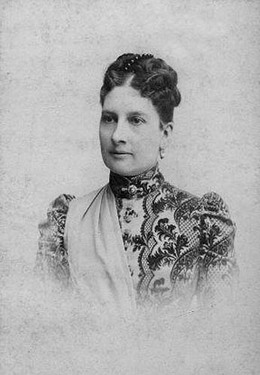
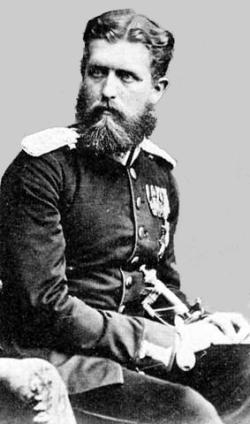
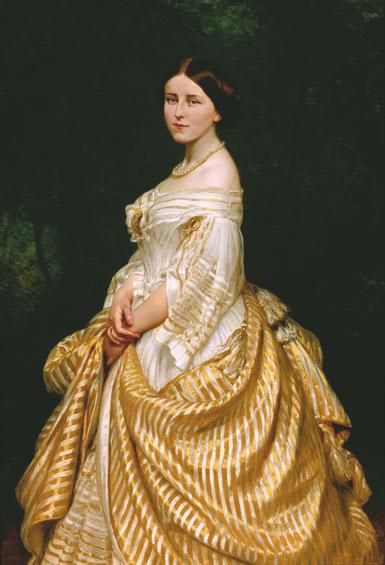
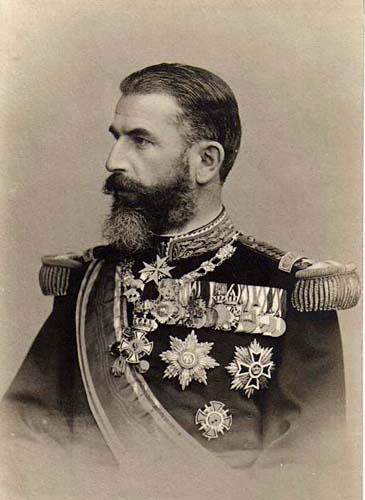
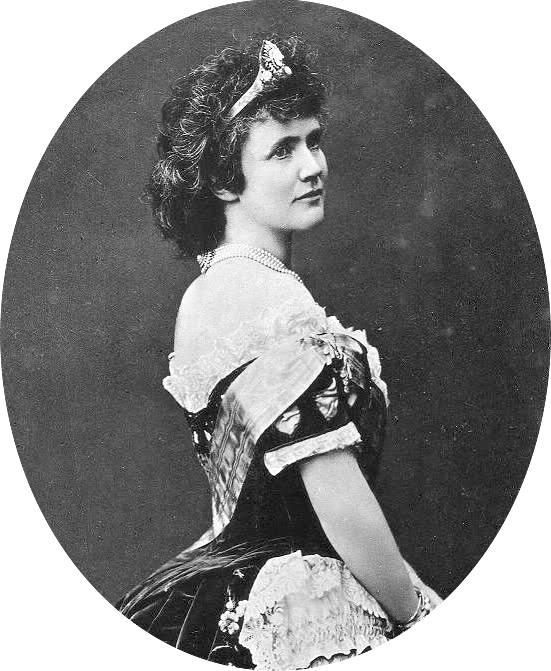
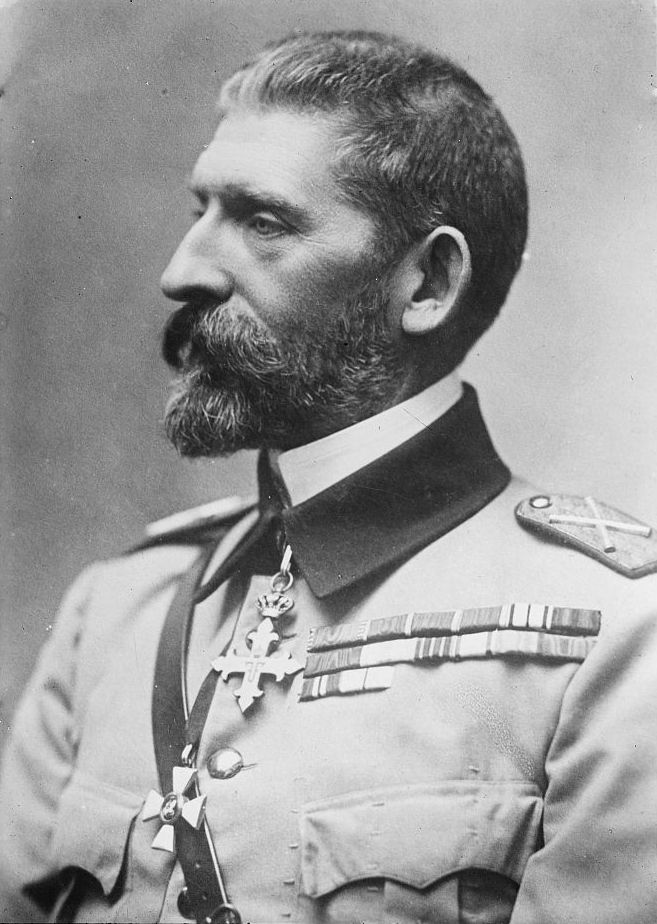
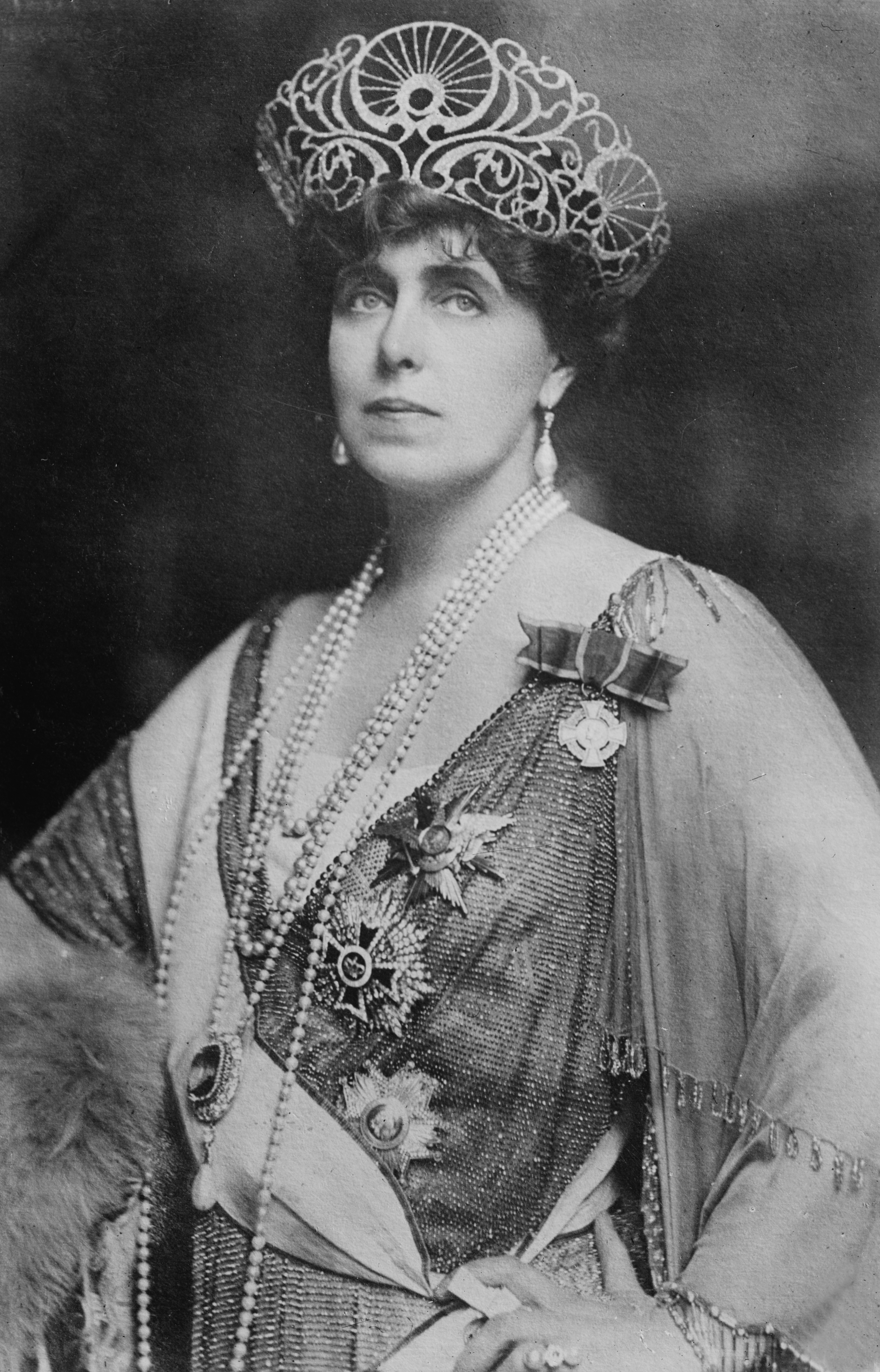
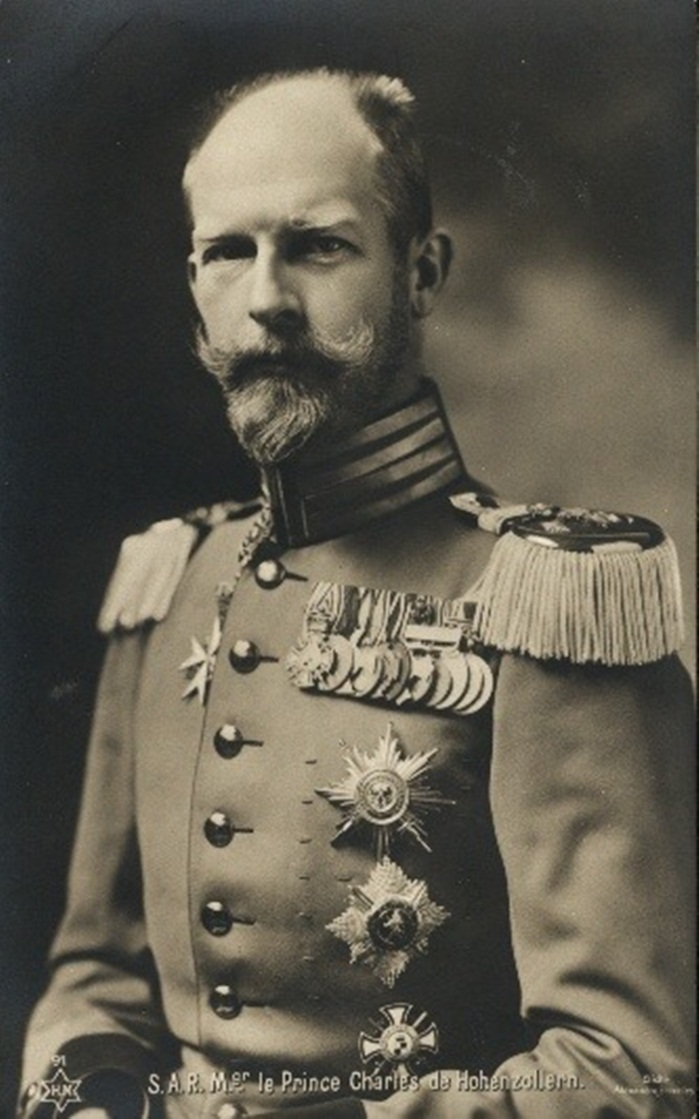
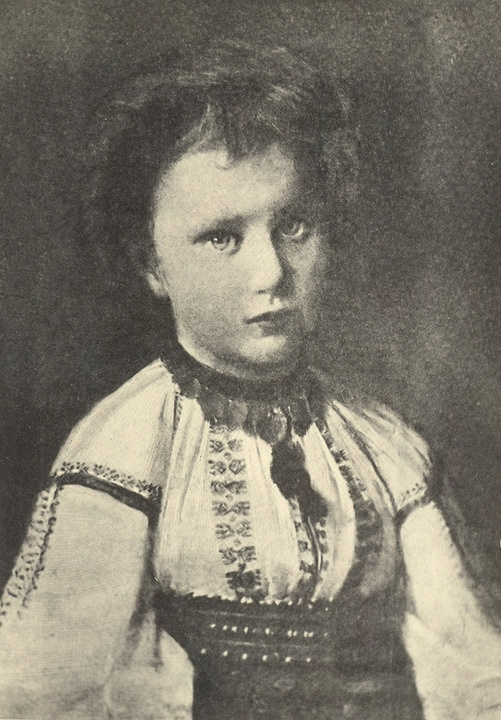
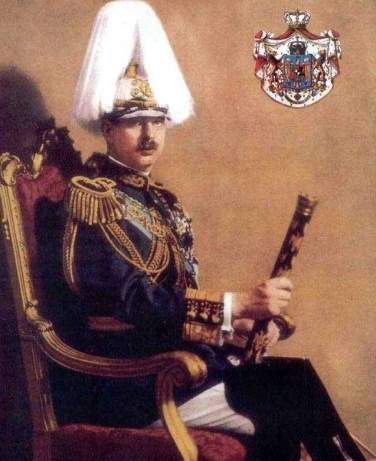
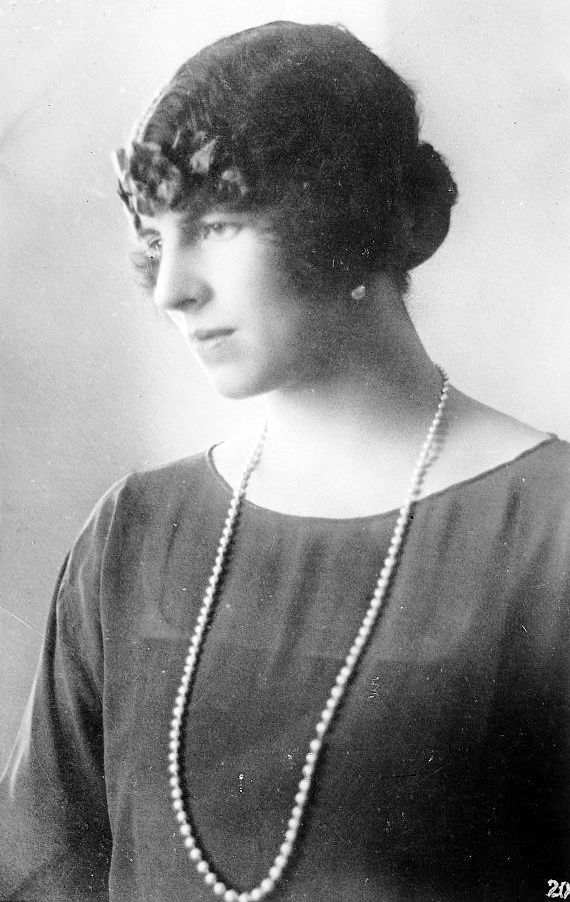
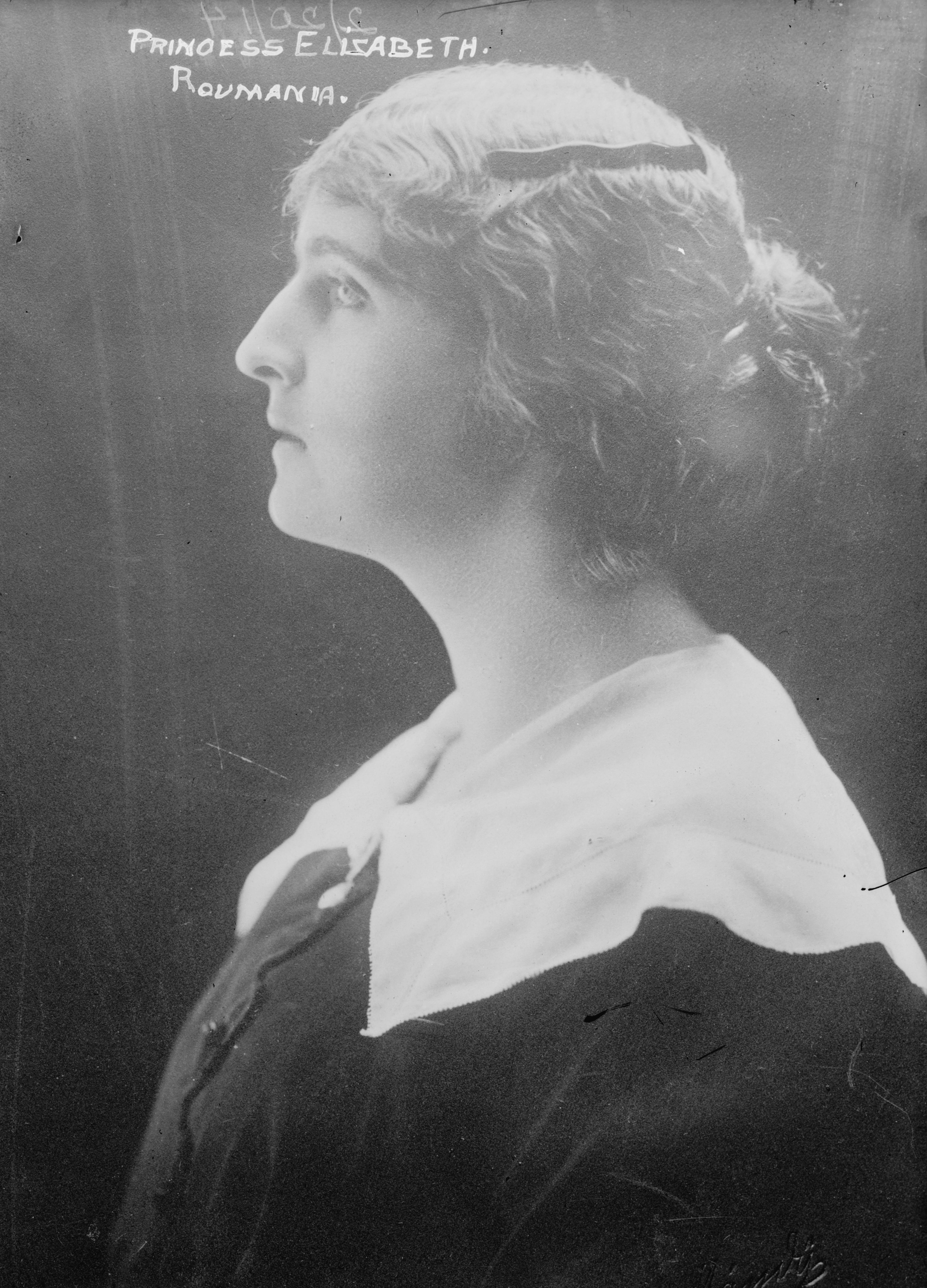
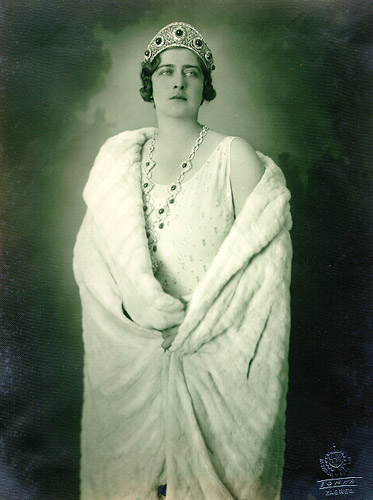
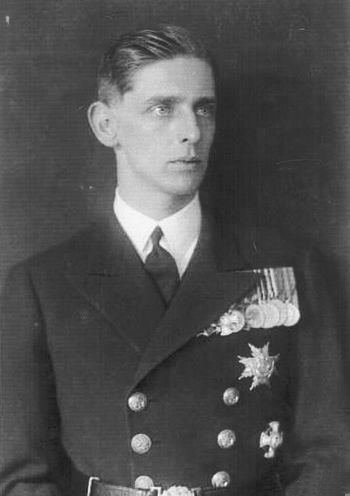
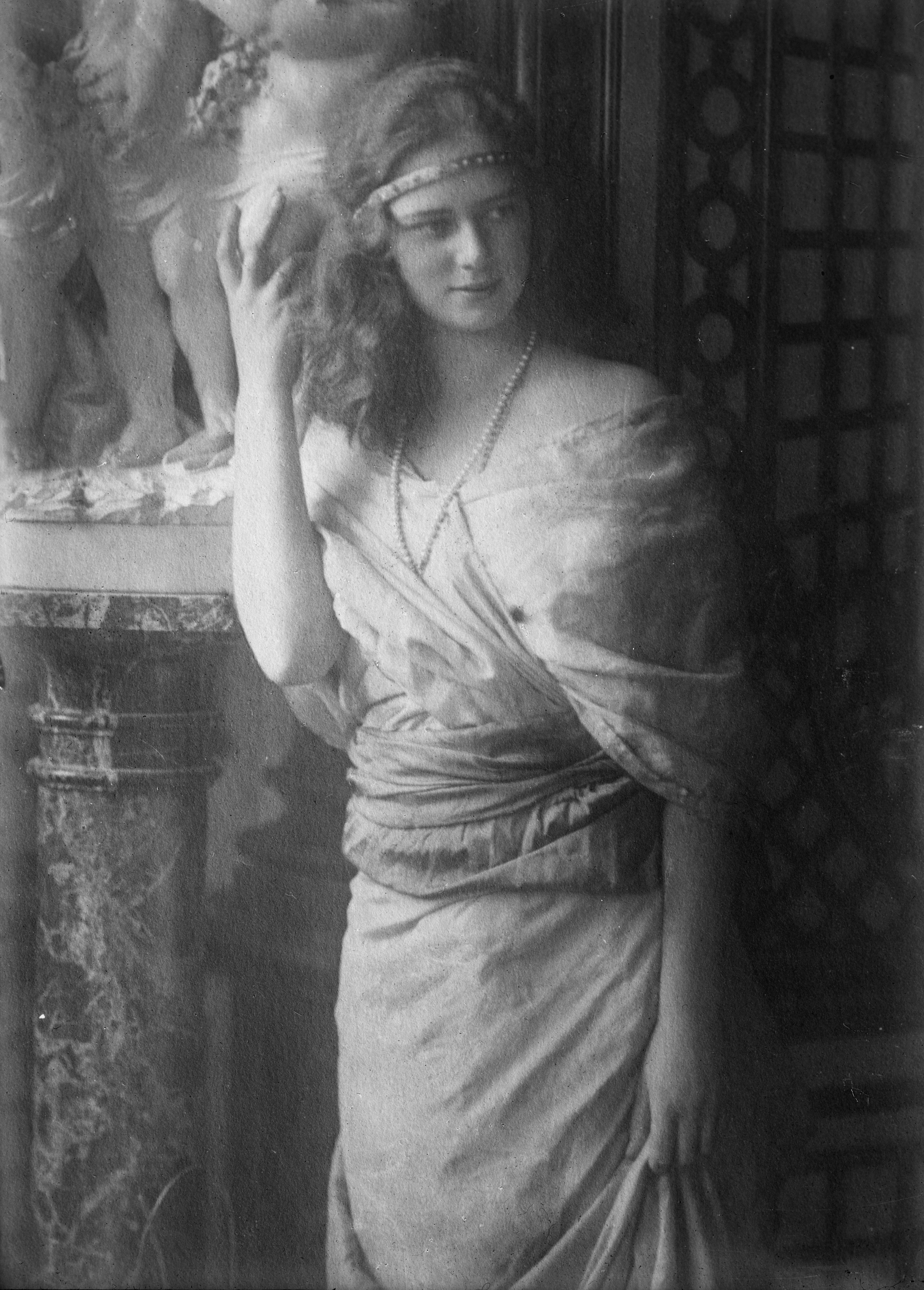
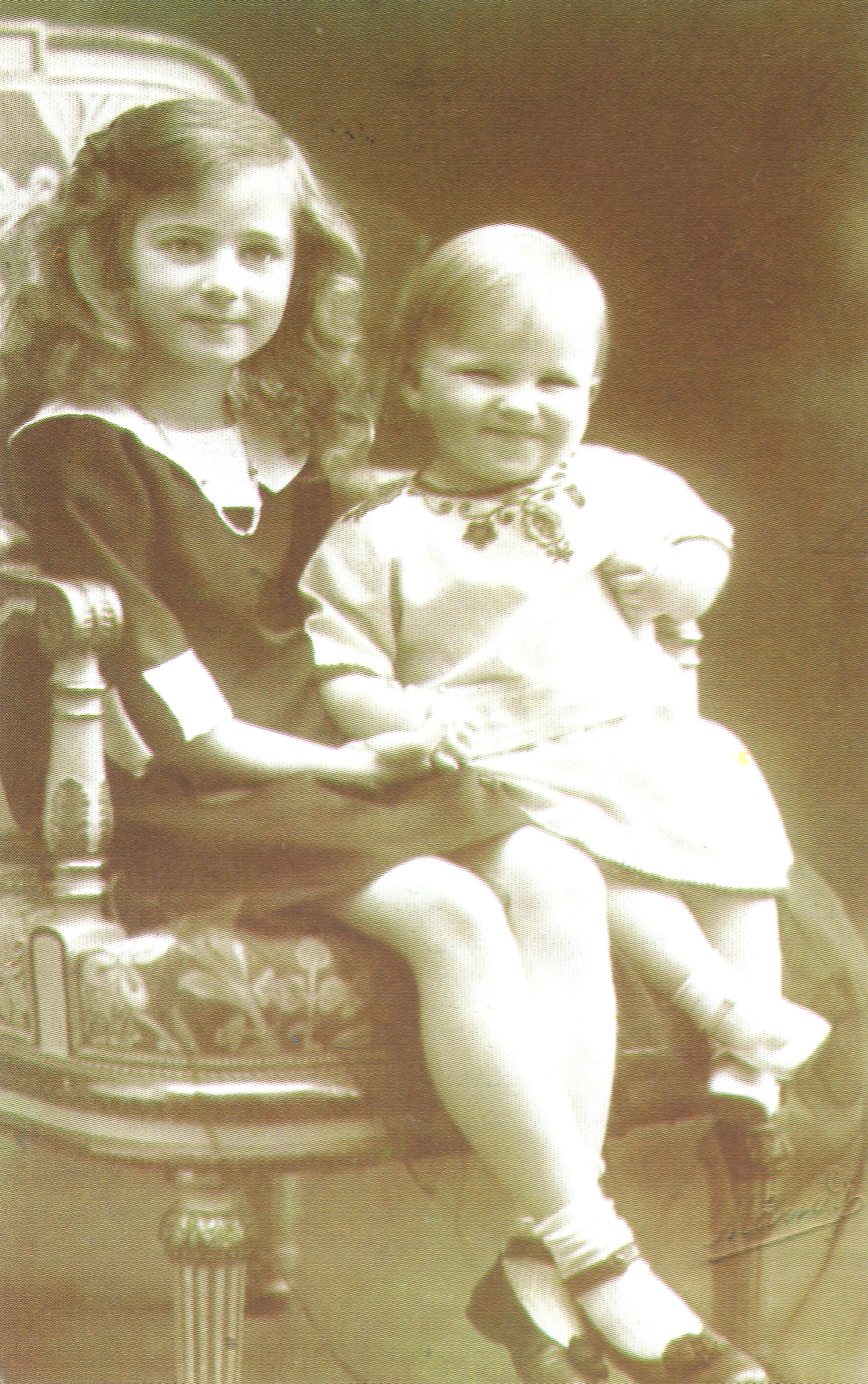
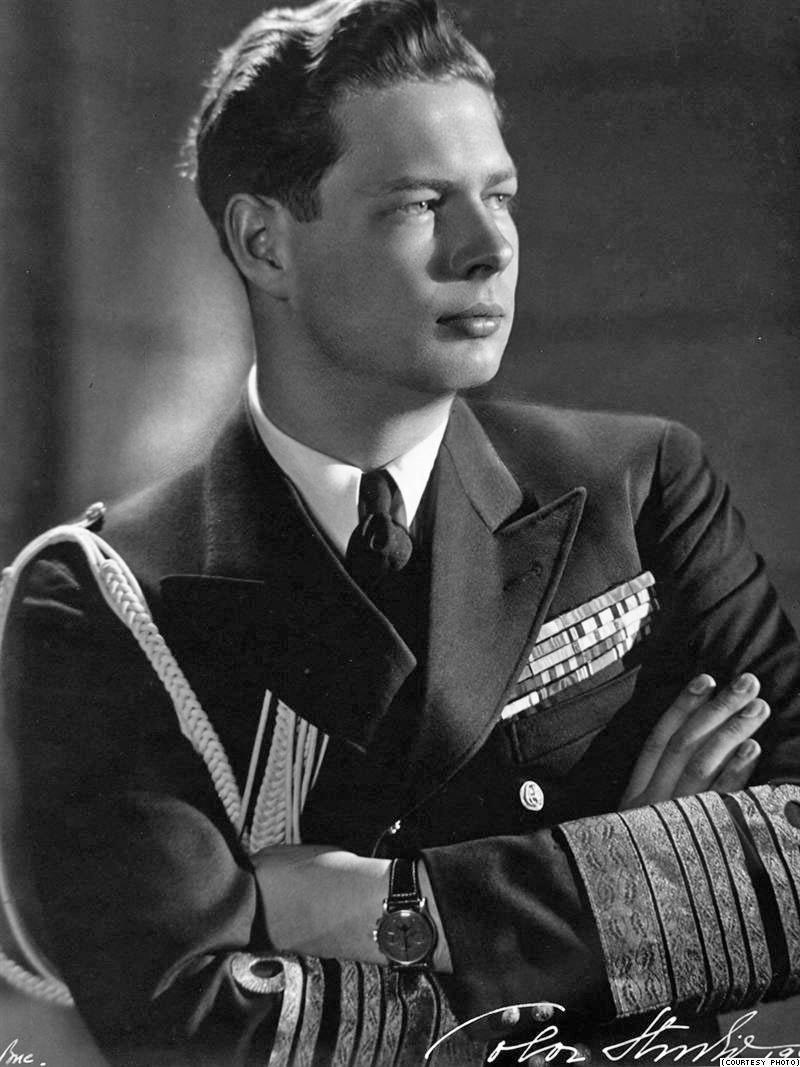
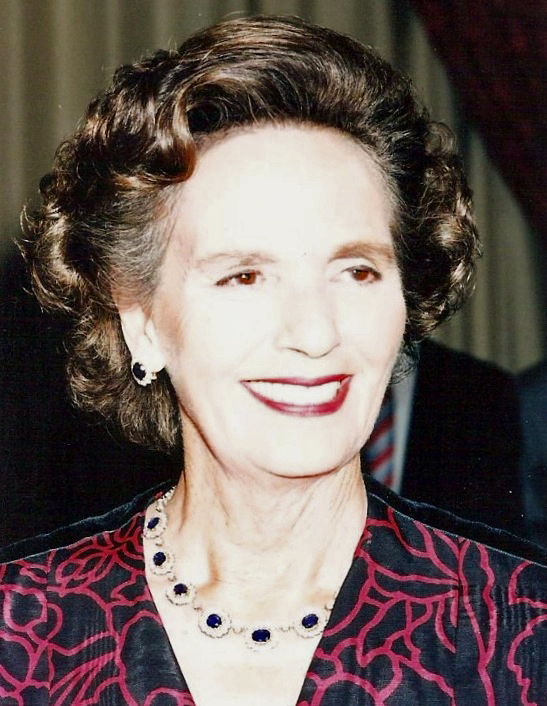
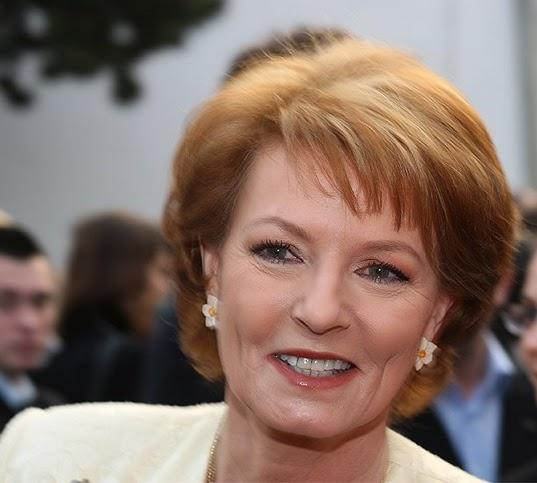
Karl Anton b.1811 – d.1885 Prince of Hohenzollern-Sigmaringen r.1848–1849 Prince of Hohenzollern r.1869–1885	Josephine of Baden b.1813 – d.1900
Antónia of Portugal b.1845 – d.1913	Leopold b.1835 – d.1905	Stephanie b.1837 – d.1859	Carol I b.1839 – d.1914 Domnitor of the United Principalities r.1866–1881 King of Romania r.1881–1914	Elisabeth of Wied b.1843 – d.1916 Queen consort of Romania; 1869–1914	Anton b.1841 – d.1866	Friedrich b.1843 – d.1904	Maria; Luise b.1845 – d.1912
William b.1864 – d.1927 Prince of Hohenzollern r.1905–1927	Ferdinand I b.1865 – d.1927 King of Romania; 1914–1927	Marie of Edinburgh b.1875 – d.1938 Queen consort of Romania; 1914–1927	Karl Anton b.1868 – d.1919	Maria b.1870 – d.1874
Zizi Lambrino b.1898 – d.1953	Carol II b.1893 – d.1953 King of Romania; 1930–1940	Helen of Greece b.1896 – d.1982 Queen Mother of Romania; 1928–1982	Magda Lupescu b.1895 – d.1977	Elisabeth b.1894 – d.1956 Queen consort of Greece; 1922–1924	Maria b.1900 – d.1961 Queen consort of Yugoslavia; 1922–1934	Nicholas b.1903 – d.1978 Member of the Regency; 1927–1930	Ileana b.1909 – d.1991 Archduchess Anton of Austria 1931–1954; Mrs Stefan Issarescu 1956–1965; Mother Alexandra 1967–1991	Mircea b.1913 – d.1916
Carol Lambrino b.1920 – d.2006	Michael I b.1921 – d.2017 King of Romania; 1927–1930; 1940–1947	Anne of Bourbon-Parma b.1923 – d.2016
Paul b.1948	Alexander b.1961	Margareta b.1949 Custodian of the Crown of Romania; 2017–present	Elena b.1950	Irina b.1953	Sofia b.1957	Maria b.1964
Carol; Ferdinand	Nicholas b.1985	Elisabeta-Karina b.1989	Michael b.1985	Angelica-Margareta b.1986	Eelaz b.1999
Augustus-Mihai b.2024	Kohen b.2012	Courtney b.2007	Diana b.2011

== See also ==
- Decorations of the Romanian Royal House
- Hohenzollern-Sigmaringen
- Monarchism in Romania
