= King of Romania =

Title of the Romanian monarch from 1881 until 1947

- Royal Coat of arms since 1922

Details
- Style: His Majesty
- First monarch: Carol I
- Last monarch: Michael I
- Formed: 15 March 1881
- Abolished: 30 December 1947
- Residence: Royal Palace
- Appointer: Hereditary
- Pretenders: Margareta, Paul-Philippe Hohenzollern

The King of Romania (Romanian: Regele României) or King of the Romanians (Romanian: Regele românilor) was the title of the monarch of the Kingdom of Romania from 1881 until 1947, when the Romanian Workers' Party proclaimed the Romanian People's Republic following Michael I's forced abdication.

== History ==
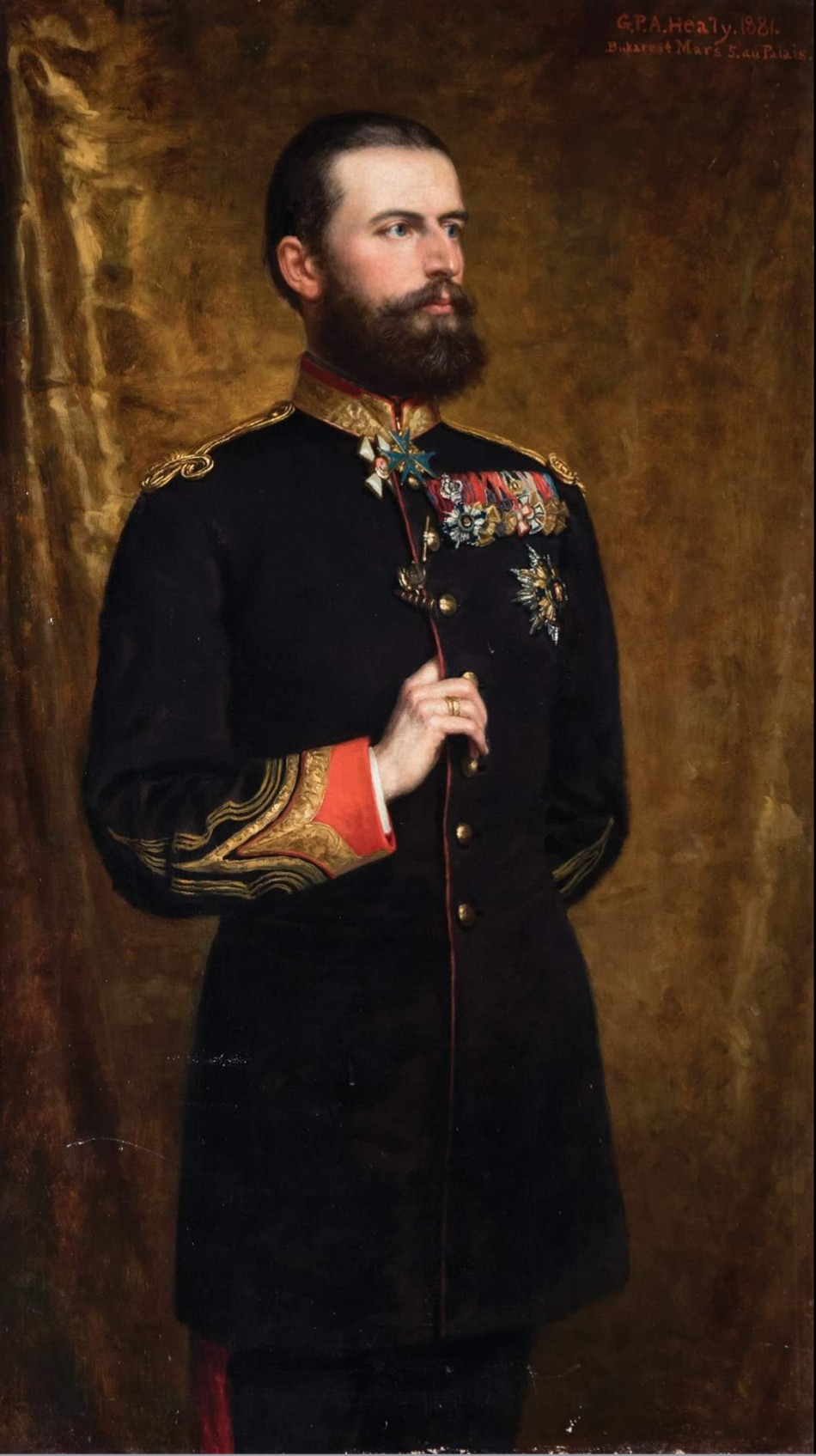
Carol I, the first King of Romania (portrait by George Healy, 1881)

The state had been internationally recognized as a principality since 1862, after the creation of the United Principalities, a personal union between Moldavia and Wallachia, at that time vassal states of the Ottoman Empire. Alexander I became domnitor (ruling prince) after the official unification of the two formerly separate states, being elected prince of both states in 1859. He was deposed in 1866 by a broad coalition of the main political parties, after which parliament offered the throne to Prince Karl of Hohenzollern-Sigmaringen who subsequently became the new "Domnitor of Romania" (as Carol I).

Romania's independence from the Ottoman Empire was recognized in 1878 by the Treaty of Berlin. In an expression of full sovereignty, the principality was elevated to a kingdom in 1881, with Carol I becoming King of Romania. Carol I died in 1914, and was succeeded by his nephew, Ferdinand I.

In 1927, Ferdinand I died, and the country was left in the care of a regency headed by Prince Nicholas of Romania, during the reign of Ferdinand's young grandson, Michael I (who was only six years old at the time), his father (Carol II) having renounced his rights to the throne in 1925. Carol II, unlike Carol I, in the beginning had no desire to rule Romania, and was frequently out of the country exploring the rest of Europe with his mistress. Michael's first reign would be short lived at only three years, until his father Carol II came back to contest the title at the behest of a dissatisfied political faction that staged a sudden 'coup d'état' (in spite of the fact that only a few years earlier he had renounced in official documents, written and signed in front of his own father, all his future claims to the throne of Romania).

After a ten-year rule, Carol II was forced to give up his crown in the wake of an outcry over the Second Vienna Award, which forced Romania to surrender northern Transylvania to Hungary. After the war, he married his longtime mistress, Elena Lupescu. The couple ultimately settled in Portugal, and the "playboy king" never returned to Romania.

The kingdom of Romania was a constitutional monarchy for most of its existence with the exception of 1938–1944, during the dictatorships of Carol II (1938–1940) and Ion Antonescu (1940–1944). On 23 August 1944, Michael I restored the last democratic royal Constitution of 1923. However, during his second reign (1940–1947), Michael I reigned mostly as an extraconstitutional king, without a parliamentary vote. Parliament was initially suspended and reinstated only later, in 1946. Michael I was crowned and anointed by the Orthodox Patriarch, Nicodim Munteanu, in the Patriarchal Cathedral of Bucharest, on the day of his second accession, 6 September 1940. However, legally, Michael I could not exercise much authority besides some prerogatives such as being the Supreme Head of the Army and designating a plenipotentiary prime minister Conducător ("Leader").

On 23 August 1944, with the Soviet Army already deep inside Romania's territory, Michael I deposed the German-allied dictator Ion Antonescu at the urging of the opposition parties and aligned the country with the Allies. Helped by the presence of Soviet forces, communists gradually took control of the administration. On 30 December 1947, King Michael I was forced to sign his abdication. The same day, Parliament proclaimed the country a people's republic. The young former king and former queen mother Elena were forced to leave Romania on January 3, 1948, in the royal train, at the request of the communist-dominated government. Royal properties were nationalized later that year.

== Return from exile ==
After the Revolution of 1989, the former king visited Romania to an enthusiastic reception in the streets of Bucharest; the royal estates and properties in Romania were restored. However, the country preserved its republican character.

The former king was respected and recognized by the Parliament. His grandson regularly visits different organisations in Romania. Princess Margareta and her husband bestow royal orders in the name of the former king for selected Romanians.

The royal house is still popular and in 2014 Prime Minister Victor Ponta promised a referendum on whether or not to reinstate the monarchy if he were re-elected. A square was named in honour of the ex-king in 2012. Following the death of the former king in 2017, and the largely positive reaction of the crowds to the royal family at his funeral, Romanian politicians have discussed whether to hold a referendum to restore the monarchy, with around half the population (in early 2018) believing monarchy to be a better organisational form than a republic.

== Kings of Romania (1881–1947) ==
Name	Lifespan	Reign start	Reign end	Notes	Family	Image
Carol I	20 April 1839 – 10 October 1914 (aged 75)	15 March 1881	10 October 1914	Prince Karl of Hohenzollern-Sigmaringen, elected Sovereign Prince of Romania 20 April 1866, proclaimed King in 1881	Hohenzollern-Sigmaringen	Carol I of Romania
Ferdinand I	24 August 1865 – 20 July 1927 (aged 61)	10 October 1914	20 July 1927	Nephew of Carol I	Hohenzollern-Sigmaringen	Ferdinand I of Romania
Michael I (1st reign)	25 October 1921 – 5 December 2017 (aged 96)	20 July 1927	8 June 1930	Grandson of Ferdinand I	Hohenzollern-Sigmaringen	Michael I of Romania
Carol II	15 October 1893 – 4 April 1953 (aged 59)	8 June 1930	6 September 1940	Son of Ferdinand I	Hohenzollern-Sigmaringen	Carol II of Romania
Michael I (2nd reign)	25 October 1921 – 5 December 2017 (aged 96)	6 September 1940	30 December 1947	Son of Carol II; Restored	Hohenzollern-Sigmaringen	Michael I of Romania

== Queen consorts of Romania ==
Name	Lifespan	Reign start	Reign end	Notes	Family	Image
Elisabeth	29 December 1843 – 2 March 1916 (aged 72)	15 March 1881	10 October 1914	Consort of King Carol I	Wied	Elisabeta of Romania
Marie	29 October 1875 – 18 July 1938 (aged 62)	10 October 1914	20 July 1927	Consort of King Ferdinand I	Saxe-Coburg and Gotha	Maria of Romania

=== Timeline ===
This is a graphical lifespan timeline of Kings, Heirs and Claimants to the Romanian throne. The kings, the heirs and the claimants are listed in chronological order.

== Royal Standards ==
Royal Standard (1881–1922)

Royal Standard (1922–1947)

== See also ==
- Domnitor
- List of Romanian royal consorts
- List of rulers of Moldavia
- List of rulers of Wallachia
- List of heads of state of Romania
- Regalia of Romania
  - Steel Crown of Romania
