= Margareta of Romania =

Custodian of the Crown of Romania since 2017

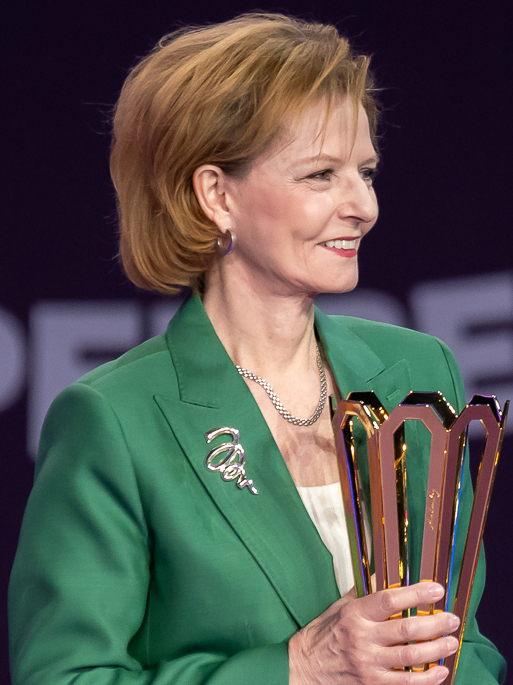
- Margareta in 2024

Head of the House of Romania (disputed)
- Tenure: 5 December 2017 – present
- Predecessor: Michael I
- Heir presumptive: Princess Elena
- Born: 26 March 1949 (age 77); Lausanne, Switzerland
- Spouse: Radu Duda (m. 1996)
- House: Romania (since 2011); Hohenzollern-Sigmaringen (until 2011)
- Father: Michael I of Romania
- Mother: Anne of Bourbon-Parma

Margareta, Custodian of the Romanian Crown (Romanian: Custode al Coroanei române; born 26 March 1949) is the eldest daughter of King Michael I and Queen Anne of Romania. She assumed her father's duties in March 2016, upon his retirement, and has claimed the headship of the House of Romania since his death on 5 December 2017. She also heads the Margareta of Romania Royal Foundation.

Until 2011, Margareta also used the style of a princess of Hohenzollern. Margareta has four sisters and no brothers or children. Her heir presumptive is her next sister, Princess Elena of Romania.

Under the defunct royal constitutions of 1923 and 1938 which followed agnatic primogeniture, Margareta and her sisters would not have been in the line of succession to the throne. On 30 December 2007, King Michael designated Margareta as heir presumptive to the defunct throne by an act that is not recognized by the Romanian government and lacks legal validity without approval by Romania's Parliament. On the same occasion, Michael also requested that, should the Romanian Parliament consider restoring the monarchy, the Salic law of succession not be reinstated, allowing female succession. According to the new statute of the Romanian Royal House as declared by Michael, no illegitimate descendants or collateral lines may claim dynastic privileges, titles or rank and any such are excluded from the Royal House of Romania and from the line of succession to the throne.

== Early life ==
=== Birth ===
Margareta was born on 26 March 1949 at Clinique de Montchoisi in Lausanne, Switzerland, as the first of King Michael I and Queen Anne's five daughters. She was baptised in the Romanian Orthodox Church; her godfather was Prince Philip, Duke of Edinburgh. Her godmother was her maternal grandmother Princess Margaret of Denmark who was also her namesake. She was followed by four sisters: Princess Elena (born 1950), Princess Irina (born 1953), Princess Sofia (born 1957) and Princess Maria (born 1964).

=== Childhood ===
Margareta spent her childhood at family homes in Lausanne and at Ayot House, St Lawrence, in Hertfordshire, England. During holidays she and her sisters spent time with their grandparents; paternally with Helen, Queen Mother, at Villa Sparta in Italy and maternally, with Princess Margaret and her husband Prince René of Bourbon-Parma in Copenhagen. She and her sisters were told "fascinating tales of a homeland they couldn't visit" by their father. She also spent time with relatives in Greece, Italy, Denmark, Luxembourg and Spain.

Margareta met Queen Elizabeth II of the United Kingdom for the first time in the summer of 1952 at Balmoral Castle, when she was three years old. In her childhood, she spent holidays with Prince Charles and his sister, Princess Anne, who were close to Margareta, as well as Prince Amedeo, Duke of Aosta (her cousin), and the Greek, Danish and Luxembourg royal families.

Queen Helen's interest in horses influenced Margareta to become an equestrian.

In 1964, along with five other princesses, Margareta was a bridesmaid at the wedding of Princess Anne-Marie of Denmark to King Constantine II of Greece.

== Education ==
=== Early education ===
In 1956, Margareta lived with Queen Helen for six months at her villa in Florence, attending kindergarten until returning to Switzerland, where she attended a primary school, with Princess Sofia, from age six to nine.

=== Secondary education ===
In 1960, she was sent to a boarding school in Old Basing, Hampshire, where she stayed until she was 13; she found it difficult to be away from home but was glad that she became more mature, noting that her English improved later.

Her favourite subjects were: art, riding and natural sciences (she learned how to grow plants) and also piano lessons.

In 1964, she began secondary education at a French school in Switzerland, where she studied philosophy.

"I did my baccalaureate in Switzerland, got my driving licence the next day and I left very fast. I really didn't enjoy the baccalaureate, I didn't enjoy school, I didn't enjoy Switzerland" Margareta said in an interview in 2007.

After her Swiss-French baccalaureate, rather than heading straight for Paris and studying at the École des Beaux-Arts, her preferred destination, she was persuaded to return to Florence to spend a year with her Romanian grandmother, whom she described as "my spiritual guide, my mentor, guiding star. She taught me a lot about life, opened my eyes to all that is beautiful and good in the world". Her dreams of art school were soon replaced by a determination to go to university.

=== Further education ===
Margareta studied sociology, political science and public international law at the University of Edinburgh in Scotland, graduating in 1974. Known there as "Margareta de Roumanie", for the first few weeks she felt a depressing "sense of foreignness" but later became active in campus politics, becoming a member of the students' representative council.

During an interview from 2011, she confessed that her first desire was studying philosophy: "I really enjoyed philosophy, but I realized I had to be a bit more practical. Then, in the 1970s, sociology was fashionable, so I chose it alongside the international law I wanted for the United Nations, and the political sciences because they could relate to international relations and give the opportunity to know systems. This combination of studies was very interesting. Maybe now, if I had to resume, I would do something more practical."

While at the university during her twenties, Margareta was involved in a five-year romantic relationship with Gordon Brown, who would serve as Prime Minister of the United Kingdom from 2007 to 2010; in 2007, she was interviewed by an editor of The Daily Telegraph: "It was a very solid and romantic story; I never stopped loving him, but one day it didn't seem right any more, it was politics, politics, politics, and I needed nurturing," she said.

== Career ==
After her graduation in 1974, she worked in a number of British universities for a few years, specialising in medical sociology and public health policy. Later she participated in an international research program coordinated by the World Health Organization that focused on developing health policy recommendations and preventive pilot projects.

In 1979, she then worked for the agencies of the United Nations: The World Health Organization and The United Nations Population Fund, where she joined Social projects in public health, based in Africa and Latin America where she came into contact with suffering and deficiencies of the disadvantaged which was the kick start of her experience of the beginning of a road in humanitarian service, which she has still followed since then.

In 1983, she moved to Rome and joined the Food and Agriculture Organization of the United Nations where, as a member of the World Food Day project team, she worked for three years on the public awareness campaign concerning agricultural programs, nutrition, and poverty alleviation. She belonged to the International Fund for Agricultural Development team until 1986.

In 1986, she joined the International Fund for Agricultural Development where she handled relations with nongovernmental organizations and assisted in raising funds for IFAD programs.

In the summer of 1989 Margareta resigned from her job as civil unrest started in Romania. Concluding that fundamental change was about to occur in Eastern Europe, she moved to Geneva to work with the Romanian Crown Council and the royal family, whose members began preparing themselves for what was to come.

== Romania ==
=== Romanian revolution ===
In mid 1989, civil and governmental unrest started arising in the Eastern Bloc as the loosening of control of Eastern Europe by the Soviet Union had triggered most of the impact for the former states which started a Revolutionary wave leading to the Revolutions of 1989.

In early December 1989, there was civil unrest by the anti-government protesters and on 16 December the 12-day Romanian Revolution started; on the commands of President Nicolae Ceaușescu, troops fired on the protesters, however on the 22nd the army switched from supporting him to backing the protesting population. On 25 December, Ceaușescu and his wife Deputy Prime Minister Elena Ceaușescu were deposed, captured and executed by orders from a Drumhead military tribunal; 42 years of the Socialist Republic of Romania had ended. The revolution was the first overthrow of the ruling governmental system since King Michael's coup which he successfully staged in 1944 by arresting members of the military government which supported Nazi Germany.

During the Revolution, all members of the Royal Family took a part to console the situation outside of Romania.

=== Arrival in Romania ===
While she was visiting one orphanage, a child in a filthy cot died in front of her. It spurred her to establish the Princess Margareta of Romania Foundation in 1990. The foundation has raised more than five million euros, through which it contributes to the development of Romanian civil society.

A 25th anniversary celebration of Margareta's return to Romania was held at the Romanian Athenaeum, followed by a dinner at the CEC Palace with Romania's Prime Minister Victor Ponta and Senate President Călin Popescu-Tăriceanu; around 200 other prominent guests participated in the festivities. Margareta also hosted a March 2015 gala at the dynasty's historical family seat, Peleș Castle, in honour of the Romanian Rugby Union, attended by Klaus Johannis, the first incumbent Romanian president to pay an official visit to the former royal family.

=== Romanian Red Cross ===
On 15 May 2015, the General Assembly of the Romanian Red Cross elected Margareta as President of the Romanian Red Cross. The Red Cross was instituted as a Romanian branch of the International Red Cross in 1876, under the reign of her great-great-granduncle King Carol I of Romania. In her acceptance statement, she expressed her gratitude to the Romanian Red Cross representatives, who re-established a long and valuable tradition of partnership between the oldest organization in the country and the Romanian Crown.

== Custodian of the Romanian Crown ==
=== Succession ===
Although at Margareta's birth she was not expected to inherit the defunct Romanian throne and the headship of the Romanian royal family, the birth of four younger sisters and no brother meant that without a change in the royal family's succession laws, male members of the House of Hohenzollern-Sigmaringen would succeed her father as pretenders to the Romanian throne, in accordance with the Salic law enshrined in both the defunct royal Romanian Constitution of 1923 and the defunct Statute of the Romanian royal house, dated 1884.

In 1997 King Michael designated Margareta as successor to "all prerogatives and rights" of his, indicating his desire for a gender-blind succession to the throne; although there was much consideration of altering the line of succession, no actions were taken until 30 December 2007, when King Michael I issued the statutes for the Royal House, called The Fundamental Rules of the Royal House of Romania.

Following the announcement of The Fundamental Rules, King Michael asked the Romanian Government that, should it consider restoring the monarchy, it should also abolish the Salic law of succession.

Margareta does not use the title of queen; instead she claims the title "Custodian of the Romanian Crown", with the style "Her Majesty", a title that Michael offered her.

Paul-Philippe Hohenzollern (son of King Michael's illegitimate half-brother, Carol Lambrino) denounced King Michael's actions of creating The Fundamental Rules and severing ties with the House of Hohenzollern-Sigmaringen. Paul also claims to be head of the Romanian royal family, unlike his father.

In Romanian law, dynastic rights, titles of nobility and the institution of the Royal House do not exist.

=== Foreign relations ===
Although Margareta has no official role within the politics of Romania to maintain ties with other countries, she has fostered diplomatic relationships with numerous foreign dignitaries in her capacity as a head of the House of Romania. During these visits she is often accompanied by her husband Prince Radu, who is a special Romanian government representative for Integration, Co-operation and Sustainable Development.

== Marriage ==
In 1994, Margareta met Radu Duda, a Romanian citizen and part-time actor, through the work of the Princess Margareta Foundation. He was working as an art therapist in orphanages when he was introduced to her during her tour of the foundation's programs. On 24 July 1996, she married Duda in a civil wedding at Versoix.

Radu Duda was accorded the style "Radu, Prince of Hohenzollern-Veringen" on 1 January 1999, and was subsequently styled "His Royal Highness Radu, Prince of Romania", being referred to by King Michael on 30 December 2007, as future "Prince Consort of Romania". In Margareta's company and, more often alone, he has represented the former royal family publicly on various occasions. They live in the Elisabeta Palace in Bucharest.

== Controversies ==
BAE Systems, one of the donors to the Princess Margareta of Romania Foundation, and its representatives have been involved in a corruption scandal involving purchase by the Romanian government of two decommissioned UK Royal Navy frigates (Coventry and London) refurbished by BAE, for which an alleged £7 million bribe was paid, some of which, it has also been alleged, ended up in the pockets of the Hohenzollern royal family to which Margareta belongs. The "Gardianul" newspaper, noting that both Margareta and her husband, as Special Representative of the Government, had met a number of times with the BAE Systems representatives before and after the signing of the governmental contract, inquired whether the royal family was involved in any lobbying on behalf of the company. In an official communiqué sent to the newspaper, Prince Radu denied any such lobbying activities, stating that as patron of the British-Romanian Chamber of Commerce of which BAE Systems is a member, he met with its representatives as well as those of other British companies.

== Political support ==
The main pro-monarchist party PNȚCD, currently extra-parliamentary, is ambiguous in its support for Margareta. In 2002, it rejected any role for her or her husband in a restored monarchy, while in 2003 the Cluj branch of PNȚCD officially invited her to be its electoral candidate to the Senate of the Republic in upcoming elections.

Prior to his death, King Michael had not given up the hope for the restoration of the throne: "We are trying to make people understand what Romanian monarchy was and what it can still do."

In a July 2013 survey about a potential restoration of monarchy in Romania, 19% of respondents gave Margareta as their favorite, while 29.9% supported her father. 48.1% said they did not know or did not answer. In December 2017, on the backdrop of the increased capital of trust in the Royal House of Romania, re-emerging with the death of King Michael, the executive chairman of the ruling Social Democratic Party Nicolae Bădălau said that one could organize a referendum on the transition to the monarchical ruling form, arguing that "it is not a bad thing, considering that the countries that have the monarchs are developed countries", being a project of the future. At the same time, the leader of the coalition party and the president of the Senate of Romania, Călin Popescu-Tăriceanu, reinforced this idea, claiming that he is a convinced monarchist and "constitutional monarchy has the advantage of placing the monarch over political games, case: the president, instead of being an arbitrator, prefers to be a player."

== Honours and awards ==
=== Honours ===
==== Dynastic ====
- House of Romania: Grand Master of the Order of Carol I
- House of Romania: Grand Master of the Order of the Crown
- House of Romania: Grand Master of the Family Order "Custodian of the Romanian Crown"
- (Kingdom of Portugal) Portuguese Royal Family: Dame Grand Cross of the Order of Saint Isabel

==== Ecclesiastical ====
- Order of Our Lady of Prayer (Romanian Orthodox Church)

==== Foreign ====
- Czech Republic: Recipient of the Medal of Merit of the Ministry of Defence, 2nd Class
- France: Officer of the Order of the Legion of Honour
- SMOM: Grand Cross of the Order pro Merito Melitensi
- Moldova: Recipient of the Medal of Democracy

=== Honorary titles and medals ===
==== In Romania ====
- Honorary Citizen of the Cluj County
- Honorary Citizen of Iași
- Recipient of the Gold Olympic Order of the Romanian Olympic and Sports Committee

==== Outside Romania ====
- Recipient of the Académie Française's medal
- Honorary Citizen of The Jerash Governorate
- Honorary Citizen of Scotland
- Recipient of the Jordan Red Crescent's Golden Medal
- Romanian Orthodox Diocese of Northern Europe: The North Cross
- Recipient of the Dimitrie Cantemir Medal from the Academy of Sciences of Moldova
- Recipient of the 50th Birthday Medal of King Carl XVI Gustaf of Sweden
- Recipient of the 70th Birthday Badge Medal of King Carl XVI Gustaf

Honorific eponym

- Principesa Margareta Scoala Gimnaziala

Honorary academic degrees

- Honorary degree of the University of Pitești
- Honorary degree of the Banat University of Agricultural Sciences and Veterinary Medicine
- Honorary degree of the Geneva School of Diplomacy and International Relations, a for-profit business whose lack of university accreditation has put it under the spotlight of the news media.
- Honorary degree of the Babeș-Bolyai University

== Publications ==
- The Romanian Crown at 140 years. Coroana română- la 140 de ani, 2008
- The Diamond wedding. Nunta de diamant, 2008
- Royal cookery book. Carte regală de bucate, 2010 – recenzie
- The king's music. Albumul Muzica Regelui, 2011
- The royal Christmas. Crăciunul Regal, 2013, 2014
- Săvârșin. The detail. Săvârșin. Detaliul* , 2015
- Encourage with your hand the Romanian Crown. Susţine cu a ta mână Coroana Română, 2017 - The volume includes texts about the kings and queens of Romania, as well as about the current generation of the Royal Family.

== See also ==
- Monarchism in Romania

Margareta of Romania House of Romania Born: 26 March 1949
Romanian royalty
Preceded by Michael	— TITULAR — Head of the Romanian royal family Disputed by Paul-Philippe Hohenzollern; 5 December 2017 – present	Incumbent; Heir presumptive: Princess Elena of Romania
Non-profit organization positions
Preceded by Mihaela Geoană	President of the Romanian Red Cross; 2015–present	Incumbent
