= Prince Carol of Romania =

Prince Carol of Romania may refer to the following members of the Romanian royal family:

- Carol I of Romania (1839-1914)
- Carol II of Romania (1893-1953)
- Carol Lambrino, also known as Prince Mircea Grigore Carol of Romania (1920 - 2006)
