= Monarchism in Romania =

Movement for the restoration of the Romanian monarchy

Map of Europe showing current monarchies (red) and republics (blue)

Royal Standard of Romania, 1922–1947

Romania had a monarchical form of government until its forced abolition in 1947 by occupying Soviet forces as part of the Iron Curtain. The last king of Romania, Michael I, went into exile from 1947 onwards, culminating in his eventual rehabilitation in 1990 by former Communist officials.

However, he was expelled from the country shortly thereafter by authorities, fearing his popularity might ignite another revolution.

Michael I never renounced the right to his throne, declaring shortly after his forced abdication in 1947, "The removal of the monarchy constitutes a new act of violence in the policy for the enslavement of Romania. In these conditions I do not consider myself bound in any way by this act imposed upon me."

In 1992, upon his second visit to Romania since his forced abdication, he drew a crowd of 100,000 to listen to him speak from his hotel window and crowds of over a million spilled into Bucharest. On Michael I's death, public polling drew support for a restored monarchy at an all-time high of 31%.

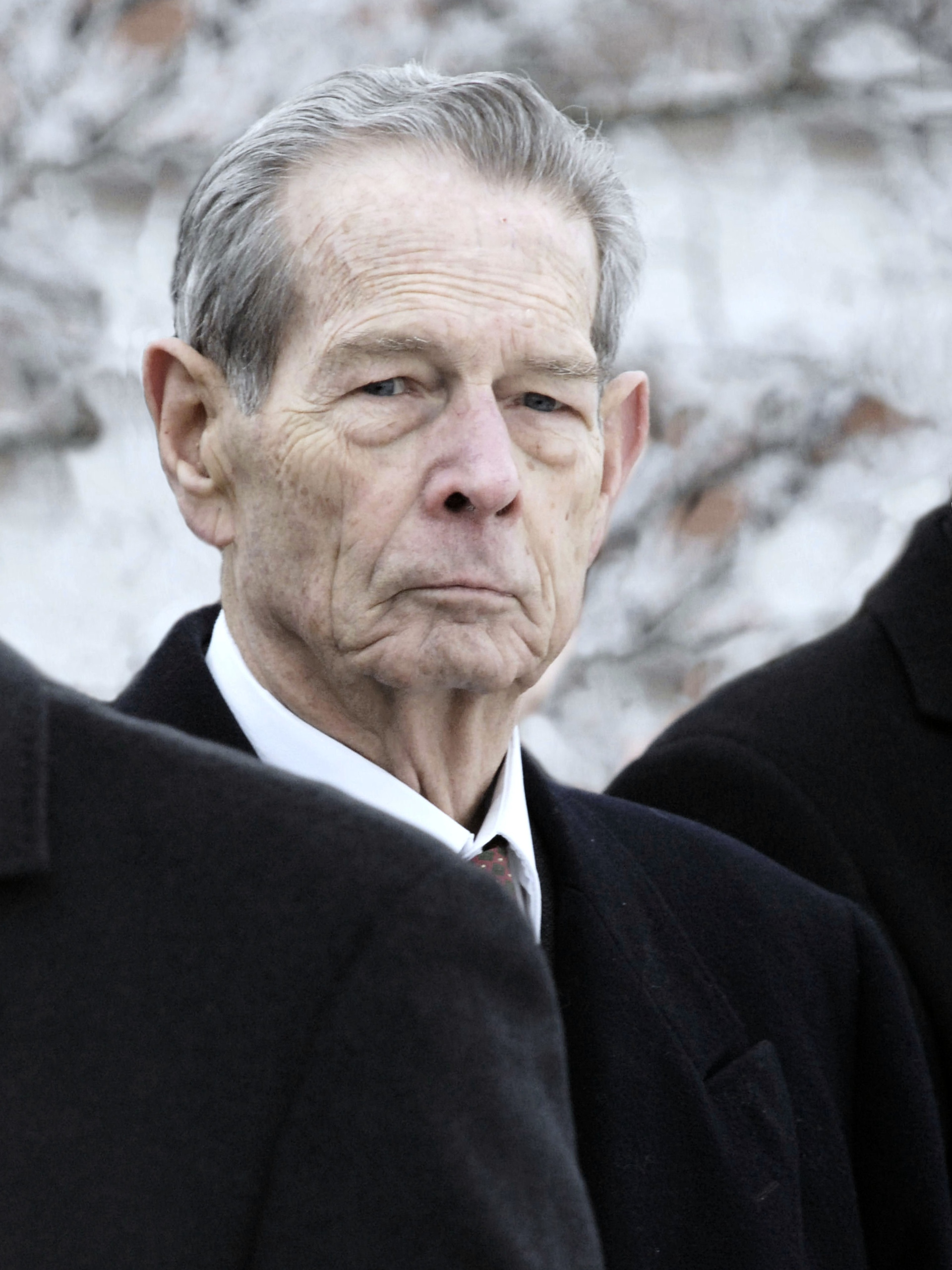
Michael I, the last King of Romania, pictured in 2007

== Calls for monarchy ==
Support for the restoration of the monarchy in Romania has also been expressed by several public figures. Niculae Bădălău, the executive president of the Social Democratic Party (PSD) at the time, declared in late 2017 that despite identifying himself as a republican, he was not opposed to a referendum on the monarchy being held in Romania, saying that the issue should be discussed as "I saw that there already are many sympathizers in media". In response to this, Prime Minister Mihai Tudose said that he could not support this initiative as he was not a monarchist. On the other hand, Călin Popescu-Tăriceanu, the leader of the Alliance of Liberals and Democrats (ALDE) at the time, talked about the possible benefits of having a monarch in Romania.

Furthermore, Cristian Diaconescu, a former Minister of Foreign Affairs, in the face of the 2021 Romanian political crisis, declared "a constitutional monarchy would have managed the crisis better, because only it can guarantee the balance of power".

== Romanian Monarchist organizations ==
Some non-governmental organizations (NGOs) actively militate for the restoration of monarchy in Romania, asking for the adoption of a new Constitution:

- Alianța Națională pentru Restaurarea Monarhiei (ANRM) - The National Alliance for the Restoration of the Monarchy
- Asociația Tineretului Regalist - The Royalist Youth Association
- Asociația „Principele Nicolae” - “Prince Nicolas” Association
- Mișcarea pentru Regat și Coroană (MRC) - The Movement for the Kingdom and the Crown

== Public support ==
The idea of the restoration of the monarchy in Romania is a popular idea that has been supported by a faction of the population ever since the Romanian Revolution. In 1997, only 7% of Romanians supported this idea, this number increased to 10% in 2002, to 14% in 2007, to 16% in 2008, to 27.2% in 2013 and to 30.2% in 2014. A 2016 poll showed a decrease of support to 21%. Shortly after Michael I's death, a 2018 poll showed that 37% were in favor of organizing a referendum on the monarchy.

== See also ==
- Kingdom of Romania
- Nihil sine Deo
- Romanian royal family
