= Romanian Red Cross =

Humanitarian non-governmental organization in Romania

Romanian Red Cross – RRC Societatea Națională de Cruce Roșie din România – SNCRR
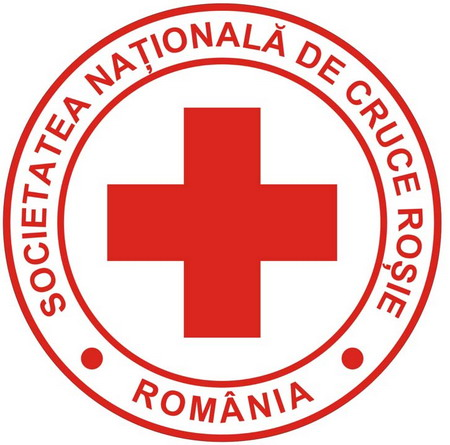
- Formation: July 4, 1876
- Legal status: Active International nongovernmental organization
- Headquarters: Bucharest, Romania
- Region served: Romania
- President: Camelia Sucu
- Royal Patron: Her Majesty Margareta, Custodian of the Crown of Romania
- Website: crucearosie.ro

The Romanian Red Cross (Crucea Roșie Română, CRR), also known as the National Society of Red Cross from Romania (Societatea Națională de Cruce Roșie din România), is a volunteer-led, humanitarian organization that provides emergency assistance, disaster relief, and education inside Romania. It is the designated national affiliate of the International Federation of Red Cross and Red Crescent Societies.

== History of the RNRC ==
=== Establishment and early history ===
Romania became a signatory to the First Geneva Convention of 1864 and ratified it in 1874. Two years later, on July 4, 1876, the Romanian Red Cross Society was founded in Romania and began work in the present headquarters of the Colțea Hospital in Bucharest.

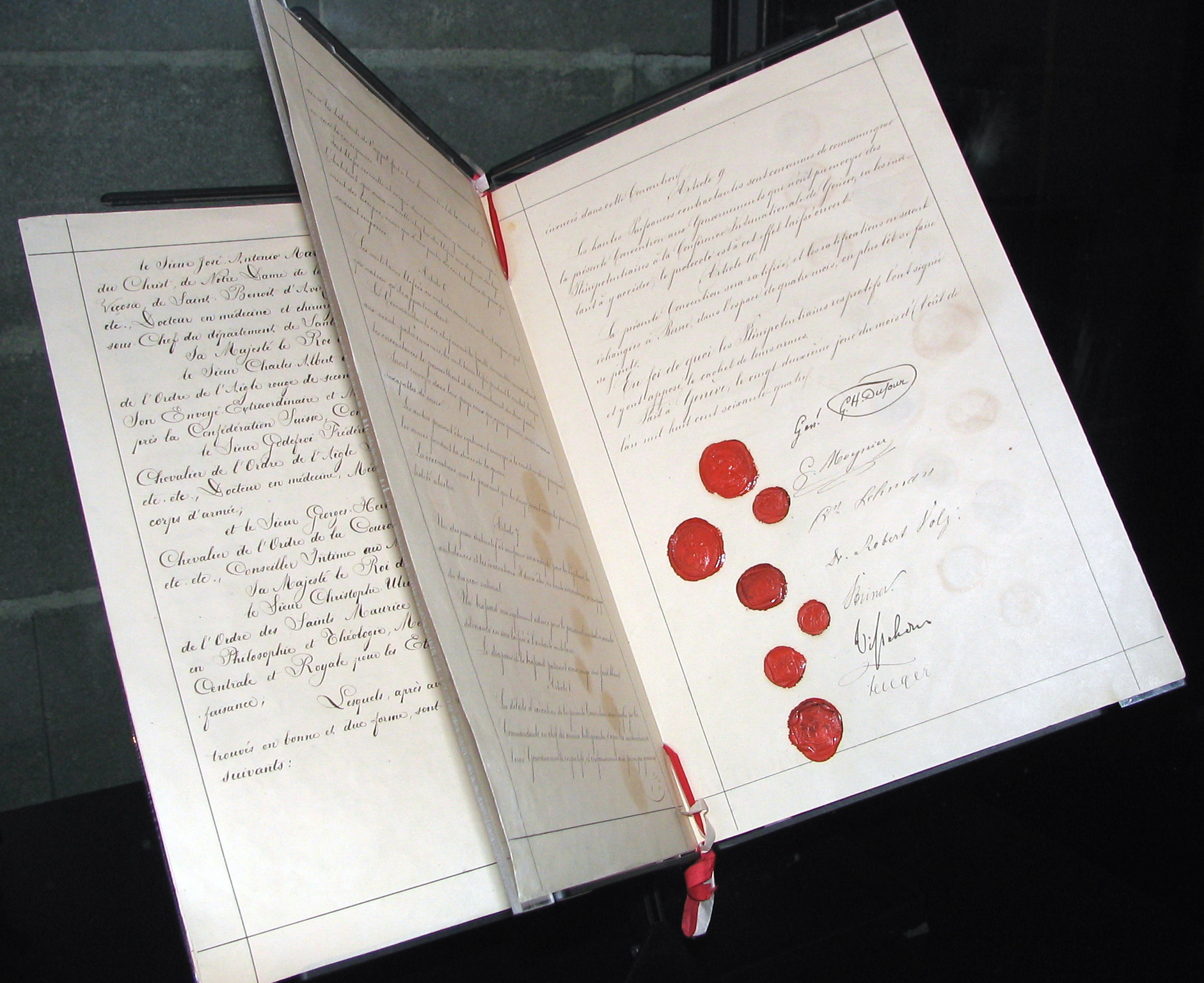
The First Geneva Convention, 1864

Some of the people who signed the founding document of the Romanian Red Cross include Nicolae Cretzulescu, George Gr. Cantacuzino, C.A. Rosetti, Ion Ghica, Dimitrie Sturza, Gr. G. Cantacuzino and Dr. Carol Davila.

The first president of the Romanian Red Cross was Prince Dimitrie Ghica, who served between 1876 and 1897.

On July 20, 1876, less than three weeks after it was established, the first Romanian Red Cross ambulance went on a humanitarian mission on the Serbian-Turkish front, south of the Danube. This mission provided medical help to wounded soldiers on both sides of the conflict, regardless of nationality.

=== Romanian War of Independence and First Balkan War ===
During the War of Independence of 1877–1878, the Romanian Red Cross provided medical personnel, ambulances, and sanitary trains in supporting the campaign. In addition to the hospital founded in Bucharest, medical settlements were founded in different cities across the country. Red Cross Societies from Germany, Italy, Belgium, Sweden and France sent material aid and medical personnel. On the front near Rahova, the Red Cross volunteers worked to prevent the spread of typhoid fever.

During the First Balkan War, the Romanian Red Cross proposed to the governments of two countries –Bulgaria and Serbia – to accept an ambulance to carry the wounded. After receiving the agreement, two Romanian Red Cross ambulances left the country and provided medical assistance to a total of 625 wounded and sick. Romanian sanitary formations deployed in Serbia consisted of three hospitals with a total of 110 beds. Material effort of the Romanian Red Cross amounted to 40,000 lei at the time.

Between 1888 and 1892, the Romanian Red Cross expanded its activities by organizing special courses to prepare nurses. In 1891, a permanent school for nurses was established, with a teaching hospital founded a year later. During this brief period of peace, the Romanian Red Cross prepared both supplies and personnel to be able to act effectively in case of necessity.

=== Second Balkan War, cholera epidemics in Romania ===
In 1913, during the second Balkan War, the Romanian Red Cross mobile hospital staff provided assistance to soldiers suffering from a cholera outbreak in Bulgarian territory.

With the return of troops in the country, cholera spread in Romania, affecting a large number of people in the counties of Romanati, Teleorman and Dolj. The Red Cross intervened after it was requested by national authorities. The medical teams saved thousands of cholera infected patients. In a letter to the President of the Romanian Red Cross Alexandru Marghiloman, Dr. Laugier, chief physician of the county of Dolj, wrote: "With gratitude I find that the cholera epidemic was completely extinguished in the shortest possible time, giving conscientious and skilled care to patients". The Red Cross medical teams had mobile units as well as a bacteriology laboratory, where they were performed more than 7,000 medical tests. The teams reached out to 44 communes with people infected with cholera.

By the statute of the Red Cross adopted in 1876, women were not part of the leadership of the Society. In 1906, the Ladies Red Cross Society in Romania was established. Its first elected president was Irina Campineanu. The society was operated in parallel with the Romanian Red Cross and dealt with raising funds and preparing volunteers. In 1915, the General Assembly of the National Red Cross Society approved the merger of these two entities. On this occasion, patron of the Red Cross, Queen Marie, sent the following message: "The Red Cross, our hope in case of peace as in war, should not perish. Everyone of us, small to large should support it with devotion, enthusiasm and infinite love."

=== The Romanian Red Cross after the First World War ===
With the support of a large number of volunteers, the Romanian Red Cross passed the fire test of the First World War. The mission of the RNRC was to assist the military by organizing 58 hospitals in Romania. At the call of the Red Cross National Society, women belonging to various social groups volunteered to work in hospitals and canteens run by the organization. Queen Marie herself was involved in operations.

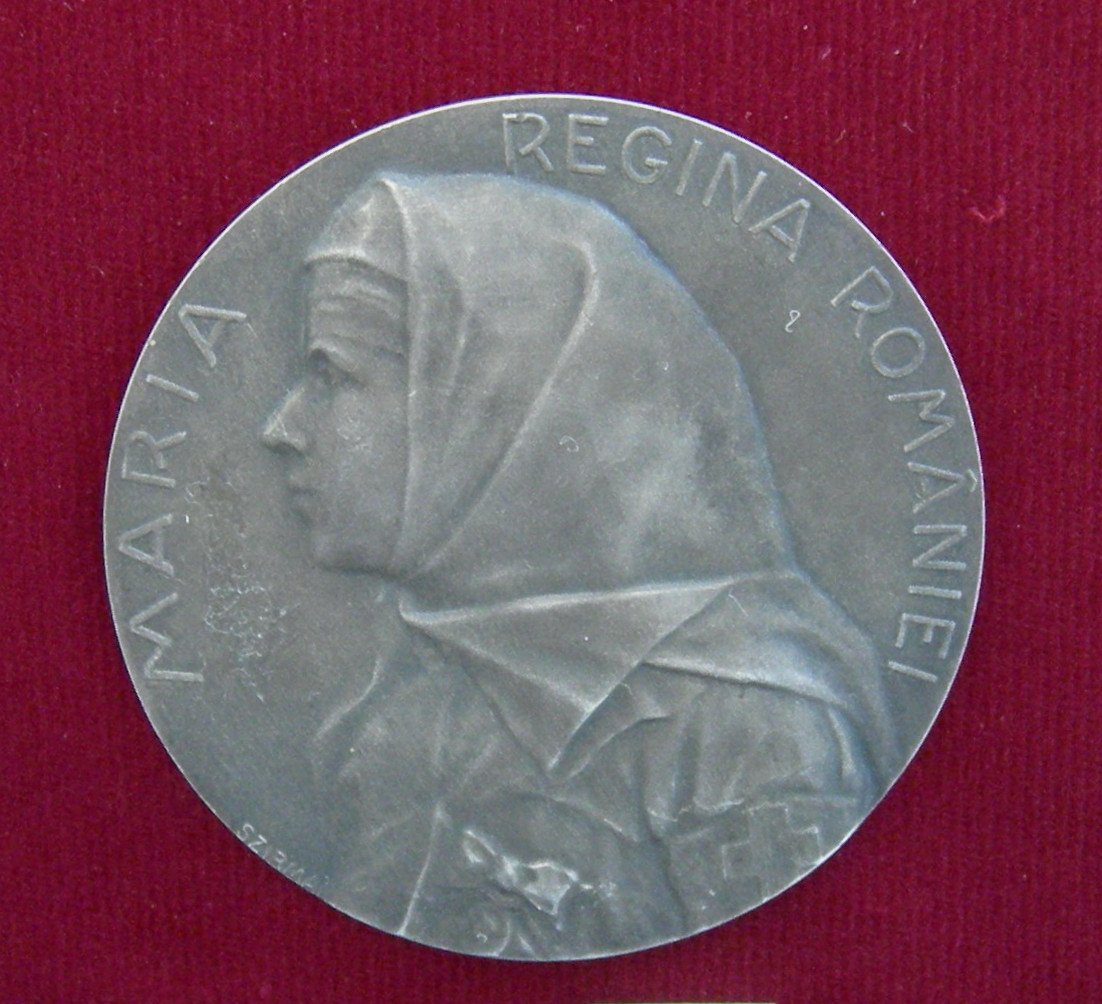
Queen Marie of Romania, on a medal in Red Cross attire

During these difficult years for the country, the Romanian Red Cross assisted more than 150,000 wounded in its own hospitals. It provided food for soldiers, refugees and people affected by conflict, facilitated the exchange of correspondence between the POWs and their families, and supported Romanian prisoners held in enemy camps with food and clothing. Funds for these operations have been mobilized by the Red Cross from public donations.

After stopping the cholera outbreak, an epidemic of typhus broke out during the armed conflict. In early 1917, the Romanian Red Cross cared for the wounded evacuated from the front and patients affected by these two infectious diseases. The occupying army requisitioned the best supplies and medical establishments of the Red Cross. In the occupied capital, over 7,000 patients were cared for. The RNRC branches were active in over 40 cities and took care of thousands of wounded and sick.

== Patrons of the Romanian Red Cross ==
- Margareta, Custodian of the Crown of Romania

== Presidents of the Romanian Red Cross ==
- Prince Dimitrie Ghica (1876–1897)
- George Gr. Cantacuzino (1897–1913)
- Ion Kalinderu (June 1913 – December 1913)
- Alexandru Marghiloman (1914–1925)
- Alexandru Constantinescu (March 1926 – November 1926)
- Gheorghe Balș (1927–1934)
- Dr. Ion Costinescu (1934–1947)
- G-ral Nicolae Pârvulescu (1947–1949)
- Constanța Crăciun (1949–1953)
- Acad. Prof. Dr. Vasile Mârza (1953–1955)
- Dr. Octavian Belea (1955–1958)
- G-ral Radu Rusescu (1958–1960)
- Anton Moisescu (1960–1972)
- G-ral Mihai Burcă (1972–1977)
- G-ral Constantin Burada (1977–1981)
- Lidia Orădeanu (1981–1986)
- Veronica Ciobănete (1986–1989)
- Nicolae Nicoară (1990–2002)
- Dr. Nifon Mihaiță (2002–2007)
- Mihaela Geoană (2007–2015)
- Margareta, Custodian of the Crown of Romania (2015–2023)
- Camelia Șucu (2023–

== Prevention and disaster relief ==
The RNRC is the only humanitarian organization in the country which has clear auxiliary duties to public authorities, especially in the field of prevention and intervention in case of disaster.

== First aid ==
The Romanian Red Cross has given basic first aid training to volunteer Red Cross nurses for over 130 years. The first courses on proper "bandaging" was organized in 1877 at the Colțea Hospital in Bucharest.

The RNRC organizes regular courses on basic first aid at each county branch. Passing the final exam of the course qualifies a person to give basic first aid.

== Health education ==
A century ago the RNRC ran campaigns against malaria and typhus. Today, the Romanian Red Cross is working to prevent and combat HIV/AIDS, tuberculosis, and avian flu. The RNRC also focuses on issues such as drug use, maternal health, combating non-communicable diseases, and respiratory and cardiovascular diseases.

The program addresses the entire population, but particularly reaches out to youth. Shares are held in partnership with governmental institutions and NGOs. Health Programs are developed with the support of volunteers trained in seminars organized by the Romanian Red Cross.

RNRC prepares and distributes information materials, such as leaflets and brochures, through educational and health-themed campaigns. The Romanian Red Cross holds annual public events about current global health issues, and also follows the event schedule of the World Health Organization.

== Social services ==
The Romanian Red Cross social program is aimed at improving the living conditions of vulnerable people. The goals of this program are to educate people to avoid situations that increase vulnerability, help vulnerable people whos lives are worsened by a disaster or crisis, and to relieve suffering by reducing vulnerability by improving the conditions of people's lives.

The program provides basic needs such as food, shelter, clothing, and healthcare particularly to those living in extreme poverty – under a dollar a day.

== Missing persons ==
The people search service is a unique program of the Red Cross in the humanitarian field. The Red Cross people search service operates in 186 countries. This service aims to reunite family members who were separated due to international armed conflicts, internal national disturbances, or natural disasters.

The Romanian Red Cross also mediates to obtain detention, imprisonment, deportation, or death certificates and transmits messages to and from conflict areas where normal communication channels have been disrupted.

== Branches ==
The RNRC has 47 branches, 1,996 sub-branches and 1,207 committees. Each county has its own branch, with Bucharest having a branch in each sector. There is a sub-branch for each city, town, commune and village.
