= Magda Lupescu =

Mistress of King Carol II of the Romanians (1899–1977)

- Princess Elena of Romania
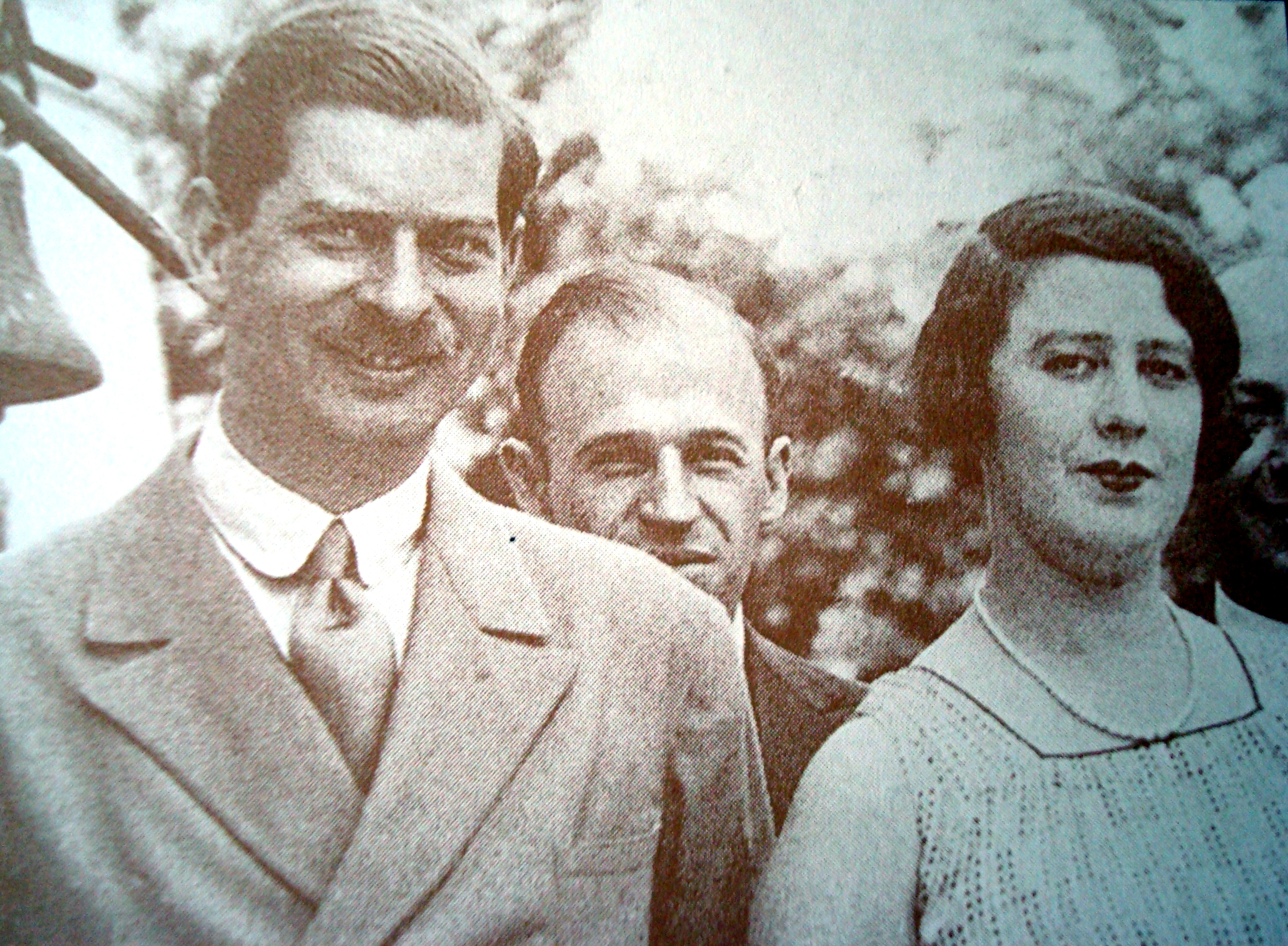
- Carol II of Romania and Magda Lupescu
- Born: Elena Lupescu; 15 September 1899; Iași, Romania
- Died: 29 June 1977 (aged 77); Estoril, Portugal
- Spouse: Ion Tâmpeanu (m. 1919; div. c. 1923); Carol II of the Romanians (m. 1947; died 1953)
- House: Hohenzollern-Sigmaringen (by marriage)
- Father: Nicolae Lupescu
- Mother: Elise Falk

Magda Lupescu (born Elena Lupescu; 3/15 September 1899 – 29 June 1977), known as Princess Elena of Romania after 1947, was the mistress and later wife of King Carol II of Romania.

== Early life and family ==
Many of the facts relating to her early life are difficult to ascertain due partly to the circumstances of the time and place, partly to unintentional mistakes and typographical errors, and partly to outright fabrications and obfuscations by her friends and enemies, as well as by herself.

Elena Lupescu was the daughter of Elise (or Eliza) Lupescu (née Falk) and Nicolae Lupescu, an apothecary. Her mother was an Austrian-born Jew who converted to the Roman Catholic Church prior to her marriage. Most sources agree that Nicolae Lupescu was born Jewish and adopted his name upon conversion to Orthodox Christianity, the established religion in Romania. There are three different versions as to his surname prior to conversion—it may have been Grünberg (variant spellings "Grunsberg", "Grümberg", etc.); or it may have been Wolff (variant spelling "Wolf"); or it may have been originally Grünberg and it was later changed to Wolff. The latter version is the most common, but the first is the most probable. Many of her close relatives also chose to change their surname to Lupu, which is Wolf[f] in Romanian. The Wolff family had been living in Romania for only a generation at the time of her birth. The origin of her nickname "Magda", by which she was later known, is obscure. According to Elena Lupescu herself, it was originally a mistake of an Italian journalist; but according to an alternative version, "Magda" was, at the time, Bucharest slang for "reformed prostitute".

She had a younger brother, Constantin Schloim Lupescu.

Lupescu was raised from birth as a Catholic. She was educated at the "Diaconesele", a Bucharest boarding school run by Bavarian nuns of the Institute of the Blessed Virgin Mary from Nymphenburg, and one of the best girls schools in the country.

According to Arthur Quinlan, at some point during Lupescu's childhood her family moved to Sulina, a port on the Danube, where Nicolae Lupescu opened a pharmacy. In 1912 they moved back to Iași, where her father started a novelty shop. Not much is known of her life during Romania's participation in World War I (1916–1918).

On 17 February 1919, in Iași, Lupescu married Ion Tâmpeanu, an officer of the Romanian Royal Army. According to Quinlan, Elena did not adapt well to garrison life and had several affairs. The marriage ended in divorce, but it is not clear when; Quinlan places it in 1920. According to Easterman, she was still married to Tâmpeanu in 1923, when she first encountered Carol. After the divorce, Elena took again her maiden name, Lupescu.

=== Speculations about origins ===
Some (e.g., Easterman, p. 81–85), suggest something mysterious about Lupescu's origins and early life, that she may have been of royal blood, an illegitimate daughter of King Carol I, and thus a cousin of Carol II. There are three main arguments: that Romanian law at the time barred Jews from owning pharmacies and hence there was something unusual about Elena's father owning one; that it was unusual for a girl of Lupescu's parentage to be accepted at one of the best schools in Bucharest; and that it was highly unusual for a Romanian army officer to be allowed to marry someone of Jewish background. A family historian recently traced the family back to Munich in the 1600s.

There is little merit to any of these arguments. As far as Romanian law of the time went, Nicolae Lupescu ceased being a Jew upon his conversion—there was nothing preventing him from owning a pharmacy. But even before his conversion, the law could have been circumvented easily in a country as rife with corruption as Romania, especially in Iași, where Jews were close to half of the city's population. Many of Lupescu's Jewish relatives were highly educated, they were upper middle class, including wealthy pharmacists and other professionals. Most of those who lived in Iași emigrated to New York during the late 1880s and 1890s because of the newly adopted anti-Semitic laws barring Jews from practicing certain professions. The majority of her family who remained in Romania had converted.

As to Lupescu's education, she was a German-speaking Catholic daughter of a Catholic mother, that is, the very student who would have been most readily admitted at a school run by German nuns. But even her being Jewish would not have necessarily constituted a major obstacle. For instance, between 1890 and 1916, Jews constituted, on average, 7% of the student body of the Lycée Gheorghe Lazăr of Bucharest, a boys' school described as "the school of the Romanian élite".

Finally, her marriage to an army officer would not have been problematic, because neither she nor her parents were legally Jewish, and most Romanians would not have regarded her as such. That came later, during the Great Depression in Romania, when the character of Romanian anti-Semitism gradually changed and her parents' Jewish origins were stressed for political reasons.

== Royal mistress ==
According to Paul-Philippe Hohenzollern, who cites Carol's diaries, she first met Crown Prince Carol (later King Carol II of the Romanians) in March 1923, when she was still married to Tâmpeanu. Two years later, in February 1925, Carol and Lupescu began a serious relationship, which endured until his death in 1953.

Lupescu was described as a witty and outspoken woman, a tall redhead with milky-white skin and green eyes. Other sources are less flattering, describing her features as coarse and her conversation as vulgar. All sources agree that she walked with a peculiar swing of the hips, which, depending on one's point of view, was either sexy or crude, and that she was, in almost every respect, the opposite of Crown Princess Helen, Carol's spouse at the time.

Carol made no effort to hide the relationship, which was, rather than his marital infidelity or Elena Lupescu's character or background, the cause of the ensuing scandal. The scandal was aggravated by Carol's earlier behavior (during the war he had contracted a morganatic marriage to Ioana "Zizi" Lambrino, although Romania's Constitution forbade Crown Princes to marry Romanian citizens), as well as by the enmity between Carol and the very powerful Brătianu clan. It was supporters of the latter who fostered the first anti-Semitic attacks against Elena Lupescu.

In December 1925, Carol, having represented the Romanian royal family at the funeral of Queen Alexandra, eventually ended up in Milan in company of Elena Lupescu, making the front page of almost every Italian newspaper.

As marriage between the monarch and Lupescu was unconstitutional and questionable on social grounds, Carol renounced his rights to the Romanian throne, as well as his membership in the royal family, adopting the name of "Carol Caraiman". The renunciation was ratified by Parliament on 4 January 1926, and four-year-old Michael, Carol's son with Crown Princess Helen, became heir apparent; Carol was banned from returning to Romania. Helen, by that time Queen Mother, divorced Carol in 1928.

King Ferdinand, Carol's father, died in 1927; Michael succeeded to the throne and a regency headed by Prince Nicholas, Carol's younger brother, came into being. The regency proved unstable, and the political instability increased when Ion I. C. Brătianu, head of the Brătianu clan and leader of the National-Liberal party, died unexpectedly. His younger brothers lacked both his strength of character and his political acumen, and their hold on power weakened. In late 1928, the Liberal government was replaced by a coalition headed by Iuliu Maniu; Carol's return seemed now to be only a matter of time. Negotiations were carried out through various intermediaries, while Carol's supporters, including Prince Nicholas and a number of Army officers, tried to pressure the government into speeding his return. Although no written evidence exists, it is likely that eventually Carol made two promises to Maniu: that he would join the regency, rather than lay claim to the throne, and that he would give up Elena Lupescu. He intended to keep neither.

Carol returned unopposed to Romania on 7 June 1930, and immediately mounted what was essentially a constitutional coup d'etat . His renunciation was declared invalid by Parliament with an overwhelming majority, and he was proclaimed king in short order on 8 June. When he brought Lupescu back is not clear; it may have been as early as the end of June, or it may have been August, but she was definitely in Bucharest by October. From then on, she was, in all but name, Carol's wife and his partner in his political enterprises.

During the reign of King Carol II (1930–1940), corruption and political intrigue in Romania rose to unprecedented heights. Carol and Magda weathered economic crisis, labor unrest, the rise of Fascism, assassination attempts and military plots, to become the master manipulators of Romanian politics. Those Carol could not bribe, he forced into retirement (Maniu) or imprisoned (Ion Antonescu); those he could not bend to his will, he suppressed ruthlessly (the Legion of the Archangel Michael, also known as the Iron Guard); and, in the process, the couple accumulated an impressive fortune.

Lupescu is sometimes described as the power behind the throne, especially by those close to the extreme right. Lupescu undoubtedly enjoyed a great deal of influence of the king, but Carol's actions were entirely consistent with his behavior prior to meeting Elena Lupescu. Moreover, the speed with which, upon his return, when she was still abroad, he outmaneuvered any opposition to his plans is ample demonstration of his political abilities. Their relationship is perhaps best viewed as a partnership, with Elena the junior, but very influential, partner.

Lupescu did not enjoy official status and until 1938 did not accompany the king on state functions. However, she entertained at her Aleea Vulpache villa in downtown Bucharest the cream of Romanian high society: politicians, industrialists (Max Auschnitt, Nicolae Malaxa), press magnates (Pamfil Șeicaru), and blue-blooded aristocrats (Marthe Bibesco). It was even rumored at some point that the leader of the violently antisemitic Iron Guard, Corneliu Zelea Codreanu, might have been hiding there from the police. This rumor was never confirmed; Codreanu was a rival of Carol's and would have been a risky person for Lupescu to shelter. In 1938 Carol orchestrated Codreanu's arrest and, soon after, ordered his assassination.

In 1938, Carol ended Romanian parliamentary democracy and proclaimed himself a dictator. However, international developments posed threats to his position. By the summer of 1940, France had fallen and the Versailles system had collapsed, leaving Romania without allies and almost completely surrounded by enemies. In quick succession, Romania was forced to make territorial concessions to the USSR, Hungary, and Bulgaria. The pressure put on Carol by these developments, exacerbated by Hitler's personal enmity, made Carol's continued rule impossible.

By early September, Carol was out of options. He was forced to abdicate in favor of his son Michael on September 6th, 1940. General Ion Antonescu assumed dictatorial powers with the support of the Army and most political parties. A few days later, Carol, Magda, and their aide Ernest Urdăreanu hurriedly packed some belongings and left Romania aboard a special train. They were fired upon during their crossing of the border as the Legionnaires of Codreanu's Iron Guard were trying to avenge their leader.

== In exile ==
They travelled to Spain, then to Portugal, and eventually they settled in Mexico City. When Romania joined the war on Hitler's side, Carol explored the possibility of setting up a Romanian government in exile; but his proposals were rebuffed by both the British and the Americans. In 1944, he contacted the Soviets with a similar purpose, but Stalin never answered and developments in Romania made Carol's proposal moot.

Lupescu did not tolerate well Mexico City's high altitude, so in 1944 they moved to Rio de Janeiro, Brazil. But her health did not improve; by early 1947 her condition was diagnosed as pernicious anaemia. After 22 years together, Carol and Elena Lupescu were finally married in a hotel room in Rio de Janeiro, either on 3 June 1947 or on 5 July 1947; it was Carol's third marriage, and Elena's second. Henceforward, she would be known as Princess Elena of Romania.

Lupescu's health improved, but they were advised to move to a more temperate climate. Carol and Elena finally settled in Estoril, on the Portuguese Riviera. There Carol died suddenly of a heart attack in 1953. His coffin, draped with the Romanian royal standard, was placed inside the royal pantheon of the Monastery of São Vicente de Fora in Lisbon. Elena survived him by 24 years, and her coffin was eventually placed next to his.

In 2003, the coffins of King Carol II and Princess Elena of Romania were brought back to the country of their birth at the request and expense of the government of Romania. They were interred in the Curtea de Argeș Monastery complex, the traditional burial ground of Romanian royalty; but, not being of royal blood, Elena was buried in the monastery's cemetery, rather than in the Royal Chapel.

== In popular culture ==
English synth-pop duo Pet Shop Boys mentioned her in the song Don Juan which was released as a b-side of their hit single Domino Dancing in 1988, although the mistress was accidentally named as Marie Lupescu.
