= Paul Philippe of Romania =

Paul-Philippe Hohenzollern
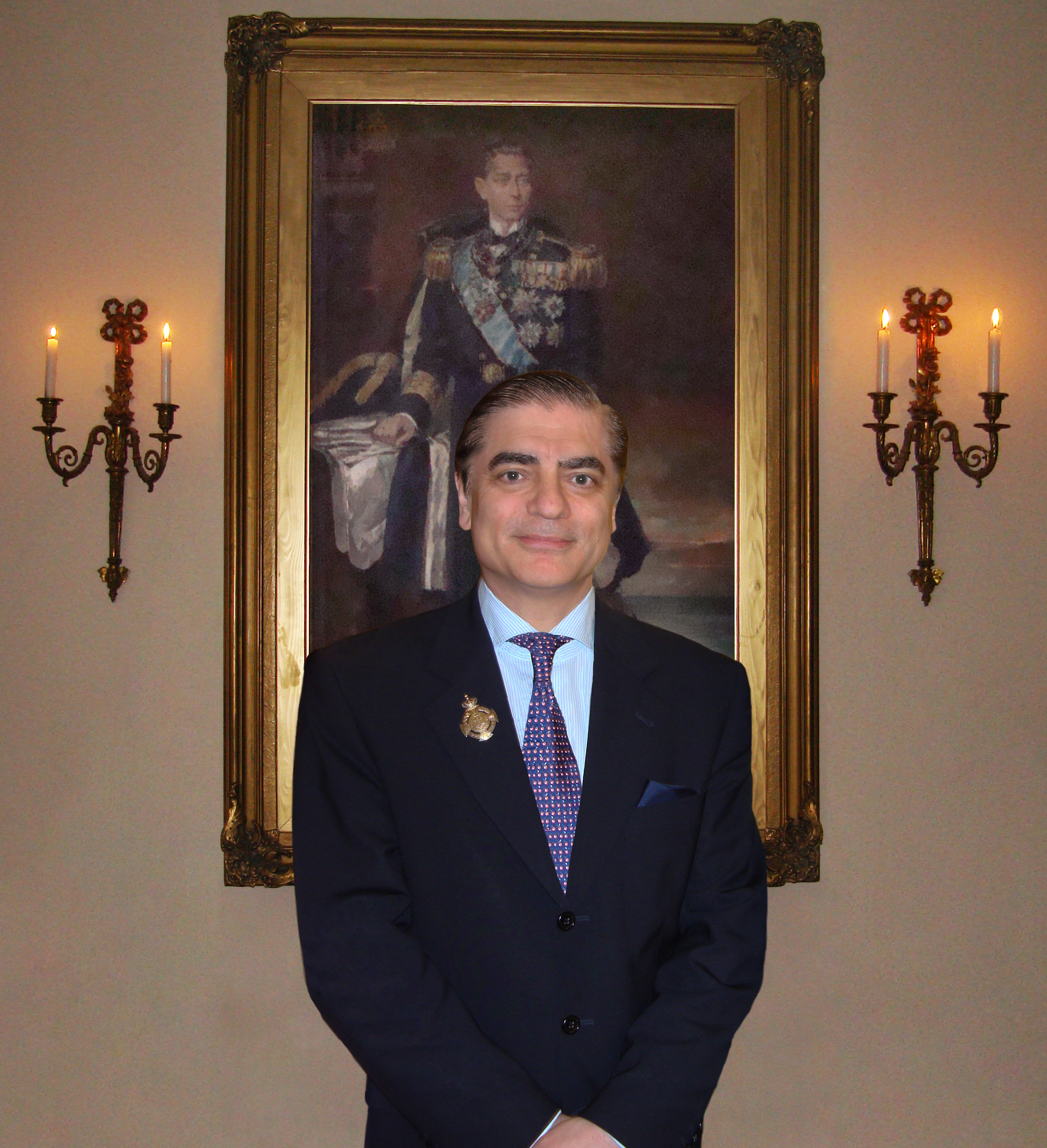
- Hohenzollern in 2007

Head of the House of Romania (disputed)
- Period: 27 January 2006 – present
- Predecessor: King Michael I
- Heir apparent: Carol Ferdinand
- Born: 13 August 1948 (age 77); Paris, France
- Spouse: Lia Georgia Triff (m. 1996)
- Issue: Carol Ferdinand
- Father: Carol Lambrino
- Mother: Léna Pastor
- Website: printulpaulderomania.ro princepaulofromania.com

Paul-Philippe Hohenzollern (born 13 August 1948), also known as Paul Lambrino and Prince Paul of Romania (Romanian: Paul-Philippe al României), is the son of Carol Lambrino and Hélène Henriette Nagavitzine. His father was the elder son of King Carol II of Romania and Zizi Lambrino. Paul-Philippe claims that he, and not Margareta of Romania, is the rightful head of the royal house of Romania.

In 2020 he was convicted, along with several other businessmen, including Remus Truică, for influence peddling, money laundering and complicated bribery cases between the years of 2006 and 2013. He became an internationally wanted fugitive until his arrest in 2022.

== Family and education ==
In 1918, the crown prince of Romania (the future King Carol II) married Zizi Lambrino. The wedding was annulled the following year because it contravened the royal house's statute. Although Lambrino was from a Phanariot Greek, former Byzantine noble family (Rangabe-Lambrino), and her father Constantin Lambrino, was a general in the Romanian army, she was still considered a commoner. The marriage took place without the consent of the king. The couple had one son, Carol Lambrino, the father of Paul Hohenzollern. In 1921, Crown Prince Carol married Princess Helen of Greece and Denmark, and they had a son who became King Michael I of Romania.

Born in Paris, Paul Hohenzollern attended a Jesuit school. He was thirteen years old when his father married an American woman and the family moved to London to be nearer to European royalty. He started school at Gordonstoun while Charles, Prince of Wales, was attending, then moving on to Millfield. He has worked as an art dealer and property developer.

In 1996, at Cașin Church, Hohenzollern married Lia Georgia Triff, a native of Dearborn, Michigan, who had previously divorced lawyer Melvin Belli. The couple have one child, Carol Ferdinand; the infant was baptised in 2010, with President Traian Băsescu taking on the role of godfather.

== Criminal conviction ==
On 17 December 2020, the High Court of Cassation and Justice sentenced him to 3 years and 4 months of prison, in the Băneasa Farm trial. The prosecution argued that the Băneasa Royal Farm never was the property of king Carol II, rendering unlawful Paul-Philippe's claim to get it, therefore the retrocession was a scam based upon corruption.

On the evening of the charge, police visited his home in Bucharest, however, according to his wife, Lia, he was in Portugal. The police arrived at his house at 8:30 p.m. The American-born Lia did not speak to the press. Bucharest Police were in the process of obtaining a European arrest warrant and released a statement: "Regarding the person sentenced to imprisonment, given that he was not found at home, the prosecution procedure begins. The activity of obtaining the European arrest warrant and implicitly of the international pursuit is starting."

He was arrested in France in June 2022, and released pending an extradition trial. In late November 2023, the Paris Court of Appeal denied the request for extradition, labeling it politically motivated.

After being arrested in Malta, as of April 2024 the Maltese authorities ordered his extradition to Romania. In first instance, his extradition was denied, but this has been appealed by the prosecution, and a retrial has been ordered. In July 2024 he has been granted bail till the trial ends. He is not allowed to leave the country, and has to report to the Police daily. The Romanian Justice Ministry sent a delegation to Malta for pleading for his extradition. The extradition demand was rejected, due to Romanian prisons being severely overcrowded.

On 7 April 2025, Paul was arrested in France on the basis of a European arrest warrant. His extradition to Romania was refused again in July 2025. His extradition was granted in June 2026.

== Succession claim ==
Hohenzollern claims to be the rightful head of Romania's royal house on the grounds that Prince Carol's marriage to Zizi Lambrino, carried out in a religious ceremony in Odessa, was never annulled in an Orthodox Church, thus rendering his subsequent marriages bigamous. Nevertheless, he states that he accepts Romania's republican form of government and does not wish to see the monarchy restored. He also points to a 1955 decision by a court in Lisbon recognising Carol Lambrino as King Carol II's first son and granting him full succession rights, a decision upheld in 1957 and 1963 in France and the following year in the United Kingdom. The latter ruling entitled Carol Lambrino to a British passport under the name "Prince of Hohenzollern, Prince of Romania".

He filed suit in Romania in 1991 against King Michael I. The case reached its conclusion in February 2012, when the High Court of Cassation and Justice extended to Romania the Lisbon court's decision recognising Carol Lambrino as the son of King Carol II. The ruling has unclear implications with regard to both throne and property succession. The leadership of the royal house remains contested, while Hohenzollern's claim to 62.5% of royal property—the share of his father plus that of King Carol II's widow Elena Lupescu, which she granted to him—remains undefined and may refer either to the king's personal property or to that of the royal house, the boundary between which is not clearly drawn. Hohenzollern greeted the decision "with enthusiasm and responsibility", promising "many trials" to sort out inheritance issues and vowing to donate his share of Peleș Castle to the Romanian government, should he obtain it. King Michael's office issued a statement saying the decision creates no dynastic rights, (Note: In Romanian law dynastic rights, titles of nobility and the institution of the Royal House do not exist.) that only he can determine the membership of the royal house, and that no Romanian king has ever recognised or granted a title to Carol Lambrino or to his descendants.

In the 2000 Romanian presidential election, Hohenzollern was an unsuccessful independent candidate. In 2005, Hohenzollern claimed that King Michael created and ran a Nazi state between 1940 and 1944, encouraging and approving the deportation and murder of Romanian Jews; as a result, he called for Michael's execution. Writing in The Jerusalem Post, historian Jean Ancel dismissed Hohenzollern's claims and praised the wartime actions of the king and his mother, Queen Helen. In 2011, when Michael broke off ties with the House of Hohenzollern-Sigmaringen to form the House of Romania, Paul objected, labelling the move "an inexplicable gesture" severing "historical and dynastic ties" to the German house.

In December 2011, Hohenzollern was named "Ambassador of Romanian-Chinese Friendship" in Beijing.

After the 2012 final verdict of the Romanian Supreme Court of Justice recognising Paul as one of King Carol II's heirs, his uncle, King Michael I, reportedly invited Paul to reconciliation talks.

== Notable published works ==
- King Carol II: A Life of my Grandfather. London: Methuen. 1988. ISBN 0413165701.

== Electoral history ==
=== Presidential elections ===
Election	Affiliation	First round			Second round		
Election	Affiliation	Votes	Percentage	Position	Votes	Percentage	Position
2000	Party of National Reconciliation	55,238	0.5%	10th			

== Notes ==
Paul Philippe of Romania
Romanian royalty
Preceded by Michael I	— TITULAR — Head of the Romanian royal family Disputed by King Michael I (2006–17) and Margareta of Romania (since 2017); 27 January 2006 – present	Incumbent; Heir apparent: Carol Ferdinand
