= Zizi Lambrino =

First wife of King Carol II of Romania

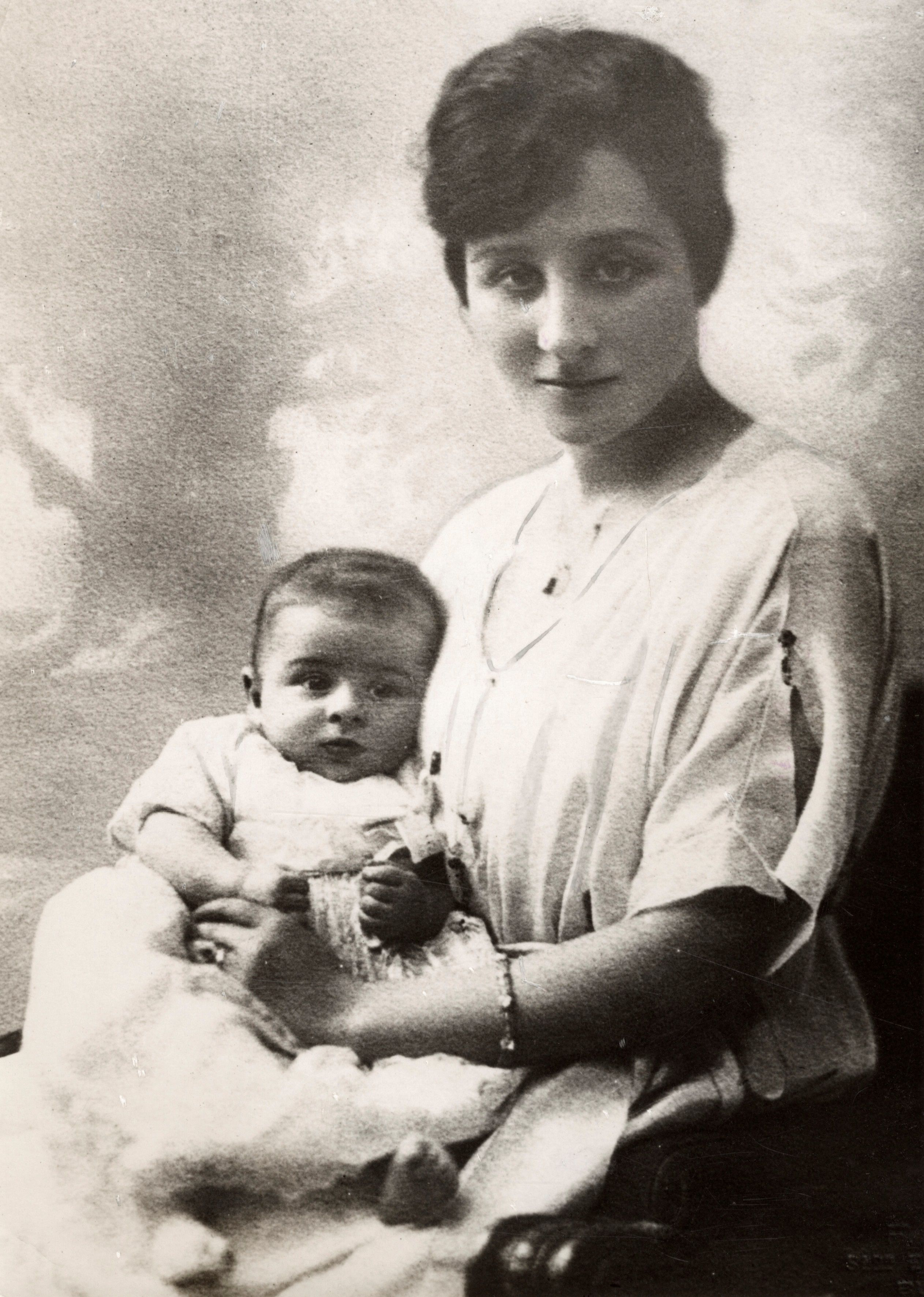
- Lambrino with her son
- Born: 3 October 1898; Roman, Kingdom of Romania
- Died: 11 March 1953 (aged 54); Neuilly-sur-Seine, France
- Spouse: Carol II of Romania (m. 1918; ann. 1919)
- Children: Carol Lambrino

Joanna Marie Valentina "Zizi" Lambrino (3 October 1898 – 11 March 1953) was the first wife of the later King Carol II of Romania. They had one son, Carol, born in 1920, in Bucharest.

== Life ==
Lambrino was born in Roman, Kingdom of Romania in 1898 to a Phanariot Greek family of former noble Byzantine origins, the Rangabe-Lambrino family. She was the daughter of Romanian Colonel, later General, Constantin Lambrino (d. 1916) and his wife, Euphrosine Alcaz (1875–1930). Joanna Lambrino met the Crown Prince Carol, a Hohenzollern who was the son of King Ferdinand of Romania and Queen Marie of Romania, in Iaşi in the Kingdom of Romania in 1918, during the First World War. The Romanian royal court had adjourned from Bucharest to Iaşi, to keep its distance from a German invasion. Journalist A.L. Easterman would later write that "Carol fell violently in love and was at no pains to dissemble it", despite the obvious disapproval of the royal court for his bestowing his affections on a commoner. Even so, there are several photographs of Zizi Lambrino and Prince Carol at the royal family residences and together with other members of the Romanian royal family. Lulu, Zizi's brother, was one of Carol's best friends and they corresponded with each other throughout their lives.

Some say their union was opposed by his parents, but Carol "smuggled" her across the former Russian frontier and they were officially married in the Orthodox Cathedral of Odesa, Ukraine, on 31 August 1918, in the presence of witnesses. Carol's parents were furious. The king ordered him to be kept in close confinement in Bistrița Monastery for seventy-five days. Prime Minister Ion I. C. Brătianu practically accused Carol of treason. Prince Carol threatened to renounce his right of royal succession and, indeed, when in August 1919 the Romanian Supreme Court ruled the marriage unconstitutional, unlawful and annulled it, Carol signed documents of renunciation. However, as Easterman describes it, "intriguers... cunningly... [threw] other young and attractive women in his view and society" and eventually "corroded his relations with his wife..."

Carol and Zizi Lambrino had one son, Mircea Gregor Carol Lambrino (8 August 1920 – 27 January 2006). Carol and the Romanian government continued to pay Lambrino's maintenance and that of her son in their French exile.

Zizi Lambrino died in Neuilly-sur-Seine, near Paris, France, on 11 March 1953. Her former husband, the now ex-King Carol II, died in exile in Estoril, Portugal, shortly after on 4 April 1953.

== Archives ==
Zizi Lambrino's personal papers (including diaries, correspondence and photographs related to her marriage to Carol II of Romania) are preserved in the "Jeanne Marie Valentine Lambrino Papers" collection in the Hoover Institution Archives (Stanford, California, US).

== Descendants ==
Her son, Mircea Gregor Carol Lambrino, was named in memory of Prince Mircea of Romania (1913–1916), Carol's youngest brother, who had died four years previous to the former's birth, but he would later be known as "Carol" rather than "Mircea." Mircea/Carol married three times, firstly (1944–1950) to Opera singer Hélène Nagavitzine (a.k.a. Léna Pastor); they had one son, Paul-Philippe Hohenzollern. He next married Jeanne Williams (1960–1977); they had one son, Ion Nicolas George Alexander Hohenzollern (born 1961 in Dorset, England). He married his third wife, Antonia Colville, in 1984 and they remained married until he died in 2006.

In response to a suit by her grandson Paul, a Romanian Court determined in 1996 that her marriage was legal. This places a shadow over the status of Carol II's son, the de facto King of Romania Michael, because if Carol's marriage to Zizi Lambrino was never properly ended, that could invalidate his later royal marriage to Helen of Greece and Denmark, Michael's mother.

ChivalricOrders.org sees this shadow as very slight: "The legality of the annulment of the marriage was not only unchallenged at the time, but significantly, after eventually becoming King, Carol II did not attempt to undo this act nor declare his son Mircea legitimate. Neither did he ever name Mircea as his heir..."; further, "the annulment" although contested by Carol at the time was "... eventually acknowledged by Carol II himself who remarried twice."

== Notes ==
1. Easterman, 1942, 33.
2. Easterman, 1942, 33–34.
3. Easterman, 1942, 34.
4. Easterman, 1942, 34–35.
5. ChivalricOrders.org for the name of her son.
6. ChivalricOrders.org.
7. Simpson, p. A-4. This is citation only for the date of the court decision.
