= Prince Mircea of Romania =

Romanian prince

Prince Mircea
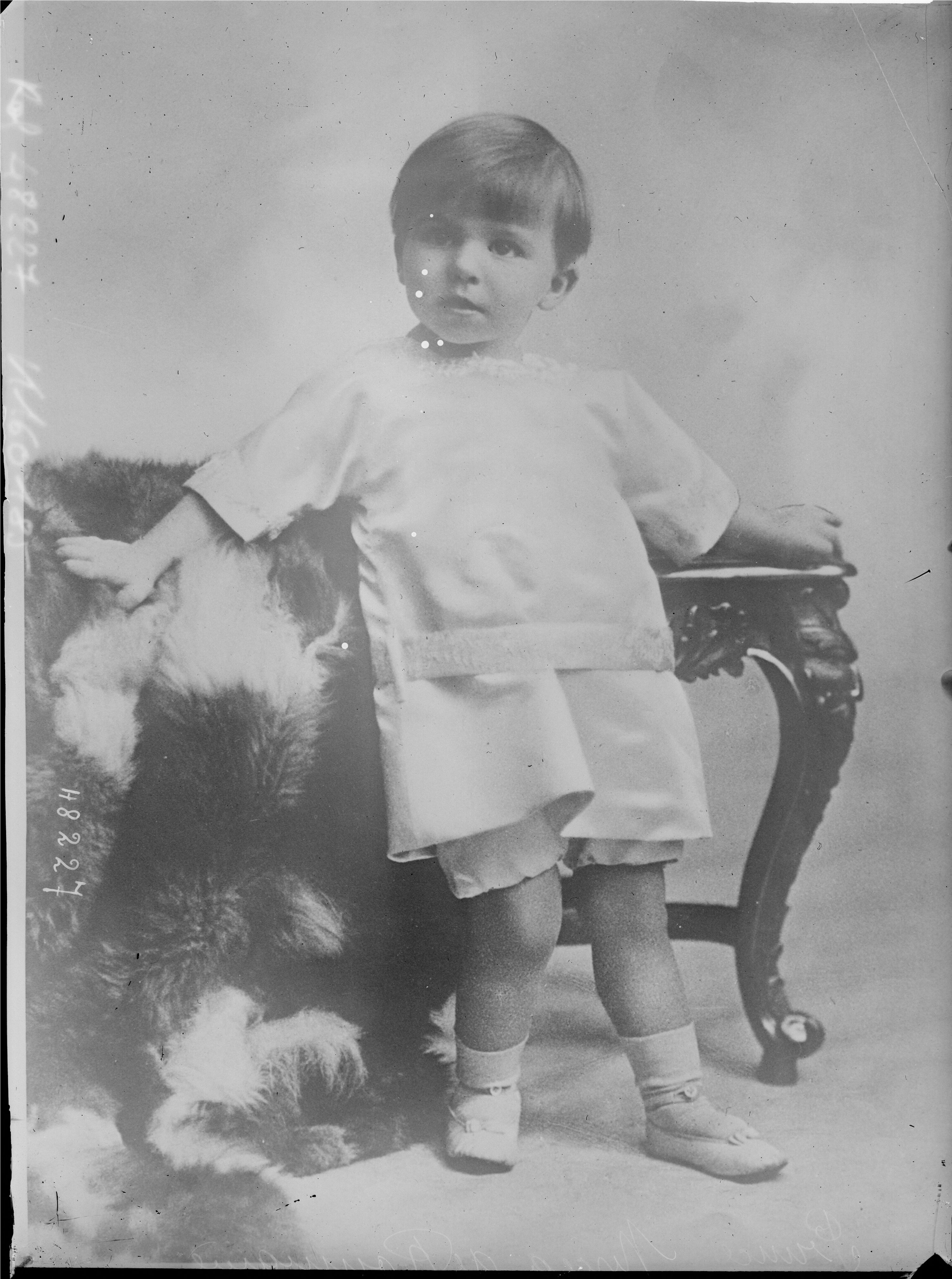
- Prince Mircea in 1916
- Born: 3 January 1913 [O.S. 21 December 1912]^{Note 1} Cotroceni Palace, Bucharest, Kingdom of Romania
- Died: 2 November 1916 (aged 3); Știrbey Domain, Buftea, Kingdom of Romania
- Burial: The New Archbishopric and Royal Cathedral in Curtea de Argeș
- House: Hohenzollern-Sigmaringen
- Father: Ferdinand I of Romania (officially); Barbu Știrbey (rumored)
- Mother: Marie of Edinburgh

Prince Mircea of Romania (Romanian pronunciation: [ˈmirtʃe̯a]; 3 January 1913 – 2 November 1916) was the third son and youngest child of King Ferdinand of Romania and Marie of Edinburgh and a great-grandchild of Queen Victoria through his mother. He died aged 3 in November 1916.

== Birth ==
Prince Mircea was born in Bucharest on 3 January 1913 [O.S. 21 December 1912], as the third son and youngest child of the Crown Prince Ferdinand of Romania^{Note 2} and the Crown Princess Marie of Edinburgh. He was baptised on 2 February [O.S. 20 January] 1913 at the Royal Palace (presently the National Museum of Art). Prince Eitel Friedrich of Prussia arrived by train to Bucharest to represent his father. He was met there by King Carol I, Crown Prince Ferdinand and Prince Carol. His godparents were the German Emperor Wilhelm II, King Carol I, Queen Elisabeth and Empress Maria Feodorovna of Russia. His mother, the Crown Princess, was absent due to a possible attack of phlebitis. During his short life, he was known to get along very well with his sister, Princess Ileana of Romania. His governess was Mary Green^{Note 3}.

== Death ==
Prince Mircea died at Buftea on 2 November 1916 of typhoid fever during a time of war when the enemy troops were approaching Bucharest and many battles were taking place close to the city. The royal family had to quickly bury him in the chapel of Cotroceni Palace, before they went into retreat to Iași, the old capital of Moldavia, the unoccupied part north-eastern Romania. His death certificate was partially burnt. His original tombstone read:

Here lies the youngest son of King Ferdinand and Queen Marie, born 21 December 1912 and died October 1916, in time of war, while the soldiers of Romania were sacrificing their lives for the centuries’ dream of achieving national unity. For two years, he remained the sole guardian of the home of his parents, over which the country’s flag had ceased to fly. Mourn for him, for he shared with us the days of suffering, but the days of rejoicing he did not live to see.

In 1920, Mircea's eldest brother, the future Carol II, named his child with Zizi Lambrino Mircea Grigore, in memory of Prince Mircea who had died just four years earlier. In 1941, Mircea was reburied, at the request of Princess Ileana, from Cotroceni to the little chapel of Bran Castle, close to the burial place of Marie's heart.

== Etymology ==
Mircea is an exclusively Romanian-used name that is derived from the Old Slavic mir meaning "peace" or "world".

Prince Mircea was named after Mircea I of Wallachia, a medieval Romanian Prince of Wallachia who organised a vigorous resistance to the Turks in the 14th century, and whose troops fought side by side with the Serbians on the fatal field of Kossovo.

== Ancestry ==
Ancestors of Prince Mircea of Romania

8. Charles Anthony, Prince of Hohenzollern
4. Leopold, Prince of Hohenzollern
9. Princess Josephine of Baden
2. Ferdinand I of Romania
10. Ferdinand II of Portugal
5. Infanta Antónia of Portugal
11. Maria II of Portugal
1. Prince Mircea of Romania
12. Albert, Prince Consort
6. Alfred, Duke of Saxe-Coburg and Gotha
13. Victoria of the United Kingdom
3. Marie of Edinburgh
14. Alexander II of Russia
7. Grand Duchess Maria Alexandrovna of Russia
15. Marie of Hesse

== Notes ==
- ^Note 1 The most common used date is January 3, but the date on his first tomb had the Old Style date, 22 December 1912.
- ^Note 2 It was believed at the time that his biological father was Prince Barbu Știrbey and now most historians agree that this is true.
- ^Note 3 Mary Green was also the governess of his sister, Princess Ileana and his brother, Prince Nicholas.
