= Carol Lambrino =

Son of Carol of Romania and Zizi Lambrino (1920–2006)

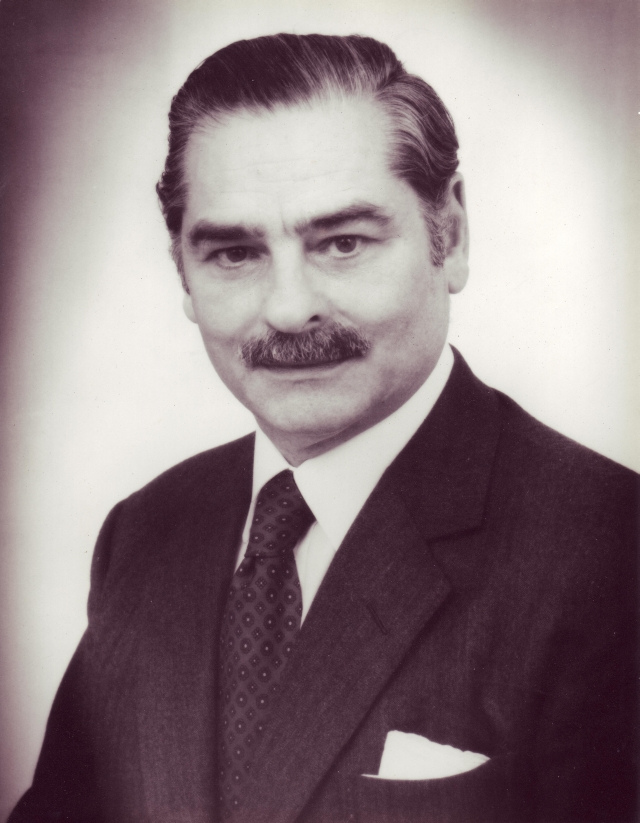
- Born: 8 January 1920; Bucharest, Kingdom of Romania
- Died: 27 January 2006 (aged 86); London, England
- Burial place: Cozia Monastery
- Spouses: Hélène Henriette Nagavitzine (m. 1948; div. 1958) Thelma Williams (m. 1960; div. 1977) Antonia Colville (m. 1984)
- Children: Paul-Philippe Hohenzollern; Alexander Hohenzollern
- Parents: Carol II of Romania (father); Zizi Lambrino (mother)

Mircea Grigore Carol Hohenzollern (born Mircea Grigore Carol Lambrino; 8 January 1920 – 27 January 2006), also known as Prince Mircea Grigore Carol al României (anglicised as: of Romania) according to his amended Romanian birth certificate or as Carol Lambrino (Romanian pronunciation: [ˈkarol lambrino]), was the elder son of King Carol II of Romania.

== Early life ==
Carol Lambrino was born in Bucharest as son of Crown Prince Carol of Romania and his first wife, Zizi Lambrino. At the time of his birth he was registered with the name Mircea Grigore Carol Lambrino. He was named by his father after his youngest brother Prince Mircea of Romania who died in 1916. His grandfather King Ferdinand forced the annulment of his parents' marriage in January 1919 in the Supreme Court of Romania and Carol was born outside the 300-day period allowed to permit legitimacy, on 8 January 1920. The legality of the annulment has been questioned.

After his birth, Carol and his mother were forced to leave Romania and settled in Paris. During his younger years and his reign, including during his personal dictatorship (1938–1940) when he held absolute power in Romania, King Carol II recognized the paternity of Mircea Carol on several ocassions. One of these situations was a letter published on the front page by the Romanian daily newspaper Epoca (17 January 1920). Signed by Crown Prince Carol, the document is a statement in which the future king recognized his paternity of Zizi Lambrino's baby.

== Legitimisation ==
After the death of his father, former King Carol II, in Portugal, 4 April 1953, Carol claimed the right to inherit some of his father's estate in accordance with Portuguese law. In order to do so, it was necessary to prove that he was his father's legitimate son.

On 2 April 1955, a Portuguese court ruled that Carol was the legitimate first-born son of King Carol II and allowed him to claim the surname Hohenzollern in place of Lambrino. On 6 March 1957, the Portuguese ruling was recognised in France by an Exequatur of the Tribunal of the Grande Instance of Paris. This allowed Carol rights of inheritance to his father's French properties. Carol's younger half-brother Michael appealed this ruling which was upheld by the Court of Cassation, 8 January 1963.

In October 1995 a Romanian court ruled that Carol was the legitimate son of King Carol II. His half-brother, Michael, appealed this ruling, but lost the case in an upper court of appeal in 1999. In March 2002, the Supreme Court of Romania ruled that there should be a retrial, and in July 2002 a lower court ruled again in Carol's favour. Michael again appealed, and in January 2003 he again lost the appeal. Michael again appealed in December 2003.

Carol visited Bucharest in November 2005. That was the first time he went to Romania after he had attended the funeral of his grandmother Queen Marie in 1938.

Two months later, Carol died in London. He was buried in Romania after a funeral held at the Cozia Monastery. He never claimed the defunct throne of Romania, unlike his son Paul.

== Marriages and children ==
Carol was married three times:

- His first marriage was on 22 March 1944 in Paris to Hélène Henriette Nagavitzine, known as opera singer Léna Pastor (26 May 1925 – December 1998), with whom he had one son before divorcing in 1960:
  - Paul-Philippe Hohenzollern (13 August 1948) he married Lia Georgia Triff in 1996. They have one son.
- His second marriage was to Jeanne Williams (15 November 1930 in Nashville, Tennessee – 5 June 1988 in Rutland, Vermont) on 20 December 1960, with whom he had one son before divorcing in 1977:
  - Ion George Nicholas Alexander Lambrino (born 1 September 1961)
- His third wife was Antonia Colville (29 May 1939 in Bracken, Church Crookham, Hampshire – 13 June 2007), the great granddaughter of Charles Colville, 1st Viscount Colville of Culross at Fulham Town Hall on 27 June 1984. Carol and his third wife settled in Parsons Green with several cats and a dachshund named Otto von Habsburg.
