= New Jewish Cemetery, Bacău =

Jewish cemetery in Bacău, Romania

- Cimitirul Comunității Evreiești
- The New Jewish Cemetery in 2017
- Interactive map of New Jewish Cemetery, Bacău

Details
- Established: 1917
- Location: 16 Alexei Tolstoi Street, Bacău
- Country: Romania
- Coordinates: 46.547211°N 26.902218°E
- Type: Jewish cemetery
- Owned by: Jewish community

The New Jewish Cemetery (Cimitirul Nou Evreiesc) in Bacău, Romania, also known as the Jewish Community Cemetery (Cimitirul Comunității Evreiești), is a Jewish cemetery established in 1917. Located at 16 Alexei Tolstoi Street, it replaced the city's Old Jewish Cemetery as the principal burial ground of Bacău's Jewish community. The cemetery contains the graves of members of Bacău's Jewish community, a cemetery chapel, the tomb of Rabbi Bezalel Ze'ev Șafran, and a memorial to Jewish victims of the Holocaust in Romania.

== History ==
Bacău has had an organized Jewish community since at least the 18th century. The city's old Jewish cemetery contains gravestones dating from the beginning of that century, while records of the local chevra kadisha, the Jewish burial society responsible for administering the cemetery, date from later in the century.

By the early 20th century, the old cemetery had become full. Burials there continued until 1917, when the present cemetery was opened on Alexei Tolstoi Street. It subsequently became the principal cemetery of Bacău's Jewish community.

A cemetery chapel was built in 1928.

Among those buried in the cemetery is Rabbi Bezalel Ze'ev Șafran (1866–1930), who served as a rabbi in Bacău and was the father of Alexandru Șafran, who later became Chief Rabbi of Romania. Șafran's grave is housed in an ohel within the cemetery.

== Holocaust memorial ==
A memorial commemorating Jewish victims of fascism and the Holocaust was erected in the cemetery in 1959. It is situated near the cemetery entrance and consists of a stone monument bearing commemorative inscriptions in Romanian and Hebrew.

== Vandalism ==
During the night of 18–19 March 2025, the cemetery was vandalized with fascist, racist and antisemitic symbols. Eighteen grave markers were defaced, along with a memorial to victims of fascism and a wall of the cemetery's mortuary chapel. The symbols included swastikas, the number "88" and a Celtic cross.

An 18-year-old suspect was detained on 24 March and subsequently placed under judicial control. Prosecutors accused him of destruction, desecration of graves and places of worship, and the public use of fascist, racist, xenophobic and antisemitic symbols. On 12 June 2025, prosecutors ordered that he be sent to trial. On 11 May 2026, he was sentenced to one year and two months' imprisonment, suspended under supervision for two years.

== Gallery ==
The cemetery in October 2017

View of the cemetery

The cemetery grounds

Another view of the cemetery

== See also ==
- History of the Jews in Romania
- The Holocaust in Romania
