= Ieremias Kalligiorgis =

Greek Orthodox archbishop (1935–2025)

His Eminence Ieremias
- Metropolitan of Switzerland
- Native name: Ιερεμίας Καλλιγιώργης
- Church: Greek Orthodox Church
- Installed: 2003
- Term ended: 2018
- Predecessor: Damaskinos Papandreou of Adrianople
- Successor: Maximos Pothos

Personal details
- Born: Paraschos Kalligiorgis; 17 January 1935 Kos, Greece
- Died: 20 June 2025 (aged 90) Kos, Greece
- Education: Halki seminary

Ieremias Kalligiorgis (Greek: Ιερεμίας Καλλιγιώργης; 17 January 1935 – 20 June 2025) was a Greek Orthodox archbishop and metropolitan.

== Biography ==
Born in Kos on 17 January 1935, Kalligiorgis joined the Halki seminary in 1952 and graduated in 1959. That year, he was ordained a deacon. He then left for France and was ordained a priest on 26 July 1964 by Meletios. On 9 June 1988, he was named Primate of the Greek Orthodox Metropolis of France and served until 2003, when he was succeeded by Emmanuel Adamakis. On 19 November 1997, he was elected to a five-year term as president of the Conference of European Churches. On 20 January 2003, he was named Metropolitan of Switzerland by Bartholomew I of Constantinople and concurrently became director of the Orthodox Center of the Ecumenical Patriarchate of Chambésy. On 18 July 2018, he was named Bishop of the Metropolis of Ancyra, which was re-established for the first time since 1922. He was succeeded in Switzerland by Maximos Pothos.

Kalligiorgis died in Kos on 20 June 2025, at the age of 90.

== Distinctions ==
- Legion of Honour (2001)
