= Helen of Greece =

Helen of Greece may refer to:

- Helen of Troy, daughter of Zeus and Leda in Greek mythology
- Helen of Greece and Denmark (1896–1982), Greek and Danish princess
