= Queen Elena =

Queen Elena may refer to:

- Elena of Montenegro (1873–1952), a Montenegrin princess and Queen of Italy
- Helen of Greece and Denmark (1896–1982), queen mother of Romania
