= Greek Orthodox Metropolis of Switzerland =

Orthodox

Location
- Country: Swiss Confederation and Principality of Liechtenstein
- Headquarters: Pregny-Chambésy, Geneva

Statistics
- Area: 41.445 km^{2} (16.002 sq mi)
- Parishes: 11

Information
- Denomination: Eastern Orthodox
- Rite: Byzantine Rite
- Established: 1982
- Cathedral: Church of Saint Paul the Apostle
- Language: Greek, French, German, Italian

Current leadership
- Parent church: Ecumenical Patriarchate of Constantinople
- Patriarch: Bartholomew I of Constantinople
- Metropolitan: Maximos Pothos
- Vicar General: Archimandrite Fanourios Tholiotis

The Sacred Metropolis of Switzerland or Greek Orthodox Metropolis of Switzerland (Greek: Ιερά Μητρόπολις Ελβετίας) is a diocese of the Ecumenical Patriarchate of Constantinople, founded on 2 October 1982, with its seat at Pregny-Chambésy, a commune in the canton of Geneva. Its territory includes the Swiss Confederation and the Principality of Liechtenstein.

== History ==
The first Greek immigrants arrived in Switzerland in the 18th century, but only until 1925 was the first church built in Lausanne. In 1982 the Patriarch of Constantinople created the diocese of Switzerland, with its first bishop being Damaskinos Papandreou.

The incumbent Metropolitan bishop is Maximos Pothos, who is also Director of the Orthodox Center of the Ecumenical Patriarchate in Chambésy and President of the Assembly of Canonical Orthodox Bishops of Switzerland and Liechtenstein.

== Metropolitans of Switzerland ==
- Damaskinos Papandreou (1982 - 2003)
- Ieremias Kalligiorgis (2003 - 2018)
- Maximos Pothos (2018–present)

== Organization ==
=== Districts ===
District	Jurisdiction - Cantons
French-speaking Switzerland	Geneva, Vaud, Valais, Neuchâtel and Fribourg
German-speaking Switzerland	Principality of Liechtenstein and Bern, Zurich, Lucerne, Nidwalden, Obwalden, Schwyz, Schaffhausen, Uri, Zug, Appenzell Ausserrhoden, Appenzell Innerrhoden, Glarus, St. Gallen, Grisons, Thurgau, Basel-Stadt, Basel-Landschaft, Jura, Aargau, Solothurn and Baden
Italian-speaking Switzerland	Ticino

=== Parishes ===
- Geneva
  - Greek Orthodox Parish of Saint Paul the Apostle
  - French-speaking Orthodox Parish of Saint Catherine - Holy Trinity
  - Romanian Orthodox Parish of the Nativity of the Venerable and Glorious Prophet and Forerunner John the Baptist
- Lausanne
  - Greek Orthodox Parish of Saint Gerasimos of Cephalonia
- Fribourg
  - Orthodox Parish of Protection of Intercession of the Theotokos - Silouan the Athonite
- Chavornay
  - Orthodox Parish of Nativity of the Blessed Virgin Mary (French speaking)
- Bern
  - Greek Orthodox Parish of Presentation of the Blessed Virgin Mary
- Zurich
  - Greek Orthodox Parish of Holy Great-Martyr Demetrius the Myroblyte
- St. Gallen
  - Greek Orthodox Parish of the Holy Great Sovereigns Constantine and Helen of Eastern Switzerland and the Principality of Liechtenstein
- Basel
  - Greek Orthodox Parish of God's Holy Wisdom Western Switzerland
- Olten
  - Parish of Saint George
- Baden
  - Romanian Orthodox Parish of the Nativity of Mary
- Lugano
  - Greek Orthodox Parish of Ticino-Lugano

== See also ==
- Assembly of Canonical Orthodox Bishops of Switzerland and Liechtenstein
- Greeks in Switzerland
- Greece–Switzerland relations
