= Old Jewish Cemetery, Bacău =

Closed cemetery in Bacău, Romania

Old Jewish Cemetery of Bacău
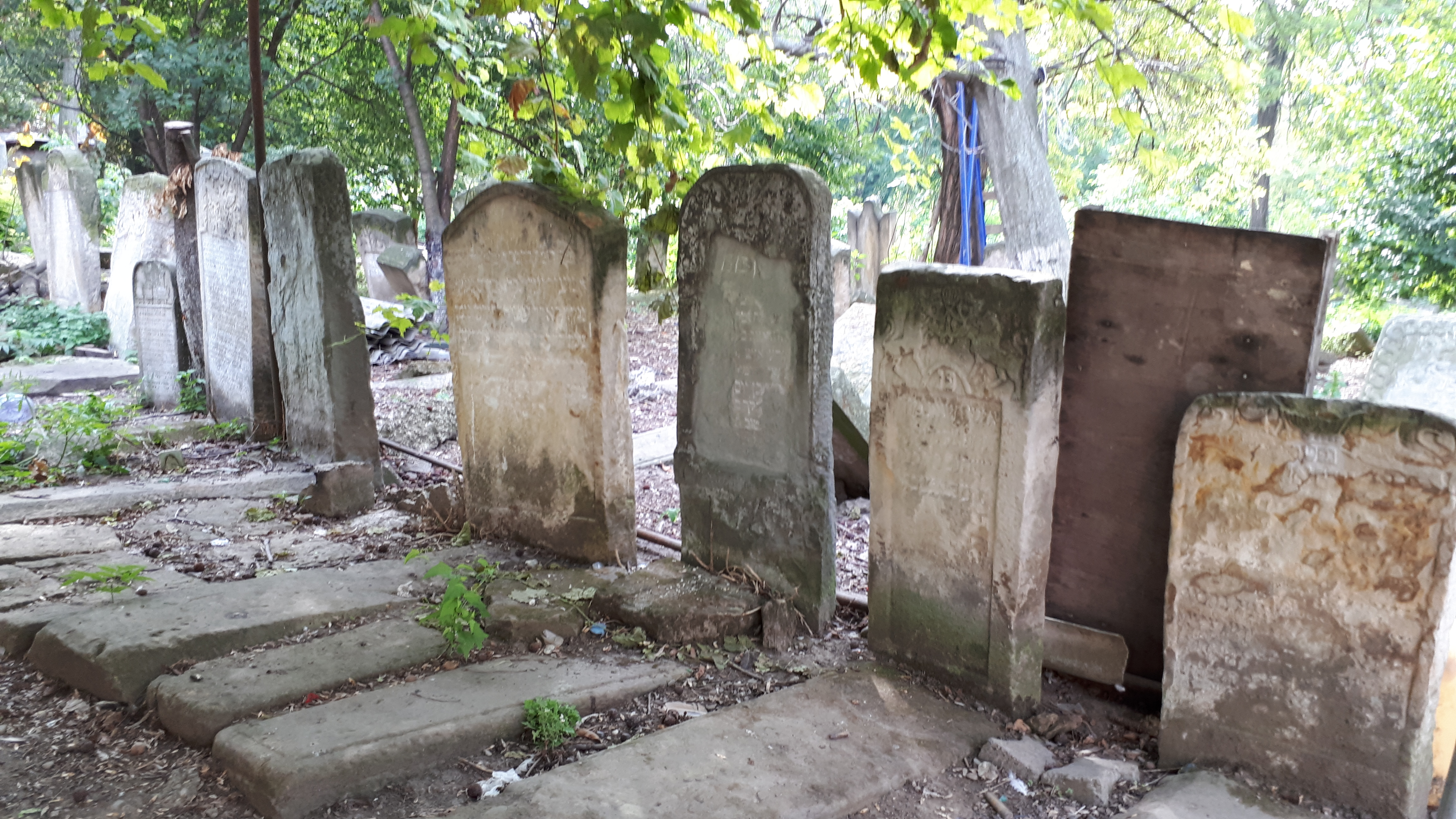
- The Old Jewish Cemetery in October 2017
- Interactive map of Old Jewish Cemetery of Bacău

Details
- Established: No later than 1703
- Location: Pictor Theodor Aman Street, Bacău
- Country: Romania
- Coordinates: 46°33′34″N 26°55′0″E
- Type: Jewish cemetery
- Owned by: Jewish community
- Size: 230mX90m

The Old Jewish Cemetery in Bacău, Romania is a closed cemetery that was used by the Jewish community of the city from at least the early 18th century until 1917, when the New Jewish Cemetery was opened. The cemetery is located in the center of Bacau, bordered by Pictor Theodor Aman Street from the north and Ghioceilor street in the east, just a few meters from the Athletics Hall, the Bacovia University and the Zimbru neighborhood. Among others, were also buried here former participants in the Romanian War of Independence of 1877. By 1912 the cemetery became full and the last burial took place in 1917 when the new cemetery was opened.

== History ==
Gravestones in the Old Jewish Cemetery, 2017

According to the spokesman of Bacau City Hall "the land does not belong to the municipality". Other (unofficial) sources from the City Hall even stated that the land does not even belong to the Romanian state.

The former president of the Jewish community, Hari Vigdar (died 2013), said that "we too do not know much about this cemetery. It was closed at the beginning of the twentieth century and is listed in our records as being repaired. We do not have any money to restore, we only have someone to look after and protect the place. We have not heard that a member living in our community has relatives buried there. The monuments are very difficult to read, they have deteriorated, and the writing is in Old Hebrew.

Iacob Psantir, researcher of Jewish history in Romania published a book in 1871 in which he described the cemetery: "In this cemetery there are many other tomb stones which cannot be read, since for some the letters are erased by time, while others are buried so deep that I could not dig them up to read. However, the one that I did find and could read has marvellous and legible letters, but somehow was never mentioned in any registry".

The oldest tombstone found in the cemetery belongs to a person called "Aaron, the son of Yossef". He died in 1703. The researcher I. Kara researched the cemetery in 1936 and 1946 and found the tombstone mentioned by Mr.Psantir. He copied the inscription from the stone and published an essay claiming that this stone dated 1703 couldn't be the oldest one in the city, but does show that beginning of the 18th century there existed a Jewish population of numerical significance. The inscription from this tombstone reads: "This important man, honourable Aharon, son of departed Yosef, died on the 29th of Ijar, buried on the 15th Sivan year 5464". It is still a mystery why so many days had passed between the death and the burial of Aharon, knowing that in the Jewish tradition it is disrespectful for the dead to wait that long before burying him. After careful consideration, Mr.Kara decided that he had to have died somewhere where there wasn't a Jewish cemetery, and he was buried there temporarily, but later exhumed and transported to Bacau for his final resting-place. After World War II it was transferred to the Jewish History Museum in Romania in Bucharest.

== Urban legends ==
Until the 70s people were looking for gold, believing that the wealthy Jews were buried with everything. Gold has never been found, but children playing around have found swords from the Independence War. It was also said that over some of the graves there is night flames, sign that there are hidden treasures from the Second World War. Also, according to other rumors, the cemetery had monuments from Vienna and Paris, some of which were made by the artist Auguste Rodin himself.

== Gallery ==
The Old Jewish Cemetery in 2017

View of the cemetery

The cemetery grounds

Gravestones in the cemetery

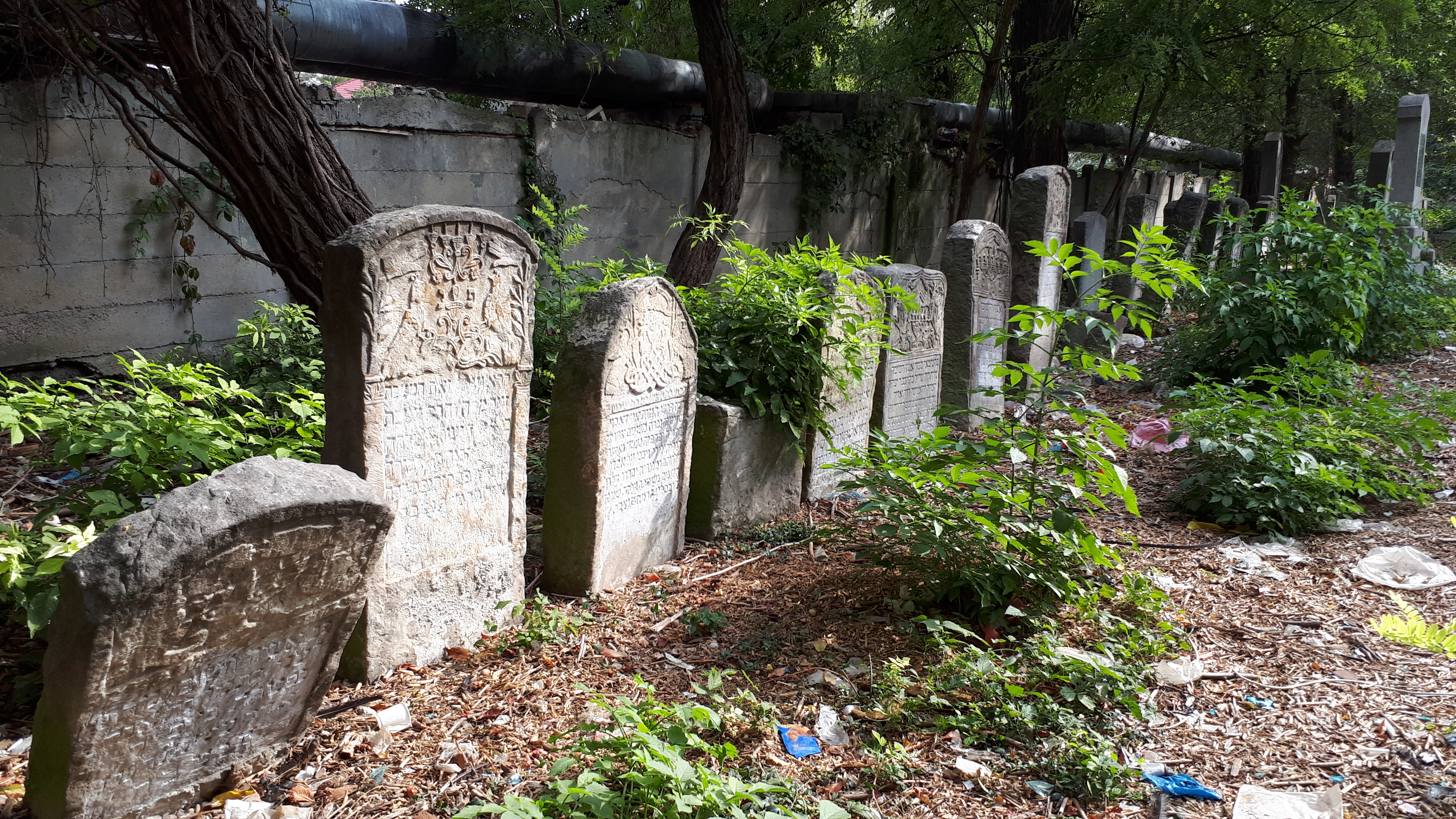
View of the burial ground

The cemetery in October 2017

Gravestones

Another view of the cemetery

== See also ==
- New Jewish Cemetery, Bacău
