= Alexandru Șafran =

Romanian-Swiss rabbi

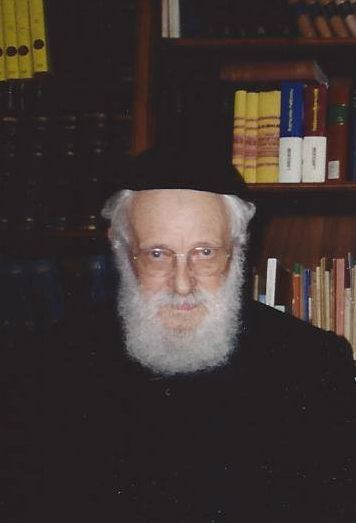
- Șafran in 1994

Personal life
- Born: 12 September 1910 Bacău, Romania
- Died: 27 July 2006 (aged 95) Geneva, Switzerland
- Buried: Israel
- Spouse: Sara Rheinharz
- Children: Esther and Avinoam Shafran
- Parent(s): Betzalel Zeev Safran (1867-1929) and Finkel Rheinharz
- Education: University of Vienna

Religious life
- Religion: Judaism
- Profession: Rabbi, theologian, philosopher, historian

Alexandru Șafran (or Alexandre Safran; 12 September 1910 – 27 July 2006) was a Romanian and, after 1948, Swiss rabbi. As chief rabbi of Romania (1940–1948), he intervened with authorities in the fascist government of Ion Antonescu in an unusually successful attempt to save Jews during the Holocaust.

== Biography ==
Șafran was born in Bacău, and received his doctorate in philosophy from Vienna University (1933). He briefly succeeded his father, Bezalel Ze'ev Șafran, as rabbi in Bacău, before becoming the chief rabbi of Romania in 1940, then the youngest chief rabbi in the world. In September 1940 Romania allied to Nazi Germany and, under Nazi influence, had begun to introduce anti-Jewish laws. In 1941, Șafran and Romania's Union of the Jewish Communities, through intervention with Nicodim Munteanu, the patriarch of the Romanian Orthodox Church, convinced Antonescu to revoke an order forcing Jews to wear the yellow badge.

Shortly thereafter, the government dissolved all Jewish organizations, so Șafran and other Jewish leaders formed an underground Jewish Council. In 1942, Șafran used his contacts with ambassadors (notably the Swiss René de Weck), the queen mother Elena, and church officials, including the papal nuncio Andrea Cassulo, to convince Antonescu to resist German demands for the wholesale deportation of Jews. As World War II continued, the Jewish Council organized efforts to aid and lobby for the return of Jews deported to Transnistria. About 57 percent of Greater Romania's pre-war Jewish population of about 800,000 survived the war.

In 1945 he worked with composer George Enescu to raise relief funds for the Romanian famine, including a United States tour. However, Șafran refused to cooperate with Communist authorities after the war, and, in 1947, was forced into exile in Geneva, Switzerland. In 1948, he became chief rabbi of Geneva, where he remained until his death. There he worked with the United Nations, Red Cross, and other organizations to improve human rights.

He wrote several books including a memoir, Un Tăciune smuls Flăcărilor: Comunitatea Evreiască din România, 1939-47 [Resisting The Storm in English] published in Romanian in 1995. His best known writing is on the Kabbalah.

He was elected an honorary member of the Romanian Academy in 1997. He is buried in Israel beside his wife, Sarah. They had a son, Avinoam, and a daughter, Esther.

== Notes ==
Preceded by Yaakov Yitzhak Neimerov	Chief Rabbi of Romania; 1940–1948	Succeeded by Moses Rosen
