= Damaskinos Papandreou =

Damaskinos Papandreou (Greek: Δαμασκηνός Παπανδρέου) is a Greek name and surname that may refer to three different Orthodox Hierarches:

- Archbishop Damaskinos of Athens (1891–1949), was the Head of the Church of Greece as Archbishop of Athens and All Greece (1941–1949) and the Prime Minister of Greece (1945)
- Damaskinos (Papandreou) of Hadrianpolis (1936–2011), was the Hierarch of the Ecumenical Patriarchate of Constantinople
- Damaskinos (Papandreou) of Johannesburg (born 1957), is the Hierarch of the Greek Orthodox Church of Alexandria
