= Helen of Greece and Denmark =

Queen Mother of Romania (1896–1982)

- Queen Mother of Romania
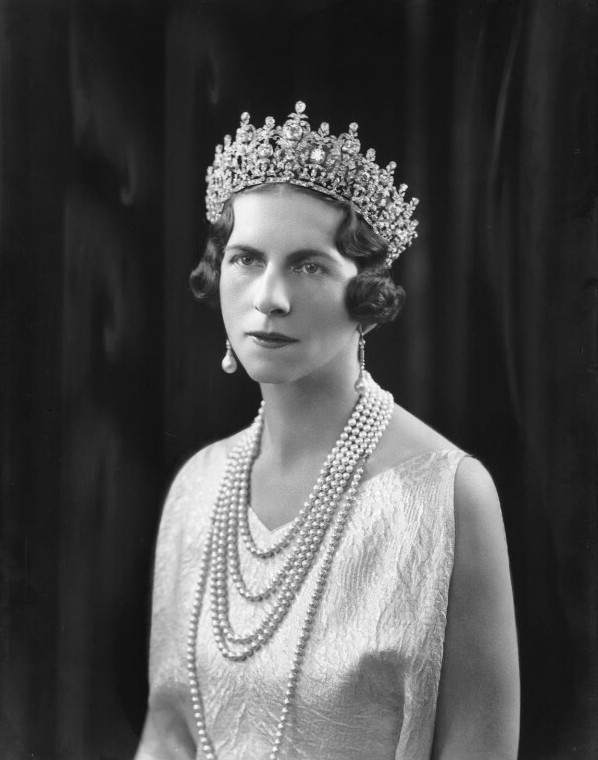
- Photograph by Bassano, 1934
- Born: 2 May 1896; Old Royal Palace, Athens, Greece
- Died: 28 November 1982 (aged 86); Lausanne, Switzerland
- Burial: Bois-de-Vaux Cemetery, Lausanne, Switzerland (1982); The New Archbishopric and Royal Cathedral in Curtea de Argeș, Romania (2019)
- Spouse: Carol, Crown Prince of Romania (later Carol II) (m. 1921; div. 1928)
- Issue: Michael I of Romania
- House: Glücksburg
- Father: Constantine I of Greece
- Mother: Sophia of Prussia
- Religion: Eastern Orthodox Church

Styles of Helen, Queen Mother of Romania
- Reference style: Her Majesty
- Spoken style: Your Majesty

Helen of Greece and Denmark (Greek: Ελένη, romanized: Eléni; Romanian: Elena; 2 May 1896 – 28 November 1982) was the queen mother of Romania during the reign of her son King Michael I (1940–1947). Her humanitarian efforts to save Romanian Jews during World War II led to her being awarded by the State of Israel with the honorific of Righteous Among the Nations in 1993.

Daughter of King Constantine I of Greece and his wife, Princess Sophia of Prussia, Helen spent her childhood in Greece, the United Kingdom and Germany. The outbreak of World War I and the overthrow of her father by the Allies in 1917 permanently marked her and also separated her from her favorite brother, the young Alexander I of Greece. Exiled in Switzerland along with most members of the royal family, Helen then spent several months caring for her father, plagued by disease and depression. In 1920, the princess met Carol, Crown Prince of Romania, who quickly asked her hand in marriage. Despite the bad reputation of the prince, Helen accepted and moved to Romania, where she soon gave birth to their only son, Prince Michael, in 1921.

The situation of her family, however, continued to worry Helen, who made several trips abroad to visit her parents when they did not simply reside with her in Bucharest. In doing this, she distanced herself from her husband, whose multiple affairs ended when he fell in love with Magda Lupescu in 1924. Finally, in 1925, Crown Prince Carol abandoned his wife and renounced the throne in order to live openly with his mistress. Distraught, Helen tried to persuade her husband to return to her but eventually she accepted the divorce in 1928. In the meanwhile, Helen was proclaimed "Queen Mother of Romania" in 1927, as her son Michael ascended to the throne under the regency of his uncle Prince Nicolae. However, the political situation in Romania was complicated and Carol took advantage of the increased instability to return to Bucharest in 1930 and be acclaimed as king. Soon, the new ruler forced his ex-wife into exile and only authorized her to see their son two months per year.

In these circumstances, Helen moved to Villa Sparta at Fiesole, Tuscany. Always close to her family, she hosted her sisters Irene and Katherine and brother Paul, who stayed with her intermittently until the restoration of the Greek monarchy in 1935. The outbreak of World War II, the deposition of Carol II and the subsequent dismemberment of Greater Romania in 1940, however, brought Helen back to be with her son in Bucharest. Subject to the dictatorship of General Antonescu and vigilance of Nazi Germany, the king and his mother were cautious in their dealings with the fascist regime. They did not show their opposition to the participation of Romania in the invasion of the Soviet Union and the deportation of Jews. Finally, King Michael organized a coup against Antonescu on 23 August 1944 and Romania turned against the Axis powers; however, the country was, in the end, occupied by the Red Army.

For Helen and her son, the post-war period was marked by the interference of the Soviet Union in Romanian political life. In March 1945, the king was forced to accept a communist government headed by Petru Groza while the following year, the rigged general elections confirmed the hegemony of the PCR in the country. Finally, Michael I was forced to abdicate on 30 December 1947 and the royal family took the path of exile. She then returned to the Villa Sparta, where she divided her time among her family, gardening and the study of Italian art. Increasingly concerned about her finances, Helen finally left Italy for Switzerland in 1979 and died three years later with her son at her side.

== Princess of Greece and Denmark ==
=== A Greek childhood ===
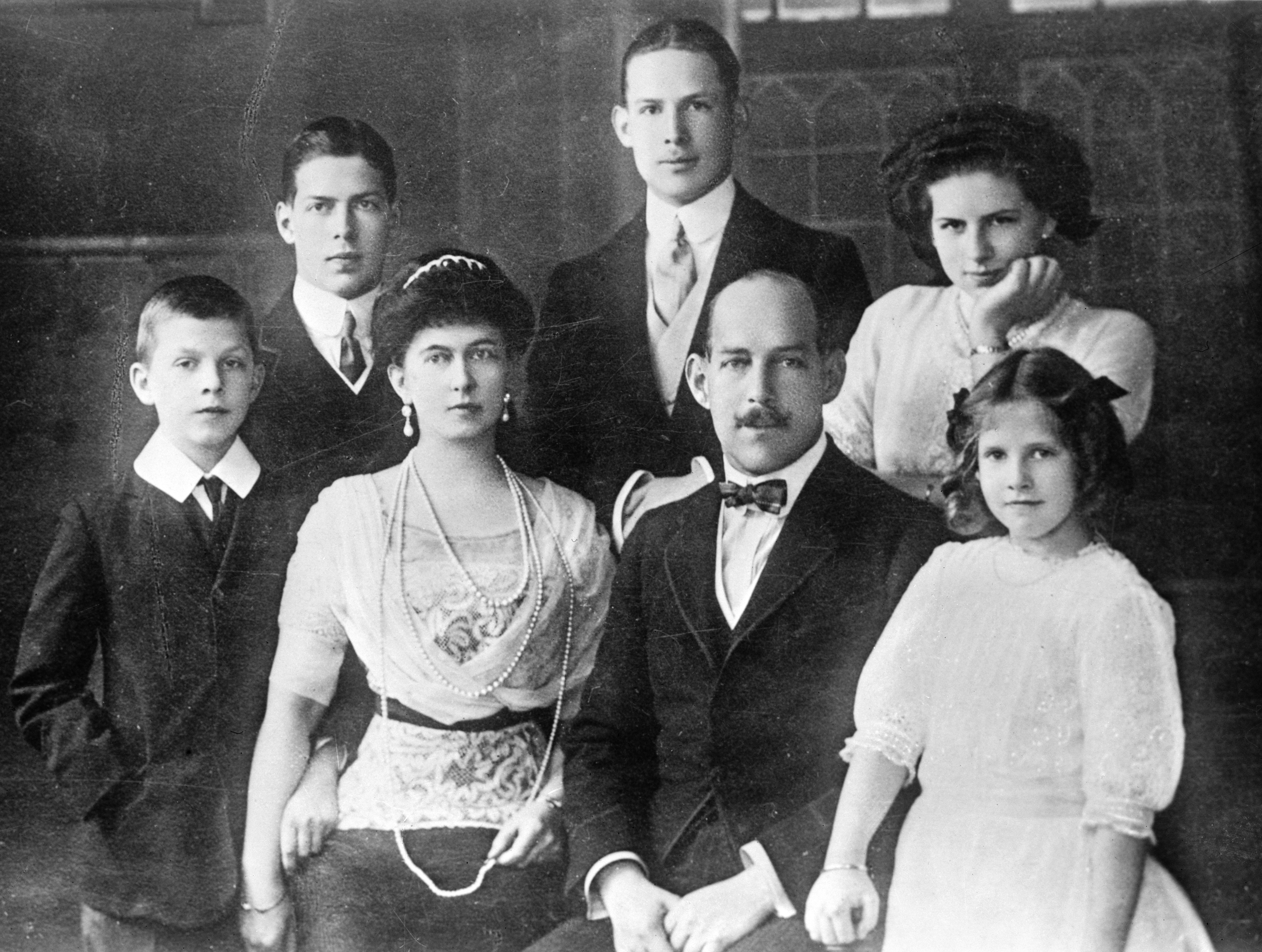
Greek Royal Family in 1914. King Constantine I and Queen Sophia surrounded by their five older children (from left to right): Paul, Alexander, George, Helen and Irene.

The third child and eldest daughter of Crown Prince Constantine of Greece and Princess Sophia of Prussia, Helen was born on 2 May 1896 in Athens during the reign of her grandfather, King George I. From birth, she received the nickname "Sitta" as her brother Alexander failed to correctly pronounce the English word "sister". Growing up, Helen developed a special affection for Alexander, only three years her senior.

Helen spent most of her childhood in the Greek capital. Every summer, the princess and her family travelled to the Hellenic Mediterranean aboard the royal yacht Amphitrite or visited Sophia's mother, the Dowager Empress Victoria in Germany. From the age of 8, Helen began to spend part of the summer in Great Britain, in the regions of Seaford and Eastbourne. The princess grew up in a strongly anglophile environment, among a cohort of British tutors and governesses, including Miss Nichols, who took special care of her.

=== From the Goudi coup to the Balkan Wars ===
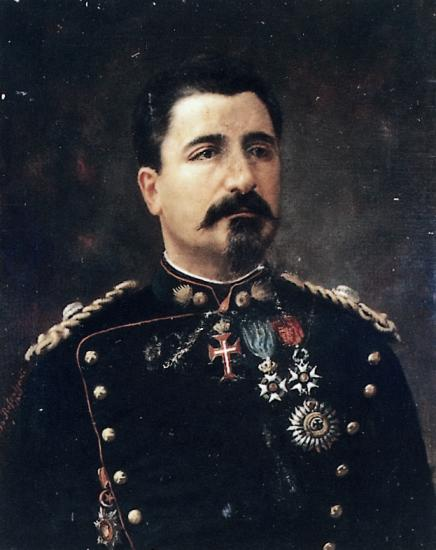
Artillery Major Nikolaos Zorbas, figurehead leader of the Goudi coup. Portrait by Spyridon Prosalentis.

On 28 August 1909 a group of Greek officers, known as the "Military League", organized a coup d'état (called the Goudi coup) against the government of King George I, Helen's grandfather. While declaring to be monarchists, the League members, led by Nikolaos Zorbas, asked the king to dismiss his sons from military posts. Officially, this was to protect the Diadochos (Crown Prince) from the jealousy that could stem from his friendship with some soldiers. But the reality was quite different: the officers blamed Constantine for the defeat of Greece against the Ottoman Empire during the Thirty Days' War of 1897.

The situation was so tense that the sons of George I were finally forced to resign from their military posts to save their father from the shame of their being expelled. The Diadochos also decided to leave Greece with his wife and children. For several months, the family moved to the Schloss Friedrichshof at Kronberg in Germany. It was the first of many times that the 14-year-old Helen would have to go into exile.

After much tension, the political situation eventually subsided in Greece and Constantine and his family were allowed to return to their homeland. In 1911, the Diadochos was restored in his military duties by the Prime Minister Eleftherios Venizelos. A year later, the First Balkan War broke out, which allowed Greece to annex large territories in Macedonia, Epirus, Crete and the North Aegean. It was also at the end of this conflict that King George I was assassinated in Thessaloniki on 18 March 1913 and Helen's father succeeded him on the Hellenic throne as King Constantine I.

After these events, Helen spent long weeks touring Greece, of which she previously only knew the main towns and the island of Corfu. With her father and brother Alexander, she travelled in Greek Macedonia and the various battlefields of the First Balkan War. However, this period of calm was short-lived as the Second Balkan War broke out in June 1913. Once again, Greece emerged victorious from the conflict, allowing it to significantly expand its territory, which grew by 68% after the signing of the Treaty of Bucharest.

=== World War I ===
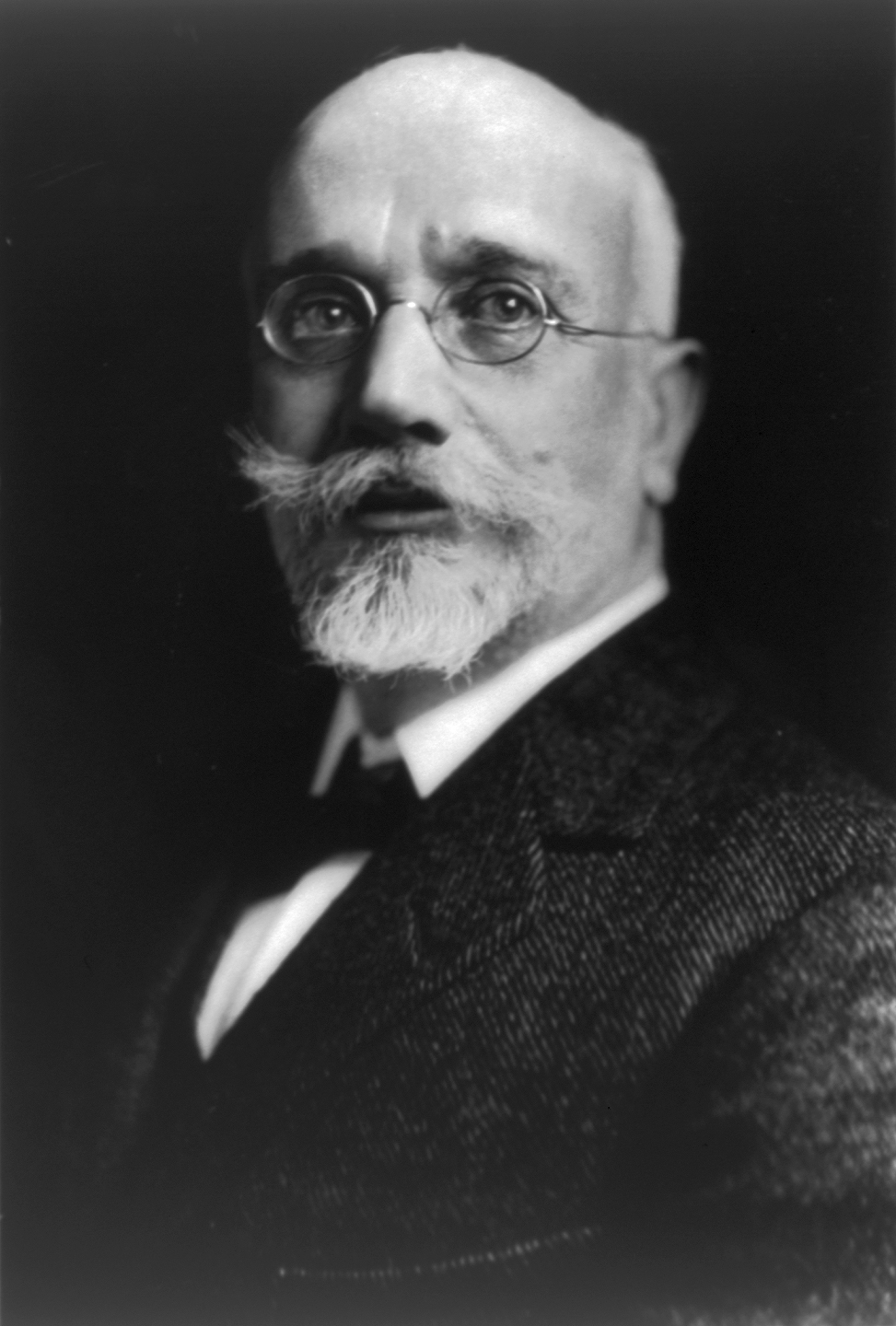
Greek Prime Minister Eleftherios Venizelos

During World War I, King Constantine I first sought to maintain Greece in a position of neutrality. He considered that his country was not yet ready to participate in a new conflict after the Balkan Wars. But, educated in Germany and linked to Emperor William II (who was his brother-in-law), Constantine I was quickly accused of supporting the Triple Alliance and wishing for the defeat of the Allies. The king quickly fell out with his Prime Minister Venizelos, who was convinced of the need to support the countries of the Triple Entente to fulfill the so-called Megali Idea. In October 1916, Venizelos, protected by the Entente countries, and in particular by the French Republic, formed a parallel government in Thessaloniki. Central Greece was occupied by the allied forces and the country was soon in the middle of a civil war, the so-called National Schism.

Weakened by all these tensions, Constantine I became seriously ill in 1915. Suffering from pleurisy aggravated by a pneumonia, he remained in bed for several weeks and nearly died. In Greece, public opinion was affected by the rumor, spread by Venizelists, that the king was not sick but that Queen Sophia in fact injured him in the course of an argument where she tried to force him to fight alongside the emperor. The health of the sovereign declined so much, that a ship was sent to the Island of Tinos in order to seek the miraculous Icon of the Virgin and Child, which was supposed to heal the sick. After kissing the holy picture, the king partially recovered his health. But the situation remained worrying and the king was in need of surgery before he could reassume his duties. These events had a special impact on Princess Helen, who was very close to her father: impressed by his recovery, she developed a deep religiosity, a trait that she would retain throughout her life.

Despite these difficulties, Constantine I refused to change his policies and was faced with the increasingly clear opposition of the Triple Entente and Venizelists. Thus, on 1 December 1916 the so-called Greek Vespers took place where the Allied soldiers fought against Greek reservists in Athens and the French fleet bombarded the Royal Palace. On this occasion, Helen was nearly killed by a gunfire from the Zappeion. After hearing the gunshots and worried for the life of her father, the princess ran to the gardens of the royal palace but was saved by the royal Garde du Corps which took her back inside the palace.

Finally, on 10 June 1917, Charles Jonnart, the Allied High Commissioner in Greece, asked the king for his abdication. Under the threat of an invasion in Piraeus, the king agreed and went into exile, but without formally abdicating. The Allies did not wish to establish a Republic in Greece, so one of the members of the royal family had to stay and succeed him. Because the Diadochos George was also considered pro-German like his father, they wanted someone considered malleable, as a puppet ruler of Constantine I's enemies. Finally the younger brother of the Diadochos, Prince Alexander, was chosen by Venizelos and the Triple Entente as the new king.

== From exile to the Romanian wedding ==
=== Life in Switzerland ===
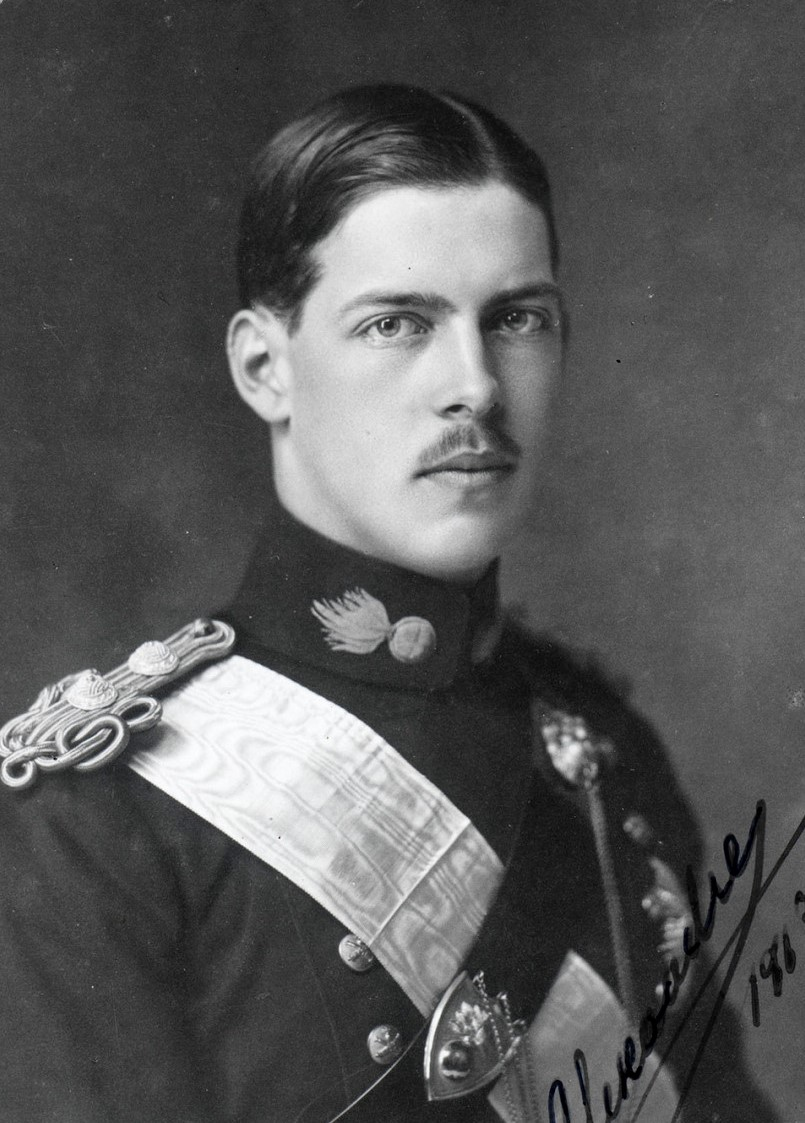
Alexander I of Greece, c. 1917

On 11 June 1917 the Greek royal family secretly fled from their palace, surrounded by a loyalist mob that refused to see them go. In the days that followed, Constantine I, Queen Sophia and five of their children left Greece from the port of Oropos and took the road to exile. This was the last time that Helen saw her favorite brother. In fact, on their return to power, the Venizelists prohibited any contact between King Alexander I and the rest of the royal family.

After crossing the Ionian Sea and Italy, Helen and her family settled in Switzerland, mainly among the cities of St. Moritz, Zürich and Lucerne. In exile, Helen's parents were soon followed by almost all members of the royal family, who left their country with the return of Venizelos as Prime Minister and the entry of Greece to the war alongside the Triple Entente. However, the financial position of the royal family was precarious and Constantine I, haunted by a deep sense of failure, soon fell ill. In 1918, he contracted Spanish flu and again was close to death.

Very concerned about the fate of their father, Helen and her sisters Irene and Katherine spent a long time with him to distract him from his worries. Helen also sought to reconnect with Alexander I. She tried to take advantage of the visit of her brother to Paris in 1919 to call him by phone. However, the officer who escorted the king in the French capital refused to pass along either her communications or those of other members of the royal family (with the exception of his aunt Princess Maria of Greece and Denmark).

=== Meeting with Crown Prince Carol of Romania ===
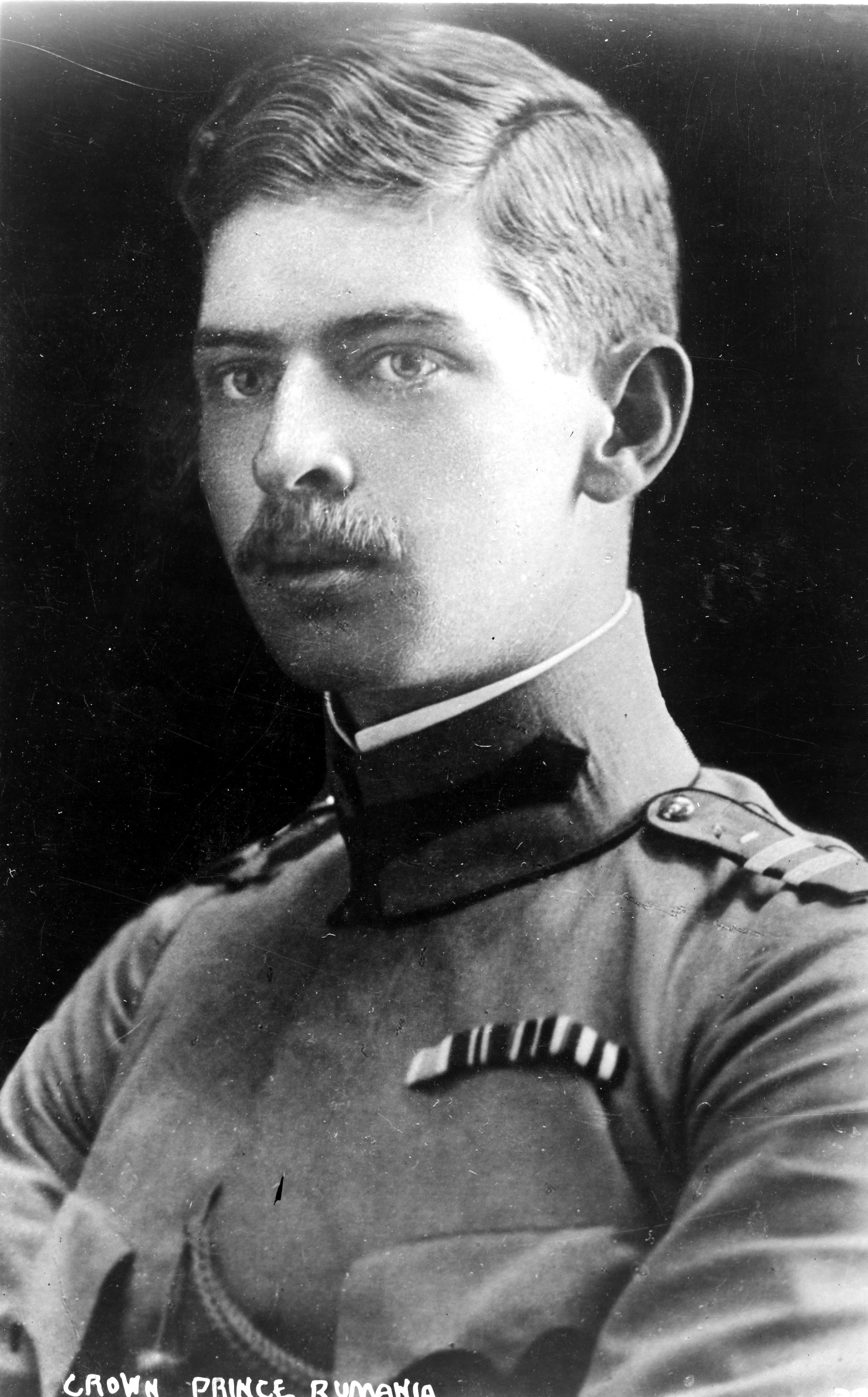
Crown Prince Carol of Romania, c. 1915

In 1920, the Greek exiles were visited in Lucerne by Queen Marie of Romania (Sophia's first cousin (Note: Queen Sophia of Greece was a daughter of Victoria, Dowager Empress of Germany and Queen Marie of Romania was a daughter of Prince Alfred, Duke of Edinburgh, the German Empress' younger brother.)) and her daughters Elisabeth, Maria and Ileana. Worried about the future of her eldest and still single son, the Diadochos George, who had already proposed to Princess Elisabeth a few years earlier, Queen Sophia was anxious for him to marry. Homeless, penniless and without any real political value since his exclusion from the Greek throne in 1917, Helen's elder brother reiterated his request of marriage to Princess Elisabeth, who, despite her initial reticence, finally decided to accept. Pleased with the union, the Queen of Romania then invited her future son-in-law and his sisters Helen and Irene to go to Bucharest in order to publicly announce the royal engagement. The princesses accepted and the departure was set to 2 October. In the meanwhile, another member of the Romanian royal family arrived in Lucerne. This was Elisabeth's brother, the Crown Prince Carol, who had just completed a trip around the world which he had undertaken in order to forget his morganatic wife Zizi Lambrino and their son Carol. (Note: In 1918, in the middle of World War I, Carol deserted the Romanian army to marry his mistress in Odessa. This anti-constitutional marriage was then broken by the Romanian justice and Carol had to give up his wife to resume his functions as heir to the throne.)

In Romania George, Helen and Irene were received with pomp by the royal family. Housed at Pelișor Castle, they were a central part of the celebrations for the return of Crown Prince Carol to his country (10 October) and the announcement of the engagement of Elisabeth with the Diadochos (12 October). The stay of the Greek princesses, however, was brief. On 24 October, a telegram arrived which announced the death in Zurich of the Dowager Duchess of Saxe-Coburg-Gotha, who was the mother of the queen of Romania. The very next day, another message arrived informing the Greek princesses that Alexander I had suddenly died in Athens, following a monkey bite.

Under these circumstances, the three Greek princesses and Queen Marie of Romania decided to make an emergency return to Switzerland. Moved by the situation and probably pushed by his mother, Crown Prince Carol at the last moment decided to travel along with them. After being cold and distant to Helen during her stay at Romania, the crown prince suddenly turned very attentive to the princess. During the train journey, the two told their life stories to each other and Carol confided in Helen about his affair with Zizi Lambrino. Helen likewise told him of her life and of family matters, including her great grief for her brother Alexander's death and how she did not want to return to Greece now that her only real friend, her beloved brother, was dead. This opening of the hearts to each other had the result that Helen fell in love with the heir to the Romanian throne.

=== Restoration and marriage ===
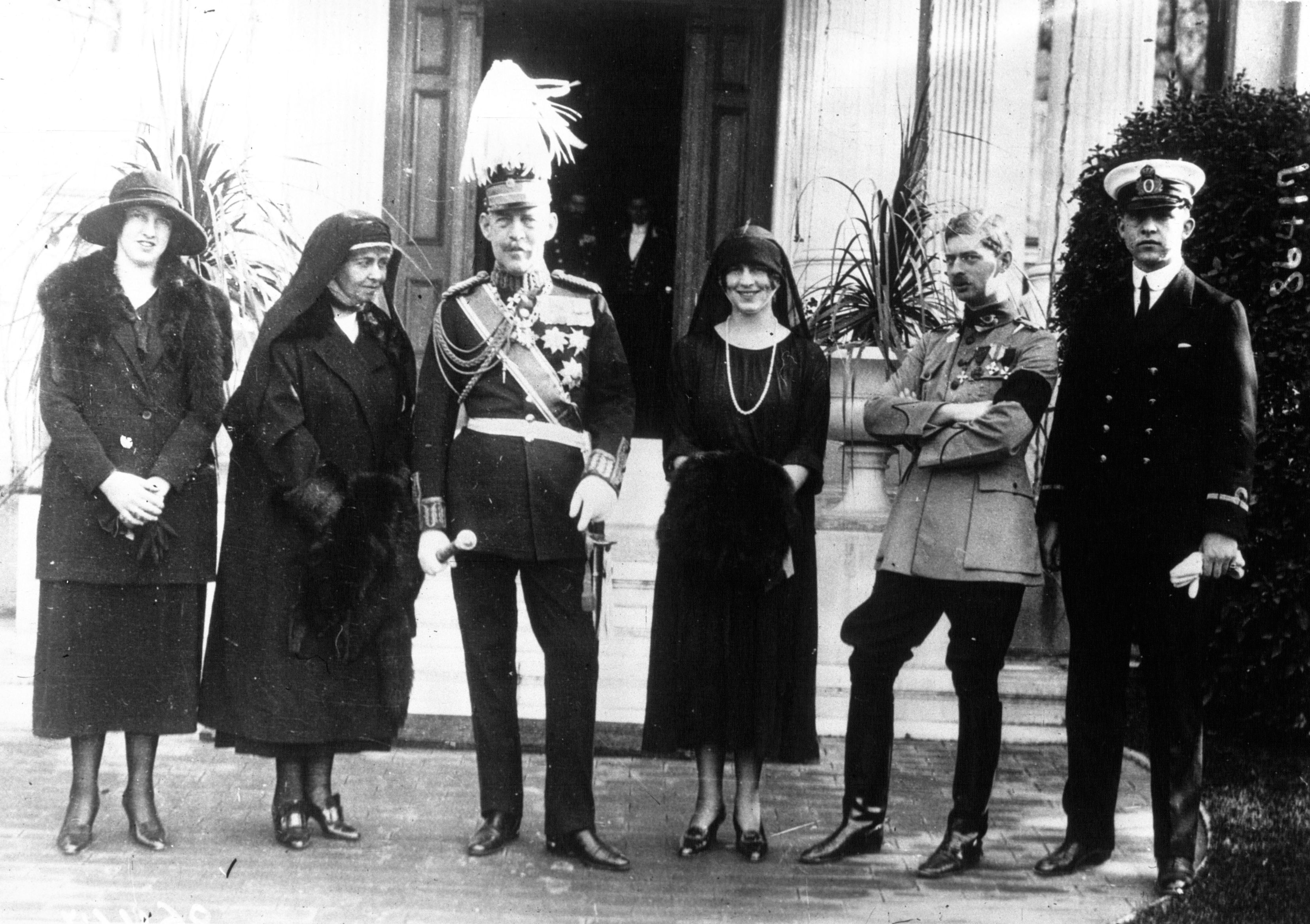
The Greek royal family in 1921. From left to right: Princess Irene, Queen Sophia, King Constantine I, Crown Princess Helen, Crown Prince Carol of Romania, and Prince Paul.

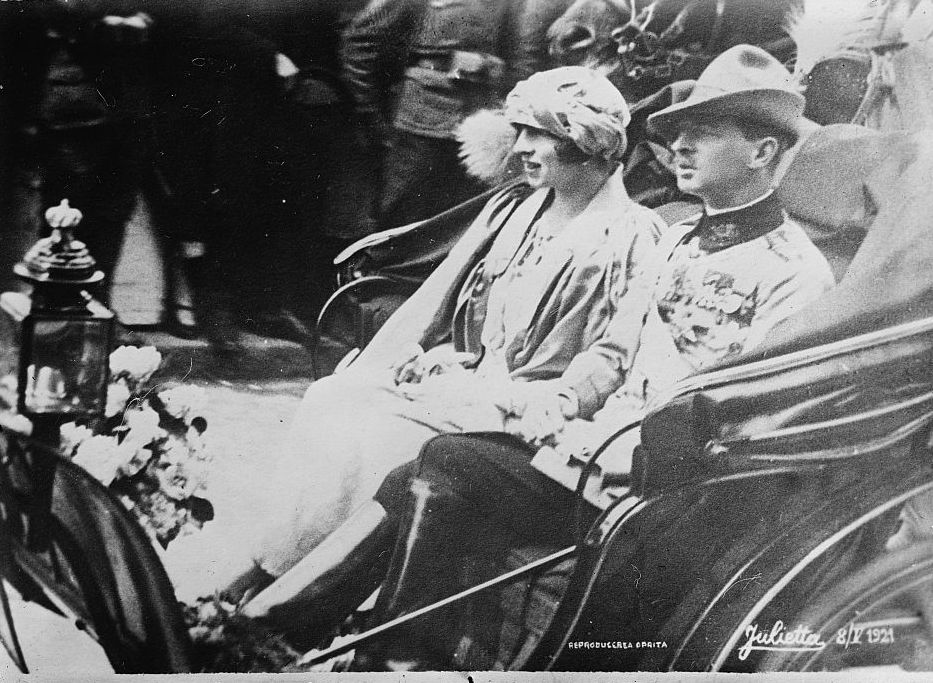
Crown Princess Helen and Crown Prince Carol of Romania, 1921

Soon after their arrival in Switzerland, Crown Prince Carol asked for Helen's hand in marriage, much to the joy of the queen of Romania, but not to the princess' parents. Helen was determined to accept the marriage proposal, therefore King Constantine I assented to the engagement, but only after the marriage of Carol and Zizi Lambrino could be quickly dissolved. For her part, Queen Sophia was much less favorable to her daughter's wedding. Having no confidence in the Romanian crown prince, she tried to convince Helen to reject the proposal. However, Helen insisted, and despite the doubts of her mother, the engagement was announced in Zürich in November 1920.

Meanwhile, in Greece, the Venizelists lost the election in favor of Constantine I's supporters on 14 November 1920. Desiring to resolve the dynastic question, on 5 December the new cabinet organized a referendum, the disputed results of which showed that 99% of the population demanded the restoration of the sovereign. Under these conditions, the royal family returned to Athens and Helen was accompanied by her fiancé on her return. For two months, the two traveled discovering inner Greece and its ancient ruins. They then went to Bucharest to attend the wedding of Diadochos George with Elisabeth of Romania (27 February 1921) before returning to Athens to celebrate their own wedding in the Metropolitan Cathedral on 10 March 1921. Being the first Greek princess to marry in Athens, Helen wore the Romanian 'Greek Key' tiara, a gift from her mother-in-law. The newlyweds then spent their honeymoon in Tatoi, where they remained for two months before returning to Romania, on 8 May 1921.

== Crown Princess of Romania ==
=== Installation in Bucharest ===
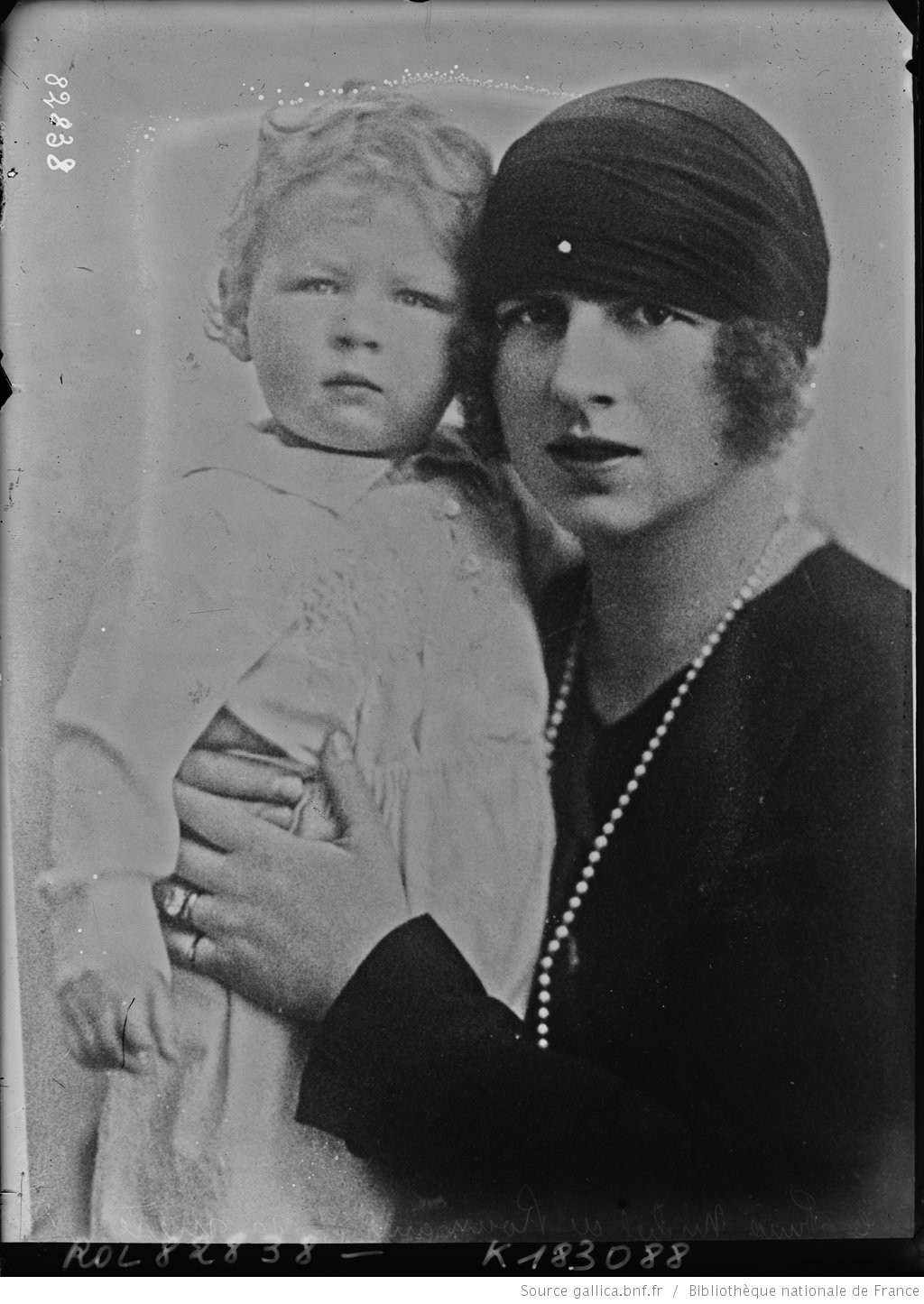
Helen, Crown Princess of Romania and her son Prince Michael, 1922

Upon her return to Romania, Helen was already pregnant. She spent some time with Carol at the Cotroceni Palace, where the pomp and protocol of the Court both impressed and bored her at the same time. The couple then took up residence at the Foișor, an elegant Swiss-style chalet built in the surroundings of Peleș Castle, at Sinaia. It was there that the crown princess gave birth after only seven and a half months after her wedding. Her only child, Prince Michael, named in honor to Michael the Brave, the first unifier of the Danubian Principalities, was born on 25 October 1921; the childbirth was difficult and required surgery. The ordeal significantly weakened Helen, and the doctors forbade her from having a second pregnancy.

Once Helen had recovered, in December 1921 the couple moved to Bucharest, in a large villa at the Șoseaua Kiseleff. Despite their significantly different points of interest, Carol and Helen managed, for some time, to lead a bourgeois and happy existence. In the mornings, the heir performed his official duties and in the afternoons, they enjoyed their favorite pastimes. While the crown prince engaged in reading and his stamp collections, she spent her time engaged in horseback riding or on the decoration of their residences. The crown princess was very involved in social work and founded a nursing school in the capital. She was also appointed an Honorary Colonel of the 9th Cavalry Regiment, the Roșiori.

=== Reunion with family ===
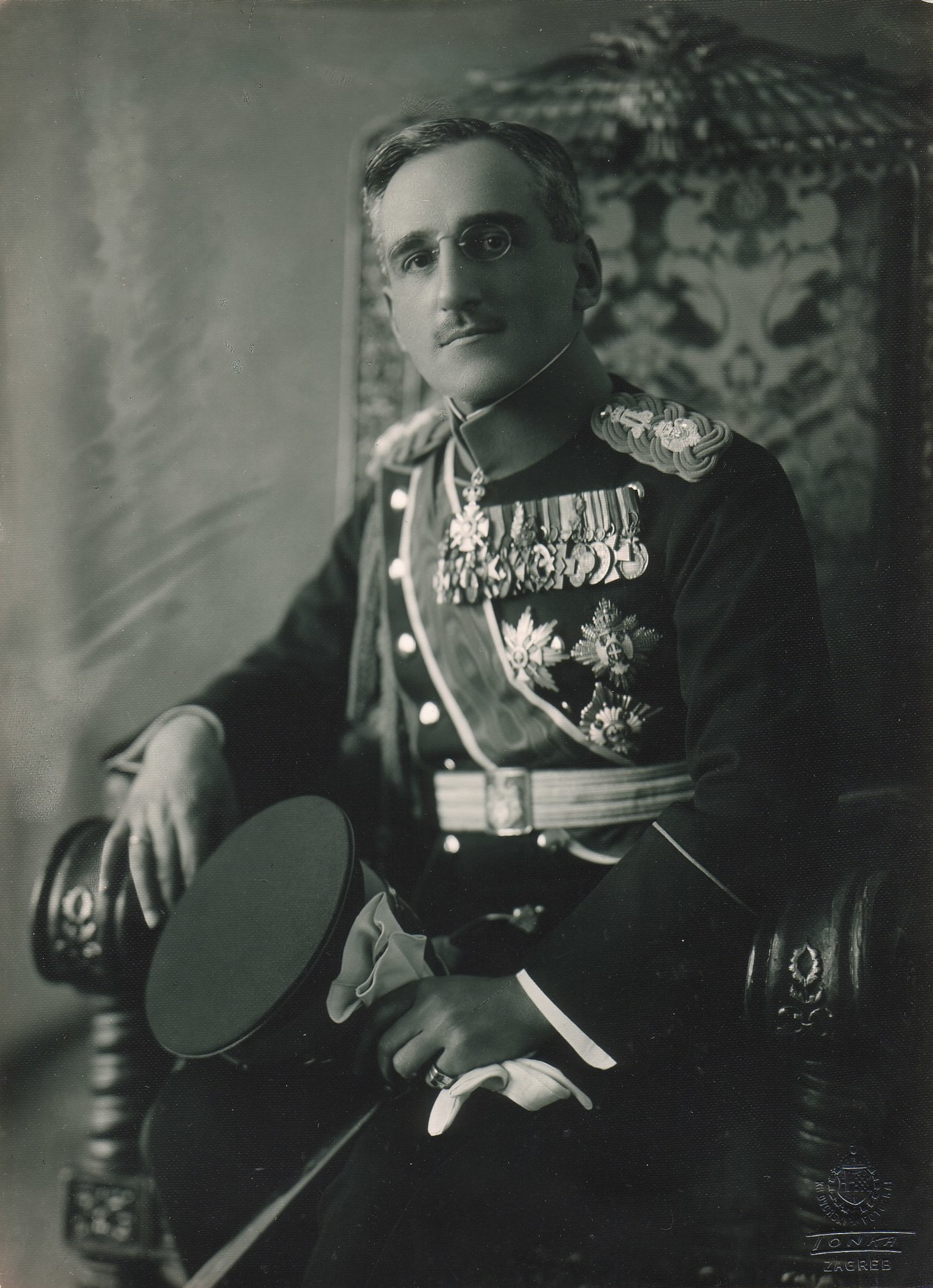
King Alexander I of Yugoslavia

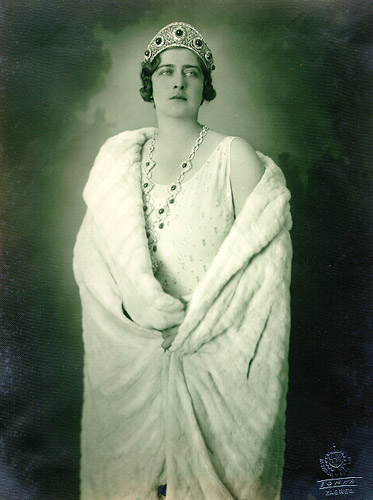
Queen Maria of Yugoslavia, born princess of Romania

In the meantime, the political situation was deteriorating in Greece. The Hellenic Kingdom endured a period of unrest during the Greco-Turkish War, and by 1919 the health of King Constantine I was deteriorating once again. Worried about the future of her father, Helen asked for her husband's permission to return to Greece. The couple and their child thus left for Athens at the end of January 1922. But while Carol left Greece in February to attend the betrothal of his sister Maria to King Alexander I of Yugoslavia, Helen remained with her parents until April, when she returned to Romania, bringing her sister Irene. By that time, the crown prince had resumed his affair with his former mistress, the actress Mirella Marcovici.

In June 1922, Carol and Helen went to Belgrade with the whole Romanian royal family to attend the wedding of Alexander I and Maria. Back in Bucharest, the crown princess then resumed her role as wife of the heir to the throne. She participated in official acts and supported the sovereign and her husband during ceremonies that punctuated the life of the monarchy. Like many women of her rank, Helen was also interested in social works. Nevertheless, she continued to be worried for her family, and even visited her sister Irene, her aunt Maria and her Greek cousins in an futile attempt to console herself about the remoteness of her parents.

In September 1922, a military coup forced King Constantine I to abdicate in favor of his son George II, and to go into exile. Without any real power and dominated by the revolutionaries, after a failed coup of a pro-royalist group (the so-called Leonardopoulos–Gargalidis coup d'état) in October 1923, the new sovereign in turn was forced to abdicate after only fifteen months of reign. Devastated by these events, Helen immediately went to Italy to be with her parents in their exile. Shortly after the coronation of King Ferdinand I and Queen Marie of Romania in Alba Iulia on 15 October 1922, Helen left for Palermo, where she remained until the death of her father, on 11 January 1923.

Bored by the absence of his wife, Carol finally invited his mother-in-law to stay in Bucharest. However, the dowager queen did not arrive alone: with her, and without warning, came no fewer than 15 Greek princes and princesses, to his home. Increasingly irritated by the invasive presence of his wife's family, Carol also was hurt by Helen's attitude because she refused to fulfil her marital duties. Jealous, the crown prince suspected that his wife had begun an affair with the charming Prince Amedeo of Savoy, Duke of Aosta, a regular guest of the Greek royal couple in Sicily. It was due to these circumstances that Helen and Carol began their separation, though the crown princess saved appearances by devoting more time to the education of her son, Prince Michael.

=== Abandonment of Crown Prince Carol ===
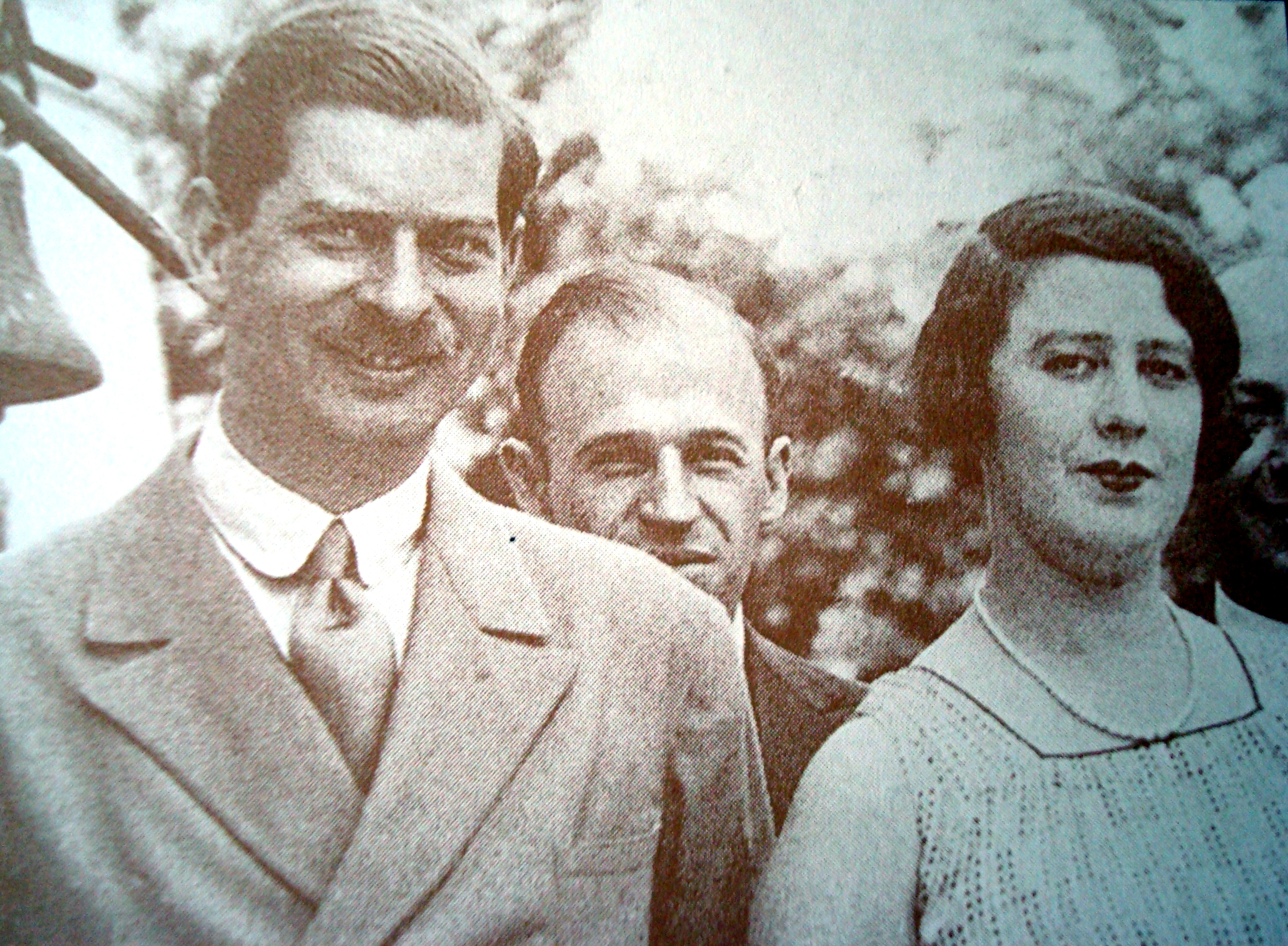
Crown Prince Carol of Romania and Magda Lupescu

In the summer of 1924, Carol met Elena Lupescu (better known under the name of "Magda" Lupescu), with whom he began an affair in or around 14 February 1925. This was not the first extramarital relationship of the crown prince since his marriage. However, for Carol, this time there was a serious bond, a fact that would soon worry not only Helen (always of a conciliatory and tolerant disposition with her husband's infidelities) but also the rest of the Romanian royal family, which feared that Lupescu could turn into a new Zizi Lambrino. In November 1925, Carol was sent to the United Kingdom to represent the royal family at the funeral of the Dowager Queen Alexandra. Despite several promises made to his father, King Ferdinand I, he took advantage of traveling abroad to find his mistress and openly live out their relationship. Refusing to return to Bucharest, Carol finally officially renounced the throne and prerogatives as crown prince on 28 December 1925.

In Romania, Helen was distraught by Carol's attitude, especially as Queen Marie made her partly responsible for the failure of her marriage. The crown princess wrote to her husband to convince him to return. She also attempted to convince politicians to delay Carol's exclusion to the royal succession and proposed to her in-laws that she herself take a trip to meet with her husband. However, the Prime Minister Ion Brătianu, who despised the crown prince because of his sympathy to the National Peasants' Party, categorically opposed. The head of government even accelerated the exclusion procedures by summoning both Houses of the Parliament to register the act of renunciation and appoint little Prince Michael as the new heir to the throne.

On 4 January 1926, the Romanian Parliament ratified the acceptance of Carol's renunciation and a royal ordinance was issued giving Helen the title princess of Romania; in addition, she was included in the Civil list, a privilege previously reserved to the sovereign and the heir to the throne. After King Ferdinand I was diagnosed with cancer, a Regency Council was also formed during Michael's minority with Prince Nicholas as the Head, assisted by Patriarch Miron and the magistrate Gheorghe Buzdugan, replaced after his death in 1929 by Constantine Sărățeanu. Despite this, Helen continued to hope for the return of her husband and obstinately refused requests for a divorce that he sent to her from abroad.

In June 1926, shortly before the death of her father-in-law, Helen went to Italy to attend the funeral of her paternal grandmother, Dowager Queen Olga of Greece, and moved with her mother to the Villa Bobolina in Fiesole. The princess took advantage of her stay in Italy and to try to arrange for an encounter with her husband but, having initially agreeing to see her, Carol canceled the meeting at the last minute.

== First reign of Michael I and Italian exile ==
In the spring of 1927, Queen Marie made an official visit to the United States. During her absence, Helen and her sister-in-law Elisabeth took care of King Ferdinand I, whose health declined rapidly. The king died on 20 July 1927 at Peleș Castle and his 5-year-old grandson succeeded him under the name of Michael I while the Regency Council took over the direction of the country. However, in Romania, Carol retained many supporters (soon nicknamed "Carlists") and the National Liberal Party began to fear the return of the Prince.

After trying to convince her husband to go to Bucharest, Helen gradually changed her attitude towards him. Anxious to preserve the rights of her son and probably convinced by Prime Minister Barbu Știrbey, the princess requested a divorce, (Note: According to Ivor Porter, the change of Helen was partly due to Carol's letter to her family where he accuses his wife to have had a lover before their marriage.) which she easily obtained. On 21 June 1928, the marriage was dissolved by the Romanian Supreme Court on the grounds of incompatibility. Helen also distanced herself from her mother-in-law, who complained of being separated from the young king and criticized more openly the Greek entourage of the Princess. Under these circumstances, the dowager queen approached her eldest son and built ties with the Carlist movement.

After the Regency Council failed to govern the country, Carol appeared increasingly as a providential man who could solve the problems of Romania. Still, his supporters (as Prime Minister Iuliu Maniu, leader of the National Peasants' Party) continued to demand his separation from Magda Lupescu and his reconciliation with Helen, which he refused. Thanks to his many supporters in the country, the prince finally organized his return to Bucharest on the night of 6–7 June 1930. Joyfully welcomed by the population and the political class, he then proclaimed himself king under the name of Carol II.

=== Impossible reconciliation with Carol II ===
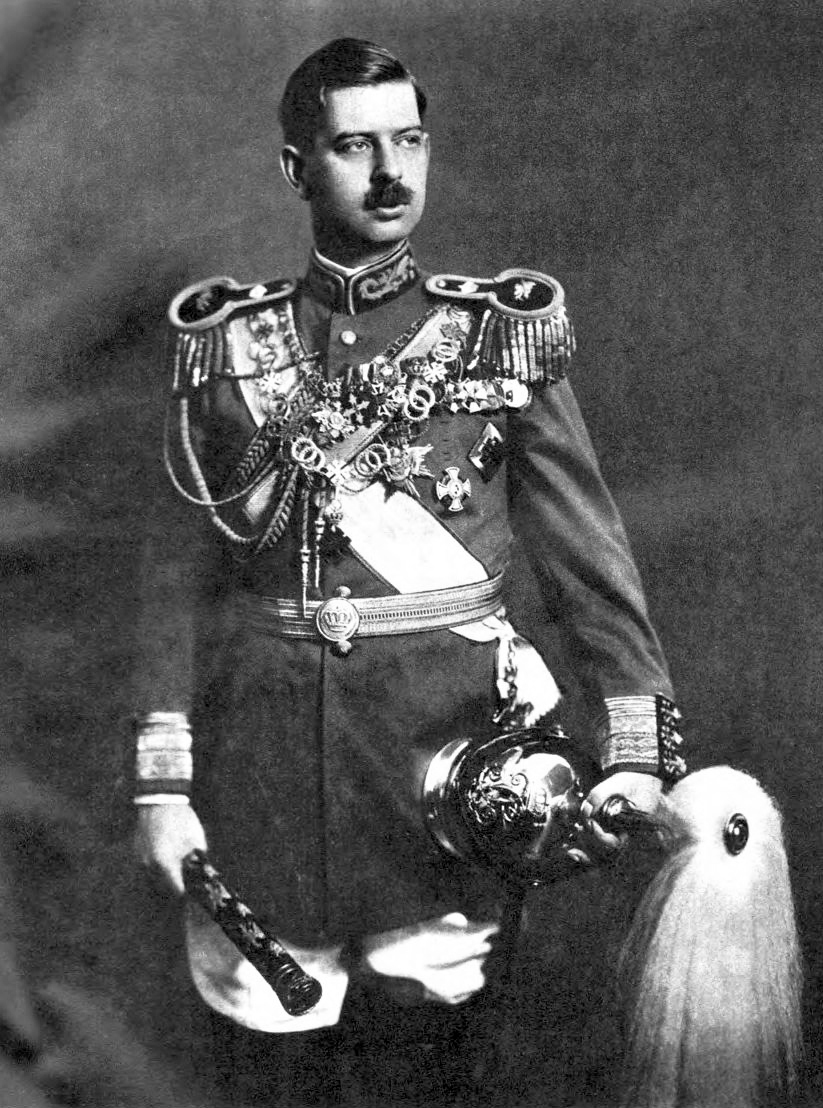
King Carol II of Romania, 1930

When he came to power, Carol II initially refused to see Helen though he expressed his desire to meet his son, demoted to the rank of heir-apparent to the throne with the title of Grand Voivod of Alba Iulia by the Romanian Parliament (8 June 1930). In order to be reunited with Michael, the king therefore resolved to meet his former wife. Accompanied by his brother Nicholas and his sister Elizabeth, he visited the princess in her villa in the Șoseaua Kiseleff. At the sight of her former husband, Helen showed coldness but she had no other alternative than to offer him her friendship for the sake of their child.

In the following weeks, Helen suffered the combined pressures of politicians and the Romanian Orthodox Church, who were trying to persuade her to resume her conjugal life with Carol II and accept to be crowned along with him at a ceremony in Alba Iulia, scheduled on 21 September 1930. Despite her reluctance, the princess agreed to a reconciliation and reconsidered the annulment of her divorce, but under the condition of having a separate residence. These were the circumstances under which the former spouses lived and while Carol II sometimes went to Helen for lunch with her, the princess would, from time to time, have tea with him in the royal palace. In July, the king, his former wife and son traveled together in Sinaia but while Carol II moved to Foișor, Helen and Michael stayed at Peleș Castle. Each day, the family gathered for tea and, on 20 July, Carol II and Helen appeared publicly together on the occasion of a ceremony in memory of King Ferdinand I.

In August 1930, the government presented a decree to Carol II for his signature officially confirming Helen as Her Majesty, the Queen of Romania. The king, however, crossed this out and declared Helen to be Her Majesty Helen (i.e. with the style Majesty, but not the title Queen). Helen refused to allow anyone to use this style in her presence. Due to these circumstances, the proposed coronation of the two former spouses was postponed. The return of Magda Lupescu to Romania finally put an end to the reconciliation efforts of the pair. Soon the king was able to get Michael moved to his side, and Helen was allowed to see her son every day in exchange for her political silence. Increasingly isolated, the princess was forced into exile by her former husband, she consented to a separation agreement in October 1931. In exchange for her silence, and through the mediation of her brother, the former King George II of Greece, and her sister-in-law Elisabeth, (Note: According to Ivor Porter, was King Alexander I of Yugoslavia who mediated between the couple in 1931 but Princess Elisabeth took over the task in 1932.) Helen then obtained a substantial monetary compensation. With the approval of Carol II, she obtained the right to stay four months a year in Romania and to receive her son abroad during two months of the year. She retained her residence in Bucharest and the king agreed to fund its maintenance during his absence. Especially, Helen received a sum of thirty million lei to buy a home abroad and in addition she obtained an annual pension of seven million lei.

=== Between scandal and exile ===
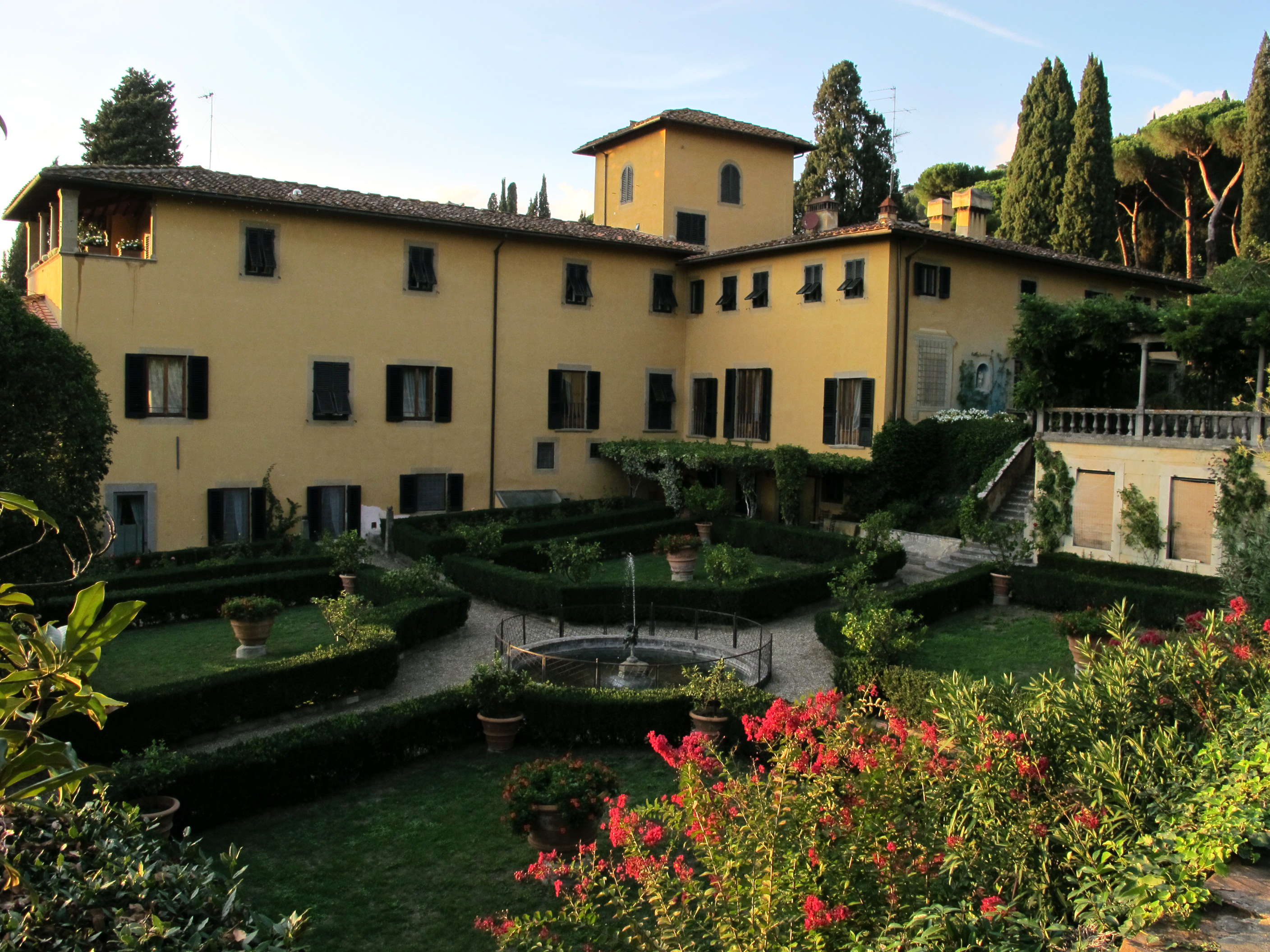
Villa Sparta, in Fiesole, where Helen lived more than 30 years

In November 1931, Helen left Romania for Germany, where she went to the bedside of her mother, the Dowager Queen Sophia of Greece, seriously ill with cancer. After her death on 13 January 1932, Helen bought her house in Fiesole, Tuscany, which she used as her main residence. In this large house, that she renamed Villa Sparta, the princess received the visit of her sisters Irene and Katherine and her brother Paul, who remained with Helen on long stays.

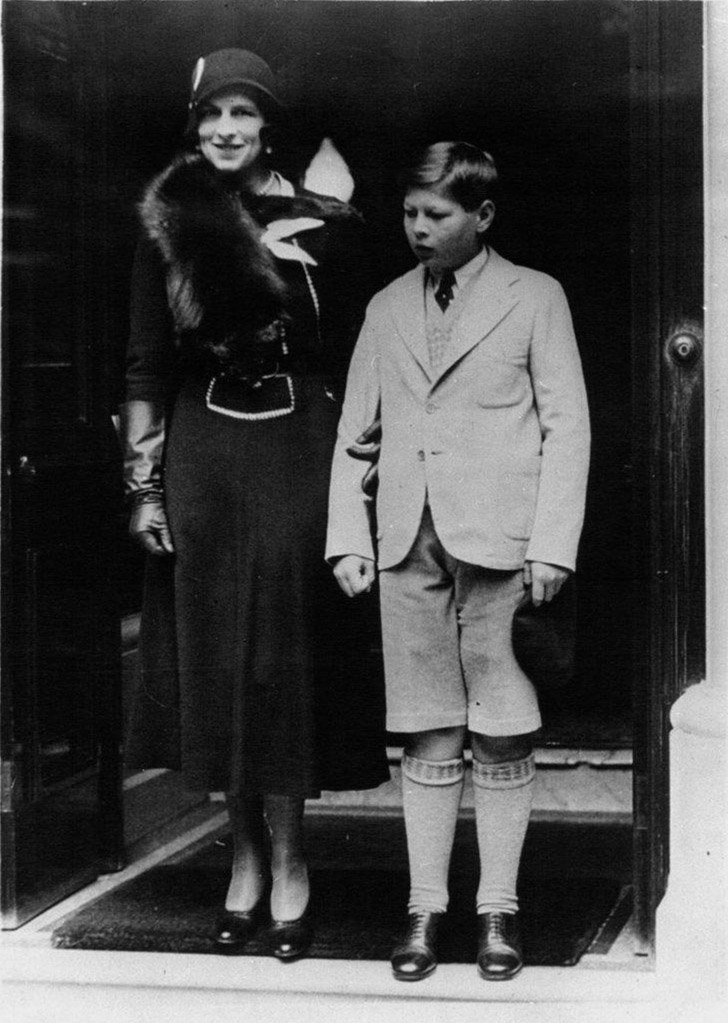
Princess Helen and her son Crown Prince Michael during their visit in London, 1932

Despite the distance, the friction between Helen and Carol II continued. In September 1932, a visit from Michael and his mother to the United Kingdom was used by Helen as an opportunity for a new, very public conflict, which soon made the headlines of the international press, just as Helen wanted. The king wanted the crown prince not to wear shorts in public, and that he not be photographed in the company of his mother. Helen was incensed at the second stipulation and, as was her wont, took the trouble to aggravate the situation by defying the first stipulation as well. She made sure her son was dressed in shorts and posed for the cameras with him at her side for an extended photo opportunity. After seeing the spectacle of the crown prince in shorts published in the newspapers, the king demanded that the heir to the throne be brought back to Bucharest. Helen now decided to grant an interview to the Daily Mail "in the hope," she said, "that public opinion would help to preserve her parental rights". This was followed by a violent press campaign, which enraged the king. Despite these events, Helen chose to return to Romania for Michael's birthday and threatened to go to the International Court of Justice if Carol II did not allow her to see their son.

Back in Bucharest, the princess tried, without much success, to get the government involved in a case against the king. She then turned again to her sister-in-law, the former queen of the Hellenes. However, the latter was deeply shocked by the interview given to the Daily Mail, and the two women had a violent fight during their reunion, where Elisabeth slapped Helen. Carol II then considered his former wife as a political opponent, and in order to undermine her prestige, the king initiated a campaign in the press against her, claiming that she had tried to commit suicide twice. After only a month in the country, Carol II imposed a new separation agreement (1 November 1932), under which Helen was denied the right to return to Romania and the next day, finally forced her into permanent exile in Italy. During the following years, she had no contact with her former husband, who only briefly told her by telephone of the death of Queen Marie in 1938. Despite the tensions, Prince Michael was able to see his mother every year in Florence for two months.

In Fiesole, the life of Helen and her sisters was relatively retired, even though they were frequently visited by the Italian House of Savoy, which had always been welcoming to the Greek royal family during its exile. The Greek princesses also used their connections to find a wife for Diadochos Paul, who remained single. In 1935, they took advantage of the presence in Florence of Princess Frederica of Hanover to arrange an encounter between her and their brother. Their good efforts paid off and Frederica quickly fell in love with the Diadochos. However, the princess' parents were reluctant to approve this relationship (Note: Paul was sixteen years older than Frederica, whose mother Princess Victoria Louise of Prussia, was a cousin of the Diadochos.) and it was not until 1937 that Paul and Frederica were finally allowed to get engaged. In the meantime, the Greek monarchy was restored and George II once again became King of Greece, but his wife Elisabeth, who filed for divorce on 6 July 1935, remained in Romania.

== Queen Mother of Romania ==
=== World War II and the dictatorship of Antonescu ===
Standard of the queen mother of Romania (1941–1947)

In Tuscany, Helen found real stability, despite the absence of her son most of the year. However, the outbreak of World War II again disrupted her daily routine. In accordance with the Molotov–Ribbentrop Pact, the Soviet Union forced Romania to cede Bessarabia and Northern Bukovina to them on 26 June 1940, and a few weeks later, the country was also forced to surrender Northern Transylvania to Hungary (Second Vienna Award, 30 August 1940) and the Southern Dobruja to Bulgaria (Treaty of Craiova, 7 September 1940); these territorial losses ended the Greater Romania, created at the end of World War I. Unable to maintain the territorial integrity of his country and under pressure from the Iron Guard, a fascist party supported by Nazi Germany, Carol II became increasingly unpopular and finally was forced to abdicate on 6 September 1940. His son Michael, aged 18, became king while General Ion Antonescu established a dictatorship with the support of members of the Iron Guard.

Eager to obtain the favor of the new sovereign (and some legitimation to his dictatorship), Antonescu granted Helen the title of "Queen Mother of Romania" (Regina-mamă Elena) with the style "Her Majesty" on 8 September 1940 and sent the diplomat Raoul Bossy to Fiesole to persuade her to return to Bucharest (12 September 1940). Back in Romania (14 September 1940), Helen found herself, however, subject to the whim of the dictator, determined to keep the royal family in a purely ceremonial role. Indeed, in the years that followed, Antonescu systematically excluded the king and his mother from political responsibility and didn't even bother to warn them of his decision to declare war on the Soviet Union in June 1941.

In this difficult context, Michael I was at times prone to bouts of depression and Helen then concentrated all of her efforts to make him more active. Aware of his shortcomings, the queen mother appealed to historians of the right to train her son in his role as sovereign. She also guided the king in his talks and pushed him to oppose Antonescu when she deemed that his policies endangered the crown. Alerted by the Rabbi Alexandru Șafran about the anti-Jewish persecutions, Helen personally appealed to the German ambassador Manfred Freiherr von Killinger and Antonescu to convince them to halt the deportations, being supported in her efforts by Patriarch Nicodim. For his part, the king vigorously protested to the Conducător at the time of the Odessa massacre and notably obtained the release of Wilhelm Filderman, president of the Romanian Jewish community.

Despite these few attempts of emancipation, Helen and her son spent most of the conflict playing as hosts of the German officers passing through Bucharest. The queen mother even met Hitler twice: firstly informally, with her sister Irene, (Note: Having married with Prince Aimone, Duke of Aosta in 1939, Irene now belonged to the Royal Family of Italy.) to discuss the fate of Greece (Note: At the time, Greece was in war against Italy and the Nazi Germany appeared as a possible mediator between the two countries.) and Romania within the new Europe (December 1940) and secondly formally with Michael I during a trip in Italy (winter of 1941). Above all, Helen and her son had no choice but to officially support the dictatorship of Antonescu. Thus, it was Michael I who gave the Conducător the title of Marshal (21 August 1941) after the reconquest of Bessarabia by the Romanian Army.

In the fall of 1942, Helen played a major role in stopping Antonescu from his plans to deport all of the Jews of the Regat to the German death camp of Bełżec in Poland. According to SS Hauptsturmführer Gustav Richter, the counselor for Jewish Affairs at the German legation in Bucharest in a report sent to Berlin on 30 October 1942:

"The queen mother told the king that what was happening...was a disgrace and that she could not bear it any longer, all the more so because [their names] would be permanently associated...with the crimes committed against the Jews, while she would be known as the mother of "Michael the Wicked". She is said to have warned the king that, if the deportations were not immediately halted, she would leave the country. As a result the King...telephoned Prime Minister Ion Antonescu and...a meeting of the Council of Ministers took place."

=== Coup of Michael I and end of the war ===
From 1941, the participation of the Romanian army in the invasion of the Soviet Union further damaged the relations between Antonescu and the royal family, who disapproved of the conquests of Odessa and Ukraine. However, it was the Battle of Stalingrad (23 August 1942 – 2 February 1943) and the losses incurred by the Romanian side that finally forced Michael I to organize around him a resistance against the dictatorship of the Conducător. During an official speech on 1 January 1943, the sovereign publicly condemned the participation of Romania in the war against the Soviet Union, triggering the wrath of both Antonescu and the Nazi Germany, who accused Helen of being behind the royal initiative. In retaliation, Antonescu tightened his control over Michael I and his mother, and threatened the royal family with the abolition of the monarchy if any further provocation were to occur.

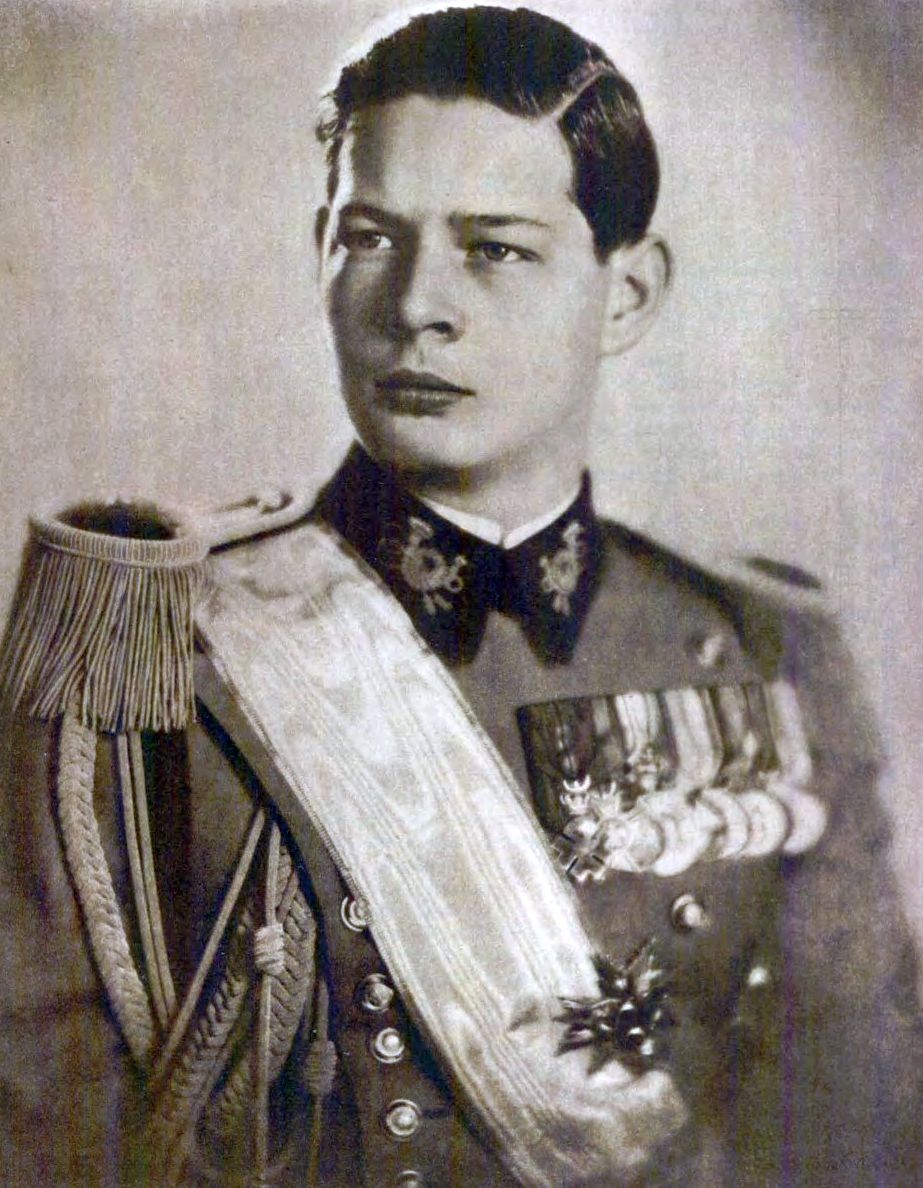
King Michael I of Romania, c. 1940

Over the next few months, the suspicious death of Tsar Boris III of Bulgaria (28 August 1943) and the successive arrests of princesses Mafalda of Savoy (Note: Princess Mafalda was deported to the Buchenwald concentration camp, where she died on 27 August 1944.) (23 September 1943) and Irene of Greece (October 1943) after the overthrow of Mussolini by King Victor Emmanuel III of Italy (25 July 1943), proved to Michael I and his mother just how dangerous opposition to the Axis powers was. The return of the Soviets in Bessarabia and the American bombing over Bucharest forced the king, despite everything, to break with the regime of Antonescu. On 23 August 1944 Michael I organized a coup d'état against the Conducător, (Note: Placed under house arrest, he was handed to the Soviets who kept him in prison for two years. Finally returned to Romania, he was judged and executed on 1 June 1946.) who was imprisoned. In the process, the king and his new government declared war on the Axis powers and asked the Romanian forces not to resist the Red Army, which nevertheless continued its invasion into the country.

In retaliation against this betrayal, the Luftflotte bombed Bucharest and Casa Nouă, the main residence of the sovereign and his mother since 1940, which was largely destroyed (24 August 1944). Nevertheless, the Romanian forces gradually managed to push the Germans out of the country and also attacked Hungary in order to liberate Transylvania (Siege of Budapest, 29 December 1944 – 13 February 1945). However, the Allies did not immediately recognize the reversal of Romania and the Soviets entered the capital on 31 August 1944. An armistice was finally signed with Moscow on 12 September 1944, which forced the kingdom to accept the Soviet occupation. A climate of uncertainty swept the country while the Red Army increased their demands.

Visiting Sinaia at the time of the royal coup d'état, Helen found her son the next day at Craiova. Back in Bucharest on 10 September 1944, the king and his mother moved into the residence of Princess Elizabeth, whose relations with Helen remained tense despite their reconciliation in 1940. With the increased instability in Romania, the queen mother was extremely concerned about the safety of her son, fearing that he could eventually be killed, like Prince-Regent Kiril of Bulgaria, shot by the Communists on 1 February 1945. The queen mother also disapproved of the influence of Ioan Stârcea over the sovereign and, following information from one of the palace servants, accused him of espionage on behalf of Antonescu. She was also concerned about the machinations of Carol II, who apparently waited for the end of the war to return to Romania, and observed with anxiety the political crisis that prevented King George II from regaining power in Greece. In this difficult context, Helen had the joy of learning that her sister Irene and her little nephew Amedeo were alive, although still in German hands.

Despite these political and personal concerns, the queen mother continued her charitable activities. She provided support to Romanian hospitals, and managed to save some of the equipment of the Red Army requisitions. On 6 November 1944 she inaugurated a soup kitchen in the ballroom of the Royal Palace, which served not less than 11,000 meals to children in the capital over the next three months. Finally, despite Moscow's opposition, the queen mother sent aid to Moldavia, where a terrible epidemic of typhus was raging.

=== Imposition of a communist regime ===
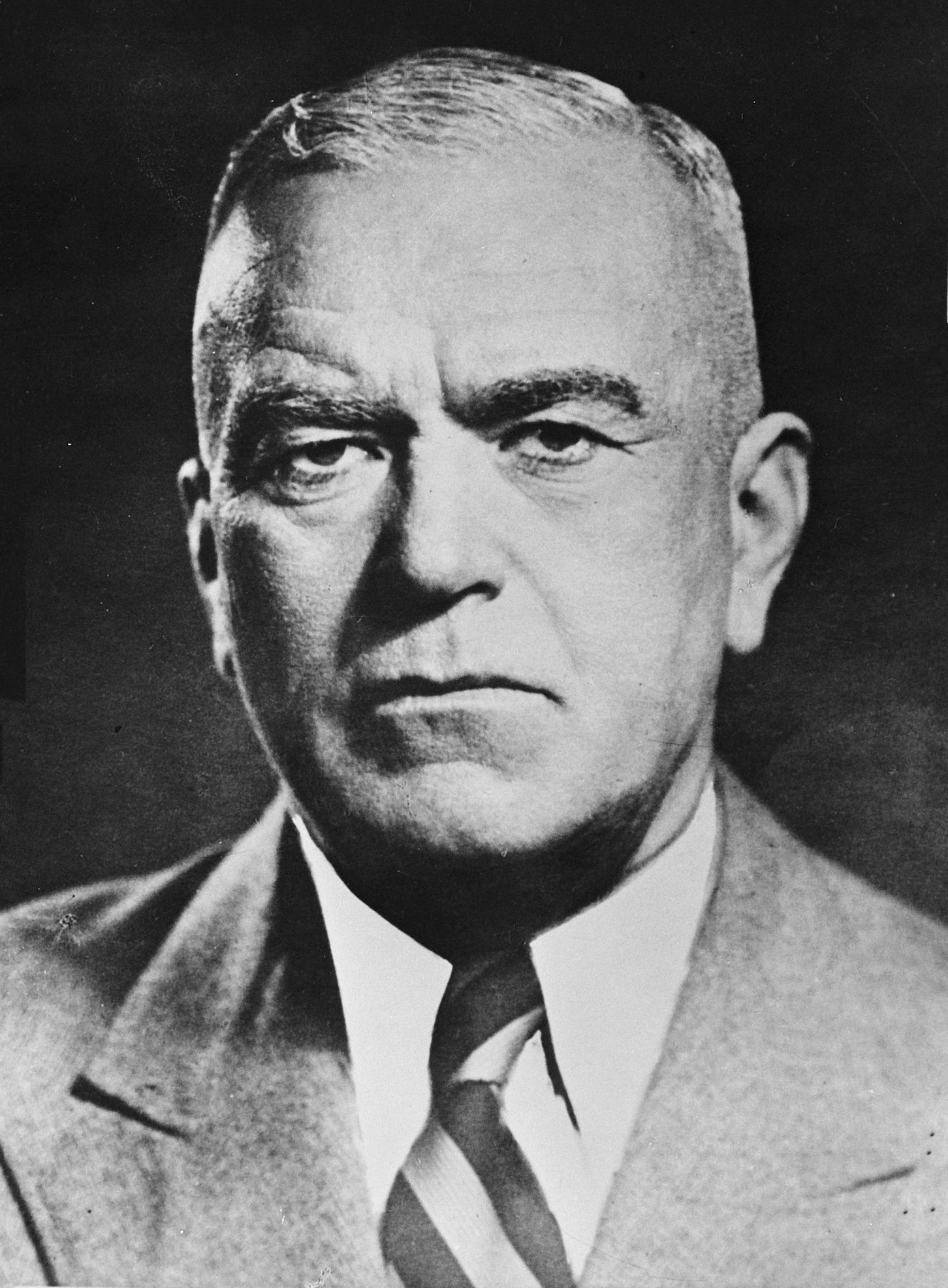
Prime Minister Petru Groza

With the Soviet occupation, the staff of the Romanian Communist Party, which counted only a few thousand members during the coup of Michael I, exploded and demonstrations against the government of Constantin Sănătescu multiplied. At the same time, acts of sabotage were occurring all over the country, preventing the Romanian economy from recovering. Faced with the combined pressures of the representative of the Soviet Union, Andrey Vyshinsky, and the People's Democratic Front (offshoot of the Communist Party), the king needed to build a new government and named Nicolae Rădescu as the new Prime Minister (7 December 1944). Nevertheless, the situation remained tense in the country and when the new head of the government called for municipal elections on 15 March 1945, the Soviet Union resumed its destabilizing operations in order to impose a government of their liking. The refusal of the United States and United Kingdom to intervene on his behalf led the sovereign to consider abdication but he abandoned the idea on the advice of representatives of the two major democratic political forces, Dinu Brătianu and Iuliu Maniu. On 6 March 1945 Michael I finally called Petru Groza, leader of the Ploughmen's Front, as the new head of a government which had no association with any representative of either the Peasants and the Liberal parties.

Satisfied with this appointment, the Soviet authorities were more conciliatory with Romania. On 13 March 1945 Moscow transferred the administration of Transylvania to Bucharest. A few months later, on 19 July 1945, Michael I was decorated with the Order of Victory, one of the most prestigious Soviet military orders. Still, the Sovietization of the kingdom was accelerated. The purge of "fascist" personalities continued while censorship was strengthened. A land reform was also implemented, causing a drop in production which ruined agricultural exports. The king, however, managed to temporarily prevent the establishment of People's Tribunals and the restoration of the death penalty.

After the Potsdam Conference and the reaffirmation by the Allies of the need to establish democratically elected governments in Europe, Michael I demanded the resignation of Petru Groza, who refused. Faced with this insubordination, the sovereign began a "royal strike" on 23 August 1945 during which he refused to countersign the acts of the government. With his mother, he locked himself in the Elisabeta Palace for six weeks before departing to Sinaia. The resistance of the monarch, however, was not supported by the West, who after the Moscow Conference of 25 December 1945, asked Romania to allow two opposition figures to enter the government. Disappointed by the lack of courage of London and Washington, the sovereign was shocked by the attitudes of Princesses Elisabeth and Ileana, (Note: According to some authors, like Ghislain de Diesbach and Jean-Paul Besse, Princess Ileana wanted to take advantage of her links with the Communists to overthrow Michael I and replace him with her own son, Archduke Stefan of Austria.) who openly supported the communist authorities. Disgusted by all these betrayals, Helen, in turn, encouraged fewer meetings with Soviet officials and worried every day for the life of her son.

The year 1946 was marked by the strengthening of the Communist dictatorship, despite active resistance of the sovereign. After several months of waiting, the parliamentary elections were held on 19 November 1946 and were officially won by the Ploughmen's Front. After that date, the situation of the king and his mother became more precarious. In their palace, they had no access to running water for three hours a day and the electricity was off most of the day. This did not prevent Helen from maintaining her charitable activities and continuing to send food and clothing to Moldavia. In early 1947, the queen mother also obtained permission to travel abroad to visit her family. She then reunited with her sister Irene, weakened after her deportation to Austria, attended the funeral of her elder brother, King George II, and participated in the marriage of her youngest sister, Princess Katherine, with British Major Richard Brandram.

The signing of the Paris Peace Treaties, on 10 February 1947, marked a new stage in the sidelining of the royal family by the Communist regime. Deprived of any official duties, the king was found even more isolated than during the "royal strike". Under these conditions, the queen mother considered exile with more determination but she was concerned that they did not possess any foreign resources, because her son refused to save money outside of Romania. As guests to the marriage of Princess Elizabeth of the United Kingdom with Prince Philip of Greece and Denmark (Helen's first cousin) on 20 November 1947, Michael I and his mother were provided with an opportunity to travel together abroad. During this stay, the king fell in love with Princess Anne of Bourbon-Parma, with whom he became engaged much to Helen's delight. This trip was also an opportunity for the queen mother to place two small paintings of El Greco from the royal collections in a Swiss bank.

== Abolition of the Romanian monarchy and Michael I's wedding ==
=== Deposition of Michael I and the first months of exile ===
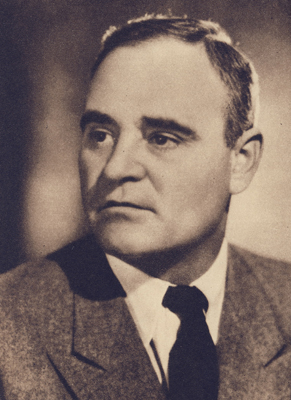
Gheorghe Gheorghiu-Dej

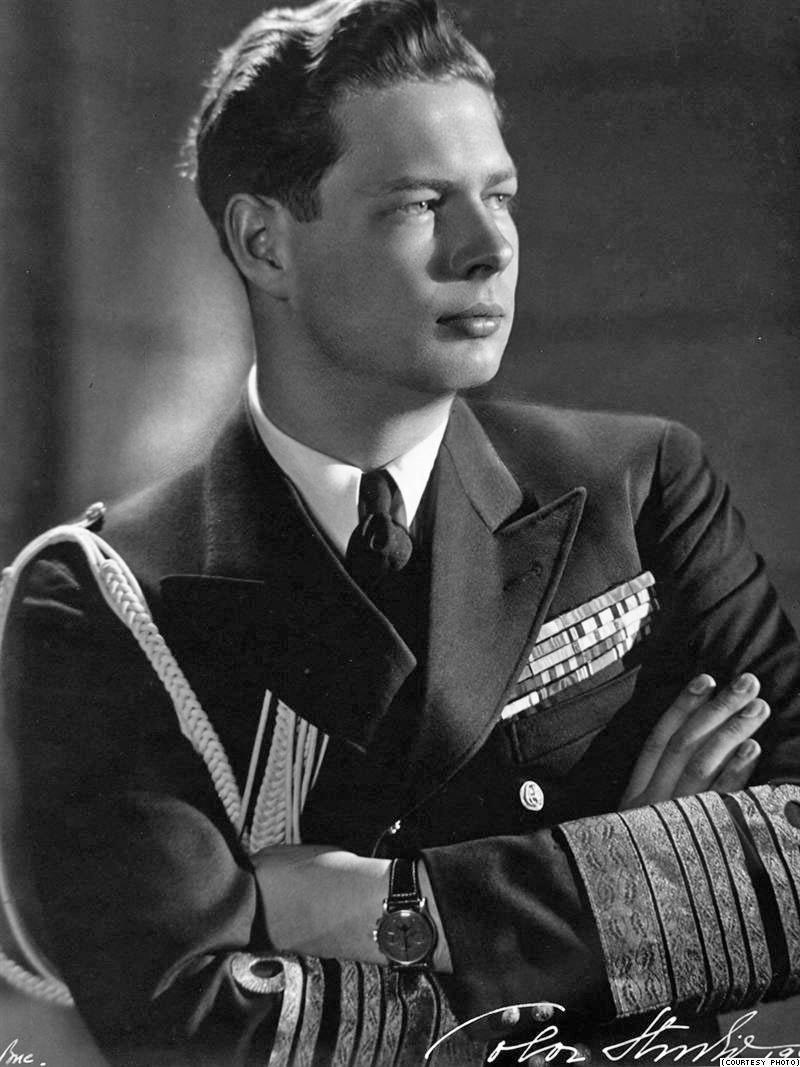
King Michael I at the time of his abdication, 1947

Despite the advice of their relatives, who urged them not to return to Romania in order to escape the communists, the king and his mother returned to Bucharest on 21 December 1947. They were coldly greeted by the government, which secretly hoped to see them stay abroad in order to abolish the monarchy. Their plan did not work, so Prime Minister Petru Groza and General Secretary of the Romanian Communist Party Gheorghe Gheorghiu-Dej decided to compel the sovereign to abdicate. On 30 December 1947 they asked for an audience with the king, who received them along with his mother. The two politicians asked Michael I to sign a declaration of abdication. The king refused, stating that, for such a thing, the Romanian population must be consulted. The two men threatened that if he persisted, over 1000 students arrested would be executed in retaliation. Thousands of people, including many students, were arrested in November 1946, after clashes with the Communist forces. The pro-democracy and freedom population defeated the Communist forces which were sent to the protests by the Communist government, but in return, many protesters were arrested by Communist authorities, with the help of the Red Army. The heavy clashes ensued in Bucharest and other big cities in Romania after the Communist Party falsified the votes for the 1946 Parliament elections, which the National Peasant's Party (PNȚ) had won with over 70%. Forced with this blackmail, Michael I renounced the crown. Only hours after the announcement, the Romanian People's Republic was proclaimed. Michael I and Helen left Romania with some partisans on 3 January 1948. Despite their close links with the Communists, Princesses Elisabeth and Ileana were also forced to leave the country a few days later, on 12 January.

In exile, Michael I and Helen settled for some time in Switzerland, where the deposed sovereign bitterly observed the Western acceptance of the establishment of a communist republic in Romania. For her part, Helen was mostly concerned with the state of their finances because the Communists allowed them to part with almost nothing. Despite their promises, the new Romanian authorities nationalized the properties of the former royal family (20 February 1948) and deprived the former monarch and his relatives of their nationality (17 May 1948). At the same time, the king and his mother had to deal with the intrigues of Carol II, who still considered himself the only legitimate sovereign of Romania and accused his ex-wife of keeping him away from their son. To achieve his ends, Carol II did not hesitate to involve Frederick, Prince of Hohenzollern-Sigmaringen (Head of the dynasty) and Prince Nicholas of Romania in his intrigues. These concerns did not prevent Michael I and his mother from undertaking several political trips to the United Kingdom, France and the United States to meet with government leaders and representatives of the Romanian diaspora.

=== Marriage of Michael I and Anne of Bourbon-Parma ===
Another source of concern from Michael I and his mother during their first months of exile was his marriage with Princess Anne of Bourbon-Parma. To discredit the former monarch, the Romanian authorities promoted rumors that Michael I gave up his dynastic rights in order to marry the woman of his heart, as his father did in 1925.

Added to this, the most serious difficulties were related to religion. Being a Roman Catholic, Princess Anne had to obtain a papal dispensation to marry an Orthodox. However, the Vatican had been extremely reluctant to grant consent because, for dynastic reasons, the couple's children would have to be raised in Michael I's religion. After Prince René of Bourbon-Parma, father of the bride, failed in his negotiations with the Vatican, Helen decided to go to Rome with Princess Margaret of Denmark (Anne's mother) to meet Pope Pius XII. However, the meeting ended badly and the Pope refused to agree to the marriage. Under these circumstances, Princess Anne had no choice but to override the pontifical will and abandon a Catholic marriage. In doing so, she incurred the wrath of her uncle, Prince Xavier of Bourbon-Parma, who forbade the members of his family to attend the royal wedding under threat of being excluded from the House of Bourbon-Parma. Once again, the queen mother tried to mediate, this time with Anne's family, but without success.

Helen had better luck with her own family. Her brother, King Paul I of Greece, offered to organize Michael's wedding in Athens, despite official protests from the Romanian government. The wedding was finally celebrated in the Greek capital on 10 June 1948 with Archbishop Damaskinos himself officiating the ceremony. Celebrated in the throne room of the Royal Palace, the wedding brought together most of the members of the Greek dynasty but no representative of the Houses of Bourbon-Parma or Hohenzollern-Sigmaringen. In fact, Carol II was not invited to the wedding, despite Helen having written to him about the marriage.

== Exile and later years ==
=== Return to Villa Sparta ===
After the marriage of Michael I and Anne, Helen returned to Villa Sparta in Fiesole. Through 1951, she hosted her son and his family, who visited with her at least twice a year. Over the years, the family of the former king grew with the successive births of princesses Margareta (1949), Elena (1950), Irina (1953), Sophie (1957) and Maria (1964). From 1949 to 1950, Helen also housed her sister Irene and her nephew Amedeo, who later settled in a neighboring residence. Over the years, the two Greek princesses retained a strong bond, which ended with the death of the duchess of Aosta in 1974. Throughout her life, Helen also remained deeply attached to Amedeo and his first wife, Princess Claude of Orléans.

Helen also made many trips abroad to visit her relatives. She traveled regularly to the United Kingdom to see her granddaughters, who were schooling there. Despite her sometimes stormy relationship with her sister-in-law, Queen Frederica, Helen also spent long periods in Greece and participated in the Cruise of the Kings in 1954, the marriage of Princess Sophia with the future King Juan Carlos I of Spain (1962) and the events organized to mark the centenary of the Greek dynasty (1963).

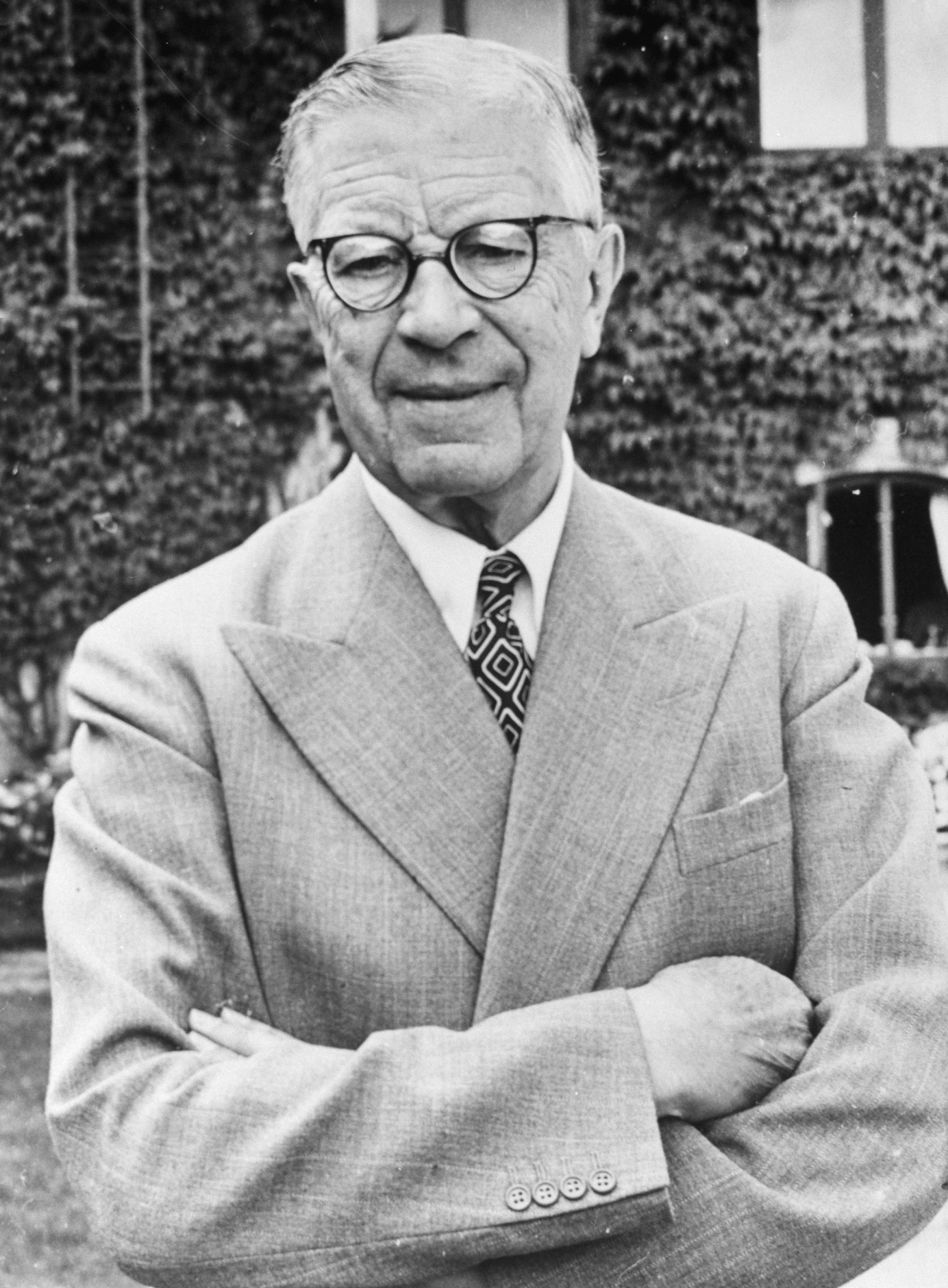
King Gustaf VI Adolf of Sweden, 1962

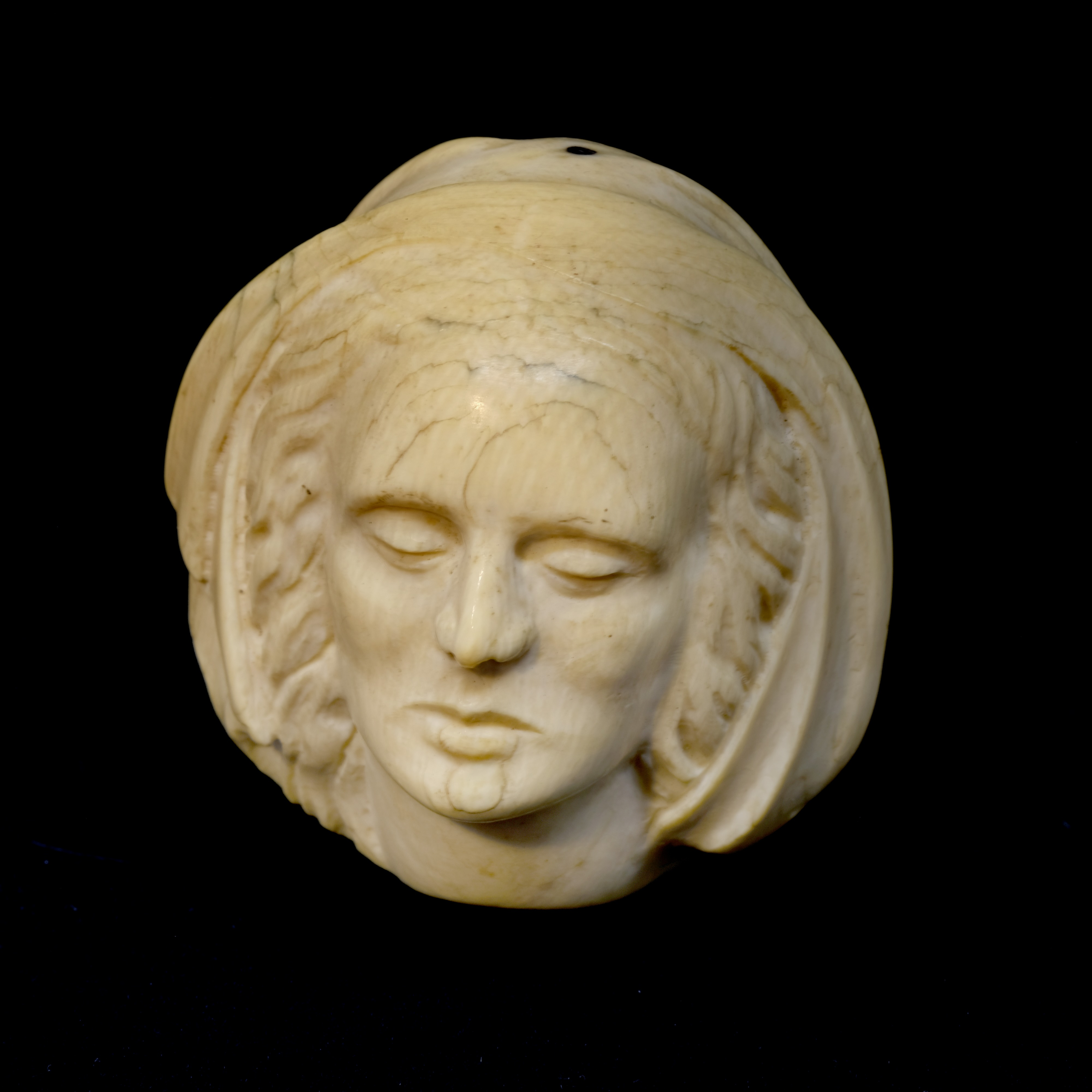
Head of a Madonna engraved with a dentist's drill by the princess Elena of Greece on an ivory billiard ball. Signed "E 1944". This is a gift to the painter Leonardo Cominotto from the princess herself. Sinaia, Romania – 1945.

Despite this, Helen's life was not solely devoted to her family. Passionate about Renaissance architecture and painting, she spent much of her time visiting monuments and museums. She also dedicated herself to creating artistic objects, for example an engraving made with a dentist's drill on an ivory billiard ball. A gardening enthusiast, she devoted long hours to the flowers and shrubs of her residence. A regular guest of the British Consulate, she also frequented the intellectuals who, like Harold Acton, had settled in the region of Florence. From 1968 to 1973, Helen had a romantic relationship with the twice-widower King Gustaf VI Adolf of Sweden, with whom she shared a love of art and plants. At one point, he asked her to marry him, but she refused.

In 1956 Helen consented for Arthur Gould Lee to publish her biography. At this point, her life was marked by financial difficulties which continued to worsen over time. Despite still being deprived of income by the Romanian authorities, the queen mother economically supported her son, and also helped him to find jobs, first as a pilot in Switzerland, then as a broker on Wall Street. Helen also supported the studies of her eldest granddaughter Margareta, and even welcomed her at Villa Sparta for a year before she entered a British university. To do this, Helen was forced to sell her assets one by one and in the early 1970s, she hardly had anything left. In 1973, she mortgaged her residence and three years later, she sold the two Greco paintings that she had brought with her from Romania in 1947.

=== Life in Switzerland and death ===
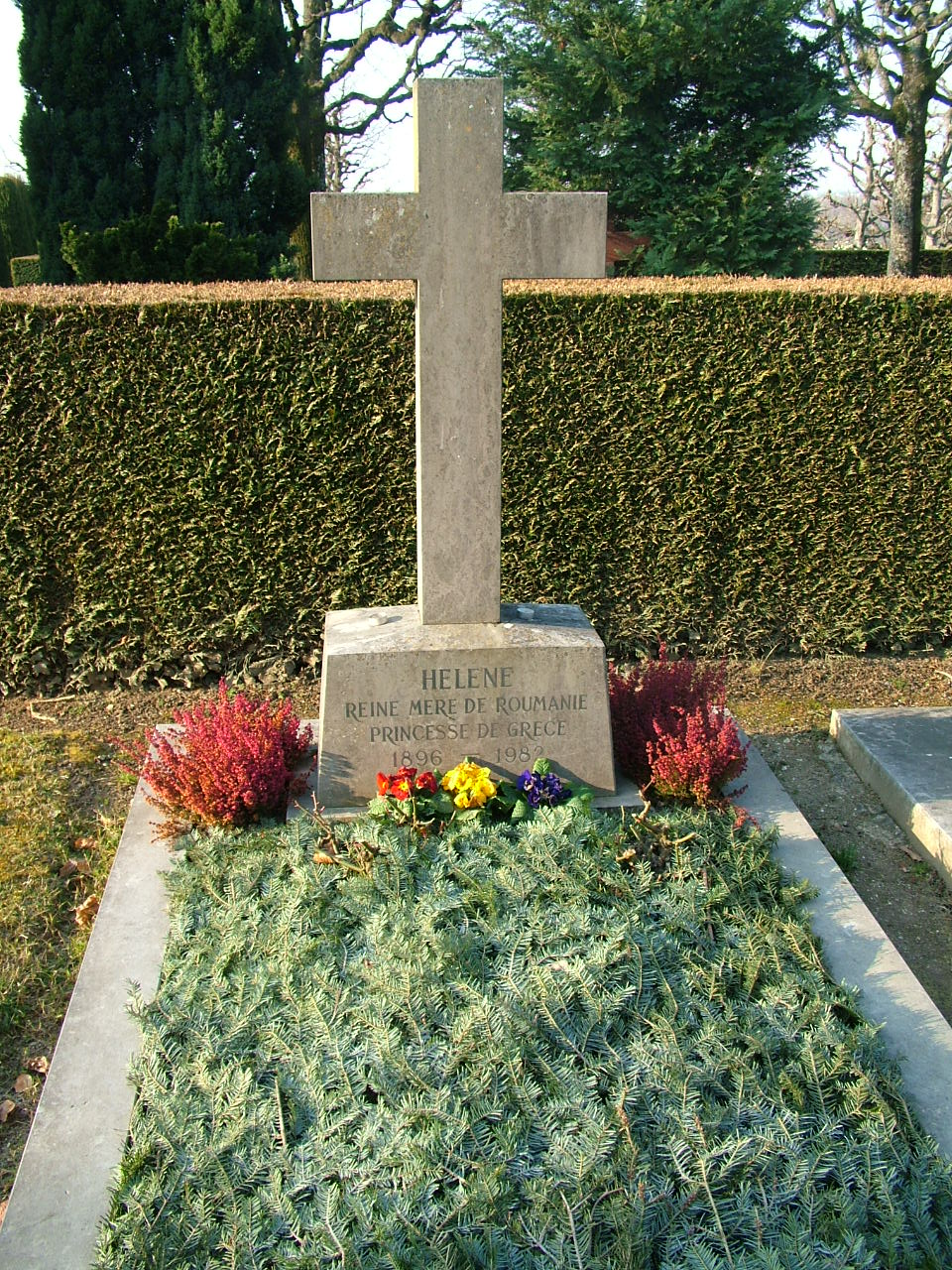
Former grave of Helen, Queen Mother of Romania, at Bois-de-Vaux

Becoming too old to live alone, Helen finally left Fiesole in 1979. She then moved to a small apartment in Lausanne, located 45 minutes from the residence of Michael I and Anne, before moving in with them at Versoix in 1981. Helen, queen mother of Romania, died one year later on 28 November 1982, aged 86. She was buried without pomp in the Bois-de-Vaux Cemetery and the funerals were celebrated by Damaskinos Papandreou, the first Greek Orthodox Metropolitan of Switzerland.

Eleven years after her death, in March 1993, the State of Israel gave Helen the title of Righteous Among the Nations in recognition for her actions during World War II towards Romanian Jews, several thousands of whom she managed to save from 1941 to 1944. The announcement was made to the royal family by Alexandru Șafran, then Chief Rabbi of Geneva.

In January 2018, it was announced that the remains of King Carol II would be moved to the new Archdiocesan and Royal Cathedral, along with those of Queen Mother Helen. In addition, the remains of Prince Mircea would also be moved to the new cathedral. His remains are currently interred at the Bran Castle's Chapel.

Queen Mother Helen of Romania was reburied at the New Episcopal and Royal Cathedral in Curtea de Argeș on 19 October 2019.

== Archives ==
Queen Helen's correspondence with the Romanian diplomat George I. Duca between 1940 and 1982 is preserved in the "George I. Duca Papers" collection in the Hoover Institution Archives (Stanford, California, USA).

== Honours ==
- House of Hohenzollern-Sigmaringen-Romania: Knight Grand Cross with Collar of the Royal Order of Carol I

== Ancestry ==
Ancestors of Helen of Greece and Denmark

8. Christian IX of Denmark
4. George I of Greece
9. Princess Louise of Hesse-Kassel
2. Constantine I of Greece
10. Grand Duke Constantine Nikolaevich of Russia
5. Grand Duchess Olga Constantinovna of Russia
11. Princess Alexandra of Saxe-Altenburg
1. Princess Helen of Greece and Denmark
12. William I, German Emperor
6. Frederick III, German Emperor
13. Princess Augusta of Saxe-Weimar-Eisenach
3. Princess Sophie of Prussia
14. Prince Albert of Saxe-Coburg and Gotha
7. Victoria, Princess Royal
15. Victoria of the United Kingdom

== Bibliography ==
- Besse, Jean-Paul (2010), Ileana, l'archiduchesse voilée, Versailles, Via romana ISBN 978-2916727745
- Gelardi, Julia (2006), Born to Rule : Granddaughters of Victoria, Queens of Europe, Headline Review ISBN 0755313925
- Gould Lee, Arthur Stanley (1956), Helen, Queen Mother of Rumania, Princess of Greece and Denmark: An Authorized Biography, London: Faber and Faber
- Marcou, Lilly (2002), Le Roi trahi : Carol II de Roumanie, Pygmalion ISBN 2857047436
- Mateos Sainz de Medrano, Ricardo (2004), La Familia de la Reina Sofía : La Dinastía griega, la Casa de Hannover y los reales primos de Europa, Madrid, La Esfera de los Libros ISBN 84-9734-195-3
- Muzeul Naţional de Istorie a României (2009). Familia regala. O istorie in imagini [The Royal Family. A History in Images] (in Romanian). Cetatea de Scaun. ISBN 978-973-8966-97-0.
- Pakula, Hannah (1996), The Last Romantic : A Biography of Queen Marie of Roumania, Weidenfeld & Nicolson History ISBN 1-8579-98162
- Porter, Ivor (2005), Michael of Romania. The King and the Country, Phoenix Mill: Sutton Publishing
- "Queen Helen of Rumania", The Times (30 November 1982): 12.
- Van der Kiste, John (1994), Kings of the Hellenes : The Greek Kings, 1863–1974 ISBN 0750921471
