= Bezalel Ze'ev Șafran =

Romanian rabbi and halakhic authority (1867–1929)

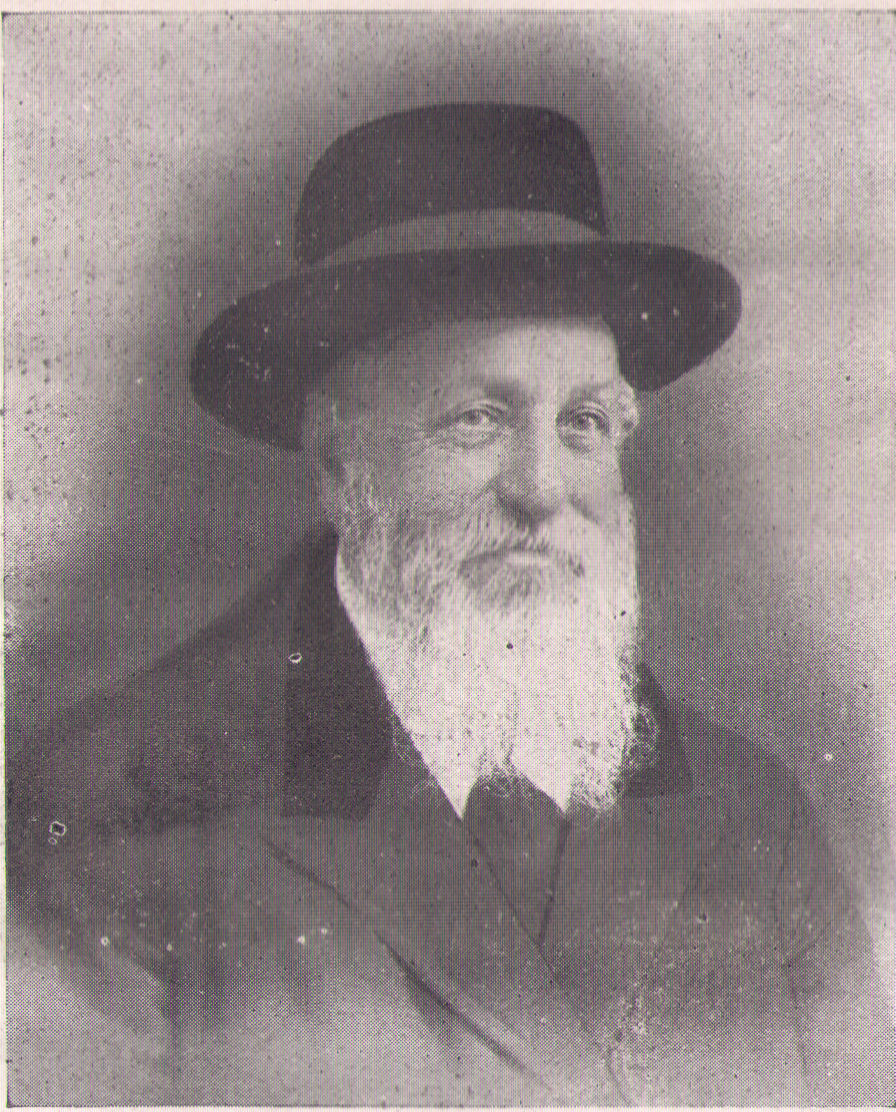
Bezalel Ze'ev Shafran

Bezalel Ze'ev Șafran (בצלאל זאב שפרן; 1867 – December 1929), also known as HaGaon mi-Bacău (הגאון מבקאו, "the Gaon of Bacău"), was a Romanian rabbi and halakhic authority. He was regarded as one of the leading halakhic authorities in Romania, and rabbis from throughout the country submitted questions of Jewish law to him. Originally from Galicia, he settled in Romania in 1887 and served successively as rabbi of Sculeni, Ștefănești, and Bacău.

== Life and rabbinical career ==
Șafran was born in Galicia in 1867. He studied under his grandfather, Hanoch Henikh Safran, and the rabbis Isaac Aaron Ittinga of Lemberg and Jacob Wiedenfeld of Grimailov.

In 1887, he moved to Romania and became rabbi of Sculeni. He subsequently served as rabbi of Ștefănești before being appointed rabbi of Bacău and the surrounding district in 1905. He held that position until his death in December 1929.

The German rabbi and scholar Yechiel Yaakov Weinberg praised Șafran's knowledge of rabbinic literature and regarded him as one of the leading rabbinical scholars of his generation.

== Halakhic writings ==
Șafran's responsa were collected in Shu"t ha-Rabaz (שו"ת הרב"ז), a multi-volume collection of his rulings on Jewish law. Among the questions he addressed were mixed dancing at Jewish weddings and whether food could be heated on Shabbat in an electric oven activated by a timer.

Șafran made extensive use of the Jerusalem Talmud in his responsa, an approach uncommon among contemporary halakhic authorities.
