= Damaskinos Papandreou of Adrianople =

Greek bishop (1936–2011)

Damaskinos Papandreou (born Vasileos Papandreou, Βασίλειος Παπανδρέου; February 23, 1936, in Thermo, Aetolia-Acarnania – November 5, 2011, in Geneva) was the Greek Orthodox metropolitan bishop of Adrianople from 2003 until his death.

Prior to that he was titular metropolitan of Trajanopolis from 1970, elevated to active metropolitan in 1975, and was elected as the first metropolitan of Switzerland in 1982.
