= Nicolae Ceaușescu's cult of personality =

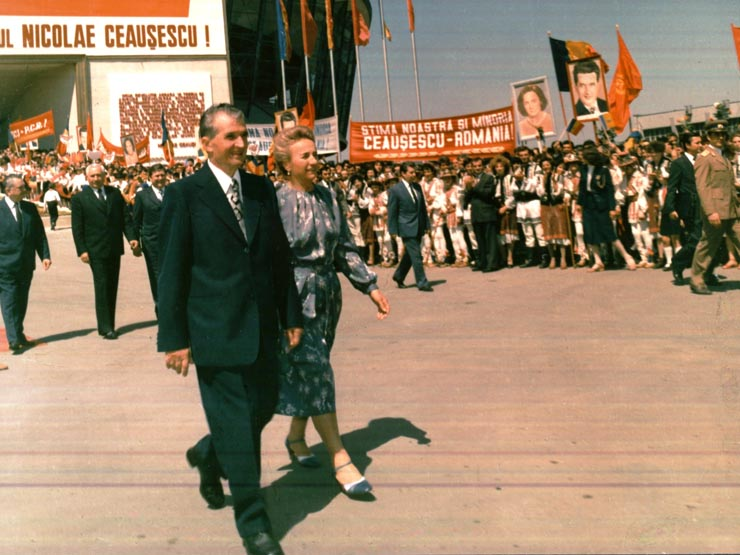
Nicolae Ceaușescu and his wife, Elena, in 1986. Propaganda posters and images of the Ceaușescus are ubiquitous.

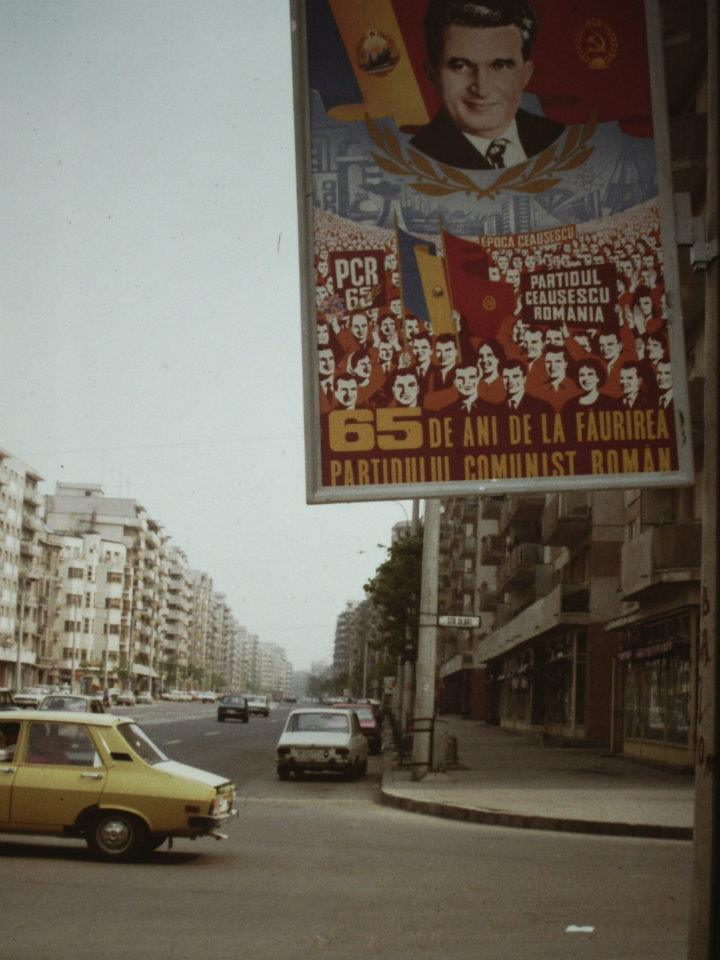
A propaganda poster on the streets of Bucharest, 1986. The caption reads "65 years since the creation of the Romanian Communist Party", while in the background it reads "Ceaușescu Era" and "The Party. Ceaușescu. Romania"

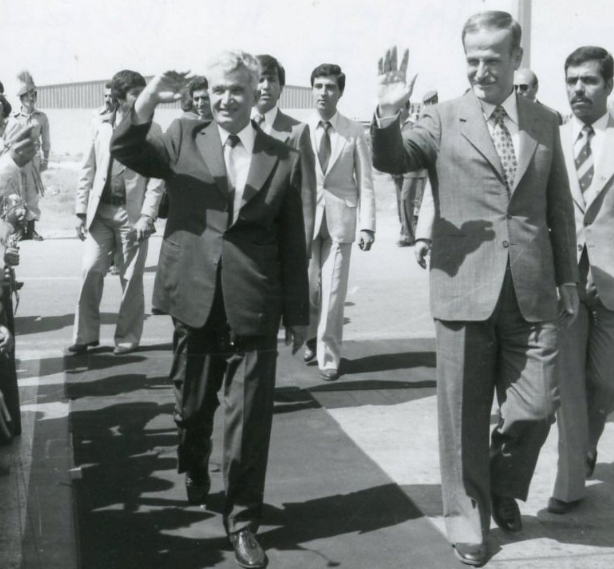
Ceaușescu (left) with Ba'athist dictator Hafez al-Assad (right) during his visit to Syria in 1979. Both of their regimes built neo-Stalinist cults of personality to consolidate power

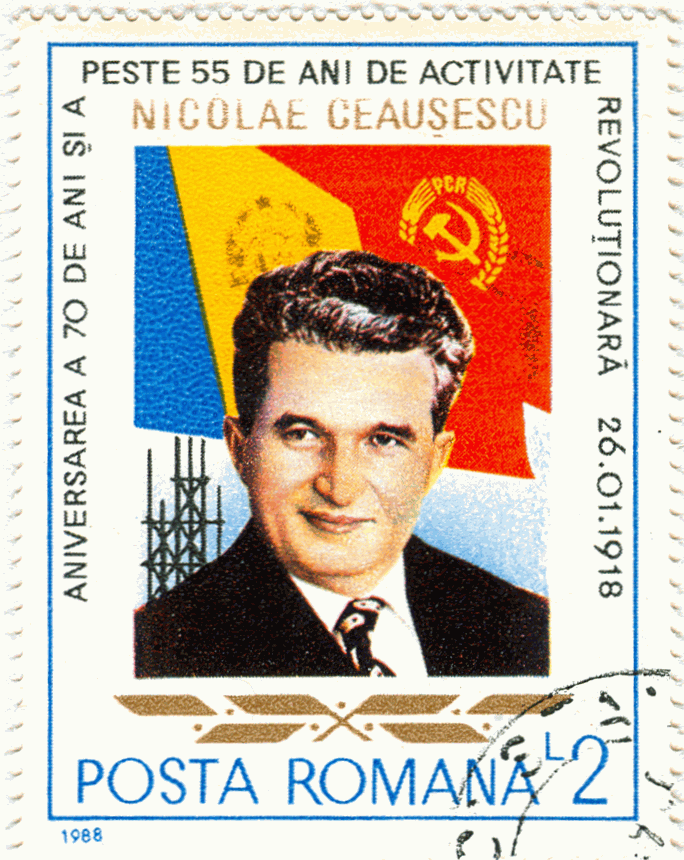
Stamp commemorating the 70th birthday (and 55 years of political activity) of Nicolae Ceaușescu, 1988

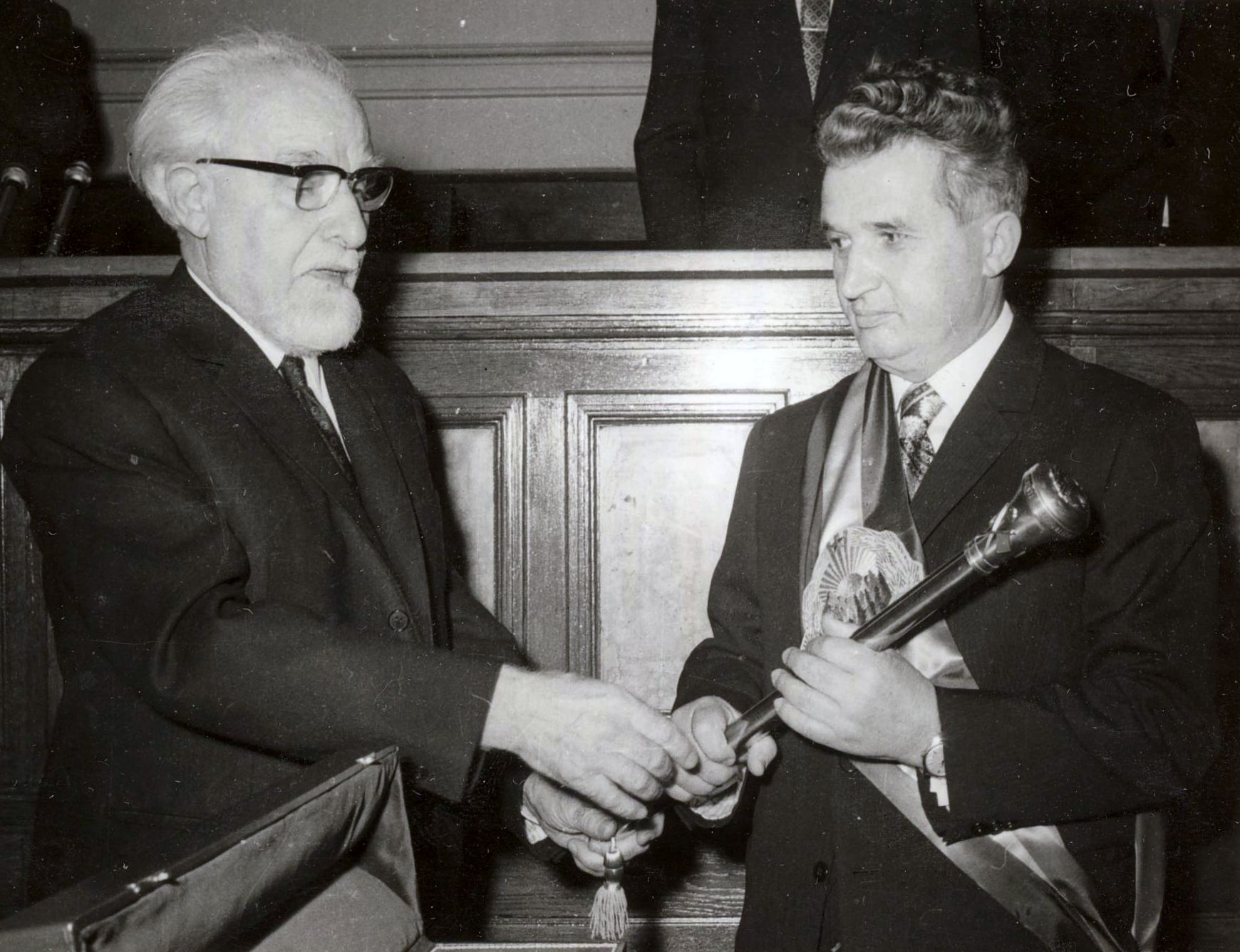
Ceaușescu receiving the presidential sceptre from the Chairman of the Grand National Assembly, Ștefan Voitec, to mark his election as President of Romania, 28 March 1974

During the Cold War, Romanian dictator Nicolae Ceaușescu presided over the most pervasive cult of personality within the Eastern Bloc. Inspired by personality cults surrounding Kim Il Sung in North Korea, Mao Zedong in China and possibly King Carol II's, it started with the 1971 July Theses which reversed the liberalization of the 1960s, imposed a strict nationalist ideology, established Stalinist totalitarianism and a return to socialist realism. Initially, the cult of personality was just focused on Ceaușescu himself. By the early 1980s, however, his wife, Elena Ceaușescu—one of the few spouses of a Communist leader to become a power in her own right—was also a focus of the cult.

== Origin ==
Early seeds of the cult of personality can be found in the acclamation of Ceaușescu following his speech of 21 August 1968, in which he denounced the Warsaw Pact invasion of Czechoslovakia. From that date, there was an increasing identification of Romania with Ceaușescu in both the Romanian media and in the statements of other officials.

== 1971 visit to China and North Korea ==
The real beginning of the cult of personality, however, came after Ceaușescu visited China and North Korea in 1971. He was particularly impressed by the highly personal way that China's Mao Zedong and North Korea's Kim Il Sung ruled their countries, as well as the personality cults surrounding them. North Koreans in particular performed songs and displayed images of the founding of Romania in 1877 to the communist regime.

Ceaușescu's predecessor, Gheorghe Gheorghiu-Dej, had been the subject of a personality cult. However, the cult surrounding Ceaușescu went well beyond anything surrounding Gheorghiu-Dej, with one observer describing it as a "sultanistic regime."

== Characteristics ==
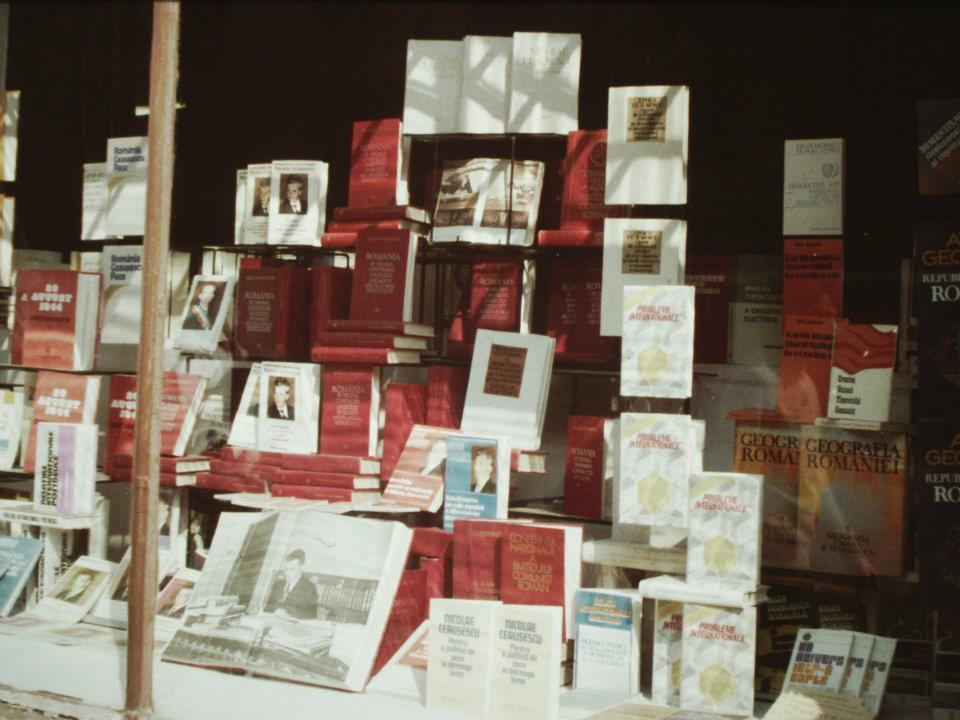
A Bucharest bookstore window, showcasing Ceaușescu's work, c. 1986

Ceaușescu served as General Secretary of the Romanian Communist Party, the most powerful position in the communist state, since 1965. He also became president of the State Council in 1967, making him de jure as well as de facto head of state. In 1974, he had the post upgraded to a full-fledged executive post, the President of the Republic. The presidency was vested with near-dictatorial powers.

At that time, he was given a king-like "Presidential sceptre". Salvador Dalí congratulated him for his new sceptre in a telegram published by the state-controlled press in Romania, which failed to notice its sarcasm:

I deeply appreciated your historic decision to establish the presidential sceptre.

Additionally, Ceaușescu was chairman of the Supreme Council for Economic and Social Development, president of the National Council of Working People, and chairman of the Socialist Democracy and Unity Front.

From early years, schoolchildren learned poems and songs in which the "party, the leader and the nation" were praised. The purpose of the cult was to make any public opposition to Ceaușescu impossible, because he was considered by definition to be infallible and above any criticism.

== Media portrayals ==
Ceaușescu began to be portrayed by the Romanian media as a communist theoretician of genius who made significant contributions to Marxism-Leninism and a political leader whose thought was the source of all national accomplishments. His collected works were republished at regular intervals and translated into several languages. The works eventually numbered dozens of volumes and were omnipresent in Romanian bookstores. Elena was portrayed as the "Mother of the Nation." By all accounts, her vanity and her desire for honours exceeded that of her husband.

The media used the expression "golden era of Ceaușescu" and a plethora of formulaic appellations such as "guarantor of the nation's progress and independence" and "visionary architect of the nation's future". Dan Ionescu, a writer for Radio Free Europe compiled a list of epithets for Ceaușescu that were used by Romanian writers. They included "architect", "celestial body" (Mihai Beniuc), "demiurge", "secular god" (Corneliu Vadim Tudor), "fir tree", "Prince Charming" (Ion Manole), "genius", "saint" (Eugen Barbu), "miracle", "morning star" (Vasile Andronache), "navigator" (Victor Nistea), "saviour" (Niculae Stoian), "sun" (Alexandru Andrițoiu), "titan" (Ion Potopin), and "visionary" (Viorel Cozma). He was most commonly described as the Conducător, or "the leader."

However, he was also described as being a man of humble origins, who had risen to the top through his own efforts, and was thus linked symbolically to common folk heroes in Romanian history, such as Horea and Avram Iancu.

Not surprisingly, the Ceaușescus were greatly concerned about their public image. Most photos of them showed them in their late 40s. Romanian state television was under strict orders to portray them in the best possible light. For instance, producers had to take great care to ensure that Ceaușescu's small stature (he was 1.68 m (5 ft 6 in) tall) was never emphasized on screen. Elena was never seen in profile because of her large nose and overall homely appearance. Consequences for breaking these rules were severe; one producer showed footage of Ceaușescu blinking and stuttering, and was banned for three months.

At one time, the ubiquitous photographs of Ceaușescu were all representing one photo in which he was shown in half-profile, with just one ear showing. After a joke spread about this being the portrait "in one ear" (a Romanian idiom meaning "to be crazy"), the photographs from profile were considered improper and the portraits were replaced with new photographs in which both ears were clearly visible.

== Arts and literature ==
Intellectuals were called upon to voice their appreciation of Ceaușescu. In 1973, a large tome called Omagiu ("Homage") was published in his praise. By the 1980s, annual volumes of praise by Romanian intellectuals were published, containing prose, poetry, and songs. These volumes were published on Ceaușescu's birthday, which was a national holiday.

Artists such as painter Sabin Bălașa depicted Ceaușescu in works of art commissioned by the state.

== Dissent ==
=== Within civil society ===
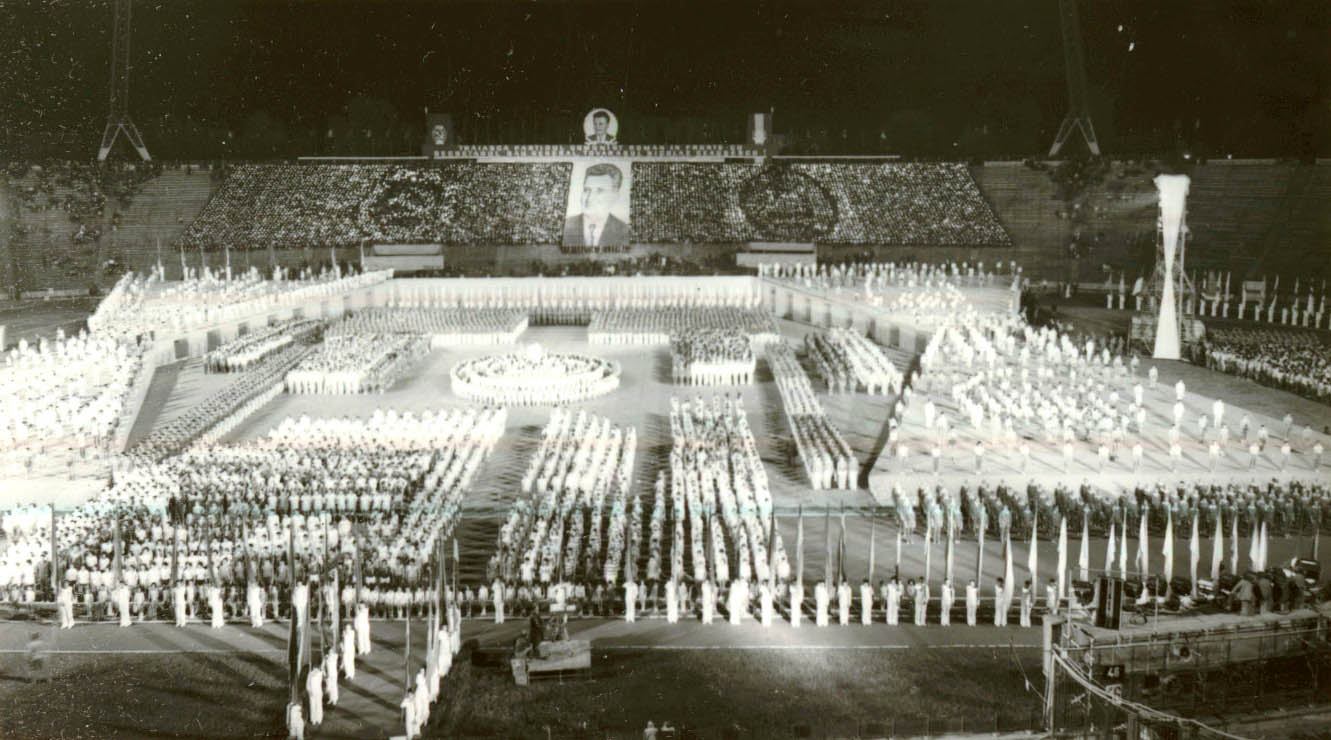
September 1978 rally at the 23 August Stadium in Bucharest

According to dissident Mihai Botez, the main reason why few people were willing to openly express dissent was not just an issue of courage, but also a cost–benefit analysis: many people realized that speaking out would do nothing to hurt the well-organized regime, because they would suffer the consequences for doing so, such as being expelled from the university, or sent into exile.

The problem was also augmented by the fact that until the late 1980s, Western countries had good relations with Ceaușescu and they did not care about Romania's internal problems. The admiration for Romania's independent policies expressed by the United States, United Kingdom, France and Japan discouraged the opposition. Mihai Botez said he felt that for years, dissidents like him were perceived as "enemies of the West" because they were trying to distance Ceaușescu from the United States.

The Western countries' support for Ceaușescu ended with the rise of Mikhail Gorbachev in March 1985, when Ceaușescu ceased to be relevant on the world scene and Western countries criticised him for his unwillingness to implement his own version of perestroika and glasnost.

=== Within the Communist Party ===
There was little dissent within the Romanian Communist Party. One major incident was in November 1979, during the Twelfth Congress of the Communist Party, when an elderly high-ranking official, Constantin Pîrvulescu, accused the Congress of doing little to address the problems that existed inside the country, because it was instead preoccupied with perpetuating Ceaușescu's glorification. Following this, he was expelled from the Congress and put under strict surveillance and house arrest.

== Legacy ==
By the late 1980s, the Communist Party—and indeed, nearly all other institutions in Romania—had become completely subordinated to Ceaușescu's will. Although Ceaușescu was a national Communist, his absolute control over the country and the pervasiveness of the cult led several non-Romanian observers to describe his regime as one of the closest things to an old-style Stalinist regime. Partly due to the PCR's subordination to Ceaușescu, it disappeared in the immediate aftermath of the Romanian Revolution and has never been revived.

Due to the cult of personality and along with it the concentration of power in the hands of the Ceaușescu family, much of the Romanian people's frustration was directed personally against Nicolae Ceaușescu, rather than against the political apparatus of the Communist Party as a whole. This is perhaps why the winner of the 1990 general election was the National Salvation Front, made up largely of former Communist Party members.

== See also ==
- Kim family (North Korea)
- Assad family
- List of cults of personality
- Mao Zedong's cult of personality
- North Korean cult of personality
- Joseph Stalin's cult of personality
- Xi Jinping's cult of personality
- Saddam Hussein's cult of personality
- Assad family's cult of personality
