= Carol II of Romania's cult of personality =

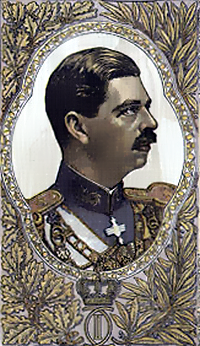
Carol II, as depicted on a 1934 thousand lei banknote

Carol II, the King of Romania from 1930 to 1940, was the focus of a cult of personality for much of the latter part of his reign. The cult peaked with the suspension of the 1923 Constitution of Romania and the establishment of a "royal dictatorship" in 1938 (see 1938 Constitution of Romania, National Renaissance Front). His personality cult shared some features with Communist leader Nicolae Ceaușescu's own personality cult that took root three decades later. Indeed, there have been a number of suggestions that Ceaușescu was inspired by Carol's cult.

The propaganda and personality cult were tame at first, but they grew in time as Carol II carefully cultivated the image of "Conducător (leader)", "Saviour", "King of the Rebirth", "Voivode of Culture" and "Great Watchman".

== Press depiction ==
Following the establishment of the royal dictatorship, the king was depicted in the press as being called to redeem to the state its noble mission that had been usurped by the political parties' regime due to their incompetence.

== Rallies and Restoration Day ==
Mihai Ralea and Gheorghe Grigorovici at a National Renaissance Front meeting. Behind them is a giant portrait of King Carol II of Romania

A major part of Carol II's cult of personality was made out of the anniversary rallies which gathered thousands of people and involved military parades, speeches and men in specific uniforms. Apart from 10 May, which was the Monarchy Day in Romania, Carol II created a new holiday, "Restoration Day", celebrated on 8 June. Each year, on Restoration Day, thousands and then tens of thousands of people, of all social strata and from across the country, participated in the parade, held on the Cotroceni hill and then the ANEF stadium.

For the 5th anniversary of the Restoration 25,000 young girls and boys paraded in front of the King on top of the Cotroceni hill. The celebration was officially addressed to the youth, who represented the "New Era" created by the King.

Following the creation of the paramilitary youth organization Straja Țării, the Restoration Day parades changed their organization, being held on ANEF stadium and included sports exercises and choreography, but the purpose was kept: glorifying the King and his deeds. At the end, the youth used their bodies to write "Carol 2" and then they formed the monogram of the king. Carol II received from the members of Straja Țării from across the country gifts of sheaves of wheat, garlands of flowers and soil, while cyclists brought a pitcher of water from Vadul Crișului, where he landed in 1930 when coming back to Romania.

As time went on, Carol's regime took on more overtly fascist characteristics. As early as 1939, ministers greeted Carol with a fascist-style salute. Also around this time, propaganda began officially referring to him as "Conducător."
