= Carol II of Romania =

King of Romania from 1930 to 1940

Carol II
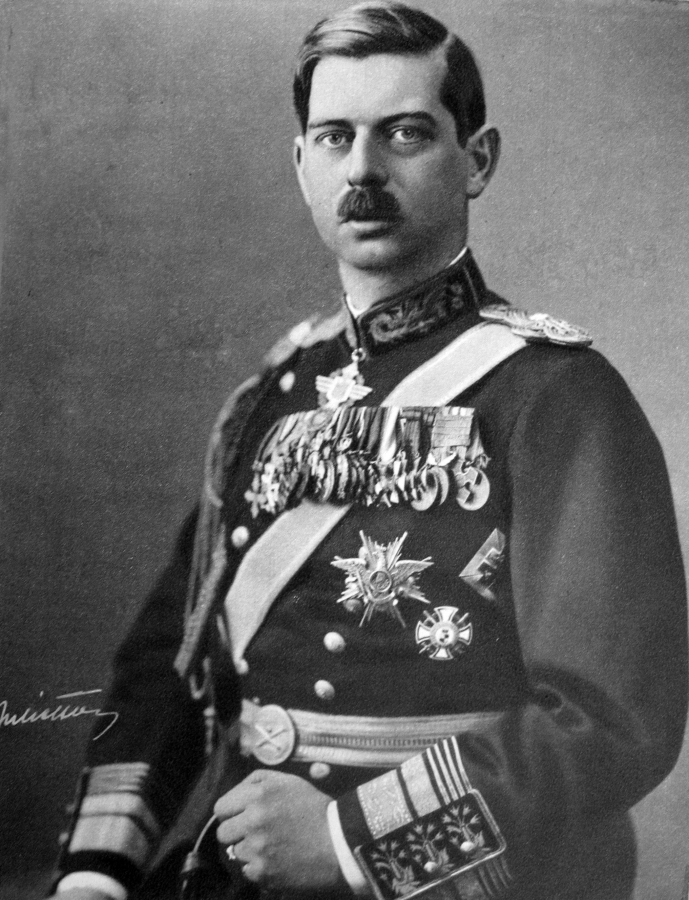
- Carol II, c. 1935

King of Romania
- Reign: 8 June 1930 – 6 September 1940
- Predecessor: Michael I
- Successor: Michael I
- Prime Minister: See list: Gheorghe Mironescu, Iuliu Maniu, Nicolae Iorga, Alexandru Vaida-Voevod, Ion G. Duca, Constantin Angelescu, Gheorghe Tătărescu, Octavian Goga, Miron Cristea, Armand Călinescu, Gheorghe Argeşanu, Constantin Argetoianu, Ion Gigurtu, Ion Antonescu
- Born: 15 October 1893; Peleș Castle, Sinaia, Kingdom of Romania
- Died: 4 April 1953 (aged 59); Estoril, Portuguese Riviera, Portugal
- Burial: Royal Pantheon of the Braganzas, Portugal (1953); Curtea de Argeș Cathedral, Romania (2003); The New Archbishopric and Royal Cathedral in Curtea de Argeș, Romania (2019)
- Spouses: Zizi Lambrino (m. 1918; ann. 1919) Helen of Greece and Denmark (m. 1921; div. 1928) Magda Lupescu (m. 1947)
- Issue: 2 illegitimate children with Maria Martini; Carol Lambrino (illegitimate); Michael I of Romania
Names
- Carol Caraiman
- House: Hohenzollern-Sigmaringen
- Father: Ferdinand I of Romania
- Mother: Marie of Edinburgh

Carol II (15 October 1893 [O.S. 3 October 1893] – 4 April 1953) was King of Romania from 8 June 1930 following a coup that deposed his son, until his forced abdication on 6 September 1940. As the eldest son of King Ferdinand I, he was crown prince from 1914 at the death of his granduncle King Carol I, until 1925 when he was forced by a marital scandal to renounce his right to the throne in favor of his son.

Carol's life and reign were beset with controversies, such as his desertion from the army during World War I. Another was his marriage to Zizi Lambrino, who was not of royal lineage. After the dissolution of his first marriage, he married Princess Helen of Greece and Denmark, daughter of King Constantine I of Greece, in March 1921, and later that year they had a son, Michael. Due to his notorious extramarital affair with Elena Lupescu, Carol was forced to renounce his succession rights in 1925. His father removed Carol from the royal house of Romania, and he was exiled to France along with Lupescu. Michael, aged 5, inherited the throne on the death of King Ferdinand in 1927. Princess Helen divorced Carol in 1928.

In the political crisis resulting from the deaths of King Ferdinand and the prime minister and the ineffective regency of Prince Nicholas of Romania, Miron Cristea, and Gheorghe Buzdugan, Carol was allowed to return to Romania in 1930. His name was restored in the royal house of Romania, and he deposed his son and claimed the throne as Carol II. The beginning of his reign was marked by the Great Depression. He weakened parliament, often appointing minority factions of historical parties to the government and attempting to form nationally concentrated governments, such as the Iorga-Argetoianu government. He surrounded himself with a corrupt circle of advisors, including his mistress Lupescu. Another political crisis followed the December 1937 elections, after which no coalition could be formed because of disagreements between the various large political factions. Following this crisis, Carol established a royal dictatorship in 1938 by suspending the 1923 constitution, abolishing all political parties, and forming a National Renaissance Front which consisted mostly of former members of the National Peasants' Party and the National Christian Party whom he had patronized. This government was the last of several attempts to counter the popularity of the fascist Iron Guard.

At the outbreak of World War II, Carol reaffirmed the Polish–Romanian alliance. Poland, which wished to follow the Romanian Bridgehead plan, declined Romanian military assistance. Following the fall of Poland and the involvement of the Soviet Union, Carol maintained a neutrality policy. After the fall of France, he shifted his policy in favor of re-alignment with Nazi Germany in hopes of avoiding a German invasion of Romania. The year 1940 marked the fragmentation of Greater Romania by the cession of Bessarabia and Northern Bukovina to the Soviet Union, Northern Transylvania to Hungary and Southern Dobruja to Bulgaria. Although a German guarantee had been achieved, the cost destroyed Carol's reputation, his regime collapsed and he was forced to abdicate by General Ion Antonescu, the newly appointed Nazi-backed prime minister. Carol was succeeded as king by his son Michael. After his abdication, Carol was permitted to leave the country in a train loaded with 30 truckloads of his royal fortune. In a failed attempt to assassinate Carol, the Iron Guard shot at the train as it was passing through Timișoara station. After World War II, Carol II was forbidden to return by the Western Allies. For the rest of his life, he traveled the world, finally marrying Lupescu in Brazil in 1947. After settling in the Portuguese Riviera, Carol II died peacefully at the age of 59 in exile. King Michael I refused to attend the funeral out of disgust for Carol's treatment of Michael's mother Princess Helen.

== Early life and boyhood in the 1890s ==
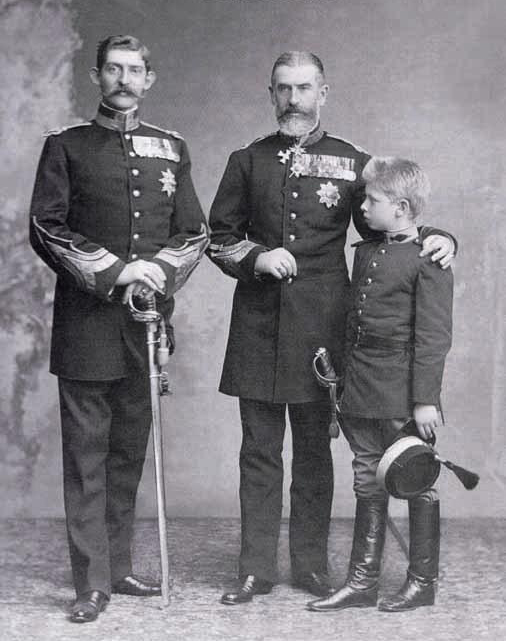
King Carol I of Romania with his nephew the future King Ferdinand and grand-nephew Prince Carol c. 1905.

Carol was born in October 1893 in Peleș Castle as the son of the German-born Crown Prince Ferdinand and the British-born Crown Princess Marie. He was the first male member of the royal family to be born in Romania. However, he spent most of his childhood under the thumb of his domineering great-uncle, King Carol I, who blocked the younger Carol's parents from any role in raising him. Romania in the early 20th century had a famously relaxed "Latin" sexual morality, and Marié had a long series of affairs with various Romanian men with whom she could obtain more emotional and sexual satisfaction than with Ferdinand, who fiercely resented being cuckolded. The stern Carol I felt that Marie was unqualified to raise Prince Carol because of her affairs and her young age, as she was only seventeen when Carol was born, while Marie regarded the King as a cold, overbearing tyrant who would crush the life out of her son.

The childless Carol I, who had always wanted a son, treated Prince Carol as his surrogate son and thoroughly spoiled him, indulging his every whim. Ferdinand was a rather shy and weak man who was easily overshadowed by the charismatic Marie, who became the most loved member of the Romanian royal family. Growing up, Carol felt ashamed of his father, whom both his grand-uncle and mother pushed around. Carol as a child was caught in an emotional tug-of-war between Carol I and Marie, who had very different ideas about how to raise him. The Romanian historian Marie Bucur described the battle between Carol I and Princess Marie as one between traditional 19th-century Prussian conservatism as personified by Carol I versus the 20th-century liberal, modernist, and sexually deviant values of the "New Woman" as personified by Princess Marie. Aspects of both Marie's and Carol I's personalities were present in Carol II. Largely because of the battle between the King and Marie, Carol ended up being both spoiled and deprived of love.

== 1900 - 1921: Early marriages and love affairs ==
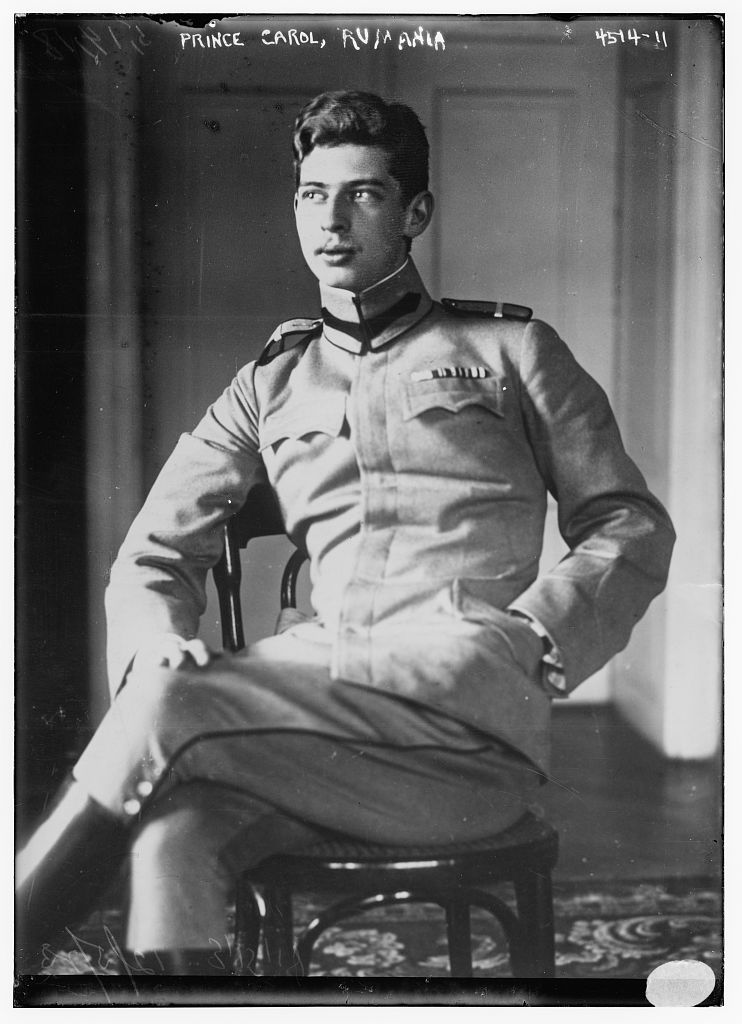
Crown Prince Carol of Romania in 1918

During his teenage years in the first decade of the 1900s, Carol (Romanian for "Charles") acquired the "playboy" image that was to become his defining persona for the rest of his life. Carol expressed some concern at the direction that Prince Carol was taking, as the young Prince's only serious interest was stamp collecting and he spent an inordinate amount of time drinking, partying, and chasing after women. Young Carol fathered at least two illegitimate children by the teenage schoolgirl Maria Martini by the time that he was 19 (in 1912). Carol rapidly became a favorite of gossip columnists around the world owing to the frequent photographs that appeared in the newspapers showing him at various parties with him holding a drink in one hand and a woman in the other.

To teach the prince the value of Prussian virtues, the King had the prince commissioned as an officer in 1913. His time with the 1st Prussian Guards regiment did not achieve the desired results, and Carol remained the "playboy prince". Romania in the early 20th century was an intensely Francophile nation, indeed perhaps the most Francophile nation in the entire world as the Romanian elite obsessively went about embracing all things French as the model for perfection in everything. To a certain extent, Carol was influenced by the prevailing Francophilia, but at the same time, he inherited from Carol I, in the words of the American historian Margaret Sankey, a "profound love of German militarism" and the idea that all democratic governments were weak governments.

Sometime before the First World War, the Romanian and Russian royal families held talks about the marriage of Carol, at that time the heir to the throne of the Kingdom of Romania, to the Grand Duchess Olga Nikolaevna of Russia, the eldest daughter of the Russian emperor at the time, Tsar Nicholas II: Sergey Sazonov, the Foreign Minister of the Russian Empire between 1910 and 1916, wanted Olga to marry Carol to ensure Romania's position as an ally of Russia in the eventuality of a war, as Romania was an ally of Germany at the time. Both royal families, including the Tsar and his wife Alexandra, gave their support for the idea, and there were high expectations that the marriage would take place. However, neither Carol or Olga demonstrated an interest for the other: Carol wasn't fond of Olga's appearance, and Olga expressed her wish to remain in Russia (should the marriage have taken place, Olga would have become the Crown Princess, and later the Queen of Romania). This was best seen during the visit of the Romanian royal family to Russia in March 1914, and during a visit of Nicholas and his family to Romania a few months later.

After the failure of the planned joining of Carol and Olga, the idea of a possible marriage of a Romanian royal to a Russian royal faded until 1917, when Carol began showing interest in the younger sister of Olga, the Grand Duchess Maria Nikolaevna. In a visit to Russia in January of that year, he made a formal proposal to Nicholas for Maria's hand, but Nicholas "good-naturedly laughed the proposal aside", and argued that Maria "was nothing more than a schoolgirl". Maria was only 17 at the time, and shared her older sister's desire to marry a Russian and remain in Russia.

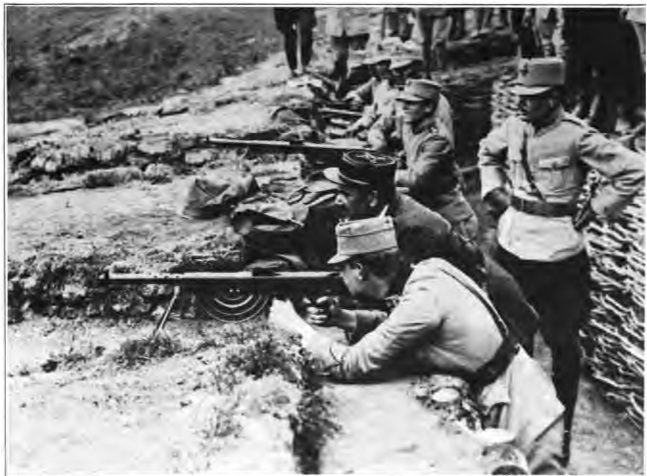
Crown Prince Carol training during World War I with a Chauchat machine gun

In November 1914, Carol joined the Romanian Senate, as the 1866 Constitution guaranteed him a seat there upon reaching maturity. Known more for his romantic misadventures than for any leadership skills, Carol was first married in the Cathedral Church of Odesa, Ukraine, on 31 August 1918 (under the occupation of the Central Powers at that time), to Joanna Marie Valentina Lambrino (1898–1953), known as "Zizi", the daughter of a Romanian general, Constantin Lambrino. The fact that Carol technically had deserted as he left his post at the Army without permission to marry Zizi Lambrino caused immense controversy at the time. The marriage was annulled on 29 March 1919, by the Ilfov County Court. Carol and Zizi continued to live together after the annulment. Their only child, Mircea Gregor Carol Lambrino, was born on 8 January 1920.

On 10 March 1921, Carol next married Princess Helen of Greece and Denmark in Athens, Greece; his new bride was known in Romania as Crown Princess Elena. They were second cousins, both of them great-grandchildren of Queen Victoria, as well as third cousins in descent from Nicholas I of Russia. Helen had known of Carol's dissolute behavior and previous marriage, but her love for him was undeterred. The intent behind this arranged marriage was to help organize a dynastic alliance between Greece and Romania. Bulgaria had territorial disputes with Greece, Romania, and Yugoslavia, and all three of the latter states tended to be close during the interwar period owing to their shared fears of the Bulgarians. Helen and Carol's only child, Michael, was born seven months after their marriage, sparking rumors that Michael was conceived out of wedlock. Apparently close at first, Carol and Helen drifted apart. Carol's marriage with Princess Helen was an unhappy one, and he frequently engaged in extramarital affairs. The elegant wallflower Helen found the bohemian Carol, with his love of heavy drinking and constant partying, rather too wild for her tastes. For his part, Carol disliked royal and aristocratic women, whom he found too stiff and formal, and had an extremely marked preference for commoners, much to the chagrin of his parents. Carol found low-born women to have the qualities that he sought in a woman, such as informality, spontaneity, humor, and passion.

== Controversies surrounding Magda Lupescu (1920s) ==
In the early 1920s, the nascent marriage soon collapsed in the wake of Carol's affair with Elena (Magda) Lupescu (1895–1977), the Roman Catholic daughter of Jewish parents who had converted to Christianity. Magda Lupescu had formerly been the wife of Army officer Ion Tâmpeanu. The National Liberal Party, which dominated Romania's politics, made much of Carol's relationship with Lupescu to argue that he was unqualified to be king. One of the leading figures of the National Liberals was Prince Barbu Știrbey – who was also Queen Marie's lover, and Carol had a strong dislike of Știrbey, who had humiliated his father via his indiscreetly disguised relationship with Marie, and hence of the National Liberals. Knowing that Carol was ill-disposed towards them, the National Liberals waged a sustained campaign to keep him from the throne. The campaign waged by the National Liberals had less to do with disgust with Carol's relationship with Madame Lupescu than with an effort to remove a potential "loose cannon", as Carol made it clear when he succeeded to the throne that he would not be content to let the National Liberals dominate politics in the way that the previous Hohenzollern kings had.

Even without betraying his vows to Helen, Carol could not marry Lupescu and become king, as the constitution barred the crown prince from marrying a Romanian citizen. As a result of the scandal, Carol renounced his right to the throne on 28 December 1925, in favor of his son by Crown Princess Helen, Michael I (Mihai), who became king in July 1927 upon the death of his paternal grandfather, King Ferdinand I. Helen divorced Carol in 1928. After renouncing his right to the throne, Carol moved to Paris, where he lived openly in a common-law relationship with Madame Lupescu. The National Liberal Party was largely a vehicle for the powerful Brătianu family to exercise power and, after the National Liberal prime minister Ion I. C. Brătianu died in 1927, the Brătianus were unable to agree upon a successor, causing the fortunes of the National Liberals to go into decline. In the 1928 elections, the National Peasant Party under Iuliu Maniu won a resounding victory, taking 78% of the vote. As Prince Nicolae, the chief of the Regency Council that governed for King Michael, was known to be friendly with the National Liberals, the new prime minister was determined to dispose of the regency council by bringing back Carol.

== Carol II, the King of Romania from 1930 to 1940 (usurpation of the throne) ==
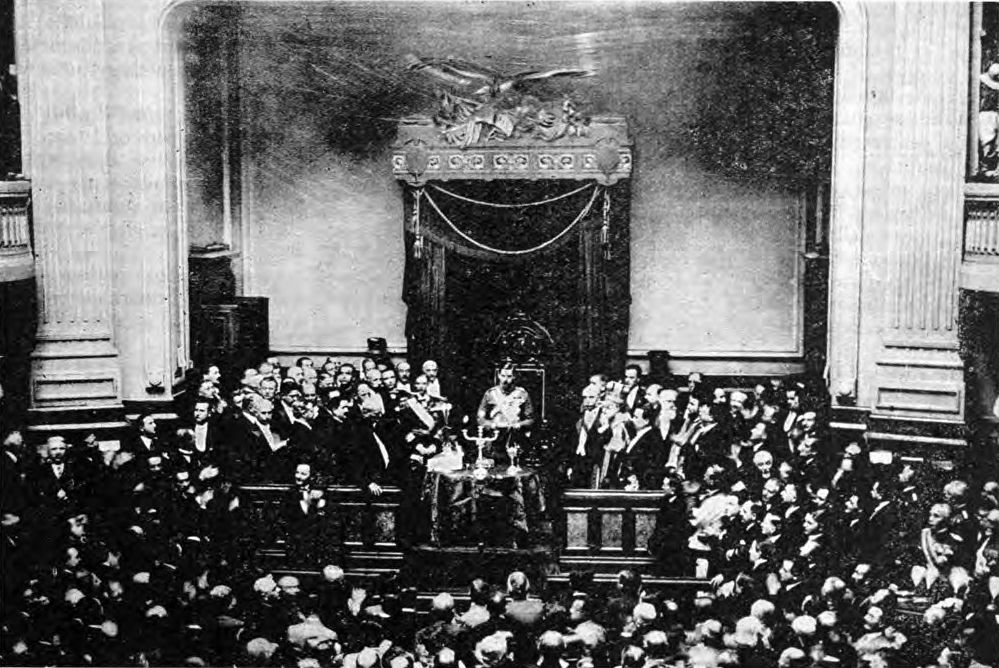
Oath of Carol II in front of parliament, 8 June 1930

Returning to the country on 7 June 1930, in a coup d'état engineered by National Peasant Prime Minister Iuliu Maniu, Carol deposed his son Michael (who was still under a regency due to his minority) and was recognized by the Parliament as king of Romania the following day. For the next decade, he sought to influence the course of Romanian political life, first through manipulation of the rival Peasant and Liberal parties and antisemitic factions, and subsequently (January 1938) through a ministry of his own choosing. Carol also sought to build up his own personality cult against the growing influence of the Iron Guard, for instance, by setting up a paramilitary youth organization known as Straja Țării in 1935. The American historian Stanley G. Payne described Carol as "the most cynical, corrupt and power-hungry monarch who ever disgraced a throne anywhere in twentieth-century Europe". A colorful character, Carol was in the words of the British historian Richard Cavendish: "Dashing, willful and reckless, a lover of women, champagne and speed, Carol drove racing cars and piloted planes, and on state occasions appeared in operetta uniforms with enough ribbons, chains, and orders to sink a small destroyer."

The Romanian historian Maria Bucur wrote about Carol:

Of course, he loved luxury; being born to privilege he expected nothing less than the grand lifestyle he saw in the other courts of Europe. Yet his style was not outlandish or grotesque like Nicolae Ceaușescu's unique brand of kitsch. He liked things large but relatively simple – his royal palace testifies to that trait. Carol's true passions were Lupescu, hunting, and cars and he spared no expense on them. Carol liked to present an impressive and populist persona to the public, wearing garish military uniforms adorned with medals, and being the benefactor of every philanthropic endeavor in the country. He loved parades and grandiose festivals and watched them closely, but he was not taken in by these events as more than shows of his power. He did not take them as a show of sincere popularity as Ceaușescu did during his later years.

Carol had sworn in his coronation an oath to uphold the constitution of 1923, a promise he had no intention of keeping, and right from the start of his reign, the king meddled in politics to increase his own power. Carol was an opportunist with no real principles or values other than the belief that he was the right man to rule Romania and that what his kingdom needed was a modernizing dictatorship. Carol ruled via an informal body known as the camarilla, comprising courtiers together with senior diplomats, army officers, politicians, and industrialists, who were all in some way dependent upon royal favor to advance their careers. The most important member of the camarilla was Carol's mistress, Madame Lupescu, whose political advice Carol greatly valued. Maniu had brought Carol to the throne out of the fear that the regency for Michael I was dominated by National Liberals, who would ensure that their party would always win the elections. Madame Lupescu was deeply unpopular with the Romanian people, and Maniu had demanded that Carol return to his wife, Princess Helen of Greece, as part of the price for being given the throne. When Carol broke his own word and continued to live with Madame Lupescu, Maniu resigned in protest in October 1930 and was to emerge as one of Carol's leading enemies. At the same time, Carol's return had prompted a break in the National Liberals with Gheorghe I. Brătianu breaking away to found a new party, the National Liberal Party-Brătianu that was willing to work with the new king. Despite his dislike of the National Liberals, Maniu's enmity towards Carol left the king with no choice, but to enlist as his allies the break-away factions of the National Liberals against the National Peasants, who demanded that Carol banish Lupescu and return to his wife.

The "Red Queen," as Lupescu was known to the Romanian people on account of the color of her hair, was the most hated woman in 1930s Romania. She was a woman whom ordinary Romanians saw as "the embodiment of evil," in the words of the British historian Rebecca Haynes. Princess Helen was widely viewed as the wronged woman, while Lupescu was seen as the femme fatale who had stolen Carol away from the loving arms of Helen. Lupescu was Roman Catholic, but because of her parents' background, she was widely viewed as Jewish. Lupescu's personality did not win her many friends, as she was arrogant, pushy, manipulative, and extremely greedy, with an insatiable taste for buying the most expensive French clothes, cosmetics, and jewelry. At a time when many Romanians were suffering from the Great Depression in Romania, Carol's habit of indulging Lupescu's expensive tastes caused much resentment, with many of Carol's subjects grumbling that the money would have been better spent on alleviating poverty in the kingdom. Further adding to Lupescu's immense unpopularity, she was a businesswoman who used her connections to the Crown to engage in dubious transactions that usually involved large sums of public money – going into her pocket. However, the contemporary viewpoint that Carol was a mere puppet of Lupescu is incorrect, and Lupescu's influence on political decision-making was much exaggerated at the time. Lupescu was primarily interested in enriching herself to support her extravagant lifestyle and had no real interest in politics, beyond protecting her ability to engage in corruption. Unlike Carol, Lupescu had utterly no interest in social policy or foreign affairs and was such a self-absorbed narcissist that she was unaware of just how unpopular she was with ordinary people. Carol by contrast was interested in the affairs of the state, and though he never sought to deny his relationship with Lupescu, he was careful not to display her too much in public, as he knew that this would bring him unpopularity.

Carol sought to play the National Liberals, the National Peasant Party, and the Iron Guard off against each other with the ultimate aim of making himself master of Romanian politics and disposing of all the parties in Romania. With regards to the Legion of the Archangel Michael, Carol had no intention of ever letting the Iron Guard come to power, but insofar as the Legion was a disruptive force that weakened both the National Liberals and the National Peasants, Carol welcomed the rise of the Iron Guard in the early 1930s, and he sought to use the Legion for his own ends. On 29 December 1933, the Iron Guard assassinated the National Liberal prime minister, Ion G. Duca, which led to the first of several bans placed on the Legion. The assassination of Ion Duca, which was Romania's first political murder since 1862, shocked Carol, who saw the willingness of Codreanu to order the assassination of the Prime Minister as a clear sign that the egomaniacal Codreanu was getting out of control and that Codreanu would not play the role assigned by the king as a disruptive force threatening the National Liberals and National Peasants alike. In 1934, when Codreanu was brought to trial for ordering Duca's assassination, he used as his defense the argument that the entire Francophile elite was completely corrupt and not properly Romanian, and as such, Duca was just another corrupt National Liberal politician who deserved to die. The jury acquitted Codreanu, an act that worried Carol as it showed that Codreanu's revolutionary message that the entire elite needed to be destroyed was winning popular approval. In the spring of 1934, after Codreanu was acquitted, Carol, together with Bucharest police prefect Gavrilă Marinescu and Madame Lupescu, were involved in a half-hearted plot to kill Codreanu by poisoning his coffee, an effort that was abandoned before being attempted. Until 1935, Carol was a leading contributor to the "Friends of the Legion", the group that collected contributions to the Legion. Carol only stopped contributing to the Legion after Codreanu started calling Lupescu a "Jewish whore". Carol's image was always that of "the playboy king", a hedonistic monarch more interested in womanizing, drinking, gambling, and partying, than in affairs of state, and to the extent that he cared about politics, Carol was viewed as a scheming, dishonest man only interested in wrecking the democratic system to seize power for himself.

=== Personality cult ===
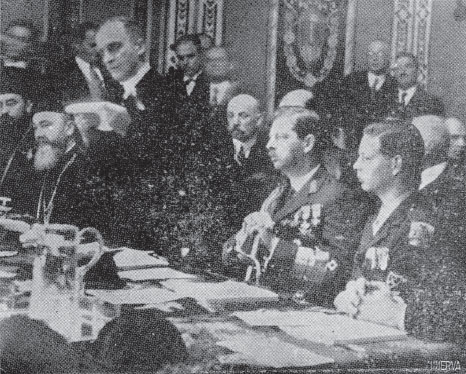
King Carol II and Crown Prince Michael at Astra Congress, 20 September 1936, Blaj, Romania

To compensate for his rather negative and well-deserved "playboy king" image, Carol created a lavish personality cult around himself that grew more extreme as his reign went on, which portrayed the king as a Christ-like being "chosen" by God to create a "new Romania". In the 1934 book The Three Kings by Cezar Petrescu, which was intended for a less educated audience, Carol was constantly described as being almost god-like, the "father of the villagers and workers of the land" and the "king of culture" who was the greatest of all the Hohenzollern kings and whose return from exile from France via airplane in June 1930 was a "descent from the heavens". Petrescu depicted Carol's return as the beginning of his God-appointed task of becoming "the maker of eternal Romania", the start of a glorious golden age as Petrescu asserted that rule by monarchs was what God wanted for Romanians.

Carol had little understanding of or interest in economics, but his most influential economic advisor was Mihail Manoilescu who favored a statist model of economic development with the state intervening in the economy to encourage growth. Carol was very active in the cultural realm, being a generous patron of the arts and actively supporting the work of the Royal Foundation, an organization with a broad mandate to promote and study Romanian culture in all fields. In particular, Carol supported the work of the sociologist Dimitrie Gusti of the Social Service of the Royal Foundation, who in the early 1930s started to bring social scientists from various disciplines like sociology, anthropology, ethnography, geography, musicology, medicine, and biology together in a "science of the nation". Gusti took teams of professors from various disciplines to the countryside to study an entire community from all vantage points every summer, who then produce a lengthy report about the community.

=== Political influence ===
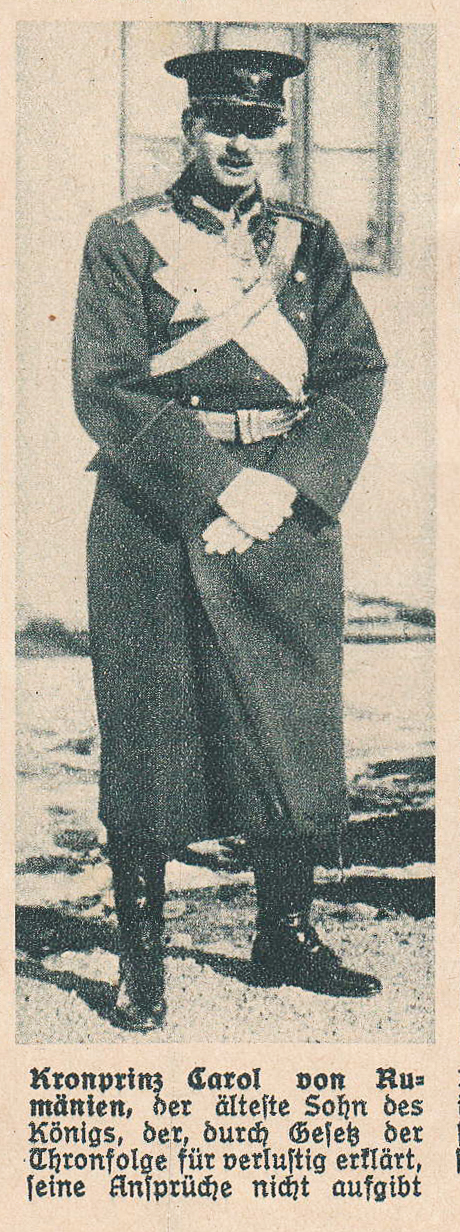
Crown Prince Carol, the future King Carol II of Romania, in 1927

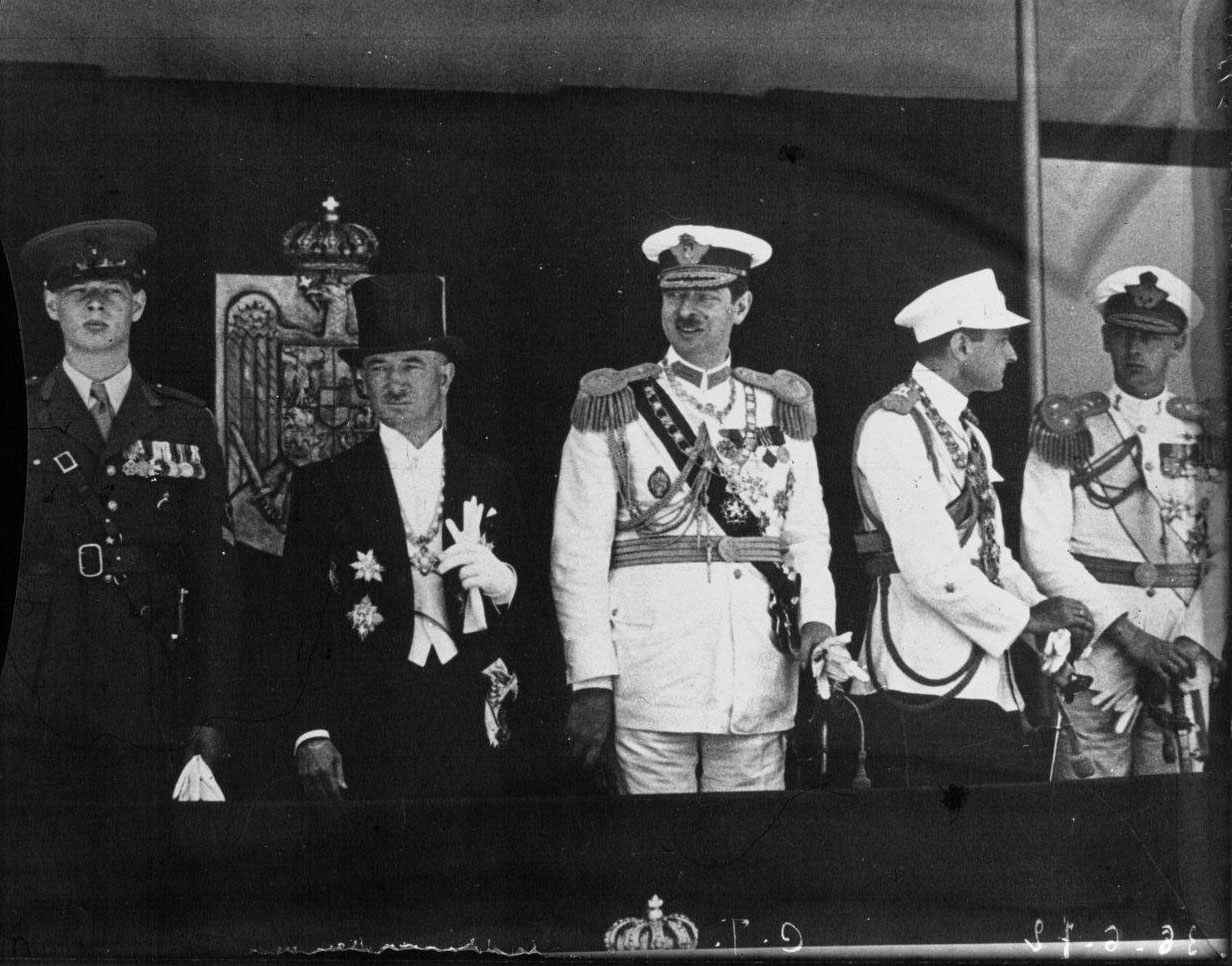
King Carol II, Czechoslovak President Edvard Beneš, Yugoslav regent Prince Paul, Prince Nicholas of Romania and Prince Mihai in Bucharest, 1936

For most of the interwar period, Romania was in the French sphere of influence, and in June 1926, a defensive alliance was signed with France. The alliance with France, together with an alliance with Poland signed in 1921, and the "Little Entente," which united Romania, Czechoslovakia, and Yugoslavia, were the cornerstones of Romanian foreign policy. Starting in 1919, the French sought to create the Cordon sanitaire that would keep both Germany and the Soviet Union out of Eastern Europe. Carol did not seek to replace the foreign policy he had inherited in 1930 at first, as he regarded the continuation of the cordon sanitaire as the best guarantee of Romania's independence and territorial integrity, and as such, his foreign policy was essentially pro-French. At the time that Romania signed the alliance with France, the Rhineland region of Germany was demilitarized, and the thinking in Bucharest had always been that if Germany should commit any act of aggression anywhere in Eastern Europe, the French would begin an offensive into the Reich. Starting in 1930, when the French began to build the Maginot Line along their border with Germany, some doubts started to be expressed in Bucharest about whether the French might actually come to Romania's aid in the event of a German aggression. In 1933, Carol had Nicolae Titulescu, an outspoken champion of collective security under the banner of the League of Nations, appointed foreign minister with instructions to use principles of collective security as the building blocks for creating some sort of security structure intended to keep both Germany and the Soviet Union out of Eastern Europe. Carol and Titulescu personally disliked one another, but Carol wanted Titulescu as a foreign minister as he believed he was the best man for strengthening ties with France and for bringing Great Britain into the affairs of Eastern Europe under the guise of the collective security commitments contained the League Covenant.

The process of Gleichschaltung (coordination) in National Socialist Germany did not extend only to the Reich but was rather thought of by the National Socialist leadership as a worldwide process in which the NSDAP would take control over all of the ethnic German communities around the entire world. The Foreign Policy Department of the NSDAP, headed by Alfred Rosenberg, had attempted to take over the Volk Deutsch (ethnic German) community in Romania starting in 1934, a policy that greatly offended Carol, who regarded this as outrageous German interference in Romania's internal affairs. As Romania had half a million Volk Deutsch citizens in the 1930s, the Nazi campaign to take over the German community in Romania was a real concern for Carol, who feared that the German minority might become a fifth column. In addition, Rosenberg's agents had established contracts with the Romanian extreme right, most notably with the National Christian Party headed by Octavian Goga and less substantial links with the Iron Guard headed by Corneliu Zelea Codreanu, which further annoyed Carol. The American historian Gerhard Weinberg wrote about Carol's foreign policy views: "He admired and feared Germany, but feared and disliked the Soviet Union.". The fact that the first leader to visit Nazi Germany (albeit not in an official capacity) was the Hungarian Prime Minister Gyula Gömbös, who during his visit to Berlin in October 1933 signed an economic treaty that placed Hungary within the German economic sphere of influence – was a source of much alarm to Carol. For the entire interwar period, Budapest refused to recognize the frontiers imposed by the Treaty of Trianon and laid claim to Transylvania region of Romania. Carol, like the rest of the Romanian elite, was worried by the prospect of an alliance of the revisionist states that rejected the legitimacy of the international order created by the Allies in 1918–20, indicating that Germany would support Hungary's claims to Transylvania. Hungary had territorial disputes with Romania, Yugoslavia, and Czechoslovakia, all of which happened to be allies of France. Accordingly, Franco–Hungarian relations were extremely bad during the interwar period, and so – it seemed natural that Hungary would ally itself with France's archenemy, Germany.

In 1934, Titulescu played a leading role in creating the Balkan Entente which brought together Romania, Yugoslavia, Greece, and Turkey in an alliance intended to counter Bulgarian revanchism. The Balkan Entente was intended to be the beginning of an alliance that would bring together all of the anti-revisionist states of Eastern Europe. Like France, Romania was allied to both Czechoslovakia and Poland, but because of the Teschen dispute in Silesia, Warsaw and Prague were bitter enemies. Like the diplomats of the Quai d'Orsay, Carol was exasperated by the bitter Polish-Czechoslovak dispute, arguing that it was absurd for anti-revisionist Eastern European states to be feuding with one another in the face of the rise of German and Soviet powers. Several times, Carol attempted to mediate the Teschen dispute and thus end the Polish-Czechoslovak feud without much success. Reflecting his initially pro-French orientation, in June 1934, when the French foreign minister Louis Barthou visited Bucharest to meet with the foreign ministers of "the Little Entente" of Romania, Czechoslovakia, and Yugoslavia, Carol organized lavish celebrations to welcome Barthou that were made to symbolize the enduring Franco-Romanian friendship between the two "Latin sisters.". The German minister to Romania, Count Friedrich Werner von der Schulenburg complained with disgust in a report to Berlin that everyone in the Romanian elite was an incurable Francophile who told him that Romania would never betray its "Latin sister" France.

At the same time, Carol also considered the possibility that if Romanian-German relations were improved, then perhaps Berlin could be persuaded not to support Budapest in its campaign to regain Transylvania. Further pressing Carol towards Germany was the desperate state of the Romanian economy: even before the worldwide Great Depression, Romania had been a poor country, and the Great Depression hit Romania hard, with Romanians being unable to export much owing to the global trade war set off by the American Smoot-Hawley Tariff Act of 1930, which in turn led to a decline in the value of the Leu as Romania's reserves of foreign exchange were being used up. In June 1934, Romanian finance minister Victor Slăvescu visited Paris to ask the French to inject millions of francs into the Romanian treasury and to lower their tariffs on Romanian goods. When the French refused both requests, an annoyed Carol wrote in his diary that the "Latin sister" France was behaving in a less than sisterly way towards Romania. In April 1936, when Wilhelm Fabricius was appointed German minister in Bucharest, the Foreign Minister Baron Konstantin von Neurath in his instructions to the new minister, described Romania as an unfriendly, pro-French state but suggested that the prospect of more trade with the Reich might bring the Romanians out of the French orbit. Neurath further instructed Fabricius that while Romania was not a major power in a military sense, it was a state of crucial importance to Germany because of its oil.

Carol often encouraged splits in the political parties to his own ends. In 1935, Alexandru Vaida-Voevod, the leader of the Transylvanian branch of the National Peasants, broke away to form the Romanian Front with Carol's encouragement. During the same time, Carol developed close contacts with Armand Călinescu, an ambitious National Peasant leader who founded a faction opposed to the leadership of Carol's archenemy, Iuliu Maniu, and wanted the National Peasants to work with the Crown. In the same way, Carol encouraged the "Young Liberal" faction headed by Gheorghe Tătărescu as a way of weakening the power of the Brătianu family, who dominated the National Liberals. Pointedly, Carol was willing to allow the "Young Liberal" faction under Tătărescu to come to power, but excluded the main National Liberal faction under the leadership of Dinu Brătianu from obtaining power; Carol had not forgotten how the Brătianus had excluded him from the succession in the 1920s.

In February 1935, the Legion's leader, Corneliu Zelea Codreanu, who until then had been regarded as an ally of Carol, for the first time attacked the king directly when he organized demonstrations outside of the royal palace attacking Carol after Dr. Dimitrie Gerota had been imprisoned for writing an article exposing the corrupt business dealings of Lupescu. Codreanu, in his speech before the Royal Palace called Lupescu a "Jewish whore" who was robbing Romania blind, which led to an insulted Carol calling on one of the members of his camarilla, the Bucharest police prefect Gavrilă Marinescu, who sent the police out to break up the Iron Guard rally with much violence.

The doubts about the French willingness to undertake an offensive against Germany were further reinforced by the Remilitarization of the Rhineland in March 1936, which had the effect of allowing the Germans to start building the Siegfried line along the border with France, something that considerably lessened the prospect of a French offensive into western Germany if the Reich should invade any of the states of the cordon sanitaire. A British Foreign Office memo from March 1936 stated that the only nations in the world that would apply sanctions on Germany for remilitarizing the Rhineland if the League of Nations should vote for such a step were Britain, France, Belgium, Czechoslovakia, the Soviet Union, and Romania. In the aftermath of the remilitarization of the Rhineland, and once it was clear that no sanctions were going to be applied against Germany, Carol started to voice his fears that the days of French influence in Eastern Europe were numbered and Romania might have to seek some understanding with Germany to preserve its independence. After continuing the alliance with France, Carol also began a policy of attempting to improve relations with Germany.

On the domestic front, in the summer of 1936, Codreanu and Maniu formed an alliance to oppose the growing power of the Crown and the National Liberal government. In August 1936, Carol had Titulescu fired as foreign minister, and in November 1936, Carol sent the renegade National Liberal politician Gheorghe I. Brătianu to Germany to meet with Adolf Hitler, the Foreign Minister Baron Konstantin von Neurath and Hermann Göring to tell them of Romania's desire for a rapprochement with the Reich. Carol was much relieved when Brătianu reported that Hitler, Neurath, and Göring had all reassured him that the Reich had no interest in supporting Hungarian revanchism and was neutral on the Transylvania dispute. The decoupling of Berlin's campaign to overthrow the international system created by the Treaty of Versailles from Budapest's campaign to overthrow the system created by the Treaty of Trianon was welcome news to Carol, creating the possibility that a greater Germany would not mean a greater Hungary. Göring, the newly appointed chief of the Four Year Plan organization designed to have Germany ready to wage a total war by 1940, was especially interested in Romania's oil and talked much to Brătianu about a new era of German-Romanian economic relations. Germany had almost no oil of its own, and throughout the Third Reich, control of Romania's oil was a key foreign policy goal. Reflecting the changed emphasis, Carol vetoed in February 1937 a plan promoted by France and Czechoslovakia for a new alliance that would formally unite France with the Little Entente and envisioned much closer military ties between the French and their allies in Eastern Europe. Because of its oil, the French were keen to keep the alliance with Romania strong, and because Romania's manpower was a way of compensating the French for their lower population vs. Germany's (the French had 40 million people while Germany had 70 million people). Additionally, it was assumed in Paris that if Germany invaded Czechoslovakia Hungary would also attack Czechoslovakia to regain Slovakia and Ruthenia. French military planners envisioned the role of Romania and Yugoslavia in such a war as invading Hungary to relieve the pressure on Czechoslovakia.

Until 1940, Carol's foreign policy teetered uneasily between the traditional alliance with France and an alignment with the newly ascending power of Germany. In the summer of 1937, Carol told French diplomats that if Germany attacked Czechoslovakia, he would not allow the Red Army transit rights across Romania but was willing to ignore the Soviets if they crossed Romanian airspace on their way to Czechoslovakia. On 9 December 1937, a German-Romanian economic treaty was signed that placed Romania within the German economic sphere of influence but left the Germans unsatisfied as the Reich's enormous demand for oil to power its increasingly large war machine, was not yet fulfilled by the 1937 treaty. Germany had a tremendous need for oil and no sooner had the 1937 agreement been signed than the Germans asked for a new economic treaty in 1938. At the same time that the German-Romanian treaty was signed in December 1937, Carol was receiving the French Foreign Minister Yvon Delbos to show that the alliance with France was not yet dead.

=== The 1937 election and the Goga government ===
In September 1937, Carol paid an extended visit to Paris, during which he indicated to the French Foreign Minister Yvon Delbos that Romanian democracy would soon end. In a campaign speech for the general elections due that December, Corneliu Zelea Codreanu, "Captain" of the Archangel Michael Legion, called for an end to the alliance with France and stated: "I am for a Romanian foreign policy with Rome and Berlin. I am with the states of the National Revolution against Bolshevism. Within forty-eight hours of a Legionary movement victory, Romania will have an alliance with Rome and Berlin". Without realizing it, Codreanu had sealed his doom with that speech. Carol had always insisted that control of foreign policy was his own exclusive royal prerogative, which no one else was allowed to interfere with. Despite the constitution, which stated that the foreign minister was responsible to the prime minister, in practice, the foreign ministers had always reported to the king. By challenging Carol's right to control foreign policy, Codreanu had crossed the Rubicon in the king's eyes and from that time on, Carol was committed to the destruction of the arrogant upstart Codreanu and his movement who had dared to challenge the king's prerogative. In the December 1937 elections, the National Liberal government of Prime Minister Gheorghe Tătărescu won the largest number of seats, but less than the 40% required to form a majority government in parliament. After assassinating Prime Minister Duca in 1933, the Iron Guard had been banned from participating in elections, and to get around the ban Codreanu founded the All for Fatherland! party as a front for the Legion. The All for Fatherland! the party won 16% of the vote in the 1937 election, marking the high point of the Iron Guard's electoral success.

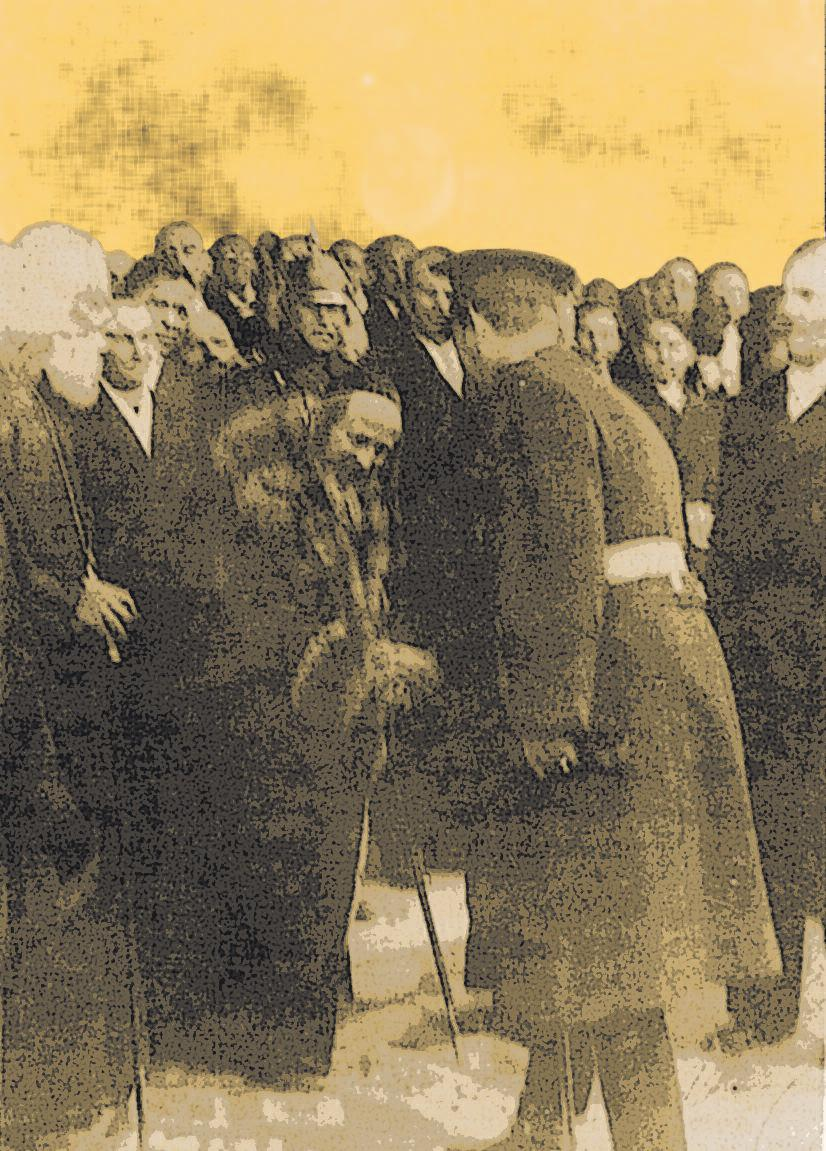
Rabbi Teitelbaum, head of the Satmar Hasidic dynasty greeting King Carol II of Romania, 1936

On 28 December 1937, Carol swore in the radical anti-Semitic poet Octavian Goga of the National Christian Party, which only won 9% of the vote, as prime minister. Carol's reasons for appointing Goga Prime Minister were partly because he hoped that anti-Semitic policies Goga would bring in would win him support from the All for Fatherland! voters and thus weaken the Legion and partly because he hoped that Goga would prove so incompetent as prime minister as to provoke such a crisis that would allow him to seize power for himself. Carol wrote in his diary that the markedly stupid Goga could not possibly last long as prime minister and that Goga's failure would allow him to "be free to take stronger measures which will free me and the country from the tyranny of party interests". Carol agreed to Goga's request to dissolve parliament for new elections on 18, 1938. As leader of the fourth party in parliament, Goga's government was certain to be defeated on a vote of no-confidence when parliament convened as the National Liberals, National Peasants and All for the Fatherland Party had all come out against Goga, albeit for very different reasons. The election got off to a violent start with a brawl in Bucharest between Goga's Lăncieri paramilitary group and the Iron Guard that left two dead, 52 hospitalized and 450 people arrested. The 1938 election was one of the most violent elections in Romanian history, as the Iron Guard and Lăncieri battled one another for control of the streets while seeking to establish their anti-Semitic creditations by assaulting Jews. As Parliament never met during the Goga government, Goga had to pass laws via emergency decree, which all had to be countersigned by the king.

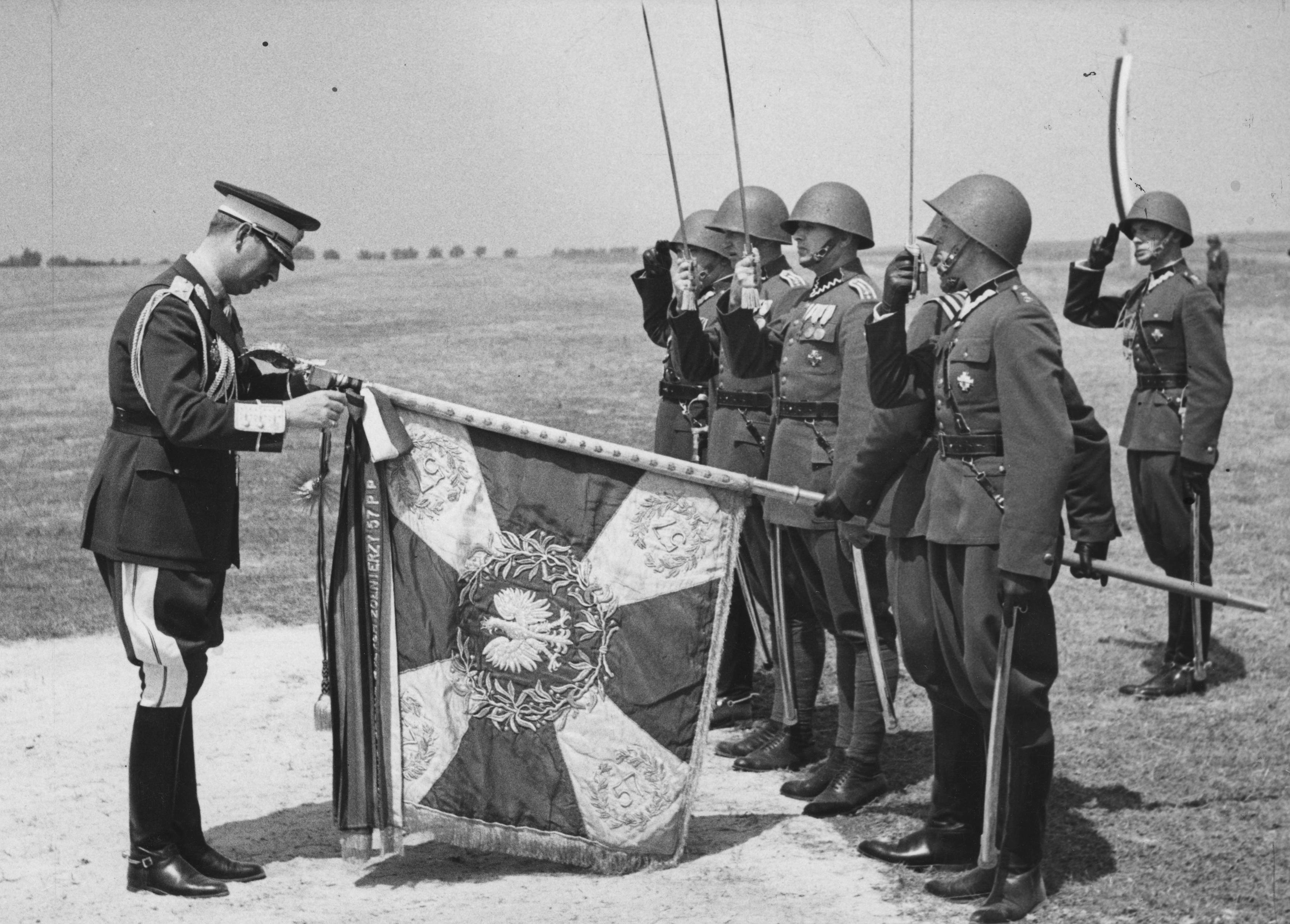
King Carol II and Polish soldiers, 1937

The harsh anti-Semitic policies of the Goga government impoverished the Jewish minority and led to immediate complaints from the British, French and American governments that Goga's policies were going to lead to a Jewish exodus out of Romania. Neither Britain, France, nor the United States had any wish to take in the Jewish refugees that Goga was creating by imposing increasingly oppressive anti-Semitic laws, and all three governments pressed for Carol to dismiss Goga as a way of nipping the developing humanitarian crisis caused by Goga in the bud. The British minister Sir Reginald Hoare and French minister Adrien Thierry both submitted notes of protest against the Goga government's anti-Semitism, while President Roosevelt of the United States wrote a letter to Carol complaining about the anti-Semitic policies he was tolerating. On 12, 1938, Goga stripped all Romanian Jews of their Romanian citizenship, a preparatory move towards Goga's ultimate goal of the expulsion of all Romanian Jews. Carol was personally not an anti-Semite, but in the words of his biographer, Paul D. Quinlan, the king was "simply indifferent" to the sufferings of his Jewish subjects caused by Goga's oppressive anti-Semitic laws. The opportunistic Carol did not believe in antisemitism anymore than he believed in anything else other than power, but if raison d'état meant tolerating an anti-Semitic government as the price of gaining power, Carol was quite prepared to sacrifice the rights of his Jewish subjects. At the same time, Goga proved himself a better poet than politician, and there was a crisis atmosphere in early 1938 as the Goga government, which obsessed with solving the "Jewish Question", to the exclusion of everything else, was clearly floundering. Weinberg wrote about Goga, saying that he was "Unprepared for office and untouched by any leadership ability..." and whose clownish antics left diplomats stationed in Bucharest "half-amused, half-appalled". As Carol had expected, Goga proved to be such an inept leader as to discredit democracy while his anti-Semitic policies ensured that none of the democratic great powers would object to Carol proclaiming a dictatorship.

=== The Royal Dictatorship ===
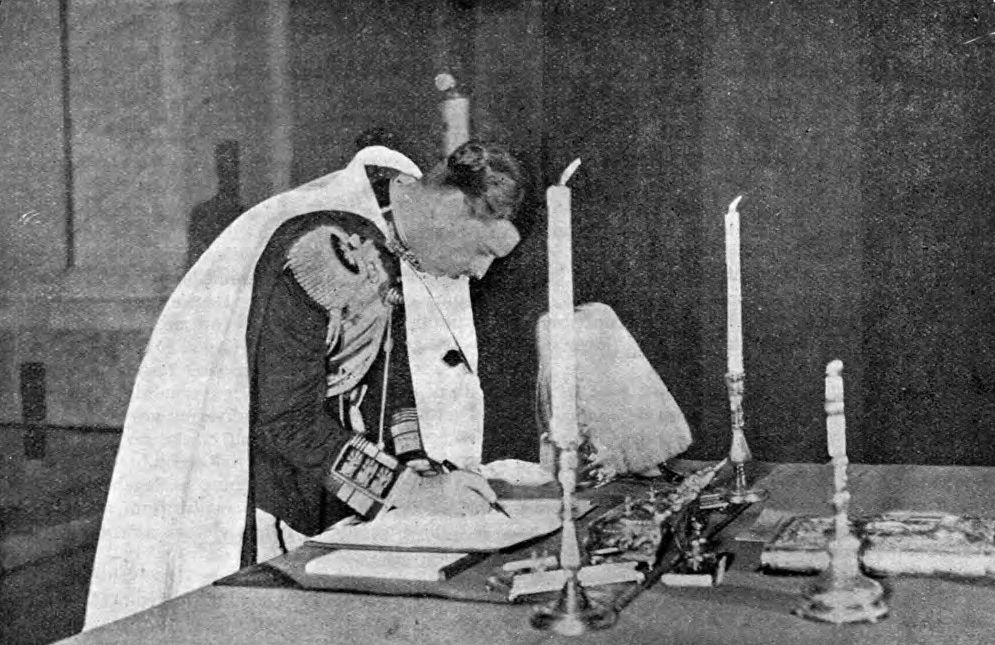
Carol signing the 1938 constitution

Coming to realize belatedly that he was being used by Carol, Goga had a meeting with Codreanu on 8 February 1938, at the house of Ion Gigurtu to arrange for a deal under which the Iron Guard would withdraw its candidates from the election to ensure that the radical anti-Semitic right would have a majority. Carol quickly learned of the Goga-Codreanu pact and used it as the justification for the self-coup he had been planning since late 1937. On 10 February 1938, Carol suspended the Constitution and seized emergency powers. Carol proclaimed martial law and suspended all civil liberties under the grounds that the violent election campaign was at the risk of plunging the nation into civil war.

Having outlived his usefulness, Goga was sacked as prime minister and Carol appointed Patriarch Elie Cristea, the head of the Romanian Eastern Orthodox Church, as his successor. Carol knew he would command wide respect in a country where the majority of the population was Orthodox. On 11, 1938, Carol drafted a new constitution. Although it was superficially similar to its 1923 predecessor, it was actually a severely authoritarian and corporatist document. The new constitution effectively codified the emergency powers Carol had seized in February, turning his government into a de facto legal dictatorship. It concentrated virtually all governing power in his hands, almost to the point of absolute monarchy. The new constitution was approved in a plebiscite held under far-from-secret conditions; voters were required to appear before an election bureau and verbally state whether they approved the constitution; silence was deemed as a "yes" vote. Under these conditions, an implausible 99.87 percent were reported as having approved the new charter, against fewer than 5,500 votes against it.

At the time of his coup in February 1938, Carol informed the German minister Wilhelm Fabricius of his wish for closer ties between his country and Germany. Thierry told Carol in a meeting after the coup that his new government was "well received" in Paris and that the French would not allow the end of democracy to affect their relations with Romania. The new government of Patriarch Cristea did not introduce new anti-Semitic laws but did not repeal the laws passed by Goga either, though Cristea was less extreme about enforcing these laws. When asked by a Jewish friend if his citizenship would be restored now that Goga was gone, Interior Minister Armand Călinescu, who detested the Iron Guard and antisemitism, replied that the Cristea government had no interest in restoring citizenship back to the Jews.

In March 1938, Armand Călinescu, the Interior Minister who had emerged as one of Carol's closet allies and who was to serve as the "strong man" of the new regime, demanded the Iron Guard be finally destroyed. In April 1938, Carol moved to crush the Iron Guard by having Codreanu imprisoned for libeling the historian Nicolae Iorga after Codreanu had published a public letter accusing Iorga of dishonest business dealings. After Codreanu's conviction on 19 April 1938, he was convicted again in a second trial on 27 May 1938, of high treason where he was accused of working in the pay of Germany to affect a revolution since 1935 and sentenced to 10 years in prison.

Carol was made a Stranger Knight Companion of the Order of the Garter in 1938 (the 982nd member since the order's inception) by his second cousin, George VI (King of the United Kingdom). In 1937, he was awarded the Grand Cross of Justice of the Military and Hospitaler Order of Saint Lazarus of Jerusalem and given the Grand Collar of the Order on 16 October 1938. He served as the Grand Bailiwick of the budding Grand Bailiwick of Romania.

Mihai Ralea and Gheorghe Grigorovici at a National Renaissance Front meeting. Behind them is a giant portrait of King Carol II of Romania

Carol, together with the rest of the Romanian elite, was deeply shocked by the Munich Agreement of 30 September 1938, which he saw as allowing all of Eastern Europe to fall within the German sphere of influence. Romania had long been one of the most Francophile nations in the world, which meant that the effects of Munich were felt especially strongly there. Weinberg wrote about the effect of Munich on Franco-Romanian relations: "In view of the traditional ties going back to the beginnings of Romanian independence and manifested in the way in which the Romanian elite looked to France as the model for everything from fashion to government, the revelation of France's abdication was particularly shocking." In October 1938, the Iron Guard had begun a terrorist campaign of assassinating police officers and bureaucrats and staging bombings of government offices as part of an effort to overthrow Carol. Carol struck back hard, ordering the police to arrest Iron Guardsmen without warrant and to summarily execute those found with weapons.

In view of Germany's desperate need for oil and the repeated German requests for a new economic agreement that would allow for more Romanian oil to be shipped to the Reich, Carol met Fabricius to tell him that he wanted such an agreement to create a lasting understanding between Germany and Romania. At the same time, in October–November 1938, Carol was playing a double game and appealed to Britain for help, offering to place Romania within the British economic sphere of influence, and visited London between 15 and 20 November to hold unsuccessful talks on that subject. On 24 November 1938, Carol visited Germany to meet with Hitler to improve German-Romanian relations. During the talks for the new German-Romanian economic agreement, which was signed on 10 December 1938, Weinberg wrote that "Carol made the needed concessions, but he demonstrated his concern for his country's independence by driving a very hard bargain.". The British historian D.C. Watt wrote that Carol had a "trump card" in his control of the oil Germany needed so badly and that the Germans were willing to pay a very high price for Romanian oil, without which their military could not function. During his summit with Hitler, Carol was much offended when Hitler demanded that Carol free Codreanu and appoint him prime minister. Carol believed that as long as Codreanu lived, there was a possible alternative leadership in Romania for Hitler to back, and that if this possibility was eliminated then Hitler would have no choice other than to deal with him.

Carol had initially planned to keep Codreanu in prison, but after the terrorist campaign began in October 1938, Carol agreed to Călinescu's plan drawn up in the spring to murder all of the Iron Guard leaders in custody. On the night of 30 November 1938, Carol had Codreanu and 13 other Iron Guard leaders murdered, with the official story being that they were "shot while trying to escape.". The killings on the night of 30 November 1938, which saw much of the Iron Guard's leadership wiped out, have gone down in Romanian history as "the night of the vampires.". The Germans were much offended by the murder of Codreanu and for a period in late 1938 waged a violent propaganda campaign against Carol, with German newspapers regularly running stories casting doubt about the official version of events that Codreanu had been "shot while trying to escape" while calling Codreanu's murder "a victory for the Jews," but ultimately economic concerns, especially the German need for Romanian oil caused the Nazis to get over their outrage over the killings of the Iron Guard leaders by early 1939, and relations with Carol soon went back to normal.

In December 1938, the National Renaissance Front was formed as the country's only legal party. That same month, Carol appointed his friend since childhood and another member of the camarilla, Grigore Gafencu as foreign minister. Gafencu was appointed foreign minister partly because Carol knew he could trust Gafencu and partly because of Gafencu's friendship with Colonel Józef Beck, the Polish foreign minister, as Carol wanted to strengthen ties with Poland. Gafencu was to prove himself something of an opportunist as foreign minister, the man who always wanted to take the path of least resistance, in marked contrast to Armand Călinescu, the tough, "almost freakish-looking," diminutive, one-eyed Interior Minister (and soon to be prime minister) who proved himself a consistent opponent of fascism both in Romania and abroad and encouraged Carol to stand with the Allies.

Carol's foreign policy going into 1939 was to strengthen Romania's alliances with Poland and the Balkan Entente, work to avoid conflicts with Romania's enemies Hungary and Bulgaria, and encourage Britain and France to get involved in the Balkans while trying to avoid giving offense to Germany. On 6 March 1939, the Patriarch Cristea died and was replaced as prime minister by Călinescu.

In February 1939, Göring dispatched his deputy Helmuth Wohlthat of the Four Year Plan organization to Bucharest with instructions to sign yet another German-Romanian economic treaty that would allow Germany total economic dominance over Romania, especially its oil industry. That Wohlthat, the number two-man in the Four-Year Plan organization, was sent to Bucharest indicated the importance of the German-Romanian talks. Carol had resisted German demands for more oil in the December 1938 agreement and instead had succeeded by early 1939 in placing Romania to a certain extent within the British economic sphere of influence. To counterbalance the increasingly powerful German influence in the Balkans, Carol wanted closer ties with Britain. At the same time, the Four-Year Plan was running into major difficulties by early 1939, and in particular, Göring's plans to have synthetic oil plants that would make oil from coal were well behind schedule. The new technology of making synthetic oil from lignite coal had run into major technical problems and cost overruns, and Göring had been informed in early 1939 that the synthetic oil plants whose construction had started in 1936 would not be operative by 1940 as planned. It was not until the summer of 1942 that Germany's first synthetic oil plants finally started operating. It was painfully obvious to Göring in the first months of 1939 that the German economy would not be ready to support a total war by 1940 as the Four-Year Plan of 1936 had envisioned while at the same time his economic experts were telling him the Reich needed to import 400,000 tons of oil per month while Germany had in fact imported only 61,000 tons of oil per month in the last four months of 1938.

In 1938, Romania produced 6.6 million tons of crude oil, 284,000 tons of crude steel, 133,000 tons of pig iron, 510,000 tons of cement and 289,000 tons of rolled steel.

Hence Wohlthat demanded during his talks with Romanian Foreign Minister Grigore Gafencu that Romania nationalize their entire oil industry, which was henceforth controlled by a new corporation owned jointly by the German and Romanian governments, while demanding Romania "respect German export interests" by only selling their oil to Germany. In addition, Wohlthat demanded a host of other measures that, to all practical purposes, would have converted Romania into a German economic colony. As Carol had no intention of giving in to these demands, the talks in Bucharest went very badly. It was at this point that Carol began what became known as the "Tilea affair" when, on 17 March 1939, Virgil Tilea, the Romanian minister in London, burst unexpectedly into the office of the British Foreign Secretary, Lord Halifax in an agitated state to announce that his country was faced with an imminent German invasion and asked Halifax for British support. At the same time, Carol mobilized five infantry corps on the Hungarian border to guard the supposed invasion. The British "economic offensive" in the Balkans was causing Germany very real economic pain as the British bought up Romanian oil that the Germans badly needed, hence their demands for control of the Romanian oil industry that so offended Carol. As the British believed in Tilea's claims, the "Tilea affair" had an immense impact on British foreign policy and led to the Chamberlain government changing from appeasement of Germany to a policy of "containing" the Reich. Carol denied, unconvincingly, knowing anything about what Tilea was up to in London, but the British warnings to Germany against invading Romania in March 1939 led the Germans to relax their demands, and the latest German-Romanian economic treaty signed on 23 March 1939, was, in the words of Watt "very vague". Despite the "Tilea affair", Carol had decided that he would refuse to become involved in any diplomacy that would force him to decisively choose between Germany and Britain, and he would never accept any support from the Soviet Union to deter Germany.

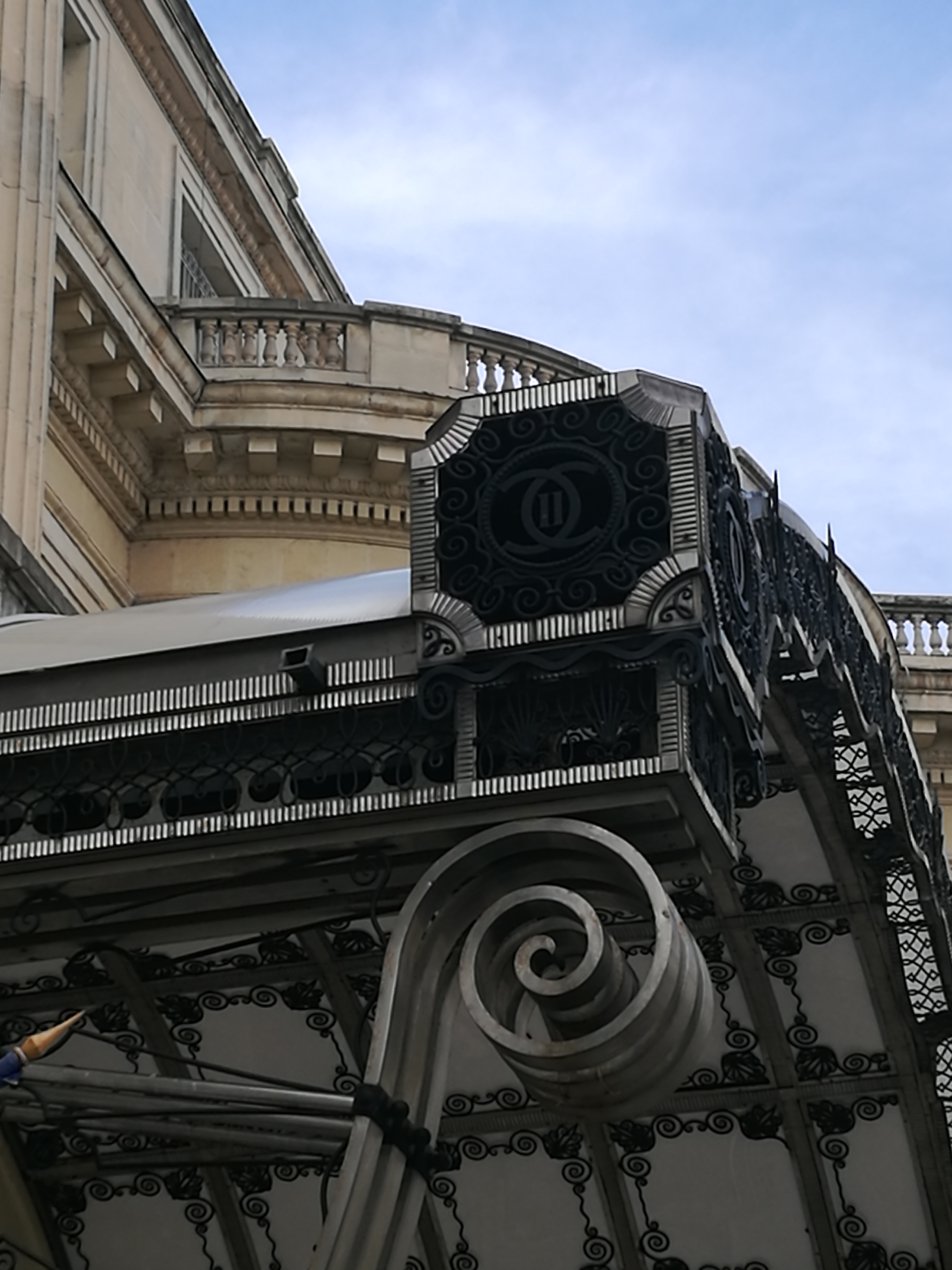
Royal Palace, Bucharest: one of the only known remaining royal cyphers of King Carol II – 2 crisscrossed C's containing 2 parallel bars, all within a circle

As part of their new policy of seeking to "contain" Germany starting in March 1939, the British sought the construction of the "peace front," which was to comprise at a minimum Britain, France, Poland, the Soviet Union, Turkey, Romania, Greece and Yugoslavia. For his part, Carol was obsessed with fears in the first half of 1939 that Hungary, with German support, would soon attack his kingdom. On 6 April 1939, a cabinet meeting decided that Romania would not join the "peace front" but would seek Anglo-French support for its independence. The same meeting decided that Romania would work to strengthen ties with other Balkan nations but would seek to prevent the Anglo-French efforts to link the security of the Balkans to the security of Poland. On 13 April 1939, the British prime minister Neville Chamberlain speaking in the House of Commons and the French Premier Édouard Daladier speaking in the Chamber of Deputies, announced a joint Anglo-French "guarantee" of the independence of Romania and Greece. Carol promptly accepted the "guarantee.". On 5 May 1939, the French Marshal Maxime Weygand visited Bucharest to meet with Carol and his prime minister, Armand Călinescu to discuss Romania's possible participation in the "peace front.". Both Carol and Călinescu were supportive but evasive, saying that they would welcome having the Soviet Union fight against Germany, but would never allow the Red Army to enter Romania even if Germany should invade. Carol told Weygand: "I do not wish to let my country be engaged in a war which would result, in a few weeks, in the destruction of its army and the occupation of its territory...We do not wish to be the lightning conductor for the coming storm". Carol went on to complain that he had enough equipment for only two-thirds of his army, which also lacked tanks, anti-aircraft guns, heavy artillery and anti-tank guns while his air force had only about 400 antiquated aircraft of French manufacture that were no match for latest German aircraft. Weygand reported to Paris that Carol wanted Anglo–French support, but would not fight for the Allies if war came.

On 11 May 1939, an Anglo-Romanian agreement was signed under which Britain committed itself to grant Romania a credit of £5 million pound sterling and promised to buy 200,000 tons of Romanian wheat at above-market prices. When Yugoslavia reacted negatively to the Anglo-Turkish Declaration of 12 May 1939, promising to "ensure the establishment of security in the Balkans" and threatening to pull out of the Balkan Pact, Gafencu had a summit with Yugoslav Foreign Minister Aleksandar Cincar-Marković on 21 May 1939, at the Iron Gates to ask the Yugoslavs to stay in the Balkan Pact. However, Cincar-Marković's talk of leaving the Balkan Pact turned out to be a ploy by the Yugoslav Regent, Prince Paul, who was backing a plan mooted by the Turkish Foreign Minister Şükrü Saracoğlu to have Bulgaria join the Balkan Pact in exchange for Romania ceding part of the Dobruja region. In a letter to Carol, Paul stated that he wanted the Bulgarians "off my back" as he was afraid of the Italians building up their forces in their new colony of Albania and asked his friend to make this concession for him. Carol stated in response that it was out of the question for him to cede any territory to Bulgarians, partly because he was against giving any of his realm on principle and partly because to cede the Dobrudja would only encourage the Hungarians to renew their claims on Transylvania.

Despite his formal opposition to joining the "peace front," Carol did decide to strengthen the Balkan Entente, especially to strengthen ties with Turkey. Since Britain and France were working for an alliance with Turkey while at the same time holding talks with the Soviet Union, Carol reasoned that if Romania was to be firmly allied to Turkey, this would be a way of associating Romania with the emerging "peace front" without actually joining it. Despite the way in which Carol disappointed Paul, he very much wanted to strengthen Yugoslav-Romanian relations as Yugoslavia was one of Romania's few friendly neighbors. He was awarded the Yugoslav Order of Karađorđe's Star. To resist Bulgarian claims on the Dubrujda, Carol also wanted better relations with Bulgaria's archenemy, Greece.

In July 1939, Carol had a major clash with Fritz Fabritius, the leader of the Nazified German National Party, which was the largest of the Volk Deutsch parties and which joined the National Renaissance Front in January 1939. Fabritius had taken to calling himself the Führer, had formed two paramilitary groups, the National Workers Front and the German Youth, and was holding ceremonies in which members of Romania's 800,000 strong German minority had to swear personal oaths of loyalty to him. In early July, Fabritius, during a visit to Munich, gave a speech in which he stated that the Romanian Volk Deutsch were loyal to Germany, not Romania, and spoke of his wish to see a "Greater German Reich," which would be secured by armed peasant settlements along the Carpathians, Ural, and Caucasus mountains. In this Grossraum (a German word meaning roughly "greater space"), only Germans would be allowed to live, and those not willing to be Germanized would have to leave. In response to this speech, when Fabritius returned to Romania, he was summoned to a meeting with Călinescu on 13 July, who told him that the king was going to take action against him. Fabritius promised to behave, but was expelled from Romania shortly afterwards when one of his staffers accidentally left on a train a briefcase full of documents showing Fabritius's supporters were arming themselves and that Führer Fabritius was being financed by Germany.

In July 1939, Carol heard rumors that Hungary, supported by Germany, was planning on invading Romania following a new crisis in Romanian-Hungarian relations caused by complaints from Budapest that the Romanians were mistreating the Magyar minority in Transylvania (which were supported by Berlin). The king then ordered a general mobilization of his military forces while departing in the royal yacht for Istanbul. During his unexpected trip to Istanbul, Carol held talks with the Turkish President İsmet İnönü and the Turkish Foreign Minister Şükrü Saracoğlu during which the Turks promised him that Turkey would immediately mobilize its military in the event of an Axis attack on Romania. The Turks, in their turn, pressed Carol to sign an alliance with the Soviet Union, something that Carol said very reluctantly he might do if the Turks were to serve as the middlemen and if the Soviets were to promise to recognize the border with Romania. The show of Romanian resolve, supported by Turkey had the effect of causing the Hungarians to back off on their demands against Romania.

Carol, who had sought to play-off both sides against each other, was alarmed when learned about the Molotov-Ribbentrop pact in August 1939. Carol allowed Călinescu to tell Thierry that the Romanians would destroy their oil fields if the Axis invaded, while Gafencu told the German Foreign Minister Joachim von Ribbentrop of his firm friendship with Germany, his opposition to the "peace front," and his desire to sell more oil to the Germans. After the German-Soviet non-aggression pact was signed, Călinescu advised Carol: "Germany is the real danger. An alliance with it is tantamount to a protectorate. Only Germany's defeat by France and Britain can ward off the danger.". On 27 August 1939, Gafencu told Fabricius that Romania would declare neutrality if Germany invaded Poland and that he wanted to sell to Germany some 450,000 tons of oil per month in exchange for 1.5 million Reichsmark and several modern German aircraft. Carol met with the German air force attaché on 28 August 1939 to congratulate the Germans on the great diplomatic success they had achieved in signing the non-aggression pact with the Soviet Union. The German–Soviet pact was a blessing for Carol since Germany now had access to Soviet oil, which reduced the pressure on Romania. However, unknown to Carol, the pact contained "secret protocols" which assigned the Romanian region of Bessarabia to the Soviet Union.

== World War II (Carol's struggle over Romanian neutrality) ==
When World War II began with German-Soviet Invasion of Poland in September 1939, Carol proclaimed neutrality. In doing so, Carol technically violated the letter of the treaty of alliance with Poland signed in 1921 and the spirit of treaty of alliance signed with France in 1926. Carol justified his policy under the grounds that, with Germany and the Soviet Union allied in the Molotov–Ribbentrop pact of August 1939 and France holding its forces behind the Maginot line, unwilling to start an offensive into Germany, that neutrality was his only hope of preserving his kingdom's independence. For its part, the Polish government was more interested in weapon deliveries from its Western allies through Romanian ports, but this became insignificant following Poland's defeat on the battlefield. As usual with Carol, he sought to play a careful balancing act between the Allies and the Axis, on one hand signing a new economic treaty with Germany while on the other hand allowing for a considerable period of time for the Polish troops to cross into Romania while declining to intern them as international law required. Instead, the Poles were allowed to travel to Constanța to board ships to take them to Marseille to continue the fight against Germany from France. The Romanian Bridgehead remained a key escape route for thousands of Poles in the desperate days of September 1939. It was only after receiving a number of furious complaints from Fabricius about the passage of Polish soldiers across Romania that Carol finally started to intern the fleeing Poles.

=== Fall 1939: Călinescu assassinated and Romania maintains neutrality ===
On 21 September 1939, Prime Minister Călinescu was assassinated by the Iron Guard in a plot organized out of Berlin, thus silencing the strongest pro-Allied voice amongst Carol's camarilla. The next day, the nine assassins of Călinescu were publicly shot without the benefit of a trial and on the week of 22–28 September 1939, 242 members of the Iron Guard were the victims of extrajudicial executions. Because of its oil, Romania was highly important by both sides, and during the Phoney War of 1939–40 there occurred what Weinberg called a "silent struggle over Romania's oil," with the German government doing everything within its power to have as much Romanian oil as possible while the British and French governments equally doing everything possible to deny it. The British launched an unsuccessful campaign to sabotage Romanian oil fields and the transportation network that took Romanian oil to Germany. In January 1940, Carol broadcast a speech to proclaim that it was his brilliant handling of foreign policy that kept Romania neutral and safe from danger. He also announced that he was going to be building a gigantic defense line around the kingdom, and as such, taxes would have to rise to pay for it. Romanians called the proposed line the Imaginet Line, as the line was considered to be a purely imaginary version of the Maginot line and many of Carol's subjects suspected that the money raised by higher taxes would go to the king's Swiss bank accounts.

=== May 1940: Romania sides with the Axis ===
Carol had hedged his bets about whether to choose between the Allies and the Axis. It was only in late May 1940, when France was clearly losing the war that Carol swung decisively over to the Axis side. During the later period of the Phoney War, after waging a campaign of bloody repression against the Iron Guard, which reached its peak after Călinescu's assassination, Carol began a policy of reaching out to the surviving Iron Guard leaders. Carol felt that a "tamed" Iron Guard could be used as a source of popular support. In April 1940, Carol had reached an agreement with Vasile Noveanu, the leader of the underground Iron Guard in Romania, but it was not until early May 1940 that Horia Sima, the leader of the Iron Guards in exile in Germany, could be persuaded to support the government. On 26 May 1940, Sima returned to Romania from Germany to begin talks with General Mihail Moruzov of the secret service about the Iron Guard joining the government. On 28 May 1940, after learning of the surrender of Belgium, Carol told the Crown Council that Germany was going to win the war, and Romania accordingly needed to realign its foreign and domestic policies with the victors. On 13 June 1940, an agreement was reached whereas the Iron Guard would be allowed to join the National Renaissance Front in exchange for more and harsher anti-Semitic laws. The National Renaissance Front was reorganized as the Party of the Nation, which was described as "a single and totalitarian party under the supreme leadership of His Majesty, King Carol II." On 21 June 1940, France signed an armistice with Germany. Romania's elite had been so obsessively Francophile for so long that France's defeat had the effect of discrediting that elite in the eyes of public opinion and led to an upswing of popular support for the pro-German Iron Guard.

=== Summer 1940: Soviets commandeer Bessarabia ===
In the midst of the turn towards the Iron Guard and Germany came a bombshell from abroad. On 26 June 1940, the Soviet Union submitted an ultimatum demanding that Romania hand over the Bessarabia region (which had been Russian until 1918) and the northern part of Bukovina (which had never been Russian) to the Soviet Union and threatened war within the next two days if the ultimatum was rejected. Carol had at one moment considered following the example of Finland in 1939 when faced with a similar Soviet ultimatum, but the outcome of the Winter War was scarcely an inspiring example. Carol at first considered rejecting the ultimatum, but upon being informed that the Romanian Army would be no match for the Red Army, agreed to cede Bessarabia and northern Bukovina to the Soviet Union. Carol appealed to Berlin for support against the Soviet ultimatum, only to be told to comply with Stalin's demands. The loss of the regions without any fighting to the Soviet Union was felt to be a national humiliation by the Romanian people and was a huge blow to Carol's prestige. Carol's personality cult had by 1940 reached such extreme heights that the withdrawal without any resistance from Bessarabia and northern Bukovina revealed that Carol was a mere man after all, and so badly dented his prestige more than would have been the case if Carol had maintained a more modest image.

On 28 June 1940, Sima entered the cabinet as Under-Secretary of State at the Ministry of Education. On 1 July 1940, Carol, in a radio speech, renounced both the 1926 alliance with France and the 1939 Anglo-French "guarantee" of Romania, saying that henceforth Romania would seek its place in the German-dominated "New Order" in Europe. The next day, Carol invited a German military mission to train the Romanian Army. On 4 July 1940, Carol was sworn into a new government headed by Ion Gigurtu with Sima as Minister of Arts and Culture. Gigurtu had been a leading figure in the anti-Semitic National Christian Party in the 1930s, was a millionaire businessman with many connections to Germany, and was a well-known Germanophile. For all these reasons, Carol hoped that having Gigurtu as prime minister would win him Hitler's goodwill and thus prevent any further loss of territory. Along the same lines, Carol signed a new economic treaty with Germany on 8 August 1940, that finally gave the Germans the economic dominance of Romania and its oil that they had been seeking all through the 1930s.

=== Summer 1940: Bulgarians and Hungarians seek territory from Romania ===
Immediately afterwards, inspired by the Soviet example of gaining Romanian territory, the Bulgarians demanded the return of Dobruja, lost in the Second Balkan War of 1913, while the Hungarians demanded the return of Transylvania, lost to Romania after World War I. Romania and Bulgaria opened talks that led to the Treaty of Craiova, which saw the southern Dobruja ceded to Bulgaria. In particular, Carol proved unwilling to cede Transylvania, and had it not been for the diplomatic intervention of Germany and Italy, Romania and Hungary would have gone to war with each other in the summer of 1940. In the meantime, Carol imprisoned General Ion Antonescu after the latter had criticized the king, charging that it was the corruption of the royal government that was responsible for the military backwardness of Romania and hence the loss of Bessarabia. Both Fabricius and Hermann Neubacher, the man in charge of the Four Year Plan's operations in the Balkans, intervened with Carol, saying that Antonescu's "accidental death" or being "shot while trying to escape" would "make a very bad impression on the German headquarters," as Antonescu was known to be a leading advocate of an alliance with Germany. On 11 July 1940, Carol had Antonescu freed, but kept under house arrest at the Bistrița monastery.

=== Hitler offers Romania a guarantee against further territorial losses ===
Hitler was alarmed about the possibility of a Hungarian-Romanian war, which he feared might result in the destruction of Romania's oil fields and/or might lead to the Soviets intervening to seize all of Romania. At this time, Hitler was already seriously considering invading the Soviet Union in 1941, and if he were to take such a step, he would need Romanian oil to power his military. At the Second Vienna Award of 30 August 1940, the German Foreign Minister Joachim von Ribbentrop and the Italian Foreign Minister Count Galeazzo Ciano ruled that northern Transylvania was to go to Hungary while southern Transylvania would stay with Romania, a compromise that left both Budapest and Bucharest deeply unhappy with the Vienna award. For economic reasons, Romania was far more important to Hitler than was Hungary, but Romania had been allied to France since 1926 and had flirted with joining the British-inspired "peace front" in 1939, so Hitler who personally disliked and mistrusted Carol – felt that Romania deserved to be punished for waiting so long to align with the Axis. After the fall of Paris in June 1940, the Germans had captured the archives of the Quai d'Orsay and were thus well-informed about the double-line that Carol had pursued until the spring of 1940. Hitler was annoyed with Carol's efforts to forge closer ties with France at the same time proclaiming his friendship towards Germany. At the same time, Hitler offered Carol a "guarantee" of the rest of Romania against further territorial losses, which Carol promptly accepted.

=== September 1940: The road to abdication ===
The acceptance of the Second Vienna Award completely discredited Carol with his people, and in early September 1940 enormous demonstrations broke out all over Romania demanding that Carol abdicate. On 1 September 1940, Sima (who had resigned from the government) gave a speech calling upon Carol to abdicate, and the Iron Guard began to organize demonstrations all over Romania to press for his abdication.

==== Antonescu discussed as prime minister; Carol to remain as king ====
On 2 September 1940, Valer Pop, a courtier and an important member of the camarilla first advised Carol to appoint General Ion Antonescu as prime minister as the solution to the crisis. Pop's reasons for advising Carol to have Antonescu as prime minister was partly because Antonescu – who was known to be friendly with the Iron Guard and had been imprisoned under Carol – was believed to have enough of an oppositional background to appease the public and partly because Pop knew that Antonescu for all his Legionary sympathies was a member of the elite and would never turn against it. As the increasingly large crowds started to assemble outside of the royal palace demanding the king's abdication, Carol considered Pop's advice, but was reluctant to have Antonescu as prime minister. As more and more people started to join the protests, Pop feared that Romania was on the verge of a revolution that might not only sweep away the king's regime, but also the elite who had dominated the country since the 19th century. To apply further pressure on Carol, Pop met with Fabricius on the night of 4 September 1940 to ask him to tell Carol that the Reich wanted Antonescu as prime minister, which led to Fabricius promptly calling Carol to tell him to appoint the general as the prime minister. Additionally, the very ambitious General Antonescu who long coveted the premiership now suddenly started to downplay his long-standing antipathy to Carol, and he suggested that he was prepared to forgive past slights and disputes.

==== Antonescu becomes prime minister; forced abdication of Carol ====
On 5 September 1940, Antonescu became prime minister, and Carol transferred most of his dictatorial powers to him. As prime minister, Antonescu was a man acceptable to both the Iron Guard and the traditional elite. Carol planned to stay as king after appointing Antonescu and initially Antonescu did not support the popular demand for Carol's abdication. Antonescu had become prime minister, but he had a weak political base. As an Army officer, Antonescu was a loner, an arrogant and aloft man with an extremely bad temper who as a consequence was very unpopular with his fellow officers. Antonescu's relations with the politicians were no better, and as such Antonescu was initially unwilling to move against the king until he had some political allies. Carol ordered Antonescu and General Dumitru Coroamă who commanded the troops in Bucharest to shoot down demonstrators in front of the royal palace, an order that both refused to obey. It was only on 6 September 1940, when Antonescu learned of a plot to murder him headed by another member of the camarilla General Paul Teodorescu that Antonescu joined the chorus demanding Carol's abdication. With public opinion solidly against him and with the Army refusing to obey his orders, Carol was forced to abdicate.

Concerning the claim of the American historian Larry Watts that it was Carol that allied Romania to Nazi Germany and that Marshal Ion Antonescu had unwillingly inherited an alliance with Germany in 1940, the Canadian historian Dov Lungu wrote:

[Watts's] claim that Romania's de facto alliance with Germany under Antonescu was the work of Carol, who began laying its foundations for it as early as 1938, is wide off the mark. Carol's concessions to Germany were made half–heartedly and delayed as much as possible in the hope that the western powers would regain the initiative on the political-diplomatic front and, from September 1939, the military one. He finally did change his country's external economic and political orientation, but only in the spring of 1940, when German hegemony on the Continent seemed imminent. In addition, there is more than a subtle distinction between Carol's request in the last weeks of his rule for the dispatch of a German military mission to train the ill–prepared Romanian Army and Antonescu's decision almost immediately after assuming power to fight on Germany's side until the very end. In fact, in his desire to regain the province of Bessarabia, Antonescu was keener than the Germans' in Romania's participation in an anti-Soviet war.

== 1940 departure from Romania and Exile ==
Forced under Soviet and subsequently Hungarian, Bulgarian, and German pressure to surrender parts of his kingdom to foreign rule, he was finally outmaneuvered by the pro-German administration of Marshal Ion Antonescu, and abdicated in favour of Michael in September 1940. He escaped from Spain into Portugal (While in Portugal, he stayed in Estoril, at Casa do Mar e Sol.), and then announced on March 29, 1941 that they would make their home in Cuernavaca, Mexico (50 miles outside of Mexico City).

=== 1941: Mexico-based "Free Romania" Campaign ===
With Cuernavaca as his home base, Carol tried to set up a Free Romania movement based in Mexico to overthrow General Antonescu. Carol had hopes that his Free Romania movement would be recognized as a government-in-exile and would ultimately lead to him being restored. The closest Carol ever got to having his Free Romania movement recognized came in 1942 when President Manuel Ávila Camacho allowed Carol to stand beside him while reviewing his troops. Carol would have liked to operate out of the United States, but the American government refused him permission to enter. However, Carol was in contact with two Eastern Orthodox priests living in Chicago, Father Glicherie Moraru and Father Alexandru Opreanu, who organized an unsuccessful campaign in the Romanian-American community to pressure the American government to recognize the "Free Romania" committee as the legitimate government of Romania.

=== Appeals to Romanians in the USA ===
To advance his cause, Carol published a magazine in America called The Free Romanian and published several books in both Romanian and English. A major problem for Carol's efforts to mobilize the Romanian American community was the Immigration Control Act of 1924, which drastically limited immigration from Eastern Europe into the United States. As such, the majority of Romanian Americans in the 1940s were either persons who immigrated prior to 1924 or their children; in either case, Carol did not mean much to them. Furthermore, many Romanian Americans were Jews who had neither forgiven nor forgotten that it was Carol who had appointed the anti-Semitic fanatic Goga as prime minister in 1937. To improve his image amongst Jews, Carol persuaded Leon Fischer, the former vice-president of the United Romanian Jews of America, to write articles on his behalf in American Jewish magazines that portrayed the former king as the friend and protector of the Jews and an enemy of anti-Semitism. The reaction to Fischer's articles was overwhelmingly negative with a flood of letters to the editor who complained bitterly that it was Carol who signed in all of Goga's laws that took away Romanian citizenship from Jews and made it illegal for Romanian Jews to own land and shares in public companies and work as lawyers, doctors, teachers, etc. Furthermore, the writers of the letters noted that Carol allowed these laws to remain on the statute books after dismissing Goga and sarcastically commented that if Carol was the best friend of the Jews in Romania, then Romanian Jews certainly did not need enemies.

=== Seeking recognition of Free Romania committee as a "government-in-exile" (Tilia vs Carol) ===
Carol's offers to have his Free Romania committee recognized as a government-in-exile was hindered by his unpopularity in his own homeland with many British and American diplomats arguing that supporting the former king was likely to increase public support for General Antonescu. Beyond that, there was a rival Free Romania committee headed by Viorel Tilea based in London that wanted to have nothing to do with Carol's committee in Mexico City. Virgil Tilea had as a university student in the 1930s supported the Iron Guard. Unusually for a Romanian in this period, Tilea was an Anglophile rather a Francophile, and had attended Cambridge University as an exchange student. Tilea's time in Britain changed his political views as he later stated that seeing many different types of people living in harmony in Britain made him realize that it was not necessary for one ethnic group to dominate all the others as Codreanu had proclaimed, leading him to break with Iron Guard. When General Antonescu was sworn in as prime minister as the new "National Legionary State", Tilea resigned as Romanian minister in London in protest at the appointment. Later in 1940, Tilea formed his Free Romania committee in London that attracted support from a number of Romanians who fled the Antonescu regime into exile.

=== British response to rival Free Committees ===
Tilea's Free Committee was not officially recognized by the British government, but was known to have the support of Britain and to be very close to the Polish government-in-exile, which was a major reason why the British spurned the Carol's rival Free Romania committee based in Mexico City, which tended to attract support only from those Romanians who been closely associated with the king's camarilla. Tilea's committee had an office in Istanbul which regularly sent couriers to a safe house in Bucharest, where messages were exchanged with one of Carol's former prime ministers Constantin Argetoianu who in turn acted as an emissary for those opposed to Antonescu. Argetoianu reported that King Michael was opposed to the Antonescu regime and wanted to stage a coup d'état to depose Antonescu, waiting only for the Allies to invade the Balkans. General Antonescu was the dictator, but Romanian army officers took their oath of loyalty to the king, so there was reason to believe in London that the Romanian Army would side with the king against the prime minister if the two came into conflict. From the British viewpoint, associating themselves with Carol's campaign to once again depose his own son would only complicate their dealings with King Michael.

=== Marriage in Brazil in 1947; exiled from Romania for the rest of his life ===
Carol and Magda Lupescu were married in Rio de Janeiro, Brazil, on 3 June 1947, Magda calling herself Princess Elena von Hohenzollern. In 1947 after the Communist take-over of Romania, a Romanian National Committee was set up to oppose the Communist regime. Carol's efforts to join the Romanian National Committee were rebuffed as all the factions were opposed to him, and Romanian monarchists on the committee made it clear that they regarded King Michael, not his father as the legitimate king of Romania. Carol remained in exile for the rest of his life. He was never to see his son, King Michael, after his 1940 departure from Romania. Michael could see no point in meeting his father who had humiliated his mother so many times via his open affairs and did not attend his funeral.

== 1953 Death in Portugal ==
Carol died in Estoril, on the Portuguese Riviera in 1953. His coffin was placed inside the Pantheon of the House of Braganza in Lisbon.

== Remains returned to Romania in the 2000s ==
His remains were finally returned to the Curtea de Argeș monastery in Romania in 2003, the traditional burial ground of Romanian royalty, at the request and expense of the government of Romania (led by Adrian Năstase). They initially lay outside the cathedral, the burial place of Romanian kings and queens, as Elena was not of royal blood. Neither of his sons participated in either ceremony. King Michael I was represented by his daughter, Crown Princess Margareta, her husband, Prince Radu and two grandchildren Nicolae de Roumanie-Medforth-Mills and Karina de Roumanie Medforth-Mills.

In January 2018, it was announced that the remains of King Carol II would be moved to the new Archdiocesan and Royal Cathedral, along with those of Princess Helen. In addition, the remains of Prince Mircea would also be moved to the new cathedral. His remains were at the time interred at the Bran Castle's Chapel. King Carol II of Romania was reburied at the New Episcopal and Royal Cathedral in Curtea de Argeș on 8 March 2019.

Carol Lambrino was forbidden (since 1940) from entering Romanian territory, but a Romanian court declared him a legitimate son in 2003. Carol visited Bucharest in November 2005, shortly before his death.

== Archives ==
Young Prince Carol's letters to his grandfather, Leopold of Hohenzollern-Sigmaringen, are preserved in the Hohenzollern-Sigmaringen family archive, which is in the State Archive of Sigmaringen (Staatsarchiv Sigmaringen) in the town of Sigmaringen, Baden-Württemberg, Germany. There are also letters from young Carol (together with letters from his mother, Crown Princess Marie) to his great-grandmother, Josephine of Baden, preserved in the State Archive of Sigmaringen (Staatsarchiv Sigmaringen).

Carol II of Romania's letters to Zizi Lambrino as well as documents about their marriage are preserved in the "Jeanne Marie Valentine Lambrino Papers" collection in the Hoover Institution Archives (Stanford, California, US).

== In popular culture ==
Carol appears as a character [as Prince Carol] in the final episode of the third season of Mr. Selfridge, where he is played in a cameo appearance by British actor Anton Blake.

Carol is also considered to be the inspiration for the character Prince Charles of Carpathia in the 1953 play The Sleeping Prince and the 1957 related film The Prince and the Showgirl. "Ex-King Carol Weds Lupescu" was front-page news next to an article announcing a downed flying saucer in Roswell, New Mexico.

He makes an appearance in the 2019 film Marie, Queen of Romania as an antagonist along with his mistress.

== Ancestry ==
Ancestors of Carol II of Romania

8. Karl Anton, Prince of Hohenzollern
4. Leopold, Prince of Hohenzollern
9. Princess Josephine of Baden
2. Ferdinand I of Romania
10. Ferdinand II of Portugal
5. Infanta Antónia of Portugal
11. Maria II of Portugal
1. Carol II of Romania
12. Prince Albert of Saxe-Coburg and Gotha
6. Alfred, Duke of Saxe-Coburg and Gotha
13. Victoria of the United Kingdom
3. Princess Marie of Edinburgh
14. Alexander II of Russia
7. Grand Duchess Maria Alexandrovna of Russia
15. Princess Marie of Hesse and by Rhine

== See also ==
- European interwar dictatorships
- List of covers of Time magazine (1930s)

== Bibliography ==
- Ancel, Jean (2011). The History of the Holocaust in Romania. Lincoln: University of Nebraska Press.
- Binder-Iijima, Edda; Löwe, Heinz-Dietrich; Volkmer, Gerald, eds. (2010). Die Hohenzollern in Rumänien 1866–1947. Eine monarchische Herrschaftsordnung im europäischen Kontext [The Hohenzollerns in Romania 1866–1947: A monarchical system of rule in a European context]. Studia Transsylvanica (in German). Vol. 41. Köln: Böhlau Verlag. ISBN 978-3-412-20540-9.
- Bucur, Marie (2007). "Carol II". In Fischer, Bernd Jürgen (ed.). Balkan Strongmen: Dictators and Authoritarian Rulers of South Eastern Europe. West Lafayette: Purdue University Press. pp. 87–118.
- Crǎciun, Boris (1997). Regii și Reginele României : O istorie ilustrata a Casei Regale [The Kings and Queens of Romania: An Illustrated History of the Royal House] (in Romanian). Iași: Editura Porțile Orientului. ISBN 973-97442-2-2.
- Crampton, Richard (1997). Eastern Europe in the Twentieth Century and After. London: Routledge.
- Haynes, Rebecca (October 1999). "Germany and the Establishment of the Romanian National Legionary State, September 1940". The Slavonic and East European Review. 77 (4): 700–725.
- Haynes, Rebecca (January 2007). "Reluctant Allies? Iuliu Maniu and Corneliu Zelea Codreanu against King Carol II of Romania". The Slavonic and East European Review. 85 (1): 105–134. doi:10.1353/see.2007.0040. S2CID 140433520.
- Herman, Eleanor (2009). Sex with the Queen. New York: HarperCollins. p. 262-266.
- Hillgruber, Andreas (1976). "Karl II. (Carol II.)". Biographisches Lexikon zur Geschichte Südosteuropas (in German). Vol. 2. Oldenburg, München. pp. 369–371. ISBN 3-486-47871-0.
- Hitchins, Keith (1994). Rumania 1866-1947. Oxford history of modern Europe. Oxford: Oxford University Press. ISBN 9780198221265.
- Kroner, Michael (2004). Die Hohenzollern als Könige von Rumänien : Lebensbilder von vier Monarchen 1866–2004 [The Hohenzollerns as Kings of Romania: Biographies of four monarchs 1866–2004] (in German). Heilbronn: Johannis-Reeg-Verlag. ISBN 978-3-937320-30-4.
- Leitz, Christian (May 1997). "Arms as Levers: 'Matériel' and Raw Materials in Germany's Trade with Romania in the 1930s". The International History Review. 19 (2): 312–332. doi:10.1080/07075332.1997.9640786.
- Lungu, Dov (September 1988). "The French and British Attitudes towards the Goga-Cuza Government in Romania, December 1937 – February 1938". Canadian Slavonic Papers. 30 (3): 323–341. doi:10.1080/00085006.1988.11091891.
- Muzeul Naţional de Istorie a României (2009). Familia regala. O istorie in imagini [The Royal Family. A History in Images] (in Romanian). Cetatea de Scaun. ISBN 978-973-8966-97-0.
- Payne, Stanley G. (1996). A History of Fascism, 1914–1945. Routledge. ISBN 0203501322.
- Petraru, Marius (2013). "The History of the Romanian National Committee". In Lynn, Katalin Kadar (ed.). The Inauguration of 'Organized Political Warfare': The Cold War Organizations Sponsored by the National Committee for a Free Europe / Free Europe Committee. Budapest: Helena History Press. pp. 121–197. JSTOR 10.7829/j.ctt5hgzmc.
- Quinlan, Paul D. (1995). The Playboy King : Carol II of Romania. Contributions to the Study of World History. Westport, Connecticut: Greenwood Press. ISBN 9780313295195.
- Sankey, Margaret (2014). "Carol II". In Hall, Richard (ed.). War in the Balkans: An Encyclopedic History from the Fall of the Ottoman Empire to the Breakup of Yugoslavia. Santa Barbara: ABC-CLIO. pp. 63–64.
- Watt, Donald Cameron (1989). How War Came. New York: Pantheon Books.
- Weinberg, Gerhard (1970). The Foreign Policy of Hitler's Germany: Diplomatic Revolution in Europe 1933–36. Chicago: University of Chicago Press.
- Weinberg, Gerhard (1980). The Foreign Policy of Hitler's Germany: Starting World War II 1937–1939. Chicago: University of Chicago Press.
- Weinberg, Gerhard (2005). A World In Arms. Cambridge: Cambridge University Press.
- Weinberg, Gerhard (2013). The Foreign Policy of Hitler's Germany. New York: Enigma Books.

Carol II of Romania House of Hohenzollern-Sigmaringen Cadet branch of the House of Hohenzollern Born: 15 October 1893 Died: 4 April 1953
Regnal titles
Preceded by Michael I	King of Romania; 8 June 1930 – 6 September 1940	Succeeded by Michael I
