= Marie of Romania =

Queen of Romania from 1914 to 1927

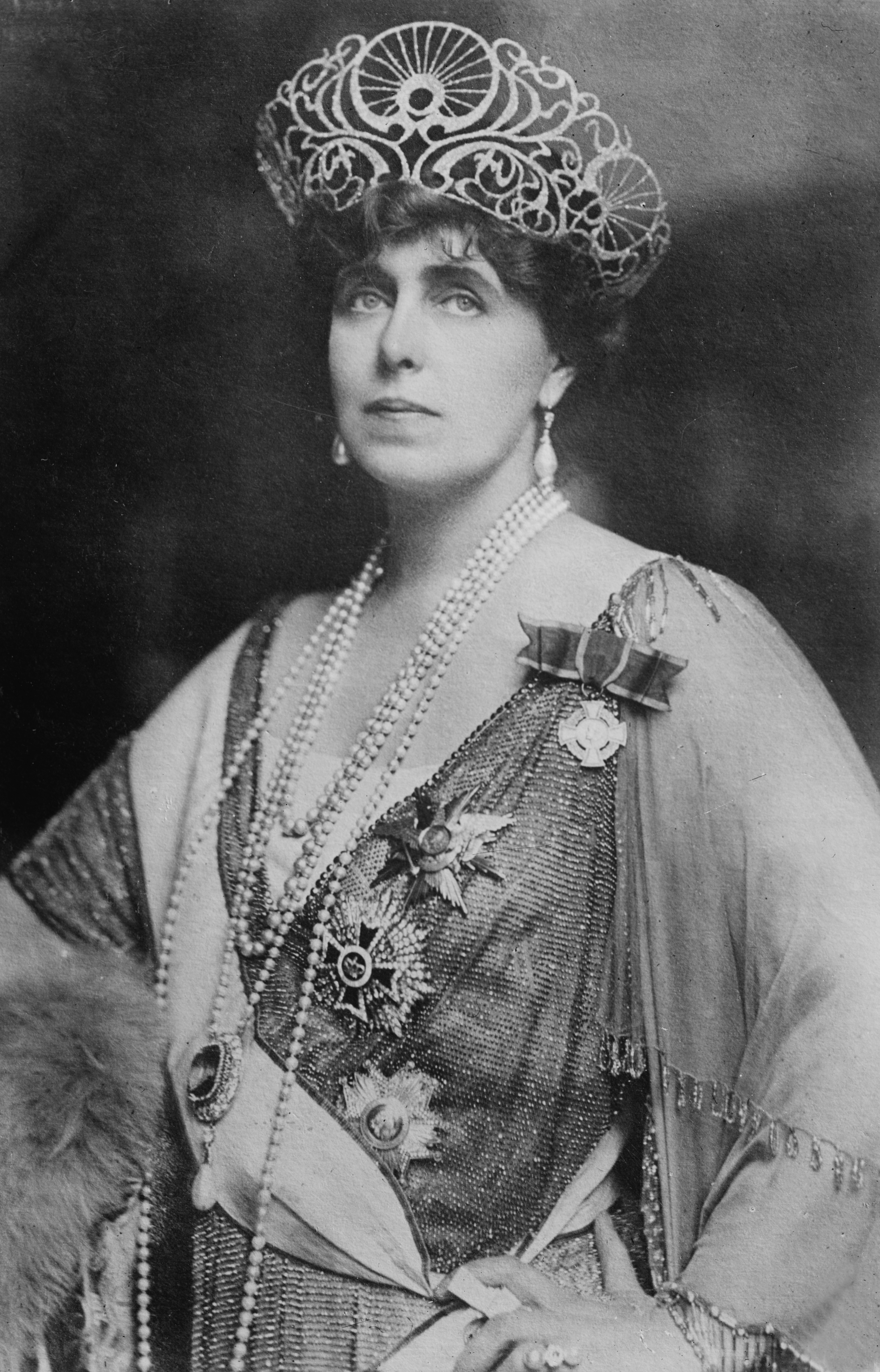
- Marie c. 1920–1925

Queen consort of Romania
- Tenure: 10 October 1914 – 20 July 1927
- Coronation: 15 October 1922
- Born: Princess Marie of Edinburgh; 29 October 1875; Eastwell Park, Kent, England
- Died: 18 July 1938 (aged 62); Pelișor Castle, Sinaia, Romania
- Burial: 24 July 1938; Curtea de Argeș Cathedral
- Spouse: Ferdinand I of Romania (m. 1893; died 1927)
- Issue: Carol II of Romania; Elisabeth, Queen of the Hellenes; Maria, Queen of Yugoslavia; Nicholas, Prince Regent of Romania; Princess Ileana of Romania; Prince Mircea of Romania
Names
- Marie Alexandra Victoria
- House: Saxe-Coburg and Gotha
- Father: Alfred, Duke of Saxe-Coburg and Gotha
- Mother: Grand Duchess Maria Alexandrovna of Russia

Marie (Romanian: Maria; born Princess Marie of Edinburgh; 29 October 1875 – 18 July 1938) (Note: All dates in this article use the Gregorian calendar, which was not in use in Romania until 1919. The Julian calendar which Romania then used was 12 days behind before 1900 and 13 days behind after 1900.) was the last queen consort of Romania from 10 October 1914 to 20 July 1927 as the wife of King Ferdinand I.

Marie was born into the British royal family. Her parents were Prince Alfred, Duke of Edinburgh (later Duke of Saxe-Coburg and Gotha), and Grand Duchess Maria Alexandrovna of Russia. Marie's early years were spent in Kent, Malta and Coburg. After refusing a marriage proposal from her cousin, the future King George V, she was chosen in 1892 to marry Ferdinand, then crown prince of Romania, and they wed the next year. Marie was crown princess between 1893 and 1914, and became immediately popular with the Romanian people.

Upon the outbreak of World War I, Marie urged Ferdinand to ally himself with the Triple Entente and declare war on Germany, which he eventually did in 1916. During the early stages of fighting, the national capital Bucharest was occupied by the Central Powers. Marie, Ferdinand and their five children took refuge in Western Moldavia. There, she and her three daughters acted as nurses in military hospitals, caring for soldiers who were wounded or afflicted by cholera. After the war, on 1 December 1918, the historical region of Transylvania, following Bessarabia and Bukovina, united with the Old Kingdom of Romania. Marie, now queen of Greater Romania, attended the Paris Peace Conference of 1919, where she campaigned for international recognition of the enlarged Romania. In 1922, she and Ferdinand were crowned in a specially-built cathedral in the ancient city of Alba Iulia in an elaborate ceremony which mirrored their status as queen and king of a united state.

As queen, Marie was very popular, both in Romania and abroad. In 1926, she undertook a diplomatic tour of the United States, alongside her children Nicholas and Ileana. They were received enthusiastically by the people and visited several cities before returning to Romania. There, Marie found that Ferdinand was gravely ill and he died a few months later. Now queen dowager, Marie refused to be a member of the regency council that ruled over the country during the minority of her grandson, King Michael. In 1930, Marie's eldest son, the father of King Michael, Carol, who had been forced in 1925 to renounce his rights to succession, deposed his son and usurped the throne, becoming King Carol II. He removed Marie from the political scene and strove to crush her popularity. As a result, Marie left Bucharest and spent the rest of her life either in the countryside or at Balchik Palace, her summer residence in Southern Dobruja by the Black Sea. She became ill with cirrhosis in 1937 and died the following year.

Following Romania's transition to a People's Republic, the monarchy was excoriated by communist officials. Several biographies of the royal family described Marie as a drunkard or as a promiscuous woman, referring to her many alleged affairs and to orgies she had supposedly organised before and during the war. In the years preceding the Romanian Revolution of 1989, Marie's popularity recovered and she was presented to the population as a model of patriotism. She is primarily remembered for her work as a nurse, and is also known for her extensive writing, including her critically acclaimed autobiography.

== Early life (1875–1893) ==
=== Birth ===
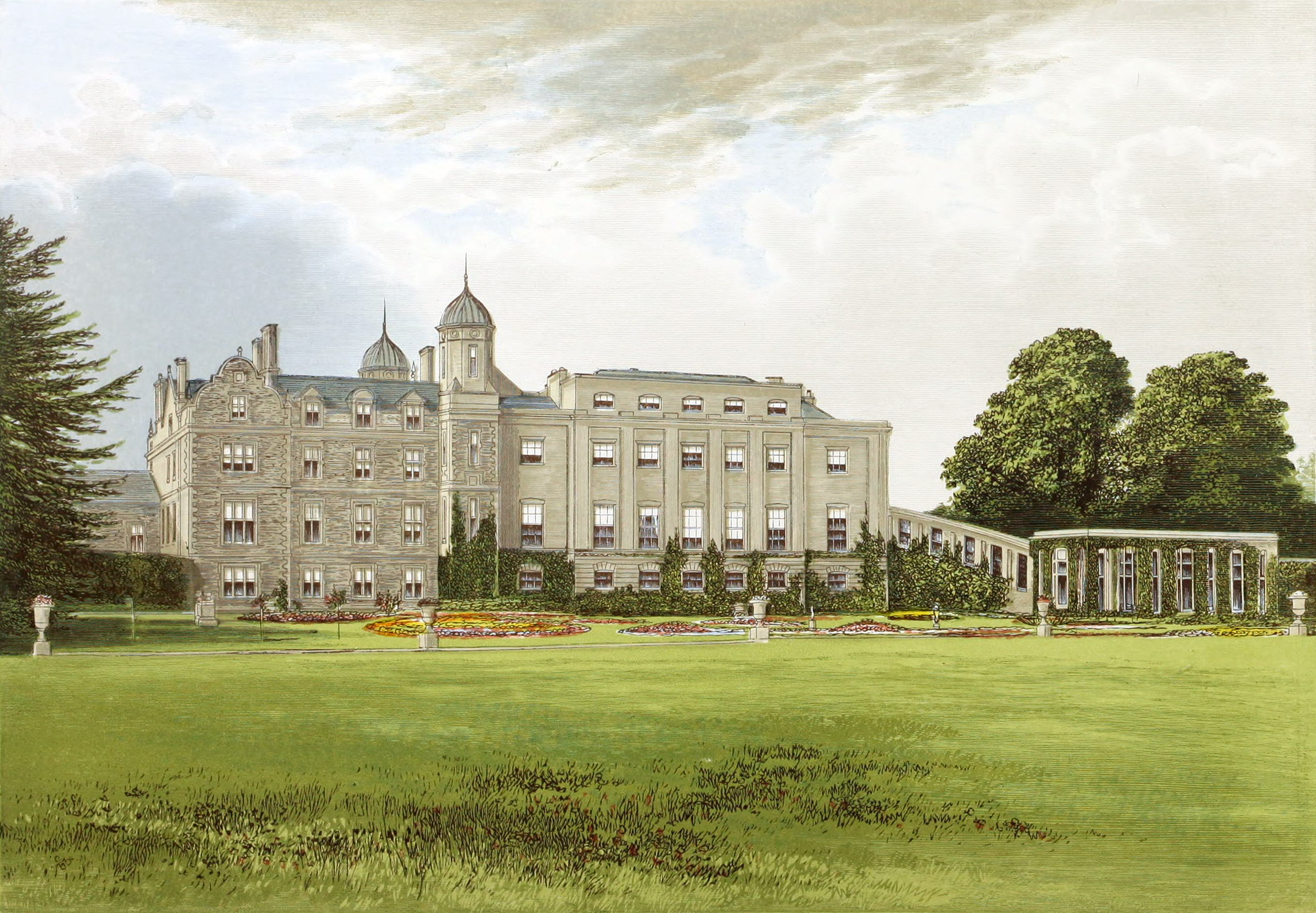
Eastwell Park as it appeared between 1843 and 1894 (south facade)

Marie was born at 10:30 am on 29 October 1875 at her parents' residence, Eastwell Manor in Kent, with her father present. She was the eldest daughter and second child of Prince Alfred, Duke of Edinburgh, and the former Grand Duchess Maria Alexandrovna of Russia, respectively the son of Queen Victoria and the daughter of Emperor Alexander II. Her birth was celebrated by firing the Park and Tower guns. She was named Marie Alexandra Victoria after her mother and grandmothers, and she was informally known as "Missy". The Duke of Edinburgh wrote that his daughter "promises to be as fine a child as her brother and gives every evidence of finely developed lungs and did so before she was fairly in the world". As a grandchild of the reigning British monarch in the male line, Marie was formally styled "Her Royal Highness Princess Marie of Edinburgh" from birth.

Marie's baptism took place in the private chapel at Windsor Castle on 15 December; Arthur Stanley and Gerald Wellesley, Dean of Windsor, officiated. The baptism, "of a strictly private nature", took place one day after the ceremony marking the anniversary of the death of her paternal grandfather, Prince Albert. Marie's godparents were Empress Maria Alexandrovna (her maternal grandmother, for whom Queen Victoria stood proxy), the Princess of Wales (her paternal aunt), the Duchess of Saxe-Coburg and Gotha (her great-aunt, for whom Princess Christian of Schleswig-Holstein stood proxy), the Tsarevich of Russia (her maternal uncle, for whom Count Pyotr Andreyevich Shuvalov stood proxy) and the Duke of Connaught and Strathearn (her paternal uncle, for whom the Duke of Albany stood proxy).

=== Upbringing ===
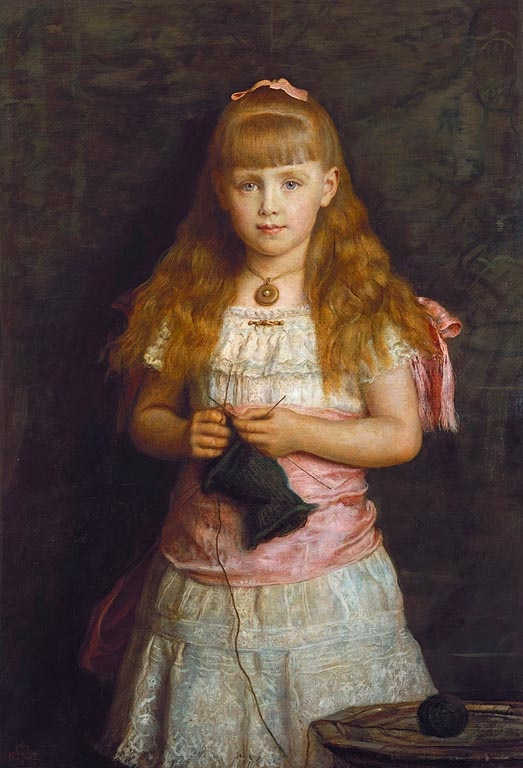
Marie, aged seven, in an 1882 portrait by John Everett Millais commissioned by Queen Victoria and exhibited at the Royal Academy

Marie and her siblings, Prince Alfred (b. 1874, known as "Young Affie"), and Princesses Victoria Melita (b. 1876, known as "Ducky"), Alexandra (b. 1878, known as "Sandra") and Beatrice (b. 1884, known as "Baby Bee"), spent much of their early life at Eastwell Park, which their mother preferred to Clarence House, their official residence. In her memoirs, Marie remembered Eastwell fondly. The Duke of Edinburgh was largely absent from his children's lives due to his position in the British Royal Navy, and their life was governed by their mother. Marie later stated that she did not even know the colour of her father's hair until she looked at later portraits of him, believing it to be much darker than it actually was. When he was at home, the Duke would often play with his children, inventing many games for them. Of all her siblings, Marie was closest to her sister Victoria Melita, who was one year younger, but whom everyone believed to be the older girl because of her stature, much to the princesses' dismay. The Edinburgh children were all baptised and raised in the Anglican faith; this upset their Russian Orthodox mother.

The Duchess of Edinburgh was a supporter of the idea of separating generations, and Marie deeply regretted the fact that her mother never allowed chatting between the two "as if [they] were equals". Nonetheless, the Duchess was independent-minded, cultured, and "the most important person" in her children's lives. At the behest of their mother, Marie and her sisters were taught French, which they detested and rarely spoke. Overall, the Duchess neglected her daughters' education, considering them not very bright or gifted. They were permitted to read aloud, but in the fields of painting and drawing, areas in which they had inherited Queen Victoria's talent, the girls received only a "pedestrian instruction". The Duke and Duchess of Edinburgh frequently received members of the royal family at Eastwell Park, inviting them for breakfast nearly daily, and in 1885 Marie and Victoria Melita served as bridesmaids at the wedding of their aunt Beatrice and Prince Henry of Battenberg. Among Marie's playmates were her maternal cousins Grand Dukes Nicholas (called "Nicky"), George (called "Georgie"), and Grand Duchess Xenia of Russia; their siblings, Michael (called "Misha") and Olga, were too young for the Edinburgh girls. Other playmates included the children of Marie's maternal uncle Grand Duke Vladimir Alexandrovich of Russia.

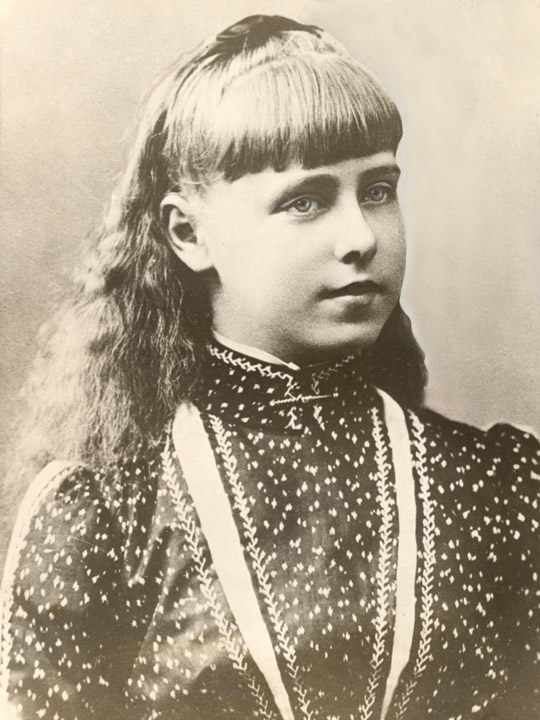
Princess Marie, photographed in 1888

In 1886, when Marie was eleven years old, the Duke of Edinburgh was named commander-in-chief of the Mediterranean Fleet and the family took up residence at San Antonio Palace in Malta. Marie later described her time in Malta as "the happiest memory of my existence". It was in Malta that Marie found her first love, Maurice Bourke, the captain of the Duke's ship, whom Marie called "Captain Dear". She was prone to fits of jealousy when Bourke would pay more attention to one of her sisters than to her. The Duke and Duchess were greatly loved in Malta, and San Antonio Palace was frequently full of guests. Marie and Victoria Melita received white horses from their mother and went to the local hippodrome nearly daily, apart from Saturday. During their first year in Malta, a French governess oversaw the princesses' education, but due to her failing health, she was replaced the following year by a much younger German woman. At San Antonio, the Duke and Duchess of Edinburgh always maintained a room ready for Prince George of Wales, the second son of the Prince of Wales, who was in the Royal Navy. George called the three elder Edinburgh girls "the three dearests", but favoured Marie most of all.

Their sojourn in Malta ended in 1889, when the Duke of Edinburgh became heir presumptive to his childless paternal uncle, Ernest II, Duke of Saxe-Coburg and Gotha, upon the Prince of Wales's renunciation of his rights to the duchy, and the family relocated to Coburg. Marie later came to view this moment as "truly the end of a life that had been absolute happiness and joy without clouds, of a life with no disappointments or delusions and without any discordant note". The Duchess, who was pro-German, hired a German governess for her daughters, bought them plain clothing and even had them confirmed in the Lutheran faith. The family spent their summers at Rosenau Castle. Duke Ernest was described by Marie as "having his oddities"; his court was less strict than other German courts of the time. In Coburg, the princesses' education was broadened: more emphasis was placed on painting and music, which were taught by Anna Messing and Mrs. Helferich respectively. On Thursdays and Sundays, Marie and her sisters went to the Coburg Theatre, an experience which they enjoyed greatly. Marie and Victoria Melita often observed their brother's friends and made comments on whom they liked better, an aspect which Marie believed was inevitable in the lives of girls who have brothers. Another activity which the girls enjoyed at Coburg was attending winter parties organised by their mother, where they would ice-skate and play different games, such as ice hockey.

=== Marriage ===
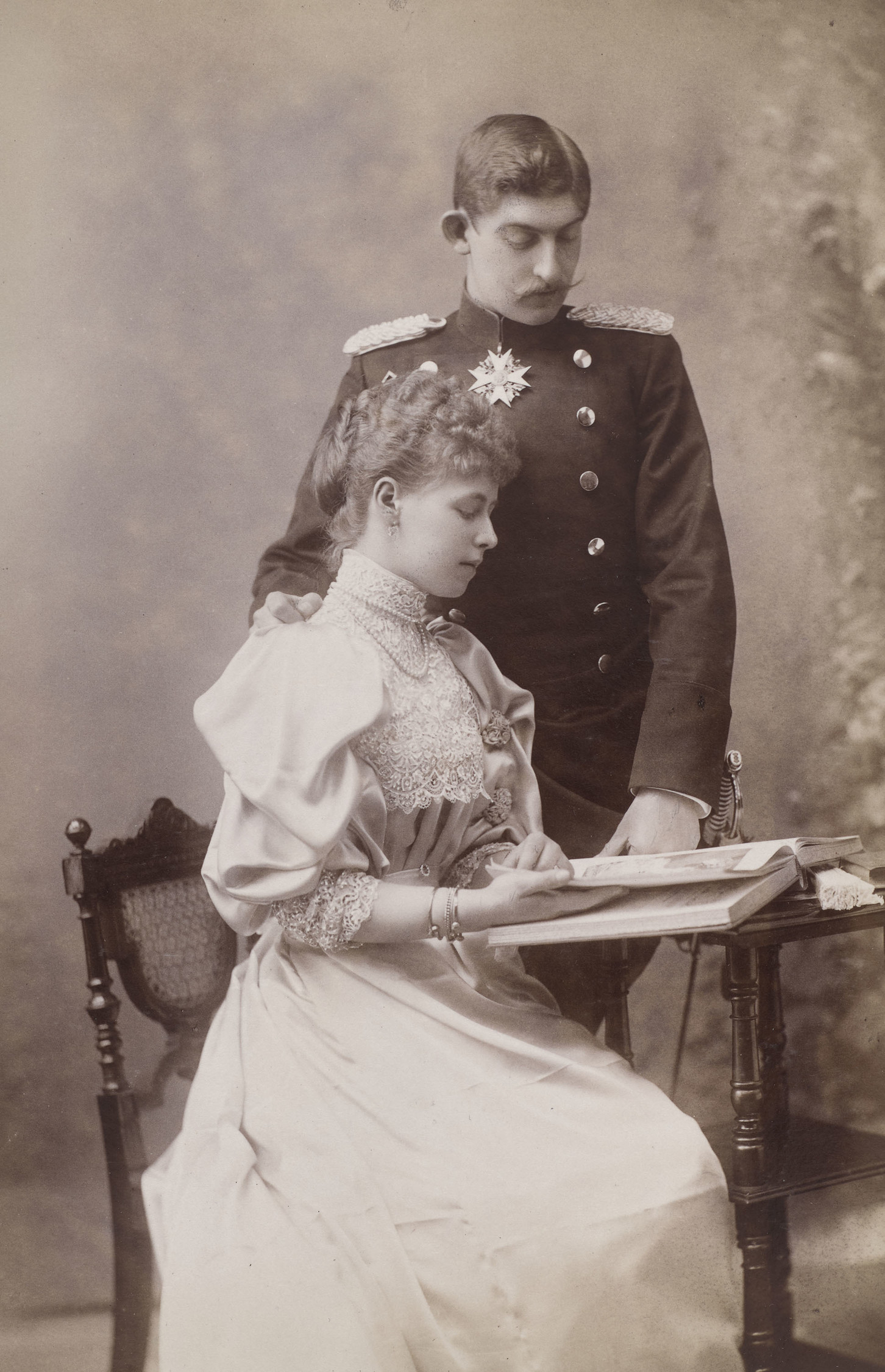
Ferdinand and Marie, the Crown Prince and Princess of Romania, pictured after their 1893 marriage

Marie grew into a "lovely young woman" with "sparkling blue eyes and silky fair hair"; she was courted by several royal bachelors, including Prince George of Wales, who in 1892 became second in line to inherit the throne. Queen Victoria, the Prince of Wales, and Marie's father the Duke of Edinburgh all approved, but the Princess of Wales, and Marie's mother, the Duchess of Edinburgh did not. The Princess of Wales disapproved of the family's pro-German sentiment, while the Duchess of Edinburgh did not wish her daughter to remain in England, which she disliked. In addition, the Princess of Wales (whose father, Christian IX of Denmark, had been a minor German prince before being called to the Danish throne) was higher than Marie in the order of precedence. The Duchess of Edinburgh was also opposed to marriage between first cousins, which was not allowed by her native Russian Orthodox Church. Thus, when George proposed to her, Marie informed him that the marriage was impossible and that he must remain her "beloved chum". Queen Victoria would later comment that "Georgie lost Missy by waiting & waiting".

Around this time, King Carol I of Romania was looking for a suitable bride for his nephew, Crown Prince Ferdinand, in order to secure the succession and ensure the continuation of the House of Hohenzollern-Sigmaringen. Possibly motivated by the prospect of removing tensions between Russia and Romania on the subject of control over Bessarabia, the Duchess of Edinburgh suggested that Marie meet Ferdinand. Marie and Ferdinand first became acquainted during a gala dinner, where they conversed in German. She found him shy but amiable, and their second meeting went just as well. Once they were formally engaged, Queen Victoria wrote to another granddaughter, Princess Victoria of Hesse and by Rhine, that "[Ferdinand] is nice & the Parents are charming–but the country is very insecure & the immorality of the Society at Bucharest quite awful. Of course the marriage will be delayed some time as Missy won't be 17 till the end of October!" German Empress Frederick, Marie's aunt, wrote to her daughter, Crown Princess Sophia of Greece, that "Missy is till now quite delighted, but the poor child is so young, how can she guess what is before her?" In late 1892, King Carol visited London in order to meet the Duke of Edinburgh and Queen Victoria, who eventually agreed to the marriage and appointed him a Knight of the Garter.

On 10 January 1893, Marie and Ferdinand were married at Sigmaringen Castle. During the evening before the wedding, Marie's father Prince Alfred, Duke of Edinburgh reportedly summoned Marie to his rooms to inform her that he and her mother had settled a dowry of 1,000,000 French francs (then worth approximately £40,000) on Marie, before bursting into tears and declaring that he had hoped for a different destiny for his daughter. The couple were married in three ceremonies: one civil, one Catholic (Ferdinand's religion) and one Anglican. The civil ceremony was performed in the Red Hall of the castle by Karl von Wendel, the German Emperor being the first of the witnesses present to sign the marriage act. At four o'clock, the Catholic ceremony took place at the Town Church, with Marie being led to the altar by her father. The Anglican ceremony was more modest and was conducted in one of the chambers of the castle. Although King Carol granted the couple "Honigtag" (one day of honeymoon), Marie and Ferdinand spent a few days at the Castle of Krauchenwies in Bavaria. From there, they left for the countryside, interrupting their journey briefly to stop at Vienna, where they visited Emperor Franz Joseph. Due to growing tensions between Austria and Romania (the visit took place during the ongoing movement of the Transylvanian Memorandum), the couple's visit was brief, and they arrived in the border town of Predeal following a nighttime crossing of Transylvania by train. Marie was warmly welcomed by the Romanian people, who were longing for a more personal monarchy.

=== Issue ===
| Name | Birth | Death | Spouse and children |
|---|---|---|---|
| King Carol II of Romania | 15 October 1893 | 4 April 1953 | Married 1918, Ioana Maria Valentina "Zizi" Lambrino (1898–1953); 1 son (Carol Lambrino); Married 1921, Princess Helen of Greece and Denmark (1896–1982); 1 son (King Michael of Romania); Married 1947, Elena "Magda" Lupescu (died 1977) no issue |
| Queen Elisabeth of Greece | 12 October 1894 | 15 November 1956 | Married 1921, King George II of Greece (1890–1947) no issue |
| Queen Maria of Yugoslavia | 6 January 1900 | 22 June 1961 | Married 1922, King Alexander I of Yugoslavia (1888–1934); 3 sons (including King Peter II of Yugoslavia) |
| Prince Nicholas | 18 August 1903 | 9 June 1978 | Married 1931, Ioana Doletti (1902/9–1963) no issue; Married 1967, Thereza Lisboa Figueira de Mello (1913–1997) no issue |
| Princess Ileana | 5 January 1909 | 21 January 1991 | Married 1931, Archduke Anton of Austria-Tuscany (1901–1987); 2 sons, 4 daughters Married 1953, Dr. Stefan Issarescu (1906–2002) no issue |
| Prince Mircea | 3 January 1913 | 2 November 1916 | None |

== Crown Princess (1893–1914) ==
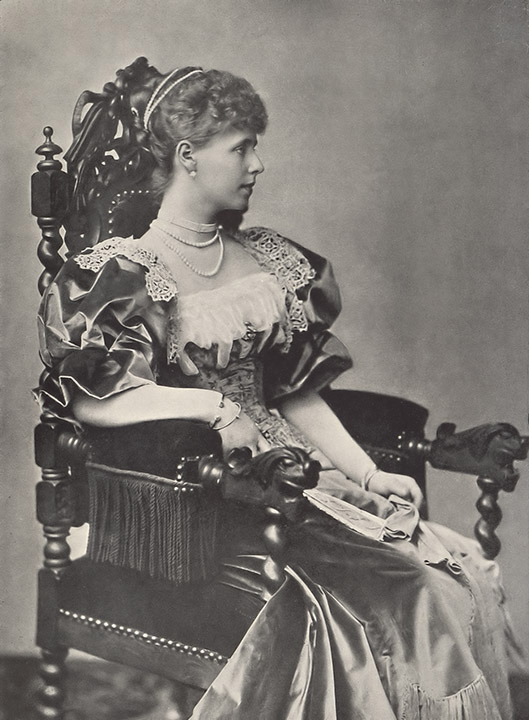
Crown Princess Marie, in the first photograph of her taken in Romania

=== Domestic life ===
The first years of Marie and Ferdinand's marriage were not particularly easy, and Marie would later tell her husband that "it is such a shame that we had to waste so many years of our youth just to learn how to live together!" Gradually, the couple's relationship became based on a cordial friendship: Marie accorded Ferdinand the respect she believed he was due as a man and, later, as king, and he respected her because he realised that she had a better understanding of the world than he did. Eventually, Marie came to believe that she and Ferdinand were "the best associates, the most loyal companions, but our lives intertwine only in certain matters". Ferdinand enjoyed Marie's presence during military marches and she was therefore frequently invited to this sort of event.

Marie gave birth to her first child, Prince Carol on 15 October 1893, only nine months after the wedding. Although Marie requested the use of chloroform in order to ease the pains of labour, doctors were reluctant to administer it, believing "women must pay in agony for the sins of Eve". After Marie's mother and Queen Victoria insisted, King Carol allowed the use of the drug on Marie. Marie did not derive much joy from the arrival of her firstborn, later writing that she "felt like turning [her] head to the wall". Similarly, although Marie was constantly reminded by Carol's wife Elisabeth that childbirth is "the most glorious moment in [Marie's] life", she could only feel a longing for her mother at the birth of her second child, Princess Elisabeth, in 1894. After becoming accustomed to life in Romania, Marie began to rejoice at the births of her children, namely Princess Maria (1900–61), nicknamed "Mignon" in the family, Prince Nicholas (1903–78), nicknamed "Nicky", Princess Ileana (1909–91) and Prince Mircea (1913–16).

King Carol and Queen Elisabeth promptly removed Prince Carol and Princess Elisabeth from Marie's care, considering it inappropriate for them to be raised by their young parents. Marie loved her children, but at times found it difficult even to scold them, thus failing to supervise them properly. The royal children were given some education, but were never sent to school. As the royal household could not provide the equivalent of a classroom education, most of the children's personalities became severely flawed as they grew older. Prime Minister Ion G. Duca later wrote that "it was like [King Carol] wished to leave for Romania heirs completely unprepared for succeeding".

=== Life at court ===
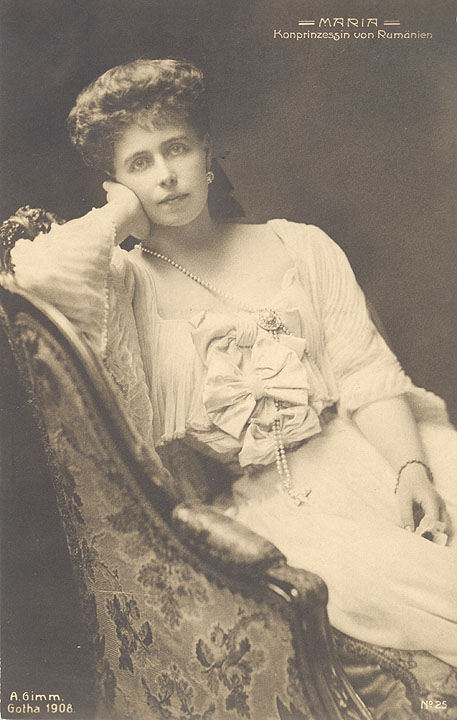
Marie in a portrait by Henry Walter Barnett, c. 1902

From the start, Marie had trouble adjusting to life in Romania. Her personality and "high spirits" frequently created controversies at the Romanian court, and she disliked the austere atmosphere of her household. She wrote that she "had not been brought down to Romania to be adored and spoilt and made much of; she had come to be part of the machinery King Carol had wound up. She had been imported to be trimmed, educated, cut down and trained according to the great man's conception of things." When describing her early days in Romania, Marie wrote that "for long hours [she] would mope, whilst [her] young husband did his military service, all alone in rooms [she] hated, heavy German rooms". Marie's paternal aunt, the Empress Frederick, wrote to her daughter, the Crown Princess of Greece, that "Missy of Roumania is more to be pitied than you. The King is a great tyrant in his family, & has crushed the independence in Ferdinand so that no one cares about him, & his beautiful & gifted little wife, I fear, gets into scrapes, & like a butterfly, instead of hovering over the flowers, burns her pretty wings by going rather near the fire!" Easily learning to speak the Romanian language, Marie followed her mother's advice to dress carefully and show respect for Orthodox rituals.

Marie and Ferdinand were advised by King Carol to maintain a restricted group of friends; thus, Marie would lament that her familial circle had been shrunk to only the King and Ferdinand, "who stood in mighty awe of the iron old man, forever trembling that any action of [hers] might displease that duty-bound head of the family". The Times Literary Supplement wrote that Marie had found herself, "from the hour of her arrival in Bucharest under the tutelage of that stern disciplinarian King Carol I".

In 1896, Ferdinand and Marie moved to Cotroceni Palace, which had been extended by the Romanian architect Grigore Cerchez, and to which Marie added her own designs. The following year, Ferdinand was struck down with typhoid fever. For days, he was delirious and, despite his doctor's best efforts, came close to dying. During this time, Marie exchanged numerous letters with her family in Britain and was terrified at the prospect of losing her husband. King Carol still had an heir in Prince Carol, whose young age presented issues; thus, the whole family desperately wished for Ferdinand to pull through. Eventually, he did, and he and Marie went to Sinaia, the site of Peleș Castle, for a period of recovery. Nonetheless, the couple was not able to attend celebrations for Queen Victoria's Diamond Jubilee that summer. During Ferdinand's convalescence, Marie spent most of her time with her two children, taking them on long walks and picking flowers with them. The winter of 1897/1898 was spent with the Russian Imperial family on the French Riviera, where Marie often rode horses, in spite of the low temperatures.

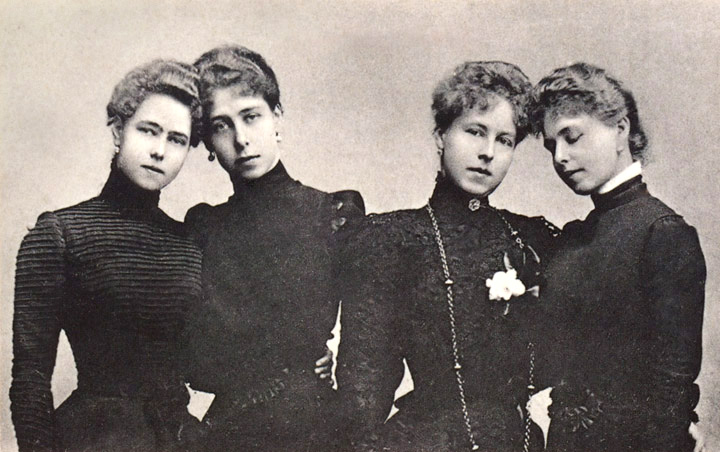
Marie (far right) and her sisters in mourning after the death of their father in 1900

Around this time, Marie met Lieutenant Gheorghe Cantacuzène, a member, albeit through an illegitimate branch, of an ancient Romanian princely family and a descendant of Prince Șerban Cantacuzino. Although not very good looking, Cantacuzène stood out using his sense of humour and fashion, as well as his talent in horse-riding. The two soon became romantically involved, but their affair was terminated after it became known by the public. As much as she condemned Marie's behaviour, her mother allowed her to come to Coburg when, in 1897, she apparently became pregnant. Historian Julia Gelardi believes that Marie gave birth to a child at Coburg; the child may either have been stillborn or sent to an orphanage immediately following its birth. There was speculation on whether Marie's second daughter, "Mignon", was Cantacuzène's daughter, and not Ferdinand's. Over the following years, Marie was also rumoured to have been romantically linked to Grand Duke Boris Vladimirovich of Russia, (Note: Boris was rumoured to have been "Mignon"'s natural father; the princess's paternity was reputedly "a public secret" and Marie frequently taunted King Carol by telling him that Boris was, in fact, "Mignon"'s father.) Waldorf Astor, (Note: Astor was rumoured to have been the father of Prince Nicholas, Marie's second son, whose blue eyes and "hawk nose" resembled those characteristic of the Astors. As he grew older, Nicholas came to resemble his Hohenzollern relatives, thus quelling prior gossip.) Prince Barbu Știrbey (Note: Știrbey was rumoured to have been the father of Princess Ileana and Prince Mircea, Marie's youngest children.) and Joe Boyle. In 1903, Ferdinand and Marie inaugurated the Pelișor Castle, an Art Nouveau castle in Sinaia that King Carol commissioned for the royal couple. Marie only learned of the extent of repression used to quell the 1907 Romanian Peasants' Revolt once it was too late to intercede. She afterwards took to dressing quite often in folk costume, both at home and in public, initiating a fashion trend among young upper-class women.

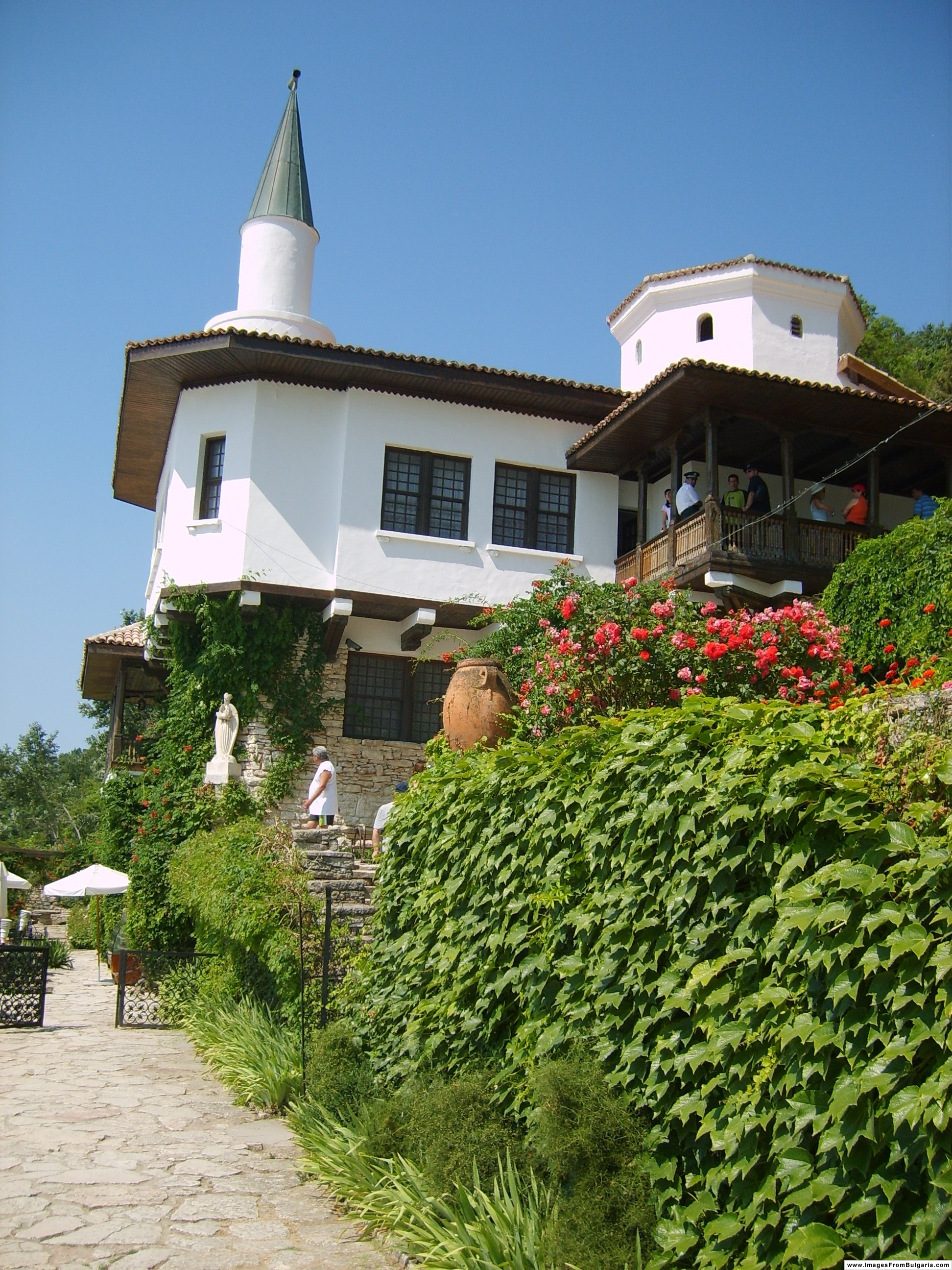
Marie's summer residence in Balchik

On 29 June 1913, the Tsardom of Bulgaria declared war on Greece, thus starting the Second Balkan War. On 4 July, Romania entered the war, allying itself with Greece. The war, which lasted a little over a month, was worsened by a cholera epidemic. Marie would look upon her first encounter with an epidemic as a turning point in her life. With the help of Dr. Ioan Cantacuzino and Sister Pucci, a Red Cross nurse, Marie travelled between Romania and Bulgaria, lending a helping hand in hospitals. These events would prepare her for her experiences in the Great War. As a result of the war, Romania gained possession of Southern Dobrudja, including the coastal town of Balchik (Balcic), which Marie would come to cherish in 1924 and use to host her residence, called The Quiet Nest. Soon after the war ended, Carol became ill.

On 28 June 1914, at Sarajevo, Archduke Franz Ferdinand of Austria was assassinated. This came as a shock to Marie and her family, who were vacationing at Sinaia when the news reached them. On 28 July, Austria-Hungary declared war on Serbia and, as Marie saw it, "the world's peace was torn to shreds". Then, on 3 August, King Carol held a Crown Council at Sinaia, in order to decide whether Romania should enter the war. Although Carol was in favour of his country supporting Germany and the Central Powers, the council decided against it. Not long after the council, Carol's illness worsened and he became bed-ridden; the possibility of his abdication was even discussed. Eventually, he died on 10 October 1914 and Ferdinand automatically succeeded as king.

== Queen of Romania (1914–1927) ==
=== World War I ===
On 11 October 1914, Marie and Ferdinand were acclaimed as king and queen in the Chamber of Deputies. Princess Anne Marie Callimachi, a close friend of Marie's, wrote that "as Crown Princess, [Marie] had been popular; as queen, she was more loved". Marie maintained a certain influence on her husband and the entire court, leading historian A. L. Easterman to write that "it was not [Ferdinand], but Marie who ruled in Romania". At the time of Ferdinand's accession, the government was led by the liberal prime minister Ion I. C. Brătianu. Ferdinand and Marie jointly decided to not make many changes in court and let people accept the transition from one regime to another, rather than force them. Thus, many of Carol and Elisabeth's servants were kept in place, even the ones who were not particularly liked. With Brătianu's help, Marie began pressuring Ferdinand into entering the war; concurrently, she contacted various reigning relatives in Europe and bargained for the best terms for Romania, in case the country should enter the war. Marie favoured an alliance with the Triple Entente (Russia, France and Britain), partly because of her British ancestry. Neutrality was not without perils, and entering the war with the Entente meant that Romania would act as Russia's "buffer" against possible attacks. Meanwhile, in 1915, Marie was elected an honorary member of the Romanian Academy, becoming the second woman to join after Queen Elisabeth.

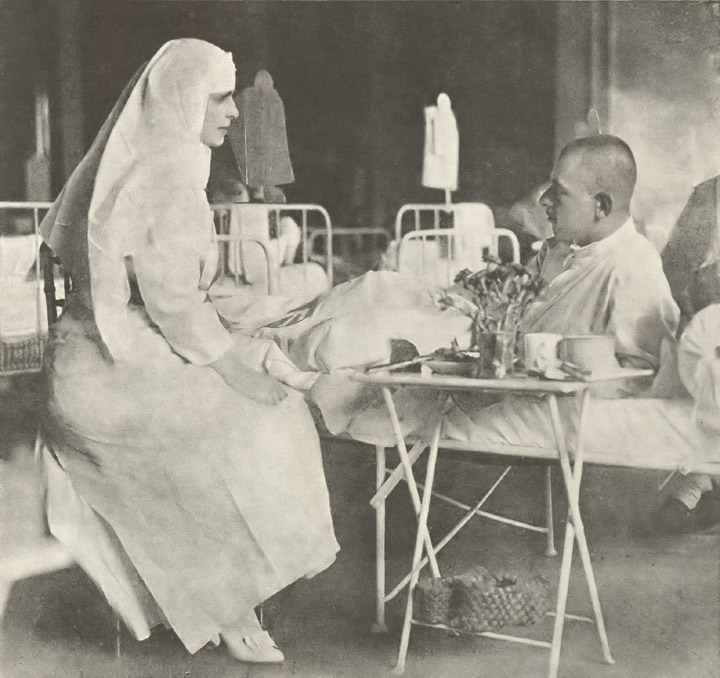
Marie visiting a patient in a military hospital during World War I, 1917

Eventually, Marie demanded of Ferdinand in no uncertain terms that he enter the war, leading the French minister to Romania, Auguste Félix de Beaupoil, Count of Saint-Aulaire, to remark that Marie was twice an ally to the French: once by birth and once by heart. Ferdinand gave in to Marie's pleas, and he signed a treaty with the Entente on 17 August 1916. On 27 August, Romania formally declared war on Austria-Hungary. Saint-Aulaire wrote that Marie "embraced war as another might embrace religion". After informing their children that their country had entered the war, Ferdinand and Marie dismissed their German servants, who could only remain in their employ as "war prisoners" of sorts. Early on during the war, Marie was involved in aiding the Romanian Red Cross and visited hospitals daily. During the first month of hostilities, Romania fought no less than nine battles; some, such as the Battle of Turtucaia, took place on its own soil.

On 2 November 1916, Marie's youngest son, Prince Mircea, who had been sick with typhoid fever, died at Buftea. Marie was distraught and wrote in her journal: "Can anything ever be the same?" After Bucharest fell to Austrian troops, the royal court was transferred to Iași, capital of the Moldavia region, in December 1916. There, she continued to act as a nurse in military hospitals. Daily, Marie would dress as a nurse and go to the train station, where she would receive more injured soldiers; then she would transport them to hospital.

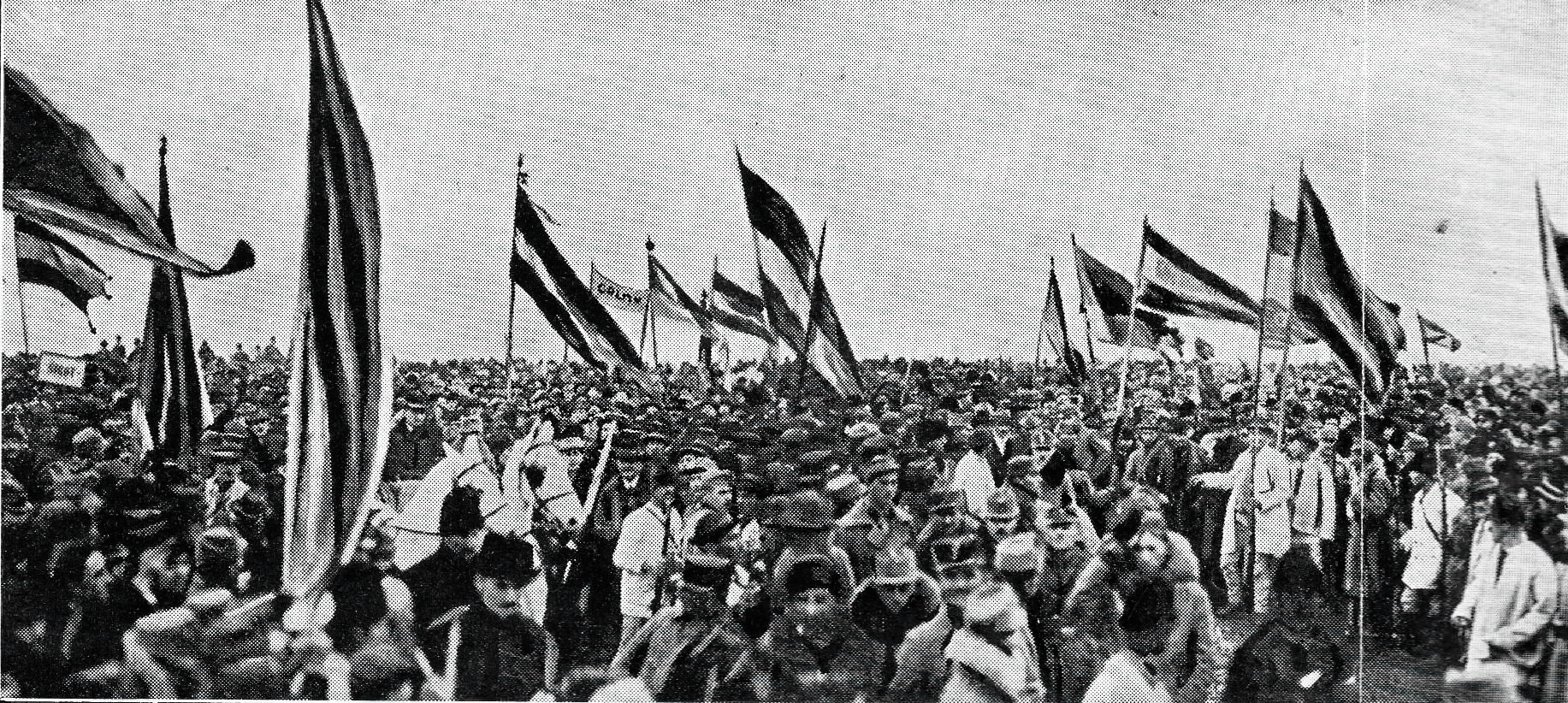
Great National Assembly of Alba Iulia, 1918

After the conclusion of the Russian Revolution in early November 1917 and the victory of the Bolsheviks, Romania became, in the words of diplomat Frank Rattigan, "an island surrounded on all sides by the enemy, with no hope of assistance from the Allies". Soon afterwards, Ferdinand signed the Truce of Focșani, on 9 December 1917. Marie considered the truce perilous, while Brătianu and Știrbey believed it was a necessary measure for obtaining more time. Later turns of events would prove Marie to have assumed correctly. In 1918, Marie vehemently opposed the signing of the Treaty of Bucharest, giving rise to her description as "truly the only man in Romania". The Armistice with Germany (11 November 1918) put an end to fighting in Europe and, thus, to the war.

In the tenth century, the Principality of Hungary had begun conquering Transylvania, which Hungarians had fully occupied by around 1200. The idea of a "Greater Romania" had existed in the minds of Romanians in Transylvania for some time and Brătianu had actively supported the concept before the war. In 1918, both Bessarabia and Bukovina voted for union with Romania. An assembly took place in the ancient city of Alba Iulia on 1 December 1918, where Vasile Goldiș read the resolution for the union of Transylvania with the Old Kingdom. This document, supported by Romanian as well as Saxon deputies, established a High National Romanian Council (Romanian: Marele Sfat Național Român) for the province's temporary administration. Marie wrote, "the dream of România Mare seems to be becoming a reality ... it is all so incredible that I hardly dare believe it." After the assembly, Ferdinand and Marie returned to Bucharest, where they were met by general mirth: "a day of 'wild, delirious enthusiasm', with the bands crashing and the troops marching and the people cheering". Allied troops took part in the celebration and Marie was elated to see the Entente on Romanian soil for the first time. Around this time, Marie became infected with the Spanish flu, with symptoms peaking a week after Alba Iulia; her diary describes "a changed being, miserable and weak, brought to the brink of despair by so much headache and terrible sickness that sapped me of my strength".

=== Paris Peace Conference ===
She is magnificent and we have, against all protocol, shouted our admiration. The day remained grey, but Queen Marie carried her light within her.

— The French writer Colette in Le Matin newspaper, 6 March 1919

Because Ferdinand had refused to sign the Treaty of Bucharest and because Romania had been hostile towards the Central Powers until the end of the war, its place among the winning countries during the Paris Peace Conference was guaranteed. The official delegation was led by Brătianu, who had just begun his third term as prime minister. Brătianu's rigidity, combined with French Prime Minister Georges Clemenceau's reluctance to overlook Ferdinand's acceptance of the Treaty of Bucharest, led to open conflict and the Romanian delegation left Paris, much to the dismay of the "Big Four". Hoping to resolve the situation, Saint-Aulaire suggested that Marie should be sent to the conference instead. The Queen was delighted at the prospect.

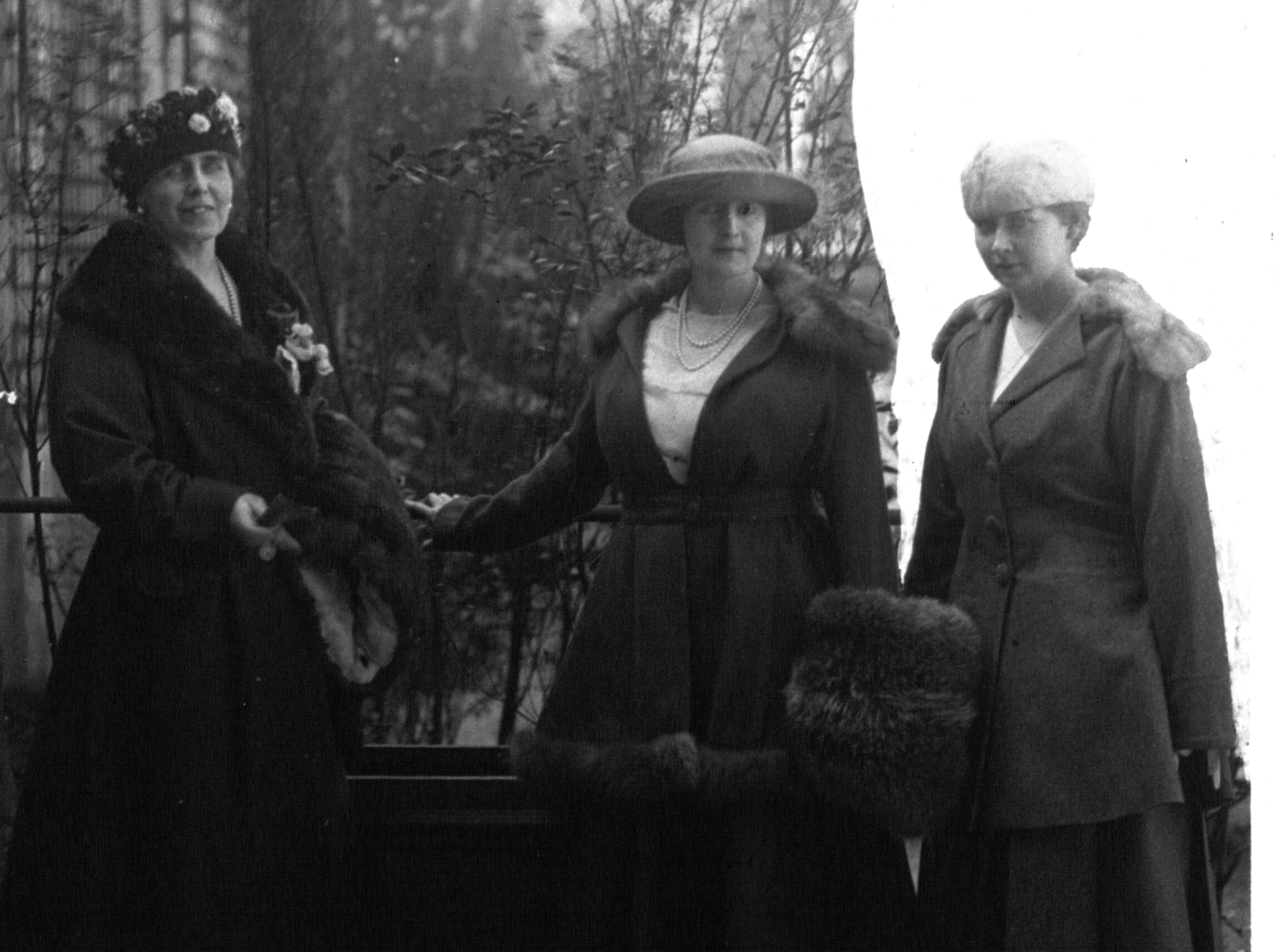
Queen Marie with her two eldest daughters in Paris, 1919

Marie arrived in Paris on 6 March 1919. She was immediately popular with the French people, due to her boldness during the War. Upon meeting Marie, Clemenceau abruptly told her, "I don't like your Prime Minister", to which she replied, "Perhaps then you'll find me more agreeable." He did, and president Raymond Poincaré noticed a change in Clemenceau's attitude towards Romania after Marie's arrival. After staying in Paris for a week, Marie accepted King George V and Queen Mary's invitation and crossed the English Channel, lodging at Buckingham Palace. Hoping to acquire as much goodwill for Romania as possible, Marie became acquainted with many important political figures of the time, including Lord Curzon, Winston Churchill, and Waldorf and Nancy Astor. She also frequently visited her son Nicky, who was then in school at Eton College. Marie was elated to have returned to England after so much time, writing that "it was a tremendous emotion to arrive in London, and to be greeted at the station by George and May."

After the end of her visit in England, Marie returned to Paris, where the people were just as excited for her arrival as they had been a few weeks before. Crowds gathered around her frequently, waiting to see the "exotic" Queen of Romania. American President Woodrow Wilson remained unimpressed by Marie, and her comments on Russian laws dealing with sexual relations, which were considered inappropriate, did not help. Marie shocked many officials by waving all her ministers aside and leading negotiations herself. On this, she later commented, "Never mind, you'll all just have to get used to accepting me with the faults of my virtues." Marie left Paris with numerous supplies for Romania's relief, and later that year the conference resulted in the international recognition of Greater Romania, thus doubling Ferdinand and Marie's kingdom to 295,000 square kilometres (114,000 sq mi) and increasing the population by ten million. This led Grand Duchess Maria Pavlovna of Russia, who briefly lived in Bucharest, to conclude that "by her charm, beauty, and ready wit, [Marie] could obtain anything she desired".

=== Dynastic efforts ===
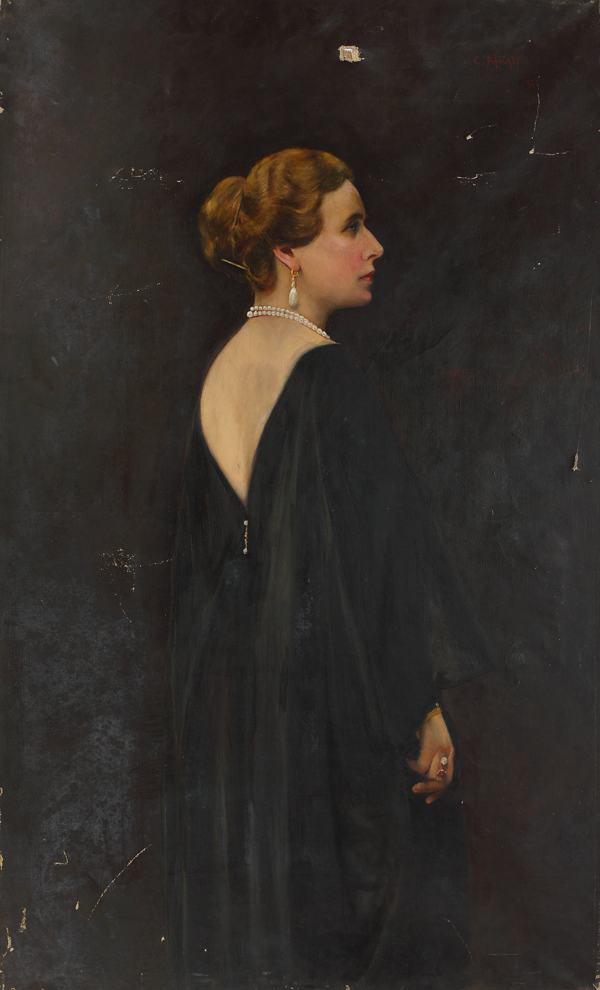
Queen Marie in a portrait by Constantin Pascali, early 1920s

In 1920, Marie's eldest daughter, Princess Elisabeth, was engaged to Prince George of Greece, the eldest son of the deposed King Constantine I of Greece and Marie's cousin Sophia. After inviting George and his two sisters, the Princesses Helen and Irene, to lodge with them at Sinaia, Marie organised numerous activities for the young couple and was delighted at the prospect of marrying off her daughter, whose character was severely flawed. In October, reports of King Alexander's death came from Greece; the Greek princesses had to return to their parents as soon as possible. The following day, news arrived that Marie's mother had died in her sleep in Zürich. Marie made arrangements for her departure to Switzerland, where she would take Helen and Irene to their parents and arrange her mother's funeral. Meanwhile, George and Elisabeth would remain at Sinaia.

Soon enough, Crown Prince Carol proposed to Princess Helen and they were married the following year. Marie was delighted, as she had frowned upon Carol's relationship with Zizi Lambrino and had been worried at the birth of their illegitimate son Carol, who, to her great relief, had been given his mother's surname. In 1922, Marie married her second daughter, "Mignon", to Alexander I of Serbia (later of Yugoslavia). She was delighted at the births of her two royal grandsons, Prince Michael of Romania (1921–2017) and Prince Peter of Yugoslavia (1923–1970); the births of two grandchildren destined to sit on Europe's thrones seemed to cement her ambitions. Marie's dynastic efforts were viewed by critics as those of a manipulative mother who would sacrifice her children's happiness in order to fulfil her ambitions; in reality, Marie never forced any of her children to marry. While attending Peter's baptism, Marie met the Duchess of York, later Queen Elizabeth, by whom she was enchanted.

In 1924, Ferdinand and Marie undertook a diplomatic tour of France, Switzerland, Belgium and the United Kingdom. In England, she was warmly welcomed by George V, who declared that "apart from the common aims, which we pursue, there are other and dear ties between us. Her Majesty the Queen, my dear cousin, is British born." Similarly, Marie wrote that the day of her arrival in England was "a great day for me, one of emotions, sweet, happy and the same time glorious emotions to come back as Queen to my own country, to be received officially, in all honour and enthusiastically into the bargain – to feel your heart swell with pride and satisfaction, to feel your heart beat and tears start into your eyes, while something gave you a lump into your throat!" These state visits were a symbolic recognition of the prestige Romania had gained after World War I. Whilst visiting Geneva, Marie and Ferdinand became the first royals to enter the newly established headquarters of the League of Nations.

=== Coronation ===
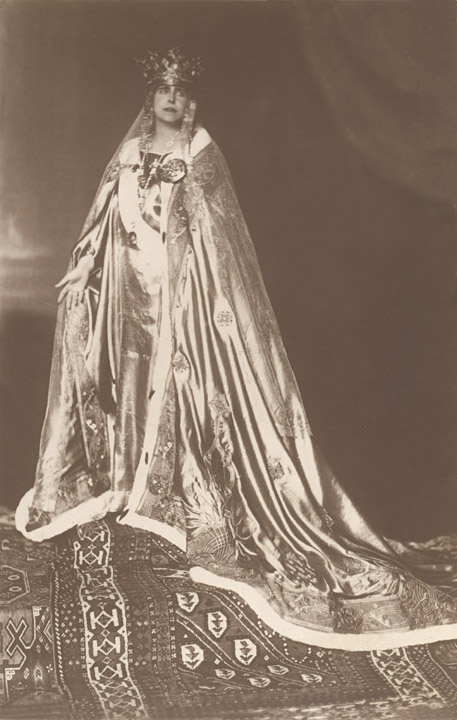
Official coronation portrait of Queen Marie, dressed in full regalia

The location for Marie and Ferdinand's coronation was Alba Iulia, which had been an important fortress in the Middle Ages and where Michael the Brave had been declared Voivode of Transylvania in 1599, thus bringing Wallachia and Transylvania under his personal union. An Orthodox cathedral was built as the Coronation Cathedral in 1921–1922. An elaborate set of jewellery and clothing was made especially for the coronation. Marie's crown was designed by painter Costin Petrescu and it was made in the Art Nouveau style by Falize, a Parisian jewelry house. The crown was inspired by that of Milica Despina, the wife of 16th-century Wallachian ruler Neagoe Basarab, and it was made entirely out of Transylvanian gold. The crown had two pendants on the sides; one contained an image of the royal arms of Romania and the other, the arms of the Duke of Edinburgh, which Marie had used as her own arms prior to her marriage. The crown, which cost around 65,000 francs, was paid for by the state, via a special law.

Among the guests at the royal couple's coronation were Marie's sister "Baby Bee", the Duke of York and French generals Maxime Weygand and Henri Mathias Berthelot, who had led the French military mission to Romania. The ceremony was conducted by the Metropolitan of All Romania, Miron Cristea, but it was not performed inside the cathedral as Ferdinand, a Roman Catholic, refused to be crowned by a member of the Eastern Orthodox Church. After placing his crown on his own head, Ferdinand crowned Marie, who had knelt before him. Immediately, cannons were fired as a sign that the first king and queen of Greater Romania had been anointed. A feast was given in the same room where the union had been proclaimed in 1918; there, more than 20,000 peasants were offered roast steaks. The following day, Ferdinand and Marie triumphantly entered Bucharest. The splendour of the coronation was subsequently cited as evidence of Marie's theatricality. Marie would be received into the Romanian Orthodox Church in 1926, mentioning a desire to be closer to her people.

=== Visit to America ===
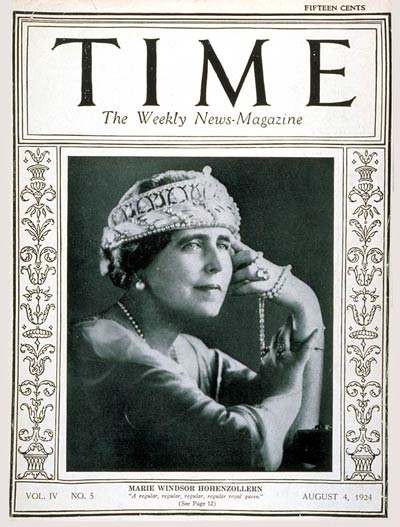
Queen Marie on the cover of Time, 4 August 1924

The Maryhill Museum of Art in Maryhill, Washington, was initially designed as a mansion for wealthy businessman Samuel Hill. However, at the behest of American dancer Loie Fuller, the building was turned into a museum instead. Hill conceived it as a monument to peace, to his wife Mary, and to Queen Marie. The queen agreed to come to America and witness the dedication in 1926, especially as Fuller was an old friend of hers. Fuller quickly put together a committee that supported Marie's "tour" of America and arrangements were made for her departure. Marie viewed the tour as an opportunity to "see the country, meet the people and put Romania on the map". She travelled by ship across the Atlantic Ocean and disembarked in New York, on 18 October 1926, accompanied by Prince Nicholas and Princess Ileana.

Oh, life is a glorious cycle of song,
A medley of extemporanea;
And love is a thing that can never go wrong;
And I am Marie of Roumania.

Dorothy Parker, 1927

Upon her arrival, Marie was welcomed enthusiastically with the "whistle of steamers, roar of guns in white smoke puffs against gray fog, voices cheering in a stinging rain". She was formally greeted by Jimmy Walker, the Mayor of New York City. Constance Lily Morris, author of On Tour with Queen Marie, wrote that the people were excited for Marie's arrival mainly because of her almost mythical allure, which had been created by papers and rumour throughout her life; she observed that "the modest Queen of the Belgians had once come with her king for a brief visit and years ago the dusky Hawaiian ruler had honored us, but there had been no others. The time could not have been better set." Marie was also fairly popular within suffragette circles, where she was viewed as "a woman whose wits had devised many a coup d'état, whose brains had thought out many a difficult problem for her people, who had used the gifts given her to further every good purpose".

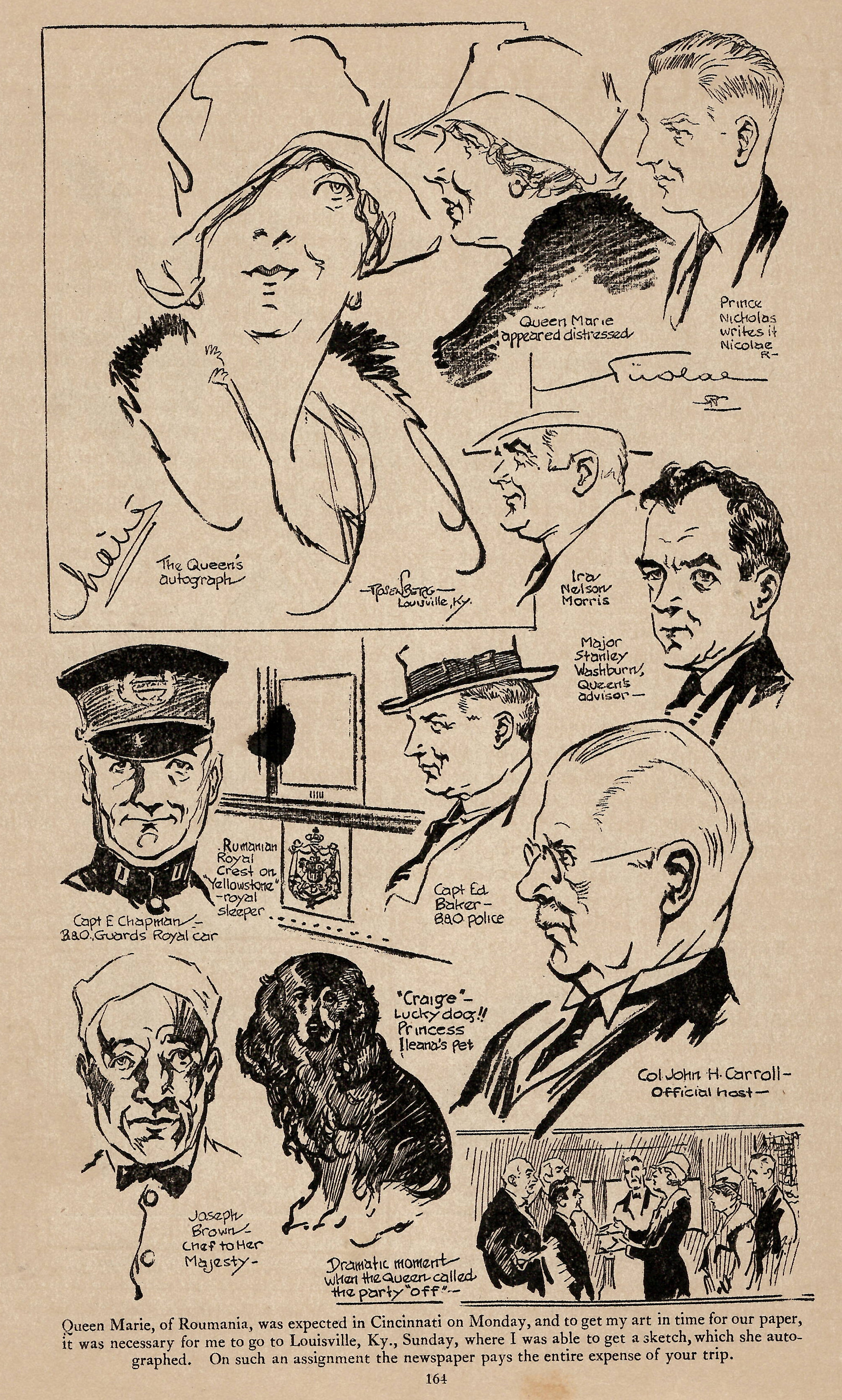
Drawing made by Manuel Rosenberg during Queen Marie's visit to the United States in 1927

During their time in America, Marie, Nicholas and Ileana undertook tours of several cities, including Philadelphia. They were very popular, and were greeted with equal enthusiasm in each city they visited, so much so that "[Nicholas and Ileana] seemed fairly dazed by their tremendous ovation". At the White House, the official dinner was marked by awkward moments, due to the morose attitude of President Calvin Coolidge and his wife Grace; Marie lingered less than two hours. Before leaving the United States, Marie was presented with a bullet-proof armored town car by Willys-Knight, which she joyfully accepted. On 24 November, Marie and her children were seen off by a delegation from Washington, D.C., as they prepared to leave by ship from New York Harbor. Morris wrote that "our last view was of Her Majesty, her children on either side, waving back with that tear-and-smile of those who pass from happy scenes." Morris accompanied the queen throughout her journey and offered a very detailed account of Marie's time in America in her book, published in 1927.

Marie was delighted with the visit, and wished to return to America as soon as possible. She wrote in her diaries:

"both my children and I have but one dream: to return! To return to that stupendous New World, which makes you almost guiddy [sic] because of its immencity, [sic] its noise, its striving, its fearful impetuous [sic] to get on, to do always more, always bigger, quicker, more astonishingly a restless, flaring great world, where I think everything can be realised ... I know, as long as I live, breathe and think, the love for America will beautify my life and thoughts ... Perhaps Fate will allow me one day to go back to America."

== Widowhood (1927–1938) ==
=== 1927–1930 ===
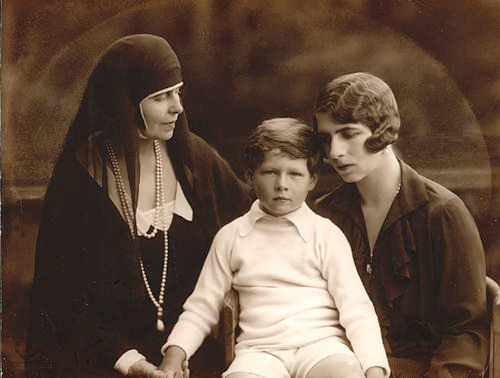
Marie with Helen and Michael, 1927–1930

Prince Carol sparked a dynastic crisis when he officially renounced his rights to succeed Ferdinand on 5 January 1926, simultaneously waiving all parental rights over Prince Michael, who had been proclaimed heir apparent. A Provisional Regency Bill was passed, creating a regency council composed of Prince Nicholas; the Orthodox Patriarch, Miron Cristea; and Gheorghe Buzdugan, the president of the Court of Cassation. However, both Marie and Ferdinand were reluctant to leave the country in the hands of a five-year-old boy, even overseen by a regency, for fear that the lands gained during World War I would be reclaimed by neighbouring countries and that political disturbances might lead to civil unrest. Nevertheless, when Marie returned from America, Ferdinand's death seemed imminent. He was suffering from intestinal cancer, and by April 1927 had come so close to death as to be given the last rites of the Catholic Church. He died on 20 July, in Marie's arms. She later wrote: "'I am so tired' were his last words and when he lay so quiet in my arms one hour later, I knew that I must thank God for him at least. This was rest indeed."

Michael automatically succeeded as king upon Ferdinand's death and the regency council took charge of his role as monarch. In May 1928, Carol, who had found his life abroad with Magda Lupescu unsatisfactory, attempted to return to Romania with the help of the 1st Viscount Rothermere. He was prevented from doing so by English authorities, who then proceeded to expel him from England. Infuriated, Marie sent an official apology to George V on behalf of her son, who had already begun plotting a coup d'état. Carol succeeded in divorcing Princess Helen on 21 June 1928, on grounds of incompatibility.

Marie's popularity was severely affected during Michael's reign and, after refusing to be part of the regency council in 1929, she was accused by the press, and even by Princess Helen, of plotting a coup. During this time, there were numerous rumours as to Princess Ileana's marriage. After talk of Ileana marrying the Tsar of Bulgaria or the Prince of Asturias, she was eventually betrothed to Alexander, Count of Hochberg, a minor German prince, in early 1930. This betrothal was, however, short-lived and Marie never managed to conclude a political marriage for her youngest daughter, instead marrying her to Archduke Anton of Austria–Tuscany in 1931.

=== Carol II's reign ===
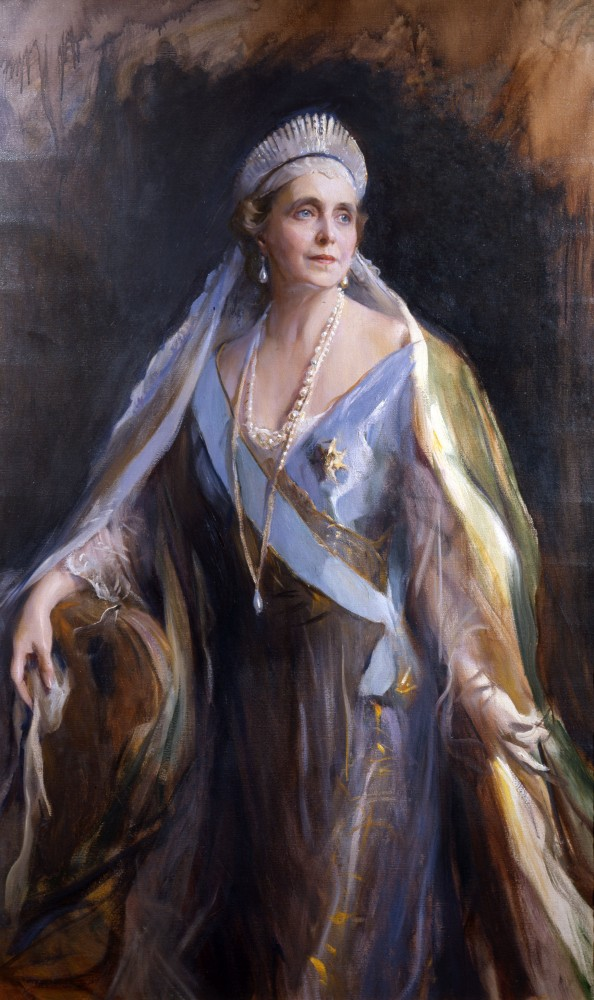
Marie in a Philip de László painting, 1936

On 6 June 1930, Carol arrived in Bucharest and made his way into Parliament, where the Act of Succession 1927 was duly declared null. Thus, Carol usurped the throne from his son, becoming King Carol II. Upon hearing of Carol's return, Marie, who was abroad, was relieved. She had been growing anxious with the direction in which the country was heading and viewed Carol's return as the return of the Prodigal Son. However, as soon as she arrived in Bucharest, she became aware that things would not go well. Carol refused to accept his mother's advice to take Helen back and never sought Marie's counsel during his reign, thus making the already existing breach between mother and son complete.

Desolate and almost stripped of her belief, Marie turned to the religious teachings of the Baháʼí Faith, which she found "vastly appealing". She was particularly attracted by the idea of humanity's unification under one faith, given her own religiously divided family. Introduced to the doctrine by Martha Root, Marie carried on a correspondence with Shoghi Effendi, then head of the Faith, where she expressed herself as a follower of the Baháʼí teachings. Additionally, she made several public statements promoting the teachings of Baháʼu'lláh, describing him as a prophet similar to Jesus or Muhammad. This written correspondence has led Baháʼís to regard her as the first royal convert to their religion. Biographer Hannah Pakula notes that Marie "continued to attend the Protestant Church", even though she "prayed 'better at home with my Baha-u-llah books and teachings.'" In 1976, William McElwee Miller published a polemical book against the religion, which included selections from a letter written in 1970 by Marie's daughter Ileana denying any such conversion had taken place.

In 1931, Prince Nicholas eloped with Ioana Doletti, a divorced woman. Marie strongly disapproved of her son's actions and felt hurt by Doletti's repeated attempts to keep Nicholas from communicating with his mother. Although she blamed the women in her sons' lives for a while, she also came to blame herself, for failing to educate them properly. However, she stubbornly and continually refused to meet Magda Lupescu, even after Carol's pleas. Until her last years, Marie seldom even mentioned Lupescu's name.

With Carol's mistress hated throughout the country, it was only a matter of time before opposition to the King emerged. This opposition most prominently came under the form of the Iron Guard, a group supported by Benito Mussolini and Adolf Hitler. After Carol turned to Ion Duca for help, the Iron Guard assassinated Duca in December 1933. After Duca's death, Carol's popularity plummeted and there were rumours that an attempt would be made on his life at the annual independence parade. In order to avoid this, he instead had Marie attend the parade, in what would be her final public appearance.

After the parade, Carol set out to destroy his mother's popularity among Romanians and tried to push her out of the country. Marie, however, did not comply, instead retreating to either of two locales. The first was Bran Castle. Located near Brașov in southern Transylvania and given to her as a gift in 1920 by grateful local officials, she had it restored over the next seven years. The other was Balchik, where she had built a palace and a small chapel called Stella Maris and tended to her garden. She also visited Ileana and her children in Austria. Ileana rarely received permission from Carol to visit Romania; this irritated Marie greatly. She also spent some time in Belgrade with her daughter "Mignon" and her son-in-law, King Alexander. In 1934, Marie visited England once again.

=== Illness and death ===
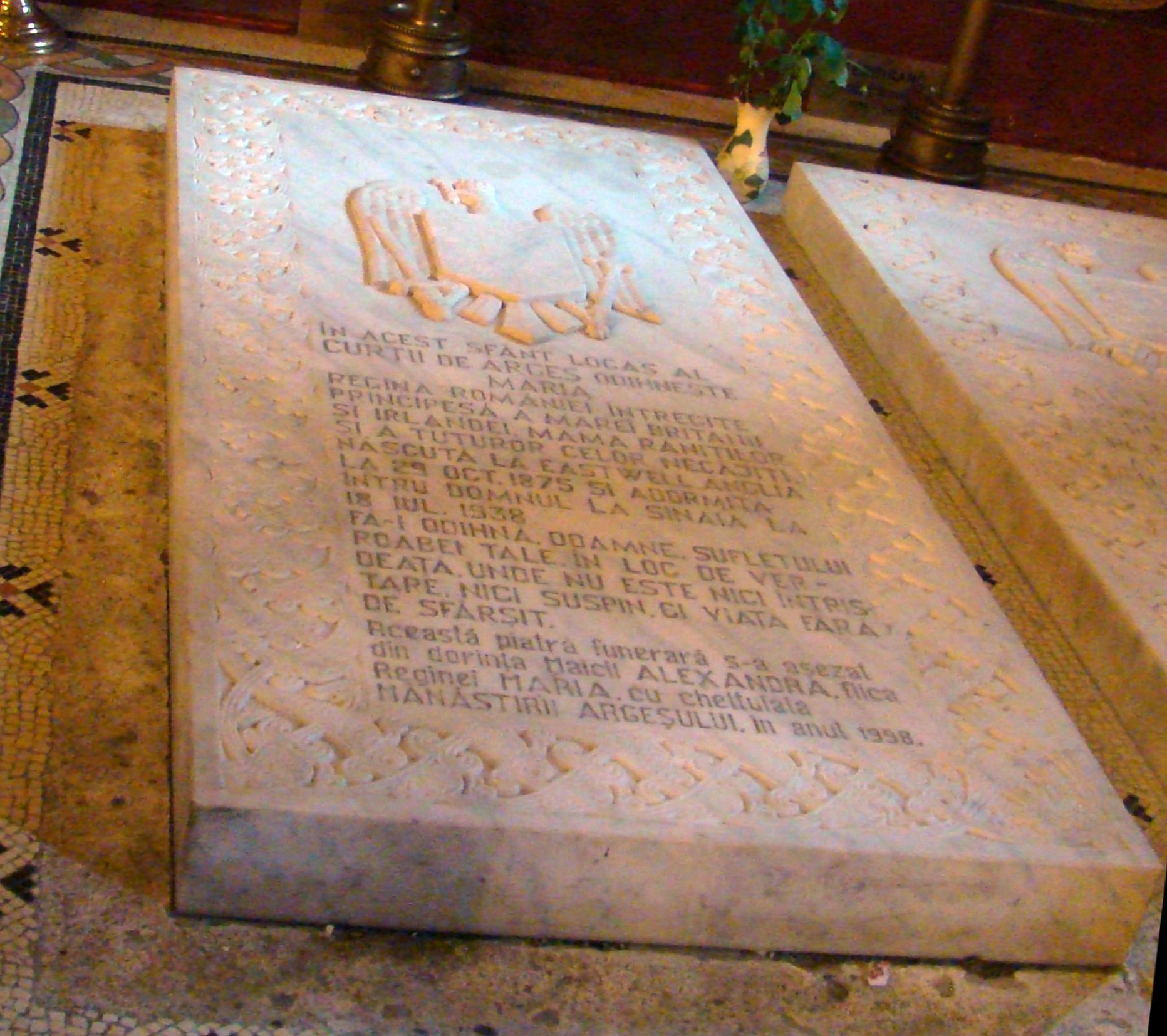
Marie's tomb in Curtea de Argeș Monastery

During the summer of 1937, Marie fell ill. Her personal physician, Dr. Castellani, determined she had pancreatic cancer, although her official diagnosis was cirrhosis of the liver. Marie had not been a drinker and, upon hearing the news, she reportedly said: "then there must be a non-alcoholic cirrhosis of the liver, because I have never in my life tasted alcohol." She was prescribed a diet of cold foods, injections and bed rest. Marie was so weak at times that she could not even pick up a pen. In February 1938, she was sent to a sanatorium in Italy, in hopes that she might recover. There, she was visited by Nicholas and his wife, whom Marie eventually forgave for her transgressions. She was also visited by Princess Helen, whom she had not seen in nearly seven years, and Waldorf Astor. Marie was eventually transferred to a sanatorium in Dresden. Growing weaker and weaker, she requested that she be taken back to Romania, in order to die there. Carol denied her a journey by aeroplane, and she declined a medical flight offered by Hitler, instead choosing to return to Romania by train. She was brought to the Pelișor Castle. (Note: According to official reports, in keeping with Carol's cult of personality, Marie was still alive upon reaching the castle. However, she may in fact have died while on the train, in the Bacău area. At the time, another rumour suggested that Carol had fired a gun at Nicolae, the bullet hitting Marie when she threw herself before the latter.)

Marie died on 18 July 1938, at 5:38 pm, aged 62, eight minutes after lapsing into a coma. Her two eldest children, Carol and Elisabeth, accompanied by Prince Michael, were at her deathbed. Two days later, on 20 July, Marie's body was brought to Bucharest, where she lay in state in the white drawing room at Cotroceni Palace. Her coffin was surrounded by flowers and glowing tapers and was guarded by officers of the Fourth Hussars. Thousands of people filed by Marie's bier during the three-day lying in state and, on the third day, the palace was opened for factory workers. Marie's funeral cortege made its way to the train station, passing under the Arch of Triumph. Her coffin was taken to Curtea de Argeș Monastery, where she was interred. Marie's heart, according to her own wishes, was placed in a small golden casket embellished with the emblems of the Romanian provinces and interred in her Stella Maris chapel in Balchik. In 1940, after Southern Dobrudja was ceded to Bulgaria during World War II, her heart was transferred to Bran Castle. There, Ileana built a chapel to house the heart, kept in two nested boxes placed inside a marble sarcophagus.

Marie was the last queen consort of Romania, as Princess Helen was accorded only the title of Queen Mother between 1940 and 1947. She was one of Queen Victoria's five crowned granddaughters and one of three to retain their positions as consort after the conclusion of World War I, alongside the Queen of Norway and the Queen of Spain.

== Legacy ==
=== Author ===
According to one of her biographers, Diana Mandache, Marie published 34 books and short stories during her lifetime. Encouraged to write by her aunt Queen Elisabeth, she found a source of inspiration in the memoirs of King Carol I. Her first book, The Lily of Life, appeared at Bucharest in 1912. Written in the English she would always use, but soon translated into Romanian, it is a fairy tale with symbolic characters. My Country, published in London in 1916 and in Paris the following year, combined a variety of genres in an effort to raise Allied support for Romania. Nicolae Iorga wrote and published a Romanian translation in 1917, and an expanded version appeared in 1925.

Her critically acclaimed autobiography, The Story of My Life, published by Cassell in London, in three volumes, came out in 1934-1935. The book was reviewed by Virginia Woolf, who felt it was too familiarizing of the royal family. She stated that "suppose that among the autumn books of 2034 is Prometheus Unbound, by George the Sixth, or Wuthering Heights, by Elizabeth the Second, what will be the effect upon their loyal subjects? Will the British Empire survive? Will Buckingham Palace look as solid then as it does now? Words are dangerous things, let us remember. A republic might be brought into being by a poem." At the same time, she appreciated its depiction of a "royal animal" escaping its gilded cage. Critic Octav Șuluțiu emphasized the work's value as a historical document and its psychological insight.

Marie wrote a few diary pages in 1914 upon the death of Carol I, but started keeping a daily diary in August 1916, on the day Romania entered World War I. She wrote new entries almost every day during the war and after, with some pauses in her later years. The first volume was published in 1996. Ten additional books of entries appeared between 2006 and 2014; Marie's war diary, edited by Lucian Boia, was published in 2014; and the entries from her final years were released to the public in 2018.

=== Public figure ===
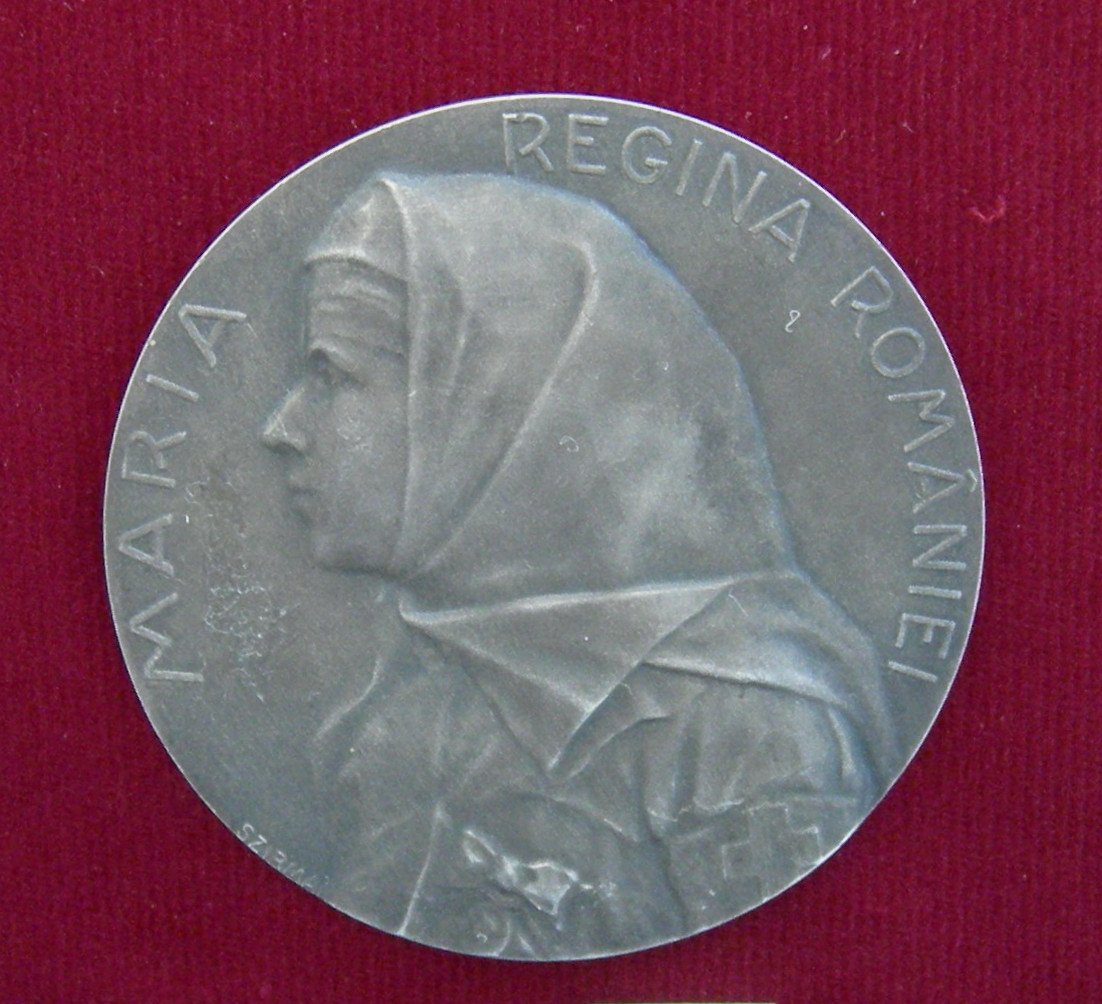
A medal depicting Marie

Even before becoming queen, Marie had succeeded in establishing her public image as that of "one of the best-looking and richest princesses in Europe". She was known primarily for her talent in horse-riding, writing, painting, sculpting and dancing, as well as for her beauty. Her popularity was dimmed by two slanderous campaigns: that conducted by the Central Powers during World War I; and that led by Communist officials after Romania's transition to a Socialist Republic in 1947.

During Romania's 42 years under Communist rule, Marie was alternately depicted as either an "agent of English capitalism" or as a devoted patriot who believed that her destiny was intertwined with that of Romania. In the 1949 Adevărata istorie a unei monarhii ("The True History of a Monarchy"), author Alexandru Gârneață refers to orgies that supposedly were held by Marie at Cotroceni and Balchik and claims that her cirrhosis was caused by her heavy drinking, even offering examples of instances when a drunken Marie needed to be carried off a yacht by her fellow drinkers. Marie's supposed extramarital affairs were brought forward as evidence of promiscuity, which contravened Communist values. In 1968, Communist officials vandalised the chapel sheltering Marie's heart, opening the sarcophagus and taking the boxes as well as the heart into Bran Castle. In 1971, these were transferred to Bucharest's National Museum of Romanian History. It was not until the late period of Nicolae Ceaușescu's regime, the last years before the Romanian Revolution, that Marie's merits came to be acknowledged.

In Romania, Marie is known by the nickname Mama Răniților ("Mother of the Wounded"), or simply as "Regina Maria", while in other countries she is remembered as the "Soldier Queen" and "Mamma Regina". Marie is also nicknamed "the mother-in-law of the Balkans", due to her children's marriages into the region's ruling houses. By the time of her death, Marie's children had ruled in three Balkan countries, although her descendants no longer occupy any European throne. Marie was called "one of the greatest figures in Romanian history" by Constantin Argetoianu, and in her honour, Romania established the Order of the Cross of Queen Marie in 1917.

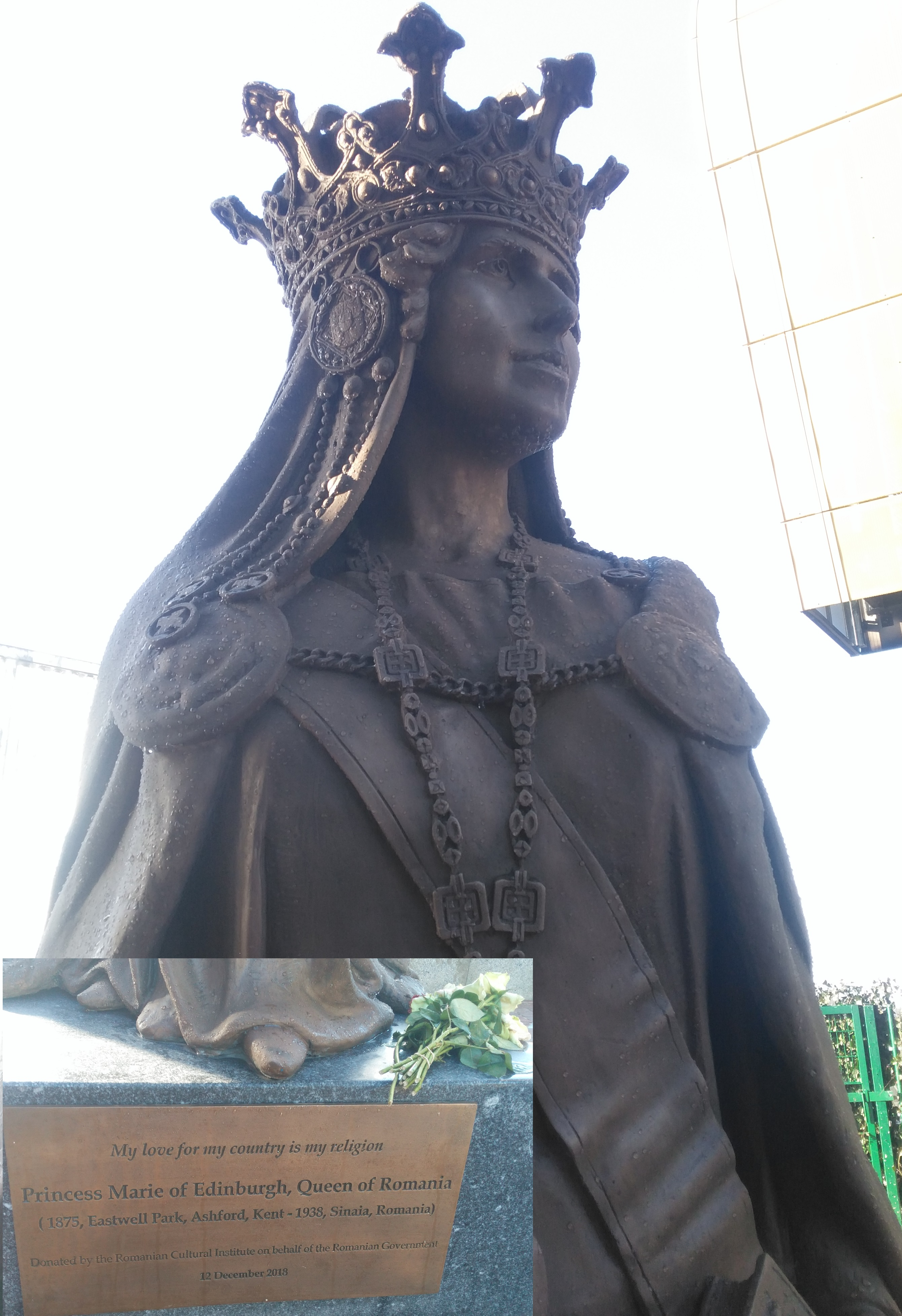
Statue celebrating Queen Marie's birth at Eastwell Park, Ashford, Kent

Oscar Han executed a bronze bust of Marie. Unveiled in the center of Balchik in 1933, it was evacuated to Constanța during the Romanian withdrawal of 1940. It then spent most of the next eight decades in storage, at times being threatened with melting under the Communist regime and receiving a bullet hole in the back of the head. The restored bust was placed in front of the Constanța art museum in 2020. A statue of Queen Marie was unveiled in Ashford, Kent, in December 2018, to mark her birth and childhood at the nearby Eastwell Park. Soon afterwards, a fictionalised account of her role in the Paris Peace Conference was given in a feature film, Queen Marie, while American author Laurie R. King depicted the queen at Bran in the mystery novel Castle Shade.

Other cities with statues of Marie include Oradea (2012), Bucharest (2018, in Izvor Park), Giurgiu (2020), Alba Iulia (2022), Deva (2023) and Chișinău (2025).

=== Personal effects and jewels ===
Prior to 2009, many of Marie's personal belongings were on display at Bran Castle, her residence in her later years, which functions as a museum. That year, when the castle was legally restored to Princess Ileana's heirs, the Culture Ministry moved the collection of her items to a nearby building, Vama Medievală, which is also open to visitors. In 2015, the casket containing the queen's heart was placed on a pedestal in the room at Pelișor where she died; the display can be viewed by the public.

The Maryhill Museum of Art holds a permanent exhibition titled "Marie, Queen of Romania". This display includes the queen's coronation gown, a copy of the crown, silverware, gilt furniture, and jewelry, among other items.

The Queen Marie of Romania Sapphire is named from its association with Marie. Originally set in a necklace by Cartier in 1913, the drop jewel weighs 478 carats. It was transferred to a diamond necklace in 1919 and King Ferdinand purchased it for Marie in 1921. The price was 1,375,000 francs, to be paid in four instalments until 1924. At the time, large jewelry had not excited Marie's interest; she preferred to wear a Greek cross or, when she attended the Paris Opera, her pearls. However, the sapphire sautoir (jewel chain) was an ideal match for the sapphire tiara she had bought from Russian exile Grand Duchess Vladimir. She wore them both at her coronation receptions and when sitting for her portrait by Philip de László. During her visit to the United States, when she presided over a ball at the New York Ritz-Carlton, one observer remarked: "There was a heavy chain of diamonds, broken at intervals with squares of massive design. From this chain was suspended an unbelievable egg-shaped sapphire, one of the largest, it is said, in the world".

== Titles, styles, honours and arms ==
=== Titles and styles ===
- 29 October 1875 – 10 January 1893: Her Royal Highness Princess Marie of Edinburgh
- 10 January 1893 – 10 October 1914: Her Royal Highness The Crown Princess of Romania
- 10 October 1914 – 20 July 1927: Her Majesty The Queen of Romania
- 20 July 1927 – 18 July 1938: Her Majesty Queen Marie of Romania

=== Honours ===
Marie was a recipient of the following national and foreign honours:

- United Kingdom:
  - CI: Companion of the Crown of India, 11 December 1893
  - RRC: Member of the Decoration of the Royal Red Cross
  - VA: Royal Order of Victoria and Albert, 2nd Class
  - DStJ: Lady of Justice of St. John
  - GCVO: Dame Grand Cross of the Royal Victorian Order
- (Saxe-Coburg and Gotha) (Duchy of Saxe-Altenburg) (Saxe-Meiningen) Ernestine duchies: Dame, Special Class of the Decoration of Honour of the Saxe-Ernestine
- Kingdom of Romania:
  - Knight Grand Cross of the Order of the Crown
  - Knight Grand Cross of the Order of Carol I, with Collar, 1906
  - Knight Grand Cross of the Order of Ferdinand I, with Collar, 1930
- (Austrian Empire) (Kingdom of Hungary) Austria-Hungary: Grand Cross of the Order of Elizabeth, 1913
- France:
  - Grand Cross of the Legion of Honour, March 1919
  - Médaille militaire
- Grand Duchy of Hesse: Dame of the Golden Lion, 1 May 1896
- Kingdom of Italy: Grand Cross of the Crown of Italy
- Kingdom of Portugal: Dame of the Order of Queen Saint Isabel
- Russian Empire: Grand Cross of St. Catherine, 1896
- Spain: Dame of the Order of Queen Maria Luisa, 1909
- Kingdom of Yugoslavia: Grand Cross of St. Sava

=== Arms ===
As a male-line grandchild of a British Sovereign, Marie bore the arms of the kingdom, with an inescutcheon for Saxony, differenced by a five-point label argent, the outer pair of which bore anchors azure, the inner roses gules, and the central a cross gules. In 1917, the inescutcheon was dropped by Royal Warrant from George V.

Marie's coat of arms as a British princess

Early monogram of Queen Marie

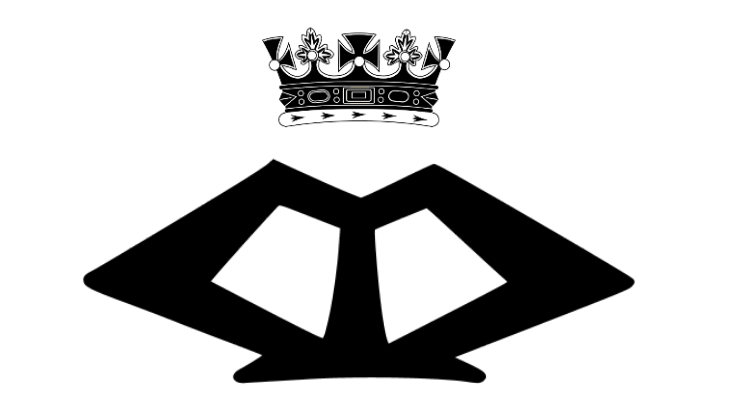
Monogram of Princess Marie of Edinburgh

Monogram of Queen Marie of Romania

Coat of arms of Queen Marie, as Dame of the Order of Queen Maria Luisa (Spain; note Romanian arms on left)

== Ancestry ==
Ancestors of Marie of Romania

8. Ernest I of Saxe-Coburg and Gotha
4. Prince Albert of Saxe-Coburg and Gotha
9. Princess Louise of Saxe-Gotha-Altenburg
2. Alfred, Duke of Saxe-Coburg and Gotha
10. Prince Edward, Duke of Kent and Strathearn
5. Queen Victoria of the United Kingdom
11. Princess Victoria of Saxe-Coburg-Saalfeld
1. Princess Marie of Edinburgh
12. Nicholas I of Russia
6. Alexander II of Russia
13. Princess Charlotte of Prussia
3. Grand Duchess Maria Alexandrovna of Russia
14. Louis II, Grand Duke of Hesse and by Rhine
7. Princess Marie of Hesse and by Rhine
15. Princess Wilhelmine of Baden

== Written works ==
=== Books ===
- The Lily of Life: A Fairy Tale (1912)
- The Dreamer of Dreams (1913)
- Four Seasons Out of a Man's Life (1915)
- The Stealers of Light: A Legend (1916)
- My Country (1916); enlarged as The Country That I Love: An Exile's Memories (1925)
- The Story of Naughty Kildeen (1917/1922)
- Roumania Yesterday and To-day by Winifred Gordon (1918) [introduction and two chapters by Queen Marie]
- Peeping Pansy (1919)
- The Voice on the Mountain: A Story for Those Who Understand (1923)
- Why?: A Story of Great Longing (1923)
- The Lost Princess: A Fairy Tale (1924)
- Ilderim: A Tale of Light and Shade (1925)
- The Queen of Roumania's Fairy Book (1925)
- Crowned Queens: A Tale from Out of the Past (1929)
- The Magic Doll of Roumania: A Wonder Story in Which East and West Do Meet (1929)
- The Story of My Life (3 vols., 1934-1935)
- Masks (1935)
- A Christmas Tale (1957)
- Later Chapters of My Life: The Lost Journal of Queen Marie of Romania (2004)

=== Chapters in books ===
- "Preface" in Eminent Europeans (1922) by Eugene Szekeres Bogger
- "Ode to Roumania" in Roumania (1923), ed. Maria Jonescu

=== Short stories ===
- "Lulaloo: A Fairy Tale Told by a Queen", Good Housekeeping, March 1925

=== Songs ===
- "Byzantine Princess Song" (1933)

=== Nonfiction ===
- "Romantic Rumania", The Saturday Evening Post, 7 December 1918
- "Some Memories of the Russian Court", Living Age, 4 October 1919
- "The Fallen Czar", Woman's Home Companion, July 1920
- "The Vanished Tsarina", Living Age, 4 October 1920
- "A Resurrected Army", Living Age, 16 July 1921
- "Modern Fashions", The Living Age, 7 February 1925
- "A Queen Looks at Life", North American Newspaper Alliance, June 1925 [syndicated series] (Note: According to "A Bookman's Notes: Ghost Writing", The Bookman, October 1927, Zoë Beckley, journalist for the Famous Features Syndicate, ghostwrote Queen Marie's newspaper articles. According to Philip Schuyler, "Who Piqued the Interest of a Queen?", Editor & Publisher, 13 June 1925, Beckley solicited this particular series from the queen in Bucharest on 1 February 1925, but denied ghosting it, restricting herself to typing, and correcting punctuation and spelling.)
- "How It Feels to Be Queen", Literary Digest, 13 June 1925
- "A Queen Talks About Love", Cosmopolitan, September 1925
- "The Intimate Thoughts of a Queen Facing Fifty", Cosmopolitan, October 1925
- "Foreword", Art and Archeology, January 1926
- "At Grand-Mama's Court", McCall's, March 1926
- "Impressions of America", New York World, 19 October 1926
- "My Impressions of America", North American Newspaper Alliance, 21 October – 4 December 1926 [14-part syndicated series]
- "Open Letters of Queen Marie of Rumania", The Bahá'í World, vol. 2 (1926–1928) [originally in Toronto Daily Star, 4 May 1926, and Philadelphia Evening Bulletin, 27 September 1926]
- "The Story of My Life", The Saturday Evening Post, 16 December 1933 – 3 February 1934 [8 parts]
- "My Life as a Crown Princess", The Saturday Evening Post, 14 April – 16 June 1934 [8 parts; not in 12 May 9 June]
- "My Mission: I. In Paris", The Cornhill Magazine, October 1939
- "My Mission: II. At Buckingham Palace", The Cornhill Magazine, November 1939
- "My Mission: III. Paris Again", The Cornhill Magazine, December 1939

=== Letters ===
- A Biographer's Notebook, by Hector Bolitho (1950) [includes Queen Marie's letters to her "American friend"]
- Queen Mary of Romania: Letters to Her King (2015)
- Queen Marie of Romania: Letters to Her Mother (2 vol., 2016)

=== Non-English works ===
Marie's work has been published in Romanian, French, German, Italian and other languages.

=== Archives ===
A large part of Queen Marie's papers (including correspondence and photographs) is preserved in different American institutions, including the "Queen Marie of Romania Papers" collection in the Library of Kent State University (Kent, Ohio), the "George I. Duca Papers" collection in the Hoover Institution Archives (Stanford, California), and the "Lavinia A. Small Papers" collection in the Library of the University of Colorado at Boulder (Boulder, Colorado).

Marie's letters to her parents-in-law, Leopold of Hohenzollern-Sigmaringen and Antonia of Portugal, between 1892 and 1904 are preserved in the Hohenzollern-Sigmaringen family archive, which is in the State Archive of Sigmaringen (Staatsarchiv Sigmaringen) in the town of Sigmaringen, Baden-Württemberg, Germany. Marie's letters to her husband's grandmother, Josephine of Baden, between 1893 and 1899 are also preserved in the State Archive of Sigmaringen (Staatsarchiv Sigmaringen).

Marie of Romania House of Saxe-Coburg and Gotha Cadet branch of the House of Wettin Born: 29 October 1875 Died: 18 July 1938
Romanian royalty
| Preceded by Elisabeth of Wied | Queen consort of Romania; 10 October 1914 – 20 July 1927 | Vacant Title next held by Anne of Bourbon-Parma as titular queen |
Awards and achievements
| Preceded by William Sproule | Cover of Time Magazine; 4 August 1924 | Succeeded by John J. Pershing |
