= 13 Septembrie =

Coordinates: 44°25′14″N 26°04′10″E

13 Septembrie quarter on the map of Bucharest

13th of September (Romanian: 13 Septembrie) is a district in the south of Bucharest, Romania in Sector 5, close to the city center.

== History ==
The name comes from the main street in the area: Calea 13 Septembrie, which is named after the date of the closing battle of the 1848 Wallachian Revolution which was fought on the nearby Dealul Spirii between the Ottoman troops and the Firemen division of Bucharest led by captain Pavel Zăgănescu. The 13th of September is the Firefighter's Day in Romania since then.

On the territory of the district were the former Uranus and Izvor neighborhoods, which disappeared in the 1980s, with the start of construction of the Palace of the Parliament during the Nicolae Ceaușescu era (see Ceaușima).

== Landmarks ==
- Palace of the Parliament
- Panduri Hospital
- Marriott Hotel Bucharest
- Monument of Firefighter Heroes from Bucharest
