= Izvor Park =

Park in Bucharest, Romania

- Parcul Izvor
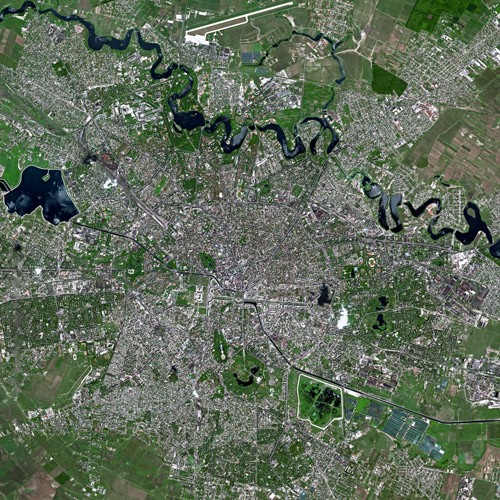
- Location within Bucharest, Romania
- Location: Bucharest, Romania
- Coordinates: 44.4317916°N 26.0852468°E
- Area: 17 hectares (42 acres)
- Administrator: Administrația Lacuri, Parcuri și Agrement București
- Status: Open all year
- Public transit: Izvor metro station

Izvor Park (Romanian: Parcul Izvor) is a public park in central Bucharest (Sector 5). It is located on the right bank of Dâmbovița and in close proximity to the Palace of the Parliament. it is one of the more recent parks in Romania's capital.

== History ==
Before its establishment in the 1990s, the area was occupied by Mihai-Vodă Hill, where the Mihai Vodă Monastery and an important archaeological site dating back to the Bronze Age were situated. The Mihai Vodă Monastery, founded by Michael the Brave, was saved from demolition during the communist regime and relocated nearly 300 meters to the east. However, many other structures, including the State Archives Palace and the ruins of Curtea Nouă, were destroyed to make way for the Civic Center development.

After the hill was leveled and plans for constructing a large conference and reception hall were abandoned, the area remained an unmaintained open space until the early 1990s when it was transformed into Izvor Park.

== Description ==
The park includes four main paths, side alleys, and grassy areas. In 2009, 30 plane trees were planted for the "Bucharest in European Green Space" project. In May 2010, the city established a children’s playground featuring the "Children's Parliament" miniature castle, inclusive attractions, fitness equipment, and ping-pong tables. In 2011, the city and volunteers planted over 320 trees.

== Transportation ==
The park is serviced by Izvor metro station, with access to Line M1 and Line M3.
